= 1826–27 United States House of Representatives elections =

House elections for the 20th U.S. Congress

- July 3, 1826 – August 30, 1827

All 213 seats in the United States House of Representatives 107 seats needed for a majority
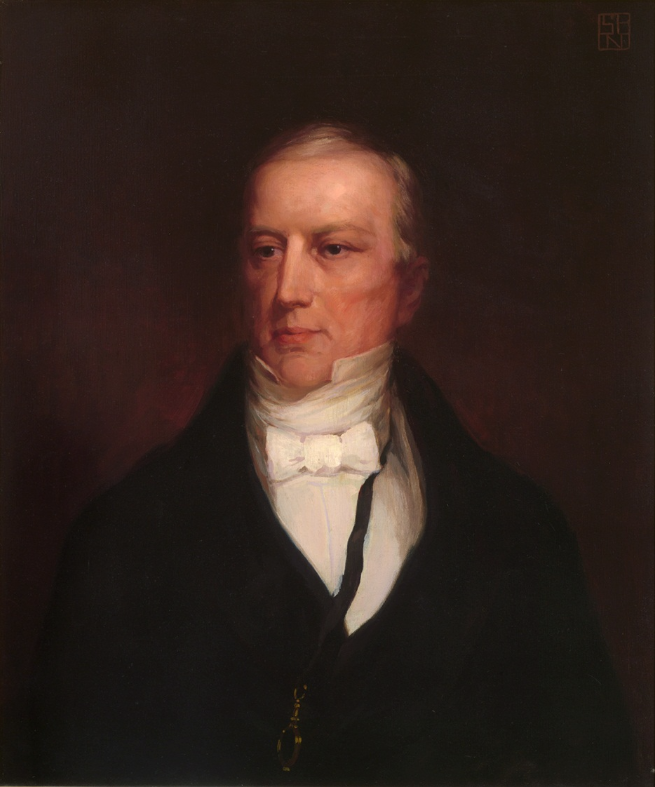

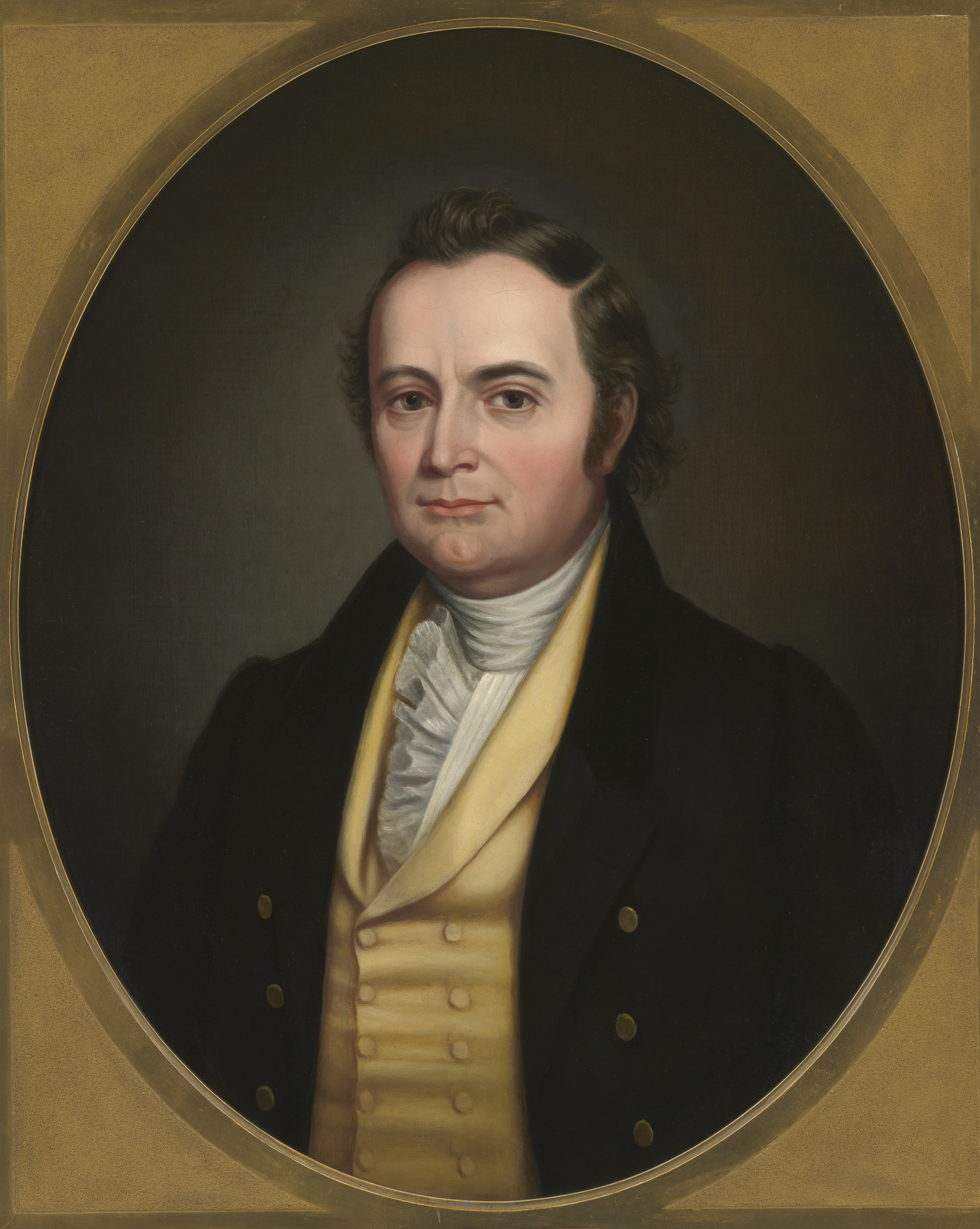
	Majority party	Minority party
Leader	Andrew Stevenson	John W. Taylor
Party	Jacksonian	Anti-Jacksonian
Leader's seat	Virginia 9th	New York 17th
Last election	104 seats	109 seats
Seats won	113	100
Seat change	▲9	▼9
- Results: Jacksonian hold Jacksonian gain Anti-Jacksonian hold Anti-Jacksonian gain Undistricted territory or split plural districts
Speaker before election
John W. Taylor
Anti-Jacksonian
Elected Speaker
Andrew Stevenson
Jacksonian

The 1826–27 United States House of Representatives elections were held on various dates in various states between July 3, 1826, and August 30, 1827. Each state set its own date for its elections to the House of Representatives before the first session of the 20th United States Congress convened on December 3, 1827. They occurred during John Quincy Adams's presidency. Elections were held for all 213 seats, representing 24 states.

In these midterm campaigns, the aftershock of the contested 1824 presidential election remained a major issue. The former Democratic-Republican Party had split into two parties, the "Jacksonians," supporting Andrew Jackson (which would later become the Democratic Party) and the "Adams men" or "Anti-Jacksonians," supporters of President John Quincy Adams. Adams's supporters would later come to be known as the National Republican Party. The Jacksonians were able to pick up a slim majority in the House by painting an image of the Adams Men as elitist and of the Jacksonians as the party of the common farmer or artisan. This tactic helped them pick up a number of rural seats.

== Election summaries ==
↓
100	113
Anti-Jacksonian	Jacksonian

State	Type	Date	Total seats	Anti-Jacksonian		Jacksonian	
State	Type	Date	Total seats	Seats	Change	Seats	Change
Louisiana	Districts	July 3–5, 1826	3	2	Steady	1	Steady
Illinois	At-large	August 7, 1826	1	0	▼1	1	▲1
Indiana	Districts	August 7, 1826	3	2	Steady	1	Steady
Mississippi	At-large	August 7, 1826	1	0	Steady	1	Steady
Missouri	At-large	August 7, 1826	1	1	Steady	0	Steady
Vermont	Districts	September 5, 1826 (Note: Vermont required a majority for election, which was not met on the first vote in 2 districts requiring additional elections held December 4, 1826, and February 5, 1827.)	5	5	▲1	0	▼1
Maine	Districts	September 8, 1826 (Note: Maine required a majority for election, which was not met in the 7th district, requiring additional elections December 18, 1826, April 2, and September 27, 1827.)	7	5	▼1	2	▲1
Georgia	Districts	October 2, 1826	7	0	Steady	7	Steady
Maryland	Districts	October 2, 1826	9	6	▼1	3	▲1
Delaware	At-large	October 3, 1826	1	1	▲1	0	▼1
South Carolina	Districts	October 9–10, 1826	9	0	Steady	9	Steady
New Jersey	At-large	October 10, 1826	6	5	▲2	1	▼2
Ohio	Districts	October 10, 1826	14	12	Steady	2	Steady
Pennsylvania	Districts	October 10, 1826	26	6	▲2	20	▼2
Massachusetts	Districts	November 6, 1826 (Note: Massachusetts required a majority for election, which was not met on the first vote in 3 districts requiring additional elections held March 5 and May 14, 1827.)	13	13	▲1	0	▼1
New York	Districts	November 6–8, 1826	34	14	▼12	20	▲12
Late elections (after the March 4, 1827, beginning of the term)
New Hampshire	At-large	March 13, 1827	6	5	Steady	1	Steady
Connecticut	At-large	April 12, 1827	6	6	Steady	0	Steady
Virginia	Districts	April 30, 1827	22	6	▼1	16	▲1
Alabama	Districts	August 1–3, 1827	3	0	Steady	3	Steady
Tennessee	Districts	August 2–3, 1827	9	0	Steady	9	Steady
Kentucky	Districts	August 6, 1827	12	5	▼2	7	▲2
North Carolina	Districts	August 9, 1827	13	4	▲2	9	▼2
Rhode Island	At-large	August 30, 1827	2	2	Steady	0	Steady
Total			213	100 46.9%	▼9	113 53.1%	▲9

House seats
Jacksonian	53.05%
Anti-Jacksonian	46.95%

== Special elections ==
There were special elections in 1826 and 1827 to the 19th United States Congress and 20th United States Congress.

Special elections are sorted by date then district.

=== 19th Congress ===
District	Incumbent			This race	
District	Member	Party	First elected	Results	Candidates
Virginia 5	John Randolph	Jacksonian	1799; 1813 (lost); 1815; 1817 (lost); 1819	Incumbent resigned December 26, 1825, when appointed U.S. Senator. New member elected January 21, 1826 and seated February 6, 1826. Jacksonian hold. Winner was not a candidate for election to the next term; see below.	▌ ✓ George W. Crump (Jacksonian) 51.9%; ▌William B. Giles (Independent) 48.1%
Maryland 2	Joseph Kent	Anti-Jacksonian	1810; 1814 (lost); 1818	Incumbent resigned January 6, 1826, to become Governor of Maryland. New member elected February 1, 1826 and seated February 7, 1826. Jacksonian gain. Winner was later re-elected to the next term; see below.	▌ ✓ John C. Weems (Jacksonian) 57.9%; ▌William Woottan (Unknown) 42.1%
Pennsylvania 18	Patrick Farrelly	Jacksonian	1820	Incumbent died January 12, 1826. New member elected March 14, 1826 and seated April 3, 1826. Anti-Jacksonian gain. Winner later lost re-election to the next term; see below.	▌ ✓ Thomas H. Sill (Anti-Jacksonian) 39.8%; ▌Stephen Barlow (Jacksonian) 22.9%; ▌Samuel Hays (Unknown) 20.6%; ▌Jacob Herrington (Unknown) 16.7%
Mississippi at-large	Christopher Rankin	Jacksonian	1819	Incumbent died March 14, 1826. New member elected July 10, 1826 and seated December 4, 1826. Jacksonian hold. Winner was later re-elected to the next term; see below.	▌ ✓ William Haile (Jacksonian) 30.5%; ▌John H. Norton (Unknown) 25.5%; ▌Benjamin Grayson (Unknown) 23.2%; ▌Adam L. Bingaman (Unknown) 20.9%
Ohio 10	David Jennings	Anti-Jacksonian	1824	Incumbent resigned May 25, 1826. New member elected October 10, 1826 and seated December 4, 1826. Anti-Jacksonian hold. Winner was not a candidate for the next term; see below.	▌ ✓ Thomas Shannon (Anti-Jacksonian) 37.0%; ▌John Patterson (Anti-Jacksonian) 32.2%; ▌David Robb (Unknown) 17.9%; ▌Zaccheus Beatty (Unknown) 12.9%
Pennsylvania 2	Joseph Hemphill	Jacksonian	1800; 1802 (lost); 1818	Incumbent resigned before October 10, 1826. New member elected October 10, 1826 and seated December 4, 1826. Anti-Jacksonian gain. Winner lost election to the next term; see below.	▌ ✓ Thomas Kittera (Anti-Jacksonian) 55.0%; ▌Henry Horn (Jacksonian) 45.0%
Pennsylvania 7	Henry Wilson	Jacksonian	1822	Incumbent died August 14, 1826. New member elected October 10, 1826 and seated December 4, 1826. Jacksonian hold. Winner was not elected to the next term; see below.	▌ ✓ Jacob Krebs (Jacksonian) 63.4%; ▌George Kerk (Federalist) 36.6%
Pennsylvania 13	Alexander Thomson	Jacksonian	1824	Incumbent resigned May 1, 1826. New member elected October 10, 1826 and seated December 4, 1826. Jacksonian hold. Winner was also elected to the next term; see below.	▌ ✓ Chauncey Forward (Jacksonian) 65.3%; ▌William Piper (Unknown) 34.7%
North Carolina 8	Willie P. Mangum	Jacksonian	1823	Incumbent resigned March 18, 1826. New member elected November 3, 1826 and seated December 4, 1826. Jacksonian hold. Winner was later re-elected to the next term; see below.	▌ ✓ Daniel L. Barringer (Jacksonian) 50.4%; ▌James Mebane (Democratic-Republican) 49.6%
Kentucky 5	James Johnson	Jacksonian	1824	Incumbent died August 13, 1826. New member elected November 6, 1826 and seated December 7, 1826. Jacksonian hold. Winner was later re-elected to the next term; see below.	▌ ✓ Robert L. McHatton (Jacksonian) 34.3%; ▌Alfred Sanford (Anti-Jacksonian) 27.1%; ▌Nicholas D. Coleman (Jacksonian) 22.9%; ▌William Brown (Anti-Jacksonian) 15.7%
Kentucky 12	Robert P. Henry	Jacksonian	1822	Incumbent died August 25, 1826. New member elected November 20, 1826 and seated December 11, 1826. Anti-Jacksonian gain. Winner later lost re-election to the next term; see below.	▌ ✓ John F. Henry (Anti-Jacksonian) 50.7%; ▌Chittenden Lyon (Jacksonian) 49.3%
Maine 5	Enoch Lincoln	Anti-Jacksonian	1818 (special) (Note: In Massachusetts's 20th district)	Incumbent resigned in January 1826. New member elected November 27, 1826 and seated December 4, 1826. Jacksonian gain. Winner had already been elected to the next term; see below.	First ballot (September 11, 1826): ▌James W. Ripley (Jacksonian) 49.8%; ▌Samuel A. Bradley (Unknown) 14.3%; ▌Levi Whitman (Jacksonian) 33.6%; Scattering 2.4%; Second ballot (November 27, 1826): ▌ ✓ James W. Ripley (Jacksonian) 54.1%; ▌Samuel A. Bradley (Unknown) 35.3%; ▌Oliver Herrick (Unknown) 9.7%; Scattering 0.9%

=== 20th Congress ===
District	Incumbent			This race	
District	Member / Delegate	Party	First elected	Results	Candidates
Massachusetts 1	Daniel Webster	Anti-Jacksonian	1812 (Note: In New Hampshire); 1816 (retired); 1822	Incumbent resigned May 30, 1827, to run for U.S. Senator. New member elected July 23, 1827 and seated December 3, 1827. Anti-Jacksonian hold.	▌ ✓ Benjamin Gorham (Anti-Jacksonian) 58.9%; ▌George Blake (Anti-Jacksonian) 24.8%; ▌David Henshaw (Jacksonian) 16.3%
Maine 1	William Burleigh	Anti-Jacksonian	1823	Incumbent died July 2, 1827. New member elected September 27, 1827 and seated December 3, 1827. Jacksonian gain.	▌ ✓ Rufus McIntire (Jacksonian) 52.9%; ▌John Holmes (Anti-Jacksonian) 47.1%
Georgia 1	Edward F. Tattnall	Jacksonian	1820	Incumbent resigned in 1827 before the assembling of Congress. New member elected October 1, 1827 and seated December 3, 1827. Jacksonian hold.	▌ ✓ George R. Gilmer (Jacksonian) 63.5%; ▌Thomas U. Charlton (Unknown) 36.5%
Delaware at-large	Louis McLane	Jacksonian	1816	Incumbent resigned some time in 1827 before the assembling of Congress after being elected to the US Senate. New member elected October 2, 1827 and seated December 3, 1827. Anti-Jacksonian gain.	▌ ✓ Kensey Johns Jr. (Anti-Jacksonian) 52.4%; ▌James A. Bayard Jr. (Jacksonian) 47.4%; Other 0.1%
Ohio 8	William Wilson	Anti-Jacksonian	1822	Incumbent died June 6, 1827. New member elected October 9, 1827 and seated December 3, 1827. Jacksonian gain.	▌ ✓ William Stanbery (Jacksonian); [data missing]
Pennsylvania 2	Vacant			General election ended in a tie vote and the seat remained vacant. New member elected October 9, 1827 and seated January 14, 1828. Anti-Jacksonian gain.	▌ ✓ John Sergeant (Anti-Jacksonian) 51.4%; ▌Joseph Hemphill (Jacksonian) 48.6%
New York 29	David E. Evans	Jacksonian	1826	Incumbent resigned May 2, 1827. New member elected November 5, 1827 and seated December 3, 1827. Anti-Jacksonian gain.	▌ ✓ Phineas L. Tracy (Anti-Jacksonian); [data missing]
Georgia 2	John Forsyth	Jacksonian	1822	Incumbent resigned November 7, 1827, to become Governor of Georgia. New member elected November 17, 1827 and seated January 14, 1828. Jacksonian hold.	▌ ✓ Richard H. Wilde (Jacksonian) 90.8%; Others 9.2%
Kentucky 11	William S. Young	Anti-Jacksonian	1824	Incumbent died September 20, 1827. New member elected November 5–7, 1827 but initial winner declined the seat to avoid an election dispute. New member elected December 22, 1827 and seated January 11, 1828. Jacksonian gain.	▌ ✓ Thomas Chilton (Jacksonian) 50.7%; ▌John Calhoon (Anti-Jacksonian) 49.3%
Arkansas Territory	Henry W. Conway	Unknown	1822	Incumbent died November 9, 1827. New member elected in 1827 or 1828 and seated February 13, 1828. Jacksonian gain.	▌ ✓ Ambrose H. Sevier (Jacksonian); [data missing]

== Alabama ==
Alabama elected its members August 1–3, 1827, after the term began but before the new Congress convened.

District	Incumbent			This race	
District	Member	Party	First elected	Results	Candidates
Alabama 1 "Northern district"	Gabriel Moore	Jacksonian	1821	Incumbent re-elected.	▌ ✓ Gabriel Moore (Note: Source does not give numbers of votes or has incomplete data) (Jacksonian)
Alabama 2 "Middle district"	John McKee	Jacksonian	1823	Incumbent re-elected.	▌ ✓ John McKee (Jacksonian) 67.5%; ▌Thomas Farrar (Unknown) 32.5%
Alabama 3 "Southern district"	George W. Owen	Jacksonian	1823	Incumbent re-elected.	▌ ✓ George W. Owen (Jacksonian)

== Arkansas Territory ==
See Non-voting delegates, below.

== Connecticut ==
Connecticut elected its members April 12, 1827, after the term began but before the new Congress convened.

District	Incumbent			This race	
District	Member	Party	First elected	Results	Candidates
Connecticut at-large 6 seats on a general ticket	Gideon Tomlinson	Anti-Jacksonian	1818	Incumbent lost re-election. (Note: It is unclear whether Tomlinson ran and lost or if the votes for him were unsolicited.); Anti-Jacksonian hold.	▌ ✓ Ralph I. Ingersoll (Anti-Jacksonian) 16.0%; ▌ ✓ Elisha Phelps (Anti-Jacksonian) 13.8%; ▌ ✓ David Plant (Anti-Jacksonian) 10.0%; ▌ ✓ Orange Merwin (Anti-Jacksonian) 9.1%; ▌ ✓ John Baldwin (Anti-Jacksonian) 8.6%; ▌ ✓ Noyes Barber (Anti-Jacksonian) 7.6%; ▌Alexander Stewart (Unknown) 5.5%; ▌Ansel Sterling (Anti-Jacksonian) 5.4%; ▌Andrew T. Judson (Jacksonian) 5.1%; ▌Robert Fairchild (Unknown) 5.0%; ▌Timothy Pitkin (Unknown) 2.7%; ▌Lyman Law (Unknown) 2.6%; ▌Joseph Eaton (Unknown) 2.5%; ▌Jacob B. Gerrly (Unknown) 1.9%; ▌Gideon Tomlinson (Anti-Jacksonian) 1.0%; ▌Roger Sherman (Unknown) 1.0%; ▌Thomas Scott Williams (Unknown) 0.7%
Connecticut at-large 6 seats on a general ticket	Elisha Phelps	Anti-Jacksonian	1818; 1820 (lost); 1825	Incumbent re-elected.	
Connecticut at-large 6 seats on a general ticket	Ralph I. Ingersoll	Anti-Jacksonian	1825	Incumbent re-elected.	
Connecticut at-large 6 seats on a general ticket	Orange Merwin	Anti-Jacksonian	1825	Incumbent re-elected.	
Connecticut at-large 6 seats on a general ticket	Noyes Barber	Anti-Jacksonian	1821	Incumbent re-elected.	
Connecticut at-large 6 seats on a general ticket	John Baldwin	Anti-Jacksonian	1825	Incumbent re-elected.	

== Delaware ==
Delaware elected its member October 3, 1826.

District	Incumbent			This race	
District	Member	Party	First elected	Results	Candidates
Delaware at-large	Louis McLane	Jacksonian	1816	Incumbent re-elected. Incumbent resigned to become U.S. Senator, leading to an October 2, 1827 special election.	▌ ✓ Louis McLane (Jacksonian) 54.1%; ▌Arnold Naudain (Anti-Jacksonian) 45.9%

== Florida Territory ==
See Non-voting delegates, below.

== Georgia ==
Georgia elected its members October 2, 1826. Georgia switched to using districts for this election. Two incumbents, James Meriwether and George Cary, did not run for re-election.

District	Incumbent			This race	
District	Member	Party	First elected	Results	Candidates
Georgia 1	Edward F. Tattnall; Redistricted from the at-large district	Jacksonian	1820	Incumbent re-elected.	▌ ✓ Edward F. Tattnall (Jacksonian) 100%
Georgia 2	John Forsyth; Redistricted from the at-large district	Jacksonian	1822	Incumbent re-elected.	▌ ✓ John Forsyth (Jacksonian) 100%
Georgia 2	George Cary; Redistricted from the at-large district	Jacksonian	1822	Incumbent retired. Jacksonian loss.	▌ ✓ John Forsyth (Jacksonian) 100%
Georgia 3	Wiley Thompson; Redistricted from the at-large district	Jacksonian	1820	Incumbent re-elected.	▌ ✓ Wiley Thompson (Jacksonian) 60.3%; ▌Benjamin Cleveland (Unknown) 39.7%
Georgia 4	James Meriwether; Redistricted from the at-large district	Jacksonian	1824	Incumbent retired. Jacksonian hold.	▌ ✓ Wilson Lumpkin (Jacksonian) 50.3%; ▌Walter T. Colquitt (Unknown) 49.7%
Georgia 5	Charles E. Haynes; Redistricted from the at-large district	Jacksonian	1824	Incumbent re-elected.	▌ ✓ Charles E. Haynes (Jacksonian) 78.7%; ▌August B. Longstreet (Unknown) 21.3%
Georgia 6	Alfred Cuthbert; Redistricted from the at-large district	Jacksonian	1820	Incumbent lost re-election. Jacksonian hold.	▌ ✓ Tomlinson Fort (Jacksonian) 54.0%; ▌Alfred Cuthbert (Jacksonian) 46.0%
Georgia 7	None (new district)			New seat. Jacksonian gain.	▌ ✓ John Floyd (Jacksonian) 51.2%; ▌A. M. King (Note: Source does not give full name.) (Unknown) 48.8%

== Illinois ==
Illinois elected its member August 7, 1826.

District	Incumbent			This race	
District	Member	Party	First elected	Results	Candidates
Illinois at-large	Daniel P. Cook	Anti- Jacksonian	1819	Incumbent lost re-election. Jacksonian gain.	▌ ✓ Joseph Duncan (Jacksonian) 49.5%; ▌Daniel P. Cook (Anti-Jacksonian) 44.0%; ▌James Turney (Unknown) 6.5%; Others 0.1%

== Indiana ==
Indiana elected its members August 7, 1826.

District	Incumbent			This race	
District	Member	Party	First elected	Results	Candidates
Indiana 1	Ratliff Boon	Jacksonian	1824	Incumbent lost re-election. Anti-Jacksonian gain.	▌ ✓ Thomas H. Blake (Anti-Jacksonian) 43.0%; ▌Ratliff Boon (Jacksonian) 42.8%; ▌Lawrence S. Shuler (Unknown) 14.2%
Indiana 2	Jonathan Jennings	Anti-Jacksonian	1822 (special)	Incumbent re-elected.	▌ ✓ Jonathan Jennings (Anti-Jacksonian) 100%
Indiana 3	John Test	Anti-Jacksonian	1822	Incumbent lost re-election. Jacksonian gain.	▌ ✓ Oliver H. Smith (Jacksonian) 55.2%; ▌John Test (Anti-Jacksonian) 44.8%

== Kentucky ==
Kentucky elected its members August 6, 1827, after the term began but before the new Congress convened.

District	Incumbent			This race	
District	Member	Party	First elected	Results	Candidates
Kentucky 1	David Trimble	Anti-Jacksonian	1816	Incumbent lost re-election. Jacksonian gain.	▌ ✓ Henry Daniel (Jacksonian) 52.2%; ▌David Trimble (Anti-Jacksonian) 47.8%
Kentucky 2	Thomas Metcalfe	Anti-Jacksonian	1818	Incumbent re-elected.	▌ ✓ Thomas Metcalfe (Anti-Jacksonian) 54.9%; ▌James Conn (Unknown) 45.1%
Kentucky 3	James Clark	Anti-Jacksonian	1812; 1816 (Resigned); 1825 (special)	Incumbent re-elected.	▌ ✓ James Clark (Anti-Jacksonian) 57.9%; ▌Benjamin Taylor (Jacksonian) 42.1%
Kentucky 4	Robert P. Letcher	Anti-Jacksonian	1822	Incumbent re-elected.	▌ ✓ Robert P. Letcher (Anti-Jacksonian) 53.3%; ▌William Rodes (Jacksonian) 46.7%
Kentucky 5	Robert L. McHatton	Jacksonian	1826 (special)	Incumbent re-elected.	▌ ✓ Robert L. McHatton (Jacksonian) 52.5%; ▌Alfred Sanford (Unknown) 47.5%
Kentucky 6	Joseph Lecompte	Jacksonian	1824	Incumbent re-elected.	▌ ✓ Joseph Lecompte (Jacksonian) 50.8%; ▌Thomas Crittenden (Anti-Jacksonian) 45.6%; ▌C. H. Allen (Jacksonian) 3.6%
Kentucky 7	Thomas P. Moore	Jacksonian	1822	Incumbent re-elected.	▌ ✓ Thomas P. Moore (Jacksonian) 90.5%; ▌Thompson (Unknown) 9.5%
Kentucky 8	Richard A. Buckner	Anti-Jacksonian	1822	Incumbent re-elected.	▌ ✓ Richard A. Buckner (Anti-Jacksonian) 52.1%; ▌William Owens (Jacksonian) 47.9%
Kentucky 9	Charles A. Wickliffe	Jacksonian	1822	Incumbent re-elected.	▌ ✓ Charles A. Wickliffe (Jacksonian) 66.1%; ▌Lee White (Unknown) 33.9%
Kentucky 10	Francis Johnson	Anti-Jacksonian	1820 (special)	Incumbent lost re-election. Jacksonian gain.	▌ ✓ Joel Yancey (Jacksonian) 50.8%; ▌Francis Johnson (Anti-Jacksonian) 49.2%
Kentucky 11	William S. Young	Anti-Jacksonian	1824	Incumbent re-elected.	▌ ✓ William S. Young (Anti-Jacksonian) 56.0%; ▌John Calhoon (Anti-Jacksonian) 44.0%
Kentucky 12	John F. Henry	Anti-Jacksonian	1826 (special)	Incumbent lost re-election. Jacksonian gain.	▌ ✓ Chittenden Lyon (Jacksonian) 52.3%; ▌John F. Henry (Anti-Jacksonian) 31.1%; ▌Anthony New (Anti-Jacksonian) 16.6%

== Louisiana ==
Louisiana elected its members July 3–5, 1826.

District	Incumbent			This race	
District	Member	Party	First elected	Results	Candidates
Louisiana 1	Edward Livingston	Jacksonian	1822	Incumbent re-elected.	▌ ✓ Edward Livingston (Jacksonian) 70.3%; ▌M. Foucher (Unknown) 29.7%
Louisiana 2	Henry H. Gurley	Anti-Jacksonian	1822	Incumbent re-elected.	▌ ✓ Henry H. Gurley (Anti-Jacksonian) 52.5%; ▌W. S. Hamilton (Unknown) 46.1%; ▌David Bradford (Unknown) 1.4%
Louisiana 3	William L. Brent	Anti-Jacksonian	1822	Incumbent re-elected.	▌ ✓ William L. Brent (Anti-Jacksonian); ▌John Brownson (Unknown); ▌Garrigues Fleaujac (Unknown)

== Maine ==
Maine elected its members September 8, 1826. It required a majority for election, which was not met in the 7th district, requiring additional elections December 18, 1826, April 2, and September 27, 1827.

District	Incumbent			This race	
District	Member	Party	First elected	Results	Candidates
Maine 1	William Burleigh	Anti-Jacksonian	1823	Incumbent re-elected. Incumbent died July 2, 1827, before the new Congress convened, leading to a special election.	▌ ✓ William Burleigh (Anti-Jacksonian) 60.5%; ▌Rufus McIntire (Jacksonian) 38.1%; Others 1.4%
Maine 2	John Anderson	Jacksonian	1824	Incumbent re-elected.	▌ ✓ John Anderson (Jacksonian) 57.9%; ▌Stephen Longfellow (Anti-Jacksonian) 41.4%; Others 0.7%
Maine 3	Ebenezer Herrick	Anti-Jacksonian	1821	Incumbent retired. Anti-Jacksonian hold.	▌ ✓ Joseph F. Wingate (Anti-Jacksonian) 55.2%; ▌Daniel Rose (Unknown) 30.1%; ▌Edwin Smith (Unknown) 10.4%; Others 4.3%
Maine 4	Peleg Sprague	Anti-Jacksonian	1825	Incumbent re-elected.	▌ ✓ Peleg Sprague (Anti-Jacksonian) 99.0%; Others 1.0%
Maine 5	Enoch Lincoln	Anti-Jacksonian	1818 (special) (Note: In Massachusetts's 20th district)	Incumbent resigned in January 1826. Jacksonian gain. Successor later elected to finish the current term.	▌ ✓ James W. Ripley (Jacksonian) 52.6%; ▌Levi Whitman (Jacksonian) 30.6%; ▌Samuel Bradbury (Unknown) 15.8%; Others 1.0%
Maine 6	Jeremiah O'Brien	Anti-Jacksonian	1823	Incumbent re-elected.	▌ ✓ Jeremiah O'Brien (Anti-Jacksonian) 54.4%; ▌Joseph Williamson (Jacksonian) 20.0%; ▌Ralph C. Johnson (Unknown) 15.5%; ▌Samuel Whitney (Unknown) 8.1%; Others 1.9%
Maine 7	David Kidder	Anti-Jacksonian	1823	Incumbent retired. New member elected on the fourth ballot. Anti-Jacksonian hold.	First ballot (September 8, 1826): ▌William D. Williamson (Unknown) 42.8%; ▌Jacob McGaw (Unknown) 34.8%; ▌Simon Harriman (Unknown) 6.3%; ▌Jonathan Farrar (Unknown) 5.1%; ▌David Perham (Unknown) 3.5%; Others 7.5%; Second ballot (December 18, 1826): ▌John Wilkins (Unknown) 46.6%; ▌Jacob McGaw (Unknown) 35.4%; ▌Simeon Stetson (Unknown) 11.4%; ▌Jedediah Herrick (Unknown) 1.8%; ▌Simon Call (Unknown) 1.7%; ▌George Leonard (Unknown) 1.6%; ▌Daniel Wilkins (Unknown) 1.6%; Third ballot (April 2, 1827): ▌William D. Williamson (Unknown) 36.5%; ▌Jedediah Herrick (Unknown) 22.7%; ▌Joseph Carr (Unknown) 15.9%; ▌John Wilkins (Unknown) 8.1%; ▌Daniel Wilkins (Unknown) 3.7%; ▌David Kidder (Anti-Jacksonian) 2.8%; ▌Obed Wilson (Unknown) 2.7%; ▌Simon Harriman (Unknown) 1.5%; ▌Isaac Hodson (Unknown) 1.5%; ▌Jacob McGaw (Unknown) 1.2%; Others 3.5%; Fourth ballot (September 27, 1827): ▌ ✓ Samuel Butman (Anti-Jacksonian) 53.3%; ▌Isaac Hudson (Unknown) 39.5%; ▌Asa Wyman (Unknown) 2.7%; Others 4.5%

== Maryland ==
Maryland elected its members October 2, 1826.

District	Incumbent			This race	
District	Member	Party	First elected	Results	Candidates
Maryland 1	Clement Dorsey	Anti-Jacksonian	1824	Incumbent re-elected.	▌ ✓ Clement Dorsey (Anti-Jacksonian) 91.2%; Others 8.8%
Maryland 2	John C. Weems	Jacksonian	1826 (special)	Incumbent re-elected.	▌ ✓ John C. Weems (Jacksonian) 51.1%; ▌Regin Estep (Anti-Jacksonian) 48.9%
Maryland 3	George Peter	Jacksonian	1816 (special); 1824	Incumbent lost re-election. Anti-Jacksonian gain.	▌ ✓ George C. Washington (Anti-Jacksonian) 53.6%; ▌George Peter (Jacksonian) 46.4%
Maryland 4	Thomas C. Worthington	Anti-Jacksonian	1824	Incumbent retired. Jacksonian gain.	▌ ✓ Michael C. Sprigg (Jacksonian) 43.4%; ▌John Lee (Jacksonian) 37.7%; ▌Thomas Kennedy (Unknown) 9.5%; ▌Samuel Hughes (Unknown) 9.4%
Maryland 5 Plural district with 2 seats	John Barney	Anti-Jacksonian	1824	Incumbent re-elected.	▌ ✓ Peter Little (Anti-Jacksonian) 39.1%; ▌ ✓ John Barney (Anti-Jacksonian) 38.6%; ▌John P. Kennedy (Jacksonian) 22.3%
Maryland 5 Plural district with 2 seats	Peter Little	Anti-Jacksonian	1810; 1812 (lost); 1816	Incumbent re-elected.	▌ ✓ Peter Little (Anti-Jacksonian) 39.1%; ▌ ✓ John Barney (Anti-Jacksonian) 38.6%; ▌John P. Kennedy (Jacksonian) 22.3%
Maryland 6	George E. Mitchell	Jacksonian	1822	Incumbent retired. Jacksonian hold.	▌ ✓ Levin Gale (Jacksonian) 25.3%; ▌Israel DeMaulsby (Independent) 24.0%; ▌James W. Williams (Independent) 21.2%; ▌William C. Miller (Independent) 18.2%; ▌Philip Reed (Independent) 11.3%
Maryland 7	John Leeds Kerr	Anti-Jacksonian	1824	Incumbent re-elected.	▌ ✓ John Leeds Kerr (Anti-Jacksonian) 53.0%; ▌Philemon B. Hopper (Unknown) 47.0%
Maryland 8	Robert N. Martin	Anti-Jacksonian	1824	Incumbent retired. Anti-Jacksonian hold.	▌ ✓ Ephraim K. Wilson (Anti-Jacksonian) 97.7%; Others 2.3%

== Massachusetts ==
Massachusetts elected its members November 6, 1826. It required a majority for election, which was not met on the first vote in 3 districts requiring additional elections held March 5 and May 14, 1827.

District numbers vary between sources.

District	Incumbent			This race	
District	Member	Party	First elected	Results	Candidates
Massachusetts 1 "Suffolk district"	Daniel Webster	Anti-Jacksonian	1812 (Note: In New Hampshire); 1816 (retired); 1822	Incumbent re-elected. Incumbent resigned May 30, 1827, after being elected U.S. Senator, leading to a special election.	▌ ✓ Daniel Webster (Anti-Jacksonian) 100%
Massachusetts 2 "Essex South district"	Benjamin W. Crowninshield	Anti-Jacksonian	1823	Incumbent re-elected.	▌ ✓ Benjamin W. Crowninshield (Anti-Jacksonian) 58.9%; ▌Stephen White (Unknown) 9.8%; Others 31.2%
Massachusetts 3 "Essex North district"	John Varnum	Anti-Jacksonian	1825	Incumbent re-elected.	▌ ✓ John Varnum (Anti-Jacksonian) 63.2%; ▌Caleb Cushing (Anti-Jacksonian) 32.7%; ▌John Merrill (Unknown) 4.1%
Massachusetts 4 "Middlesex district"	Edward Everett	Anti-Jacksonian	1824	Incumbent re-elected.	▌ ✓ Edward Everett (Anti-Jacksonian) 100%
Massachusetts 5 "Worcester South district"	John Davis	Anti-Jacksonian	1825	Incumbent re-elected.	▌ ✓ John Davis (Anti-Jacksonian) 92.3%; ▌Jonas Sibley (Unknown) (A?) 7.7%
Massachusetts 6 "Worcester North district"	John Locke	Anti-Jacksonian	1823	Incumbent re-elected.	▌ ✓ John Locke (Anti-Jacksonian) 56.6%; ▌Joseph G. Kendall (Anti-Jacksonian) 34.4%; ▌Luther Lawrence (Unknown) 9.0%
Massachusetts 7 "Franklin district"	Samuel C. Allen	Anti-Jacksonian	1816	Incumbent re-elected.	▌ ✓ Samuel C. Allen (Anti-Jacksonian) 59.8%; ▌George Grennell Jr. (Anti-Jacksonian) 40.2%
Massachusetts 8 "Hampden district"	Samuel Lathrop	Anti-Jacksonian	1819	Incumbent lost re-election. Anti-Jacksonian hold.	First ballot (November 6, 1826): ▌Isaac C. Bates (Anti-Jacksonian) 42.1%; ▌Samuel Lathrop (Anti-Jacksonian) 40.4%; ▌James Fowler (Unknown) 6.5%; ▌Thomas Shepherd (Unknown) 5.5%; Others 5.5%; Second ballot (March 5, 1827): ▌Isaac C. Bates (Anti-Jacksonian) 49.2%; ▌Samuel Lathrop (Anti-Jacksonian) 35.1%; ▌James Fowler (Unknown) 12.6%; Others 3.1%; Third ballot (May 14, 1827): ▌ ✓ Isaac C. Bates (Anti-Jacksonian) 57.1%; ▌Samuel Lathrop (Anti-Jacksonian) 34.8%; ▌James Fowler (Unknown) 8.1%
Massachusetts 9 "Berkshire district"	Henry W. Dwight	Anti-Jacksonian	1820	Incumbent re-elected.	First ballot (November 6, 1826): ▌Jonathan Allen (Unknown) 34.5%; ▌Henry Hubbard (Jacksonian) 23.4%; ▌Robert F. Barnard (Unknown) 12.1%; ▌George Hull (Anti-Jacksonian) 11.8%; ▌Henry W. Dwight (Anti-Jacksonian) 6.6%; Others 11.6%; Second ballot (March 5, 1827): ▌ ✓ Henry W. Dwight (Anti-Jacksonian) 61.2%; ▌Nathan Willis (Unknown) 25.5%; ▌Jonathan Allen (Unknown) 13.2%
Massachusetts 10 "Norfolk district"	John Bailey	Anti-Jacksonian	1823 (special)	Incumbent re-elected.	▌ ✓ John Bailey (Anti-Jacksonian) 60.0%; ▌William Ellis (Unknown) 23.2%; Others 16.8%
Massachusetts 11 "Plymouth district"	Aaron Hobart	Anti-Jacksonian	1820	Incumbent retired. Anti-Jacksonian hold.	▌ ✓ Joseph Richardson (Anti-Jacksonian) 63.9%; ▌Thomas P. Beall (Unknown) 36.1%
Massachusetts 12 "Bristol district"	Francis Baylies	Jacksonian	1820	Incumbent lost re-election. Anti-Jacksonian gain.	First ballot (November 6, 1826): ▌James L. Hodges (Anti-Jacksonian) 34.4%; ▌James Arnold (Unknown) 30.4%; ▌Hercules Cushman (Unknown) 26.8%; ▌Rufus Bacon (Unknown) 8.5%; Second ballot (March 5, 1827): ▌James L. Hodges (Anti-Jacksonian) 40.8%; ▌Hercules Cushman (Unknown) 30.5%; ▌James Arnold (Unknown) 24.6%; ▌Francis Baylies (Jacksonian) 4.2%; Third ballot (May 14, 1827): ▌ ✓ James L. Hodges (Anti-Jacksonian) 57.5%; ▌Hercules Cushman (Unknown) 26.6%; ▌Francis Baylies (Jacksonian) 15.9%
Massachusetts 13 "Barnstable district"	John Reed Jr.	Anti-Jacksonian	1812; 1816 (lost); 1820	Incumbent re-elected.	▌ ✓ John Reed Jr. (Anti-Jacksonian) 83.2%; ▌Walter Folger (Unknown) 16.8%

== Michigan Territory ==
See Non-voting delegates, below.

== Mississippi ==
Mississippi elected its member August 7, 1826.

District	Incumbent			This race	
District	Member	Party	First elected	Results	Candidates
Mississippi at-large	William Haile	Jacksonian	1826 (special)	Incumbent re-elected.	▌ ✓ William Haile (Jacksonian) 33.9%; ▌Beverly R. Grayson (Independent) 24.1%; ▌John H. Norton (Independent) 17.7%; ▌Adam L. Bingaman (Anti-Jacksonian) 15.2%; ▌Richard Stockton (Independent) 9.1%

== Missouri ==
Missouri elected its member August 7, 1826.

District	Incumbent			This race	
District	Member	Party	First elected	Results	Candidates
Missouri at-large	John Scott	Anti-Jacksonian	1820	Incumbent lost re-election. Anti-Jacksonian hold.	▌ ✓ Edward Bates (Anti-Jacksonian) 61.5%; ▌John Scott (Anti-Jacksonian) 38.5%

== New Hampshire ==
New Hampshire elected its members March 13, 1827, after the term began but before the new Congress convened.

District	Incumbent			This race	
District	Member	Party	First elected	Results	Candidates
New Hampshire at-large 6 seats on a general ticket	Ichabod Bartlett	Anti-Jacksonian	1822	Incumbent re-elected.	▌ ✓ Ichabod Bartlett (Anti-Jacksonian) 17.3%; ▌ ✓ Titus Brown (Anti-Jacksonian) 17.1%; ▌ ✓ Joseph Healy (Anti-Jacksonian) 16.4%; ▌ ✓ Jonathan Harvey (Jacksonian) 16.0%; ▌ ✓ David Barker Jr. (Anti-Jacksonian) 11.0%; ▌ ✓ Thomas Whipple Jr. (Anti-Jacksonian) 9.3%; ▌Nehemiah Eastman (Anti-Jacksonian) 5.3%; ▌Samuel Cortland (Unknown) 5.2%; ▌Samuel Webster (Unknown) 1.2%; ▌Ezekiel Webster (Unknown) 1.2%
New Hampshire at-large 6 seats on a general ticket	Jonathan Harvey	Jacksonian	1824	Incumbent re-elected.	▌ ✓ Ichabod Bartlett (Anti-Jacksonian) 17.3%; ▌ ✓ Titus Brown (Anti-Jacksonian) 17.1%; ▌ ✓ Joseph Healy (Anti-Jacksonian) 16.4%; ▌ ✓ Jonathan Harvey (Jacksonian) 16.0%; ▌ ✓ David Barker Jr. (Anti-Jacksonian) 11.0%; ▌ ✓ Thomas Whipple Jr. (Anti-Jacksonian) 9.3%; ▌Nehemiah Eastman (Anti-Jacksonian) 5.3%; ▌Samuel Cortland (Unknown) 5.2%; ▌Samuel Webster (Unknown) 1.2%; ▌Ezekiel Webster (Unknown) 1.2%
New Hampshire at-large 6 seats on a general ticket	Titus Brown	Anti-Jacksonian	1824	Incumbent re-elected.	▌ ✓ Ichabod Bartlett (Anti-Jacksonian) 17.3%; ▌ ✓ Titus Brown (Anti-Jacksonian) 17.1%; ▌ ✓ Joseph Healy (Anti-Jacksonian) 16.4%; ▌ ✓ Jonathan Harvey (Jacksonian) 16.0%; ▌ ✓ David Barker Jr. (Anti-Jacksonian) 11.0%; ▌ ✓ Thomas Whipple Jr. (Anti-Jacksonian) 9.3%; ▌Nehemiah Eastman (Anti-Jacksonian) 5.3%; ▌Samuel Cortland (Unknown) 5.2%; ▌Samuel Webster (Unknown) 1.2%; ▌Ezekiel Webster (Unknown) 1.2%
New Hampshire at-large 6 seats on a general ticket	Nehemiah Eastman	Anti-Jacksonian	1824	Incumbent lost re-election. Anti-Jacksonian hold.	▌ ✓ Ichabod Bartlett (Anti-Jacksonian) 17.3%; ▌ ✓ Titus Brown (Anti-Jacksonian) 17.1%; ▌ ✓ Joseph Healy (Anti-Jacksonian) 16.4%; ▌ ✓ Jonathan Harvey (Jacksonian) 16.0%; ▌ ✓ David Barker Jr. (Anti-Jacksonian) 11.0%; ▌ ✓ Thomas Whipple Jr. (Anti-Jacksonian) 9.3%; ▌Nehemiah Eastman (Anti-Jacksonian) 5.3%; ▌Samuel Cortland (Unknown) 5.2%; ▌Samuel Webster (Unknown) 1.2%; ▌Ezekiel Webster (Unknown) 1.2%
New Hampshire at-large 6 seats on a general ticket	Thomas Whipple Jr.	Anti-Jacksonian	1820	Incumbent re-elected.	▌ ✓ Ichabod Bartlett (Anti-Jacksonian) 17.3%; ▌ ✓ Titus Brown (Anti-Jacksonian) 17.1%; ▌ ✓ Joseph Healy (Anti-Jacksonian) 16.4%; ▌ ✓ Jonathan Harvey (Jacksonian) 16.0%; ▌ ✓ David Barker Jr. (Anti-Jacksonian) 11.0%; ▌ ✓ Thomas Whipple Jr. (Anti-Jacksonian) 9.3%; ▌Nehemiah Eastman (Anti-Jacksonian) 5.3%; ▌Samuel Cortland (Unknown) 5.2%; ▌Samuel Webster (Unknown) 1.2%; ▌Ezekiel Webster (Unknown) 1.2%
New Hampshire at-large 6 seats on a general ticket	Joseph Healy	Anti-Jacksonian	1824	Incumbent re-elected.	▌ ✓ Ichabod Bartlett (Anti-Jacksonian) 17.3%; ▌ ✓ Titus Brown (Anti-Jacksonian) 17.1%; ▌ ✓ Joseph Healy (Anti-Jacksonian) 16.4%; ▌ ✓ Jonathan Harvey (Jacksonian) 16.0%; ▌ ✓ David Barker Jr. (Anti-Jacksonian) 11.0%; ▌ ✓ Thomas Whipple Jr. (Anti-Jacksonian) 9.3%; ▌Nehemiah Eastman (Anti-Jacksonian) 5.3%; ▌Samuel Cortland (Unknown) 5.2%; ▌Samuel Webster (Unknown) 1.2%; ▌Ezekiel Webster (Unknown) 1.2%

== New Jersey ==
New Jersey elected its members October 10, 1826.

District	Incumbent			This race	
District	Member	Party	First elected	Results	Candidates
New Jersey at-large 6 seats on a general ticket	Lewis Condict	Anti-Jacksonian	1820	Incumbent re-elected.	▌ ✓ George Holcombe (Jacksonian) 16.5%; ▌ ✓ Lewis Condict (Anti-Jacksonian) 10.5%; ▌ ✓ Samuel Swan (Anti-Jacksonian) 9.9%; ▌ ✓ Isaac Pierson (Anti-Jacksonian) 9.9%; ▌ ✓ Hedge Thompson (Anti-Jacksonian) 9.8%; ▌ ✓ Ebenezer Tucker (Anti-Jacksonian) 9.7%; ▌Daniel Garrison (Jacksonian) 6.9%; ▌George Cassedy (Jacksonian) 6.7%; ▌Isaac G. Farlee (Jacksonian) 6.4%; ▌William Kennedy (Jacksonian) 6.3%; ▌James Parker (Jacksonian) 0.4%; ▌Ephraim Bateman (Anti-Jacksonian) 0.2%; ▌Peter D. Vroom (Unknown) 0.1%; ▌Caleb Newbold (Unknown) 0.1%
New Jersey at-large 6 seats on a general ticket	George Holcombe	Jacksonian	1820	Incumbent re-elected.	
New Jersey at-large 6 seats on a general ticket	George Cassedy	Jacksonian	1820	Incumbent lost re-election. Anti-Jacksonian gain.	
New Jersey at-large 6 seats on a general ticket	Daniel Garrison	Jacksonian	1822	Incumbent lost re-election. Anti-Jacksonian gain.	
New Jersey at-large 6 seats on a general ticket	Samuel Swan	Anti-Jacksonian	1820	Incumbent re-elected.	
New Jersey at-large 6 seats on a general ticket	Ebenezer Tucker	Anti-Jacksonian	1824	Incumbent re-elected.	

== New York ==
New York elected its members November 6–8, 1826.

District	Incumbent			This race	
District	Member	Party	First elected	Results	Candidates
New York 1	Silas Wood	Anti-Jacksonian	1818	Incumbent re-elected.	▌ ✓ Silas Wood (Anti-Jacksonian) 97.9%; ▌Tredwell Scudder (Unknown) 2.1%
New York 2	Joshua Sands	Anti-Jacksonian	1802; 1804 (retired); 1824	Incumbent retired. Jacksonian gain.	▌ ✓ John J. Wood (Jacksonian) 54.7%; ▌John T. Smith (Anti-Jacksonian) 45.3%
New York 3 Plural district with 3 seats	Churchill C. Cambreleng	Jacksonian	1821	Incumbent re-elected.	▌ ✓ Churchill C. Cambreleng (Jacksonian) 33.0%; ▌ ✓ Gulian C. Verplanck (Jacksonian) 20.7%; ▌ ✓ Jeromus Johnson (Jacksonian) 19.4%; ▌Pierre C. Van Wyck (Anti-Jacksonian) 13.8%; ▌Elisha W. King (Anti-Jacksonian) 13.1%
New York 3 Plural district with 3 seats	Gulian C. Verplanck	Jacksonian	1824	Incumbent re-elected.	▌ ✓ Churchill C. Cambreleng (Jacksonian) 33.0%; ▌ ✓ Gulian C. Verplanck (Jacksonian) 20.7%; ▌ ✓ Jeromus Johnson (Jacksonian) 19.4%; ▌Pierre C. Van Wyck (Anti-Jacksonian) 13.8%; ▌Elisha W. King (Anti-Jacksonian) 13.1%
New York 3 Plural district with 3 seats	Jeromus Johnson	Jacksonian	1824	Incumbent re-elected.	▌ ✓ Churchill C. Cambreleng (Jacksonian) 33.0%; ▌ ✓ Gulian C. Verplanck (Jacksonian) 20.7%; ▌ ✓ Jeromus Johnson (Jacksonian) 19.4%; ▌Pierre C. Van Wyck (Anti-Jacksonian) 13.8%; ▌Elisha W. King (Anti-Jacksonian) 13.1%
New York 4	Aaron Ward	Anti-Jacksonian	1824	Incumbent re-elected.	▌ ✓ Aaron Ward (Anti-Jacksonian) 59.6%; ▌John Haff (Jacksonian) 40.4%
New York 5	Bartow White	Anti-Jacksonian	1824	Incumbent retired. Jacksonian gain.	▌ ✓ Thomas J. Oakley (Jacksonian) 50.8%; ▌Edmund H. Pendleton (Anti-Jacksonian) 49.2%
New York 6	John Hallock Jr.	Jacksonian	1824	Incumbent re-elected.	▌ ✓ John Hallock Jr. (Jacksonian) 56.8%; ▌Hector Craig (Jacksonian) 43.2%
New York 7	Abraham B. Hasbrouck	Anti-Jacksonian	1824	Incumbent retired. Jacksonian gain.	▌ ✓ George O. Belden (Jacksonian) 50.7%; ▌Lemuel Jenkins (Jacksonian) 49.3%
New York 8	James Strong	Anti-Jacksonian	1818; 1821 (retired); 1822	Incumbent re-elected.	▌ ✓ James Strong (Anti-Jacksonian) 59.8%; Walter Patterson (A?) 40.2%
New York 9	William McManus	Anti-Jacksonian	1824	Incumbent retired. Anti-Jacksonian hold.	▌ ✓ John D. Dickinson (Anti-Jacksonian) 51.9%; ▌James L. Hogeboom (Jacksonian) 48.1%
New York 10	Stephen Van Rensselaer	Anti-Jacksonian	1822 (special)	Incumbent re-elected.	▌ ✓ Stephen Van Rensselaer (Anti-Jacksonian) 100%
New York 11	Henry Ashley	Jacksonian	1824	Incumbent retired. Jacksonian hold.	▌ ✓ Selah R. Hobbie (Jacksonian) 58.9%; ▌Isaac Burr (Anti-Jacksonian) 41.1%
New York 12	William Dietz	Jacksonian	1824	Incumbent retired. Jacksonian hold.	▌ ✓ John I. De Graff (Jacksonian) 100%
New York 13	William G. Angel	Anti-Jacksonian	1824	Incumbent retired. Anti-Jacksonian hold.	▌ ✓ Samuel Chase (Anti-Jacksonian) 50.9%; ▌George Morell (Jacksonian) 46.4%; ▌Isaac Hayes (Independent) 2.7%
New York 14	Henry R. Storrs	Anti-Jacksonian	1816; 1821 (retired); 1822	Incumbent re-elected.	▌ ✓ Henry R. Storrs (Anti-Jacksonian) 69.8%; ▌Ezekiel Bacon (Jacksonian) 30.2%
New York 15	Michael Hoffman	Jacksonian	1824	Incumbent re-elected.	▌ ✓ Michael Hoffman (Jacksonian) 59.5%; ▌Daniel Van Horn (Anti-Jacksonian) 40.5%
New York 16	Henry Markell	Anti-Jacksonian	1824	Incumbent re-elected.	▌ ✓ Henry Markell (Anti-Jacksonian) 51.6%; ▌Aaron Haring (Jacksonian) 48.4%
New York 17	John W. Taylor	Anti-Jacksonian	1812	Incumbent re-elected.	▌ ✓ John W. Taylor (Anti-Jacksonian) 57.5%; ▌Alpheus Goodrich (Jacksonian) 42.5%
New York 18	Henry C. Martindale	Anti-Jacksonian	1822	Incumbent re-elected.	▌ ✓ Henry C. Martindale (Anti-Jacksonian) 51.1%; ▌John Willard (Jacksonian) 48.9%
New York 19	Henry Ross	Anti-Jacksonian	1824	Incumbent retired. Jacksonian gain.	▌ ✓ Richard Keese (Jacksonian) 52.4%; ▌Asa Hascall (Anti-Jacksonian) 47.6%
New York 20 Plural district with 2 seats	Nicoll Fosdick	Anti-Jacksonian	1824	Incumbent lost re-election. Jacksonian gain.	▌ ✓ Silas Wright (Jacksonian) 26.1%; ▌ ✓ Rudolph Bunner (Jacksonian) 26.0%; ▌Nicoll Fosdick (Anti-Jacksonian) 24.0%; ▌Elisha Camp (Anti-Jacksonian) 23.9%
New York 20 Plural district with 2 seats	Daniel Hugunin Jr.	Anti-Jacksonian	1824	Incumbent retired. Jacksonian gain.	▌ ✓ Silas Wright (Jacksonian) 26.1%; ▌ ✓ Rudolph Bunner (Jacksonian) 26.0%; ▌Nicoll Fosdick (Anti-Jacksonian) 24.0%; ▌Elisha Camp (Anti-Jacksonian) 23.9%
New York 21	Elias Whitmore	Anti-Jacksonian	1824	Incumbent retired. Jacksonian gain.	▌ ✓ John C. Clark (Jacksonian) 52.6%; ▌Robert Monell (Jacksonian) 47.4%
New York 22	John Miller	Anti-Jacksonian	1824	Incumbent lost re-election. Jacksonian gain.	▌ ✓ John G. Stower (Jacksonian) 52.0%; ▌John Miller (Anti-Jacksonian) 48.0%
New York 23	Luther Badger	Anti-Jacksonian	1824	Incumbent lost re-election. Jacksonian gain.	▌ ✓ Jonas Earll Jr. (Jacksonian) 51.8%; ▌Luther Badger (Anti-Jacksonian) 48.2%
New York 24	Charles Kellogg	Jacksonian	1824	Incumbent retired. Jacksonian hold.	▌ ✓ Nathaniel Garrow (Jacksonian) 54.1%; ▌Elijah Miller (Anti-Jacksonian) 45.9%
New York 25	Charles Humphrey	Anti-Jacksonian	1824	Incumbent lost re-election. Anti-Jacksonian hold.	▌ ✓ David Woodcock (Anti-Jacksonian) 52.3%; ▌Charles Humphrey (Anti-Jacksonian) 47.7%
New York 26 Plural district with 2 seats	Dudley Marvin	Anti-Jacksonian	1822	Incumbent re-elected.	▌ ✓ Dudley Marvin (Anti-Jacksonian) 40.6%; ▌ ✓ John Maynard (Anti-Jacksonian) 27.9%; ▌Nathaniel Allen (Jacksonian) 20.9%; ▌John Knox (Jacksonian?) 10.6%
New York 26 Plural district with 2 seats	Robert S. Rose	Anti-Jacksonian	1822	Incumbent retired. Anti-Jacksonian hold.	▌ ✓ Dudley Marvin (Anti-Jacksonian) 40.6%; ▌ ✓ John Maynard (Anti-Jacksonian) 27.9%; ▌Nathaniel Allen (Jacksonian) 20.9%; ▌John Knox (Jacksonian?) 10.6%
New York 27	Moses Hayden	Anti-Jacksonian	1822	Incumbent retired. Anti-Jacksonian hold.	▌ ✓ Daniel D. Barnard (Anti-Jacksonian) 52.3%; ▌Enos Pomeroy 47.7%
New York 28	Timothy Porter	Anti-Jacksonian	1824	Incumbent lost re-election. Jacksonian gain.	▌ ✓ John Magee (Jacksonian) 40.8%; ▌Timothy Porter (Anti-Jacksonian) 28.9%; ▌William Woods (Anti-Jacksonian) 15.4%; ▌Philip Church (Independent) 14.9%
New York 29	Parmenio Adams	Anti-Jacksonian	1822	Incumbent retired. Jacksonian gain. Successor resigned May 27, 1827, leading to a special election.	▌ ✓ David E. Evans (Jacksonian) 54.2%; ▌Simeon Cumings (Anti-Jacksonian) 45.8%
New York 30	Daniel G. Garnsey	Anti-Jacksonian	1824	Incumbent re-elected as Jacksonian. Jacksonian gain.	▌ ✓ Daniel G. Garnsey (Jacksonian) 55.1%; ▌Phineas L. Tracy (Anti-Jacksonian) 44.9%

== North Carolina ==
North Carolina elected its members August 9, 1827, after the term began but before the new Congress convened.

District	Incumbent			This race	
District	Member	Party	First elected	Results	Candidates
North Carolina 1	Lemuel Sawyer	Jacksonian	1806; 1812 (lost); 1817; 1823 (lost); 1825	Incumbent re-elected.	▌ ✓ Lemuel Sawyer (Jacksonian) 65.1%; ▌William B. Shepard (Anti-Jacksonian) 34.9%
North Carolina 2	Willis Alston	Jacksonian	1798; 1815 (retired); 1825	Incumbent re-elected.	▌ ✓ Willis Alston (Jacksonian) 100%
North Carolina 3	Richard Hines	Jacksonian	1825	Incumbent lost re-election. Jacksonian hold.	▌ ✓ Thomas H. Hall (Jacksonian) 53.1%; ▌Richard Hines (Jacksonian) 46.9%
North Carolina 4	John H. Bryan	Anti-Jacksonian	1825	Incumbent re-elected.	▌ ✓ John H. Bryan (Anti-Jacksonian)
North Carolina 5	Gabriel Holmes	Jacksonian	1825	Incumbent re-elected.	▌ ✓ Gabriel Holmes (Jacksonian)
North Carolina 6	Weldon N. Edwards	Jacksonian	1816 (special)	Incumbent retired. Jacksonian hold.	▌ ✓ Daniel Turner (Jacksonian) 28.5%; ▌Charles A. Hill (Jacksonian) 26.8%; ▌Willis Boddick (Jacksonian) 20.0%; ▌William M. Sneed (Jacksonian) 15.8%; ▌Joseph M. Bryan (Jacksonian) 8.8%
North Carolina 7	Archibald McNeill	Jacksonian	1821; 1823 (Retired?); 1825	Incumbent retired. Anti-Jacksonian gain.	▌ ✓ John Culpepper (Anti-Jacksonian) 41.2%; ▌John A. Cameron (Anti-Jacksonian) 34.5%; ▌John Gilchrist (Unknown) 24.1%; ▌Thomas Davis (Unknown) 0.2%
North Carolina 8	Daniel L. Barringer	Jacksonian	1826 (special)	Incumbent re-elected.	▌ ✓ Daniel L. Barringer (Jacksonian) 53.3%; ▌Archibald Murphey (Anti-Jacksonian) 46.7%
North Carolina 9	Romulus M. Saunders	Jacksonian	1821	Incumbent retired. Jacksonian hold.	▌ ✓ Augustine H. Shepperd (Jacksonian) 64.6%; ▌Bedford Brown (Jacksonian) 35.4%
North Carolina 10	John Long	Anti-Jacksonian	1821	Incumbent re-elected.	▌ ✓ John Long (Anti-Jacksonian) 88.0%; ▌Asa Eubank (Independent) 10.9%; Others 1.1%
North Carolina 11	Henry W. Connor	Jacksonian	1821	Incumbent re-elected.	▌ ✓ Henry W. Connor (Jacksonian) 81.9%; ▌Samuel Henderson (Anti-Jacksonian) 18.1%
North Carolina 12	Samuel P. Carson	Jacksonian	1825	Incumbent re-elected.	▌ ✓ Samuel P. Carson (Jacksonian) 63.4%; ▌Robert B. Vance (Anti-Jacksonian) 26.6%
North Carolina 13	Lewis Williams	Anti-Jacksonian	1815	Incumbent re-elected.	▌ ✓ Lewis Williams (Anti-Jacksonian) 65.4%; ▌John Mushat (Unknown) 34.6%

Soon after the election, Samuel P. Carson (Jacksonian), the winner of the race in the 12th district, challenged his opponent, Robert B. Vance (Anti-Jacksonian) to a duel over a comment made during the campaign about Carson's father. Vance was mortally wounded in the duel. Carson left immediately afterwards to go to Washington.

== Ohio ==
Ohio elected its members October 10, 1826.

District	Incumbent			This race	
District	Member	Party	First elected	Results	Candidates
Ohio 1	James Findlay	Jacksonian	1824	Incumbent re-elected.	▌ ✓ James Findlay (Jacksonian) 44.7%; ▌David Morris (Anti-Jacksonian) 36.7%; ▌Thomas Morris (Jacksonian) 18.6%
Ohio 2	John Woods	Anti-Jacksonian	1824	Incumbent re-elected.	▌ ✓ John Woods (Anti-Jacksonian) 60.6%; ▌Thomas J. Ross (Jacksonian) 37.5%; ▌Robert Anderson (Unknown) 1.9%
Ohio 3	William McLean	Anti-Jacksonian	1822	Incumbent re-elected.	▌ ✓ William McLean (Anti-Jacksonian) 61.2%; ▌George B. Holt (Unknown) 33.2%; ▌Eastin Morris (Unknown) 5.6%
Ohio 4	Joseph Vance	Anti-Jacksonian	1820	Incumbent re-elected.	▌ ✓ Joseph Vance (Anti-Jacksonian) 89.6%; ▌Johnson (Unknown) 10.4%
Ohio 5	John W. Campbell	Anti-Jacksonian	1816	Incumbent retired. Jacksonian gain.	▌ ✓ William Russell (Jacksonian) 35.5%; ▌Richard Collins (Unknown) 24.3%; ▌Isaiah Morris (Unknown) 20.9%; ▌Abraham Shepherd (Unknown) 19.4%
Ohio 6	John Thomson	Jacksonian	1824	Incumbent lost re-election. Anti-Jacksonian gain.	▌ ✓ William Creighton Jr. (Anti-Jacksonian) 63.5%; ▌John Thomson (Jacksonian) 36.5%
Ohio 7	Samuel F. Vinton	Anti-Jacksonian	1822	Incumbent re-elected.	▌ ✓ Samuel F. Vinton (Anti-Jacksonian) 68.9%; ▌William Kendall (Unknown) 26.9%; ▌Daniel H. Buell (Unknown) 4.2%
Ohio 8	William Wilson	Anti-Jacksonian	1822	Incumbent re-elected.	▌ ✓ William Wilson (Anti-Jacksonian) 34.2%; ▌Lyne Starling (Unknown) 27.3%; ▌Daniel S. Norton (Unknown) 26.9%; ▌James Kilbourne (Unknown) 11.5%
Ohio 9	Philemon Beecher	Anti-Jacksonian	1816; 1820 (lost); 1822	Incumbent re-elected.	▌ ✓ Philemon Beecher (Anti-Jacksonian) 55.0%; ▌John Mathews (Jacksonian) 34.2%; ▌Robert McConnell (Unknown) 10.8%
Ohio 10	David Jennings	Anti-Jacksonian	1824	Incumbent resigned May 25, 1826. Anti-Jacksonian hold. Successor lost the election on the same day to finish the term.	▌ ✓ John Davenport (Anti-Jacksonian) 50.7%; ▌James Caldwell (Unknown) 29.5%; ▌John Patterson (Anti-Jacksonian) 8.9%; ▌James Barnes (Unknown) 5.4%
Ohio 11	John C. Wright	Anti-Jacksonian	1822	Incumbent re-elected.	▌ ✓ John C. Wright (Anti-Jacksonian) 35.5%; ▌Walter Bebee (Anti-Jacksonian) 32.4%; ▌John M. Goodenow (Jacksonian) 32.1%
Ohio 12	John Sloane	Anti-Jacksonian	1818	Incumbent re-elected.	▌ ✓ John Sloane (Anti-Jacksonian) 50.7%; ▌John Thompson (Jacksonian) 49.3%
Ohio 13	Elisha Whittlesey	Anti-Jacksonian	1822	Incumbent re-elected.	▌ ✓ Elisha Whittlesey (Anti-Jacksonian) 100%
Ohio 14	Mordecai Bartley	Anti-Jacksonian	1822	Incumbent re-elected.	▌ ✓ Mordecai Bartley (Anti-Jacksonian) 53.3%; ▌Eleutheros Cooke (Anti-Jacksonian) 46.7%

== Pennsylvania ==
Pennsylvania elected its members October 10, 1826.

District	Incumbent			This race	
District	Member	Party	First elected	Results	Candidates
Pennsylvania 1	John Wurts	Jacksonian	1824	Incumbent retired. Jacksonian hold.	▌ ✓ Joel B. Sutherland (Jacksonian) 55.8%; ▌Samuel Breck (Anti-Jacksonian) 26.7%; ▌William J. Duane (Jacksonian) 17.5%
Pennsylvania 2	Joseph Hemphill	Jacksonian	1800; 1802 (lost); 1818	Incumbent resigned before October 10, 1826. New member not elected due to tie vote between the top two candidates, leading to an October 9, 1827 special election. Jacksonian loss.	▌Henry Horn (Jacksonian) 34.8%; ▌John Sergeant (Anti-Jacksonian) 34.8%; ▌Thomas Kittera (Anti-Jacksonian) 30.3%
Pennsylvania 3	Daniel H. Miller	Jacksonian	1822	Incumbent re-elected.	▌ ✓ Daniel H. Miller (Jacksonian) 72.1%; ▌John Harrison (Unknown) 25.4%; ▌Jacob Sommert (Unknown) 2.5%
Pennsylvania 4 Plural district with 3 seats	James Buchanan	Jacksonian	1820	Incumbent re-elected.	▌ ✓ James Buchanan (Jacksonian) 18.5%; ▌ ✓ Samuel Anderson (Anti-Jacksonian) 17.8%; ▌ ✓ Charles Miner (Anti-Jacksonian) 17.6%; ▌Joshua Evans Jr. (Jacksonian) 15.5%; ▌John McCamant (Jacksonian) 15.3%; ▌George G. Leiper (Jacksonian) 15.2%
Pennsylvania 4 Plural district with 3 seats	Samuel Edwards	Jacksonian	1818	Incumbent retired. Anti-Jacksonian gain.	▌ ✓ James Buchanan (Jacksonian) 18.5%; ▌ ✓ Samuel Anderson (Anti-Jacksonian) 17.8%; ▌ ✓ Charles Miner (Anti-Jacksonian) 17.6%; ▌Joshua Evans Jr. (Jacksonian) 15.5%; ▌John McCamant (Jacksonian) 15.3%; ▌George G. Leiper (Jacksonian) 15.2%
Pennsylvania 4 Plural district with 3 seats	Charles Miner	Anti-Jacksonian	1824	Incumbent re-elected.	▌ ✓ James Buchanan (Jacksonian) 18.5%; ▌ ✓ Samuel Anderson (Anti-Jacksonian) 17.8%; ▌ ✓ Charles Miner (Anti-Jacksonian) 17.6%; ▌Joshua Evans Jr. (Jacksonian) 15.5%; ▌John McCamant (Jacksonian) 15.3%; ▌George G. Leiper (Jacksonian) 15.2%
Pennsylvania 5	Philip S. Markley	Anti-Jacksonian	1822	Incumbent lost re-election. Jacksonian gain.	▌ ✓ John B. Sterigere (Jacksonian) 55.0%; ▌Philip S. Markley (Anti-Jacksonian) 45.0%
Pennsylvania 6	Robert Harris	Jacksonian	1822	Incumbent retired. Jacksonian hold.	▌ ✓ Innis Green (Jacksonian) 62.2%; ▌John M. Forster (Unknown) 37.8%
Pennsylvania 7 Plural district with 2 seats	William Addams	Jacksonian	1824	Incumbent re-elected.	▌ ✓ William Addams (Jacksonian) 31.9%; ▌ ✓ Joseph Fry Jr. (Jacksonian) 29.0%; ▌Henry W. Conrad (Unknown) 21.2%; ▌James Dongan (Unknown) 17.9%
Pennsylvania 7 Plural district with 2 seats	Henry Wilson	Jacksonian	1822	Incumbent died August 14, 1826. Jacksonian hold. Successor not elected the same day to finish the current term.	▌ ✓ William Addams (Jacksonian) 31.9%; ▌ ✓ Joseph Fry Jr. (Jacksonian) 29.0%; ▌Henry W. Conrad (Unknown) 21.2%; ▌James Dongan (Unknown) 17.9%
Pennsylvania 8 Plural district with 2 seats	George Wolf	Jacksonian	1824	Incumbent re-elected.	▌ ✓ George Wolf (Jacksonian) 50.4%; ▌ ✓ Samuel D. Ingham (Jacksonian) 49.6%
Pennsylvania 8 Plural district with 2 seats	Samuel D. Ingham	Jacksonian	1812; 1818 (Resigned); 1822 (special)	Incumbent re-elected.	▌ ✓ George Wolf (Jacksonian) 50.4%; ▌ ✓ Samuel D. Ingham (Jacksonian) 49.6%
Pennsylvania 9 Plural district with 3 seats	George Kremer	Jacksonian	1822	Incumbent re-elected.	▌ ✓ Samuel McKean (Jacksonian) 33.8%; ▌ ✓ Espy Van Horne (Jacksonian) 33.5%; ▌ ✓ George Kremer (Jacksonian) 32.6%
Pennsylvania 9 Plural district with 3 seats	Espy Van Horne	Jacksonian	1824	Incumbent re-elected.	▌ ✓ Samuel McKean (Jacksonian) 33.8%; ▌ ✓ Espy Van Horne (Jacksonian) 33.5%; ▌ ✓ George Kremer (Jacksonian) 32.6%
Pennsylvania 9 Plural district with 3 seats	Samuel McKean	Jacksonian	1822	Incumbent re-elected.	
Pennsylvania 10	James S. Mitchell	Jacksonian	1820	Incumbent retired. Jacksonian hold.	▌ ✓ Adam King (Jacksonian) 54.6%; ▌John Garnder (Ind. Rep.) 45.4%
Pennsylvania 11 Plural district with 2 seats	James Wilson	Anti-Jacksonian	1822	Incumbent re-elected.	▌ ✓ James Wilson (Anti-Jacksonian) 34.7%; ▌ ✓ William Ramsey (Jacksonian) 28.0%; ▌James Dunlop (Unknown) 23.7%; ▌Samuel Alexander (Unknown) 13.6%
Pennsylvania 11 Plural district with 2 seats	John Findlay	Jacksonian	1821 (special)	Incumbent retired. Jacksonian hold.	▌ ✓ James Wilson (Anti-Jacksonian) 34.7%; ▌ ✓ William Ramsey (Jacksonian) 28.0%; ▌James Dunlop (Unknown) 23.7%; ▌Samuel Alexander (Unknown) 13.6%
Pennsylvania 12	John Mitchell	Jacksonian	1824	Incumbent re-elected.	▌ ✓ John Mitchell (Jacksonian) 45.4%; ▌Robert Allison (Anti-Jacksonian) 30.0%; ▌John Brown (Jacksonian) 24.7%
Pennsylvania 13	Alexander Thomson	Jacksonian	1824	Incumbent resigned May 1, 1826. Jacksonian hold. Successor was also elected the same day to finish the current term.	▌ ✓ Chauncey Forward (Jacksonian) 65.3%; ▌William Piper (Unknown) 34.7%
Pennsylvania 14	Andrew Stewart	Jacksonian	1820	Incumbent re-elected to a different party. Anti-Jacksonian gain.	▌ ✓ Andrew Stewart (Anti-Jacksonian) 75.2%; ▌Joshua Hart (Unknown) 24.8%
Pennsylvania 15	Joseph Lawrence	Anti-Jacksonian	1824	Incumbent re-elected.	▌ ✓ Joseph Lawrence (Anti-Jacksonian) 100%
Pennsylvania 16 Plural district with 2 seats	Robert Orr Jr.	Jacksonian	1825 (special)	Incumbent re-elected.	▌ ✓ Robert Orr Jr. (Jacksonian) 50.3%; ▌ ✓ James S. Stevenson (Jacksonian) 49.7%
Pennsylvania 16 Plural district with 2 seats	James S. Stevenson	Jacksonian	1824	Incumbent re-elected.	▌ ✓ Robert Orr Jr. (Jacksonian) 50.3%; ▌ ✓ James S. Stevenson (Jacksonian) 49.7%
Pennsylvania 17	George Plumer	Jacksonian	1820	Incumbent retired. Jacksonian hold.	▌ ✓ Richard Coulter (Jacksonian) 59.4%; ▌James Clarke (Jacksonian) 40.6%
Pennsylvania 18	Thomas H. Sill	Anti-Jacksonian	1826 (special)	Incumbent lost re-election. Jacksonian gain.	▌ ✓ Stephen Barlow (Jacksonian) 57.8%; ▌Thomas H. Sill (Anti-Jacksonian) 36.6%; ▌John Findley (Unknown) 5.5%

== Rhode Island ==
Rhode Island elected its members August 30, 1827, after the term began but before the new Congress convened.

District	Incumbent			This race	
District	Member	Party	First elected	Results	Candidates
Rhode Island at-large 2 seats on a general ticket	Tristam Burges	Anti-Jacksonian	1825	Incumbent re-elected.	▌ ✓ Tristam Burges (Anti-Jacksonian) 50.9%; ▌ ✓ Dutee J. Pearce (Anti-Jacksonian) 48.5%; Others 0.7%
Rhode Island at-large 2 seats on a general ticket	Dutee J. Pearce	Anti-Jacksonian	1825	Incumbent re-elected.	▌ ✓ Tristam Burges (Anti-Jacksonian) 50.9%; ▌ ✓ Dutee J. Pearce (Anti-Jacksonian) 48.5%; Others 0.7%

== South Carolina ==
South Carolina elected its members October 9–10, 1826.

District	Incumbent			This race	
District	Member	Party	First elected	Results	Candidates
South Carolina 1	William Drayton	Jacksonian	1825 (special)	Incumbent re-elected.	▌ ✓ William Drayton (Jacksonian)
South Carolina 2	James Hamilton Jr.	Jacksonian	1822 (special)	Incumbent re-elected.	▌ ✓ James Hamilton Jr. (Jacksonian) 100% (Note: Based on incomplete returns)
South Carolina 3	Thomas R. Mitchell	Jacksonian	1820; 1823 (lost); 1824	Incumbent re-elected.	▌ ✓ Thomas R. Mitchell (Jacksonian) 76.9%; ▌Robert B. Campbell (Anti-Jacksonian) 23.1%
South Carolina 4	Andrew R. Govan	Jacksonian	1822 (special)	Incumbent lost re-election. Jacksonian hold.	▌ ✓ William D. Martin (Jacksonian) 60.9%; ▌Andrew R. Govan (Jacksonian) 39.1%
South Carolina 5	George McDuffie	Jacksonian	1820	Incumbent re-elected.	▌ ✓ George McDuffie (Jacksonian)
South Carolina 6	John Wilson	Jacksonian	1820	Incumbent lost re-election. Jacksonian hold.	▌ ✓ Warren R. Davis (Jacksonian) 50.3%; ▌John Wilson (Jacksonian) 49.7%
South Carolina 7	Joseph Gist	Jacksonian	1820	Incumbent retired. Jacksonian hold.	▌ ✓ William T. Nuckolls (Jacksonian) 46.9%; ▌Samuel McCreary (Unknown) 38.6%; ▌James McKibbin (Unknown) 14.5%
South Carolina 8	John Carter	Jacksonian	1822 (special)	Incumbent re-elected.	▌ ✓ John Carter (Jacksonian) 100%
South Carolina 9	Starling Tucker	Jacksonian	1816	Incumbent re-elected.	▌ ✓ Starling Tucker (Jacksonian)

== Tennessee ==
Tennessee elected its members August 2–3, 1827, after the term began but before the new Congress convened.

District	Incumbent			This race	
District	Member	Party	First elected	Results	Candidates
Tennessee 1	John Blair	Jacksonian	1823	Incumbent re-elected.	▌ ✓ John Blair (Jacksonian) 55.8%; ▌John Tipton (Unknown) 42.4%; ▌John Rhea (Unknown) 1.8%
Tennessee 2	John Cocke	Jacksonian	1819	Incumbent retired. Jacksonian hold.	▌ ✓ Pryor Lea (Jacksonian) 40.1%; ▌Thomas D. Arnold (Anti-Jacksonian) 36.0%; ▌William B. Reese (Unknown) 23.9%
Tennessee 3	James C. Mitchell	Jacksonian	1825	Incumbent re-elected.	▌ ✓ James C. Mitchell (Jacksonian) 55.7%; ▌James I. Standifer (Jacksonian) 44.3%
Tennessee 4	Jacob C. Isacks	Jacksonian	1823	Incumbent re-elected.	▌ ✓ Jacob C. Isacks (Jacksonian) 100%
Tennessee 5	Robert Allen	Jacksonian	1819	Incumbent retired. Jacksonian hold.	▌ ✓ Robert Desha (Jacksonian) 61.1%; ▌John Hall (Unknown) 21.4%; ▌William Trousdale (Jacksonian) 17.5%
Tennessee 6	James K. Polk	Jacksonian	1825	Incumbent re-elected.	▌ ✓ James K. Polk (Jacksonian) 56.6%; ▌Lunsford M. Bramlett (Anti-Jacksonian) 43.4%
Tennessee 7	Sam Houston	Jacksonian	1823	Incumbent retired. Jacksonian hold.	▌ ✓ John Bell (Jacksonian) 55.7%; ▌Felix Grundy (Jacksonian) 44.3%
Tennessee 8	John H. Marable	Jacksonian	1825	Incumbent re-elected.	▌ ✓ John H. Marable (Jacksonian); ▌James B. Reynolds (Jacksonian)
Tennessee 9	Adam R. Alexander	Jacksonian	1823	Incumbent lost re-election. Jacksonian hold.	▌ ✓ Davy Crockett (Jacksonian) 49.1%; ▌Adam R. Alexander (Jacksonian) 30.5%; ▌William Arnold (Unknown) 20.3%

== Vermont ==
Vermont elected its members September 5, 1826. It required a majority for election, which was not met on the first vote in two districts, requiring additional elections held December 4, 1826, and February 5, 1827.

District	Incumbent			This race	
District	Member	Party	First elected	Results	Candidates
Vermont 1	William C. Bradley	Anti-Jacksonian	1812; 1814 (lost); 1822	Incumbent retired. Anti-Jacksonian hold.	First ballot (September 5, 1826): ▌Richard Skinner (Unknown) 25.2%; ▌Jonathan Hunt (Anti-Jacksonian) 24.2%; ▌Orsamus C. Merrill (Anti-Jacksonian) 12.5%; ▌Calvin Sheldon (Unknown) 12.5%; ▌John Phelps (Unknown) 9.8%; ▌Samuel Elliott (Unknown) 8.3%; ▌John S. Pettibone (Unknown) 4.0%; ▌Phineas White (Unknown) 3.6%; Second ballot (December 4, 1826): ▌Jonathan Hunt (Anti-Jacksonian) 40.5%; ▌Orsamus C. Merrill (Anti-Jacksonian) 25.5%; ▌Samuel Elliott (Unknown) 18.0%; ▌Calvin Sheldon (Unknown) 8.1%; ▌John Phelps (Unknown) 7.9%; Third ballot (February 5, 1827): ▌ ✓ Jonathan Hunt (Anti-Jacksonian) 52.6%; ▌Orsamus C. Merrill (Anti-Jacksonian) 47.4%
Vermont 2	Rollin C. Mallary	Anti-Jacksonian	1818	Incumbent re-elected.	▌ ✓ Rollin C. Mallary (Anti-Jacksonian) 100%
Vermont 3	George E. Wales	Anti-Jacksonian	1824	Incumbent re-elected.	▌ ✓ George E. Wales (Anti-Jacksonian) 100%
Vermont 4	Ezra Meech	Jacksonian	1818; 1820 (lost); 1824	Incumbent retired. Anti-Jacksonian gain.	First ballot (September 5, 1826): ▌Heman Allen (Anti-Jacksonian) 47.9%; ▌Benjamin Swift (Anti-Jacksonian) 46.3%; ▌Ira H. Allen (Unknown) 3.5%; ▌Samuel C. Crafts (Anti-Jacksonian) 2.4%; Second ballot (December 4, 1826): ▌Heman Allen (Anti-Jacksonian) 49.5%; ▌Benjamin Swift (Anti-Jacksonian) 47.4%; Others 3.1%; Third ballot (February 5, 1827): ▌ ✓ Benjamin Swift (Anti-Jacksonian) 51.8%; ▌Heman Allen (Anti-Jacksonian) 48.2%
Vermont 5	John Mattocks	Anti-Jacksonian	1820; 1822 (lost); 1824	Incumbent retired. Anti-Jacksonian hold.	▌ ✓ D. Azro A. Buck (Anti-Jacksonian) 74.0%; ▌James Bell (Unknown) 26.0%

== Virginia ==
Virginia elected its members April 30, 1827, after the term began but before the new Congress convened.

District	Incumbent			This race	
District	Member	Party	First elected	Results	Candidates
Virginia 1	Thomas Newton Jr.	Anti-Jacksonian	1801	Incumbent re-elected.	▌ ✓ Thomas Newton Jr. (Anti-Jacksonian) 64.3%; ▌George Loyall (Jacksonian) 35.7%
Virginia 2	James Trezvant	Jacksonian	1825	Incumbent re-elected.	▌ ✓ James Trezvant (Jacksonian) 100%
Virginia 3	William S. Archer	Jacksonian	1820 (special)	Incumbent re-elected.	▌ ✓ William S. Archer (Jacksonian) 100%
Virginia 4	Mark Alexander	Jacksonian	1819	Incumbent re-elected.	▌ ✓ Mark Alexander (Jacksonian) 100%
Virginia 5	George W. Crump	Jacksonian	1826 (special)	Incumbent retired. Jacksonian hold.	▌ ✓ John Randolph (Jacksonian) 100%
Virginia 6	Thomas Davenport	Jacksonian	1825	Incumbent re-elected.	▌ ✓ Thomas Davenport (Jacksonian) 100%
Virginia 7	Nathaniel H. Claiborne	Jacksonian	1825	Incumbent re-elected.	▌ ✓ Nathaniel H. Claiborne (Jacksonian) 67.7%; ▌William Campbell (Unknown) 32.3%
Virginia 8	Burwell Bassett	Jacksonian	1805; 1812 (lost); 1815; 1819 (retired); 1821	Incumbent re-elected.	▌ ✓ Burwell Bassett (Jacksonian) 100%
Virginia 9	Andrew Stevenson	Jacksonian	1821	Incumbent re-elected.	▌ ✓ Andrew Stevenson (Jacksonian) 100%
Virginia 10	William C. Rives	Jacksonian	1823	Incumbent re-elected.	▌ ✓ William C. Rives (Jacksonian) 100%
Virginia 11	Robert Taylor	Anti-Jacksonian	1825	Incumbent retired. Jacksonian gain.	▌ ✓ Philip P. Barbour (Jacksonian) 100%
Virginia 12	Robert S. Garnett	Jacksonian	1817	Incumbent retired. Jacksonian hold.	▌ ✓ John Roane (Jacksonian) 100%
Virginia 13	John Taliaferro	Anti-Jacksonian	1801; 1803 (retired); 1811 (challenge); 1813 (lost); 1824 (special)	Incumbent re-elected.	▌ ✓ John Taliaferro (Anti-Jacksonian) 76.5%; ▌John Hungerford (Unknown) 20.8%; ▌Augustin Neal (Unknown) 2.7%
Virginia 14	Charles F. Mercer	Anti-Jacksonian	1817	Incumbent re-elected.	▌ ✓ Charles F. Mercer (Anti-Jacksonian) 63.0%; ▌Robert Thompson (Unknown) 37.0%
Virginia 15	John S. Barbour	Jacksonian	1823	Incumbent re-elected.	▌ ✓ John S. Barbour (Jacksonian) 65.0%; ▌William E. Hunton (Unknown) 35.0%
Virginia 16	William Armstrong	Anti-Jacksonian	1825	Incumbent re-elected.	▌ ✓ William Armstrong (Anti-Jacksonian) 78.0%; ▌John Peters (Unknown) 22.0%
Virginia 17	Alfred H. Powell	Anti-Jacksonian	1825	Incumbent lost re-election. Jacksonian gain.	▌ ✓ Robert Allen (Jacksonian) 51.3%; ▌Alfred H. Powell (Anti-Jacksonian) 45.1%; ▌Samuel Kerceval (Jacksonian) 3.6%
Virginia 18	Joseph Johnson	Jacksonian	1823	Incumbent lost re-election. Anti-Jacksonian gain.	▌ ✓ Isaac Leffler (Anti-Jacksonian) 54.4%; ▌Joseph Johnson (Jacksonian) 42.3%; ▌Thomas Haymond (Anti-Jacksonian) 3.3%
Virginia 19	William McCoy	Jacksonian	1811	Incumbent re-elected.	▌ ✓ William McCoy (Jacksonian)
Virginia 20	John Floyd	Jacksonian	1817	Incumbent re-elected.	▌ ✓ John Floyd (Jacksonian) 87.2%; ▌Edward Watts (Unknown) 12.8%
Virginia 21	William Smith	Jacksonian	1821	Incumbent retired. Anti-Jacksonian gain.	▌ ✓ Lewis Maxwell (Anti-Jacksonian) 47.2%; ▌Joseph Lovell (Anti-Jacksonian) 44.9%; ▌Ballard Smith (Jacksonian) 7.9%
Virginia 22	Benjamin Estil	Anti-Jacksonian	1825	Incumbent retired. Jacksonian gain.	▌ ✓ Alexander Smyth (Jacksonian) 72.4%; ▌Sharp (Unknown) 27.6%

== Non-voting delegates ==
District	Incumbent			This race	
District	Delegate	Party	First elected	Results	Candidates
Arkansas Territory	Henry Conway	Unknown	1822	Incumbent re-elected. Incumbent then died November 9, 1827, leading to a special election.	▌ ✓ Henry Conway (Unknown)
Florida Territory	Joseph M. White	Jacksonian	1824	Incumbent re-elected.	▌ ✓ Joseph M. White (Jacksonian)
Michigan Territory	Austin E. Wing	Anti-Jacksonian	1824	Incumbent re-elected.	▌ ✓ Austin E. Wing (Anti-Jacksonian)

== See also ==
- 1826 United States elections
  - List of United States House of Representatives elections (1824–1854)
  - 1826–27 United States Senate elections
- 19th United States Congress
- 20th United States Congress

== Bibliography ==
- Dubin, Michael J. (March 1, 1998). United States Congressional Elections, 1788-1997: The Official Results of the Elections of the 1st Through 105th Congresses. McFarland and Company. ISBN 978-0786402830.
- Martis, Kenneth C. (January 1, 1989). The Historical Atlas of Political Parties in the United States Congress, 1789-1989. Macmillan Publishing Company. ISBN 978-0029201701.
- Moore, John L., ed. (1994). Congressional Quarterly's Guide to U.S. Elections (Third ed.). Congressional Quarterly Inc. ISBN 978-0871879967.
- "Party Divisions of the House of Representatives* 1789–Present". Office of the Historian, House of United States House of Representatives.
