= 1826 Kentucky's 5th congressional district special election =

A special election was held in Kentucky's 5th congressional district on November 6, 1826, to fill a vacancy caused by the death of James Johnson (Jacksonian) on August 14, 1826.

== Election results ==
| Candidate | Party | Votes | Percent |
|---|---|---|---|
| Robert L. McHatton | Jacksonian | 1,479 | 34.3% |
| Alfred Sanford | Anti-Jacksonian | 1,167 | 27.1% |
| Nicholas D. Coleman | Jacksonian | 987 | 22.9% |
| William Brown | Anti-Jacksonian | 677 | 15.7% |

== Details ==
| Candidates: | Robert MacHatton[1] | Alfred Sandford | Nicholas D. Coleman | William Brown |
|---|---|---|---|---|
| Affiliation: | Democrat | | | |
| Final Result: | 1479 | 1167 | 987 | 677 |
| District of Five | 1479 | 1167 | 987 | 677 |
| Boone County | 78 | 391 | 337 | 21 |
| Campbell County | 161 | 422 | 125 | 39 |
| Grant County | 221 | 53 | 29 | 44 |
| Harrison County | 337 | 20 | 313 | 384 |
| Pendelton County | 63 | 21 | 74 | 89 |
| Scott County | 619 | 260 | 109 | 100 |

== Result ==
McHatton took his seat on December 7, 1826.

== See also ==
- List of special elections to the United States House of Representatives
