= 1826 Ohio's 10th congressional district special election =

A special election was held in Ohio's 10th congressional district on October 10, 1826, the same day as the general elections for the 20th Congress, to fill a vacancy caused by the resignation of David Jennings (A) on May 25, 1826.

== Election returns ==
Candidate	Party	Votes	Percent
Thomas Shannon	Anti-Jacksonian	2,621	37.0%
John Patterson	Anti-Jacksonian	2,276	32.2%
David Robb	Unknown	1,269	17.9%
Zaccheus Beatty	Unknown	913	12.9%

Shannon took his seat on December 4, 1826, and served only for the remainder of the 19th Congress. He did not run in the general election for the 20th Congress.

== See also ==
- List of special elections to the United States House of Representatives
- 1826 United States House of Representatives elections in Ohio
