= Benedict Joseph Semmes =

American politician

Benedict Joseph Semmes (November 1, 1789 – February 10, 1863) was an American politician.

Born in Charles County, Maryland, Semmes attended the rural schools and a medical college in Philadelphia. He graduated from Baltimore Medical School in 1811 and commenced practice in Prince George's County, Maryland. He later engaged in farming.

Semmes served as a member of the Maryland House of Delegates from 1825 to 1828 and served as speaker. He served in the Maryland State Senate, and was elected as an Anti-Jacksonian to the Twenty-first and Twenty-second Congresses, serving from March 4, 1829, to March 3, 1833. He was again a member of the Maryland House of Delegates in 1842 and 1843. He lived in retirement until his death at Oak Lawn in Prince George's County.

Political offices
Preceded by William Hammond Marriott	Speaker of the Maryland House of Delegates; 1825	Succeeded by John Grant Chapman
U.S. House of Representatives
Preceded by John Crompton Weems	Member of the U.S. House of Representatives from Maryland's 2nd congressional district 1829–1833	Succeeded by Richard Bennett Carmichael
