= John Telemachus Johnson =

Attorney, politician, and Stone-Campbell minister

John T. Johnson
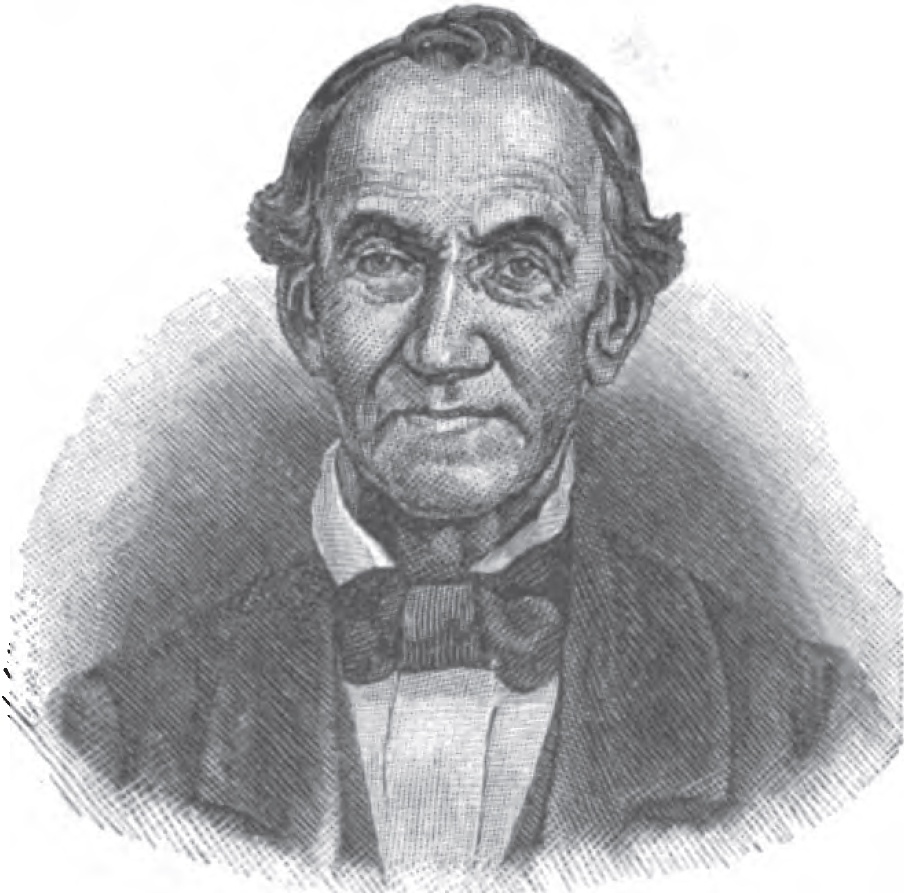

Member of the U.S. House of Representatives from Kentucky
- In office March 4, 1821 – March 3, 1825
- Preceded by: William Brown (3rd); Anthony New (5th)
- Succeeded by: Henry Clay (3rd); James Johnson (5th)
- Constituency: 3rd district (1821-23); 5th district (1823-25)

Personal details
- Born: October 5, 1788 Scott County, Kentucky
- Died: December 17, 1856 (aged 68) Lexington, Missouri
- Resting place: Lexington Cemetery
- Party: Democratic-Republican; Democrat
- Relatives: Richard Mentor Johnson (brother); James Johnson (brother); Robert Ward Johnson (nephew)
- Education: Transylvania University
- Profession: Lawyer, Minister
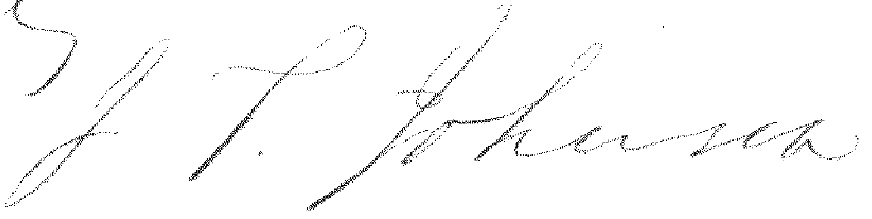
- Signature

Military service
- Battles/wars: War of 1812

John Telemachus Johnson (October 5, 1788 – December 17, 1856) was a minister in the Christian Church, an attorney, and a politician, elected as U.S. Representative from Kentucky. His older brothers, also politicians, included James Johnson and Richard M. Johnson, who served as Vice President under Martin Van Buren; he was the uncle of Robert Ward Johnson, also a politician.

== Early life and education ==
Born at Great Crossings, in present-day Scott County, Kentucky, Johnson pursued preparatory studies after being home schooled. He attended Transylvania University, in Lexington, Kentucky.

Like his older brother Richard, he studied law. He was admitted to the bar in 1809 and commenced practice in Georgetown, Kentucky. He owned slaves. Johnson served in the Kentucky Militia during the War of 1812 as an aide-de-camp to General William H. Harrison.

== Political career ==
Johnson was elected as a member of the Kentucky House of Representatives, serving for five terms.

He was elected in 1820 as a Democratic-Republican to the Seventeenth Congress and reelected as a Jackson Democrat to the Eighteenth Congress (March 4, 1821 – March 3, 1825). While in Congress, Johnson served as chairman of the Committee on the Post Office and Post Roads (Eighteenth Congress). He declined to run in 1824.

During the Old Court – New Court controversy, he was appointed as a justice of the new Kentucky Court of Appeals on April 20, 1826, and served until the new court and his tenure was nullified on December 30, 1826.

Johnson was ordained as a minister of the Christian Church, where he served for a number of years. He became active in publishing Christian journalism. He became editor of the Christian Messenger in 1832, the Gospel Advocate in 1835, and the Christian in 1837.

In 1836, Johnson was instrumental in establishing Bacon College at Georgetown, Kentucky.

He died in Lexington, Missouri, December 17, 1856. He was interred at Lexington Cemetery.

== See also ==
- The Family (Arkansas politics)
- Shropshire House

U.S. House of Representatives
Preceded by William Brown	Member of the U.S. House of Representatives from Kentucky's 3rd congressional district 1821–1823	Succeeded by Henry Clay
Preceded by Anthony New	Member of the U.S. House of Representatives from Kentucky's 5th congressional district 1823–1825	Succeeded by James Johnson
