= 1826 Pennsylvania's 13th congressional district special election =

On May 1, 1826, Alexander Thomson (J) of Pennsylvania's 13th district resigned. A special election was held to fill the resulting vacancy on October 10, 1826, the same day as the general elections to the 20th Congress.

== Election results ==
Candidate	Party	Votes	Percent
Chauncey Forward	Jacksonian	2,597	65.3%
William Piper		1,378	34.7%

Forward took his seat on December 4, 1826, at the start of the Second Session of Congress.

== See also ==
- List of special elections to the United States House of Representatives
