= 1827 Pennsylvania's 2nd congressional district special election =

In the 1826 elections in Pennsylvania, a tie vote occurred in the 2nd district. As a result, no candidate won in that district and a special election was held on October 9, 1827.

== Election results ==
Candidate	Party	Votes	Percent
John Sergeant	Anti-Jacksonian	2,702	51.4%
Joseph Hemphill	Jacksonian	2,557	48.6%

Sergeant took his seat at the start of the First Session of the 20th Congress. His election was unsuccessfully contested.

== See also ==
- List of special elections to the United States House of Representatives
