= Maryland's 2nd congressional district =

U.S. House district for Maryland

Coordinates: 39.3°N 76.5°W

- Interactive map of district boundaries since January 3, 2023
- Representative: Johnny Olszewski; D–Sparrows Point
- Area: 359 mi^{2} (930 km^{2})
- Distribution: 98.3% urban; 1.7% rural
- Population (2025): 768,745
- Median household income: $105,185
- Ethnicity: 59.4% White; 23.7% Black; 6.1% Asian; 6.0% Hispanic; 4.1% Two or more races; 0.7% other
- Occupation: 61.5% White-collar; 23% Blue-collar; 15.5% Gray-collar
- Cook PVI: D+10

Maryland's 2nd congressional district elects a representative to the United States House of Representatives every two years. The district comprises parts of Carroll and Baltimore counties, as well as a sliver of Baltimore City. The seat has been represented by Johnny Olszewski of the Democratic Party since 2025.

== Historical boundaries ==
When it was first organized in the late 1780s, the Maryland 2nd congressional district consisted of the northern portion of the eastern shore of Maryland and the area where the Susquehanna River empties into the Chesapeake Bay. It had a population of 55,008 in 1790.

After the 1790 census, Maryland gained two seats in the house. The new 2nd district consisted of Howard County, Prince George's County and Anne Arundel County. The boundary ran on a line heading north-east from the north-west corner of the District of Columbia so that a small portion of Montgomery County was also in the 2nd district.

This configuration remained the boundary of the district until the post–1830 census redistricting. At this time the 2nd district was moved back to the eastern shore region where it had been at first. The only change between the district's boundaries in 1790 and those in 1834 was that in the latter year Caroline County was part of the 2nd district.

In the 1842 redistricting, which involved a decrease in the total number of representatives, Maryland went back to having only six members of the house. The second district was moved again and comprised the Maryland Panhandle, that is all of Maryland starting with Frederick County and going west.

The post-1850 census redistricting caused another drastic redrawing of Maryland's congressional districts. The second district was moved back to the East side of the state. However this time it only had the eastern shore as far south as Kent County. However, going westward it included Harford County, northern and western Baltimore County, and the western and most southerly portions of Baltimore. It also took in Carroll County.

In the 1862 redistricting process, Maryland was reduced to having only five congressional districts. The second was cut down in size though to only having Harford County, eastern and northern Baltimore County including some areas now within the city boundaries on Baltimore.

In the 1872 redistricting, the number of Maryland districts was increased to six. However the area of the 2nd district increased. This was partly because it lost some of its area on the east side of Baltimore to the third district. It now also consisted of virtually all of Baltimore county, and the northern reaches of Baltimore. Cecil County was returned to its area, but Kent County remained in the first district. Carroll County was also put back in the second district. Thus the second district in 1873 was closer to that of 1853 than of 1871 in terms of the area within its boundaries.

In 1890, there was a small portion of the city of Baltimore that was moved from the 4th district and placed in the 7th district. It appears this was in the general area where Freemont meets Fulton and then a little further south along Freemont. These boundaries remained until the 1898 elections. In that year a few more north-west Baltimore neighborhoods were transferred from the 4th to the 2nd district, as well as a few north-central Baltimore neighborhoods.

In 1902, another change was done to congressional district boundaries in Maryland. With the northward growth of population in Baltimore the 4th and 3rd districts boundaries were moved into areas previously in the 2nd district. however areas in north-west Baltimore that were closer to down-town were shifted into the 2nd district. Cecil County was moved to the first district. The arm of Baltimore County around Arbutus had long been in the 5th District but at this point it was transferred into the 2nd district. These remained the boundaries of the 2nd district for the next 50 years.

In 1952, Maryland redrew its congressional districts because it had gained another seat in Congress. The 2nd district lost all of its area within the city of Baltimore, so it now consisted of Baltimore, Carroll and Harford Counties.

In 1966, Maryland redrew its congressional districts to follow the rule of "One man, one vote". This was especially necessary since the state had been electing one of its congressmen at large in the previous two elections. A portion of Baltimore County along Baltimore's north-east border was removed from the 2nd district. The Arbutus section of Baltimore county was also removed from the district along with a slightly further north portion of the county reaching to about Garrison. Most of Carroll County was moved to the Maryland panhandle based 6th district.

In 1972, Harford County was moved to the First District. The remaining portion of Carroll County was moved to the 6th district. However the Garrison area of Baltimore County, all of Baltimore county east of Baltimore and even a very small part of Baltimore itself were moved back into the second district.

In 1982, some of the areas that had been in the 2nd district just north and west of Baltimore were moved into Maryland's 3rd congressional district. At the same time, a part of Harford County was moved back into the 2nd congressional district.

In 2012, the district was found to be the eleventh least compact congressional district in the United States.

== Recent election results from statewide races ==
Year	Office	Results
2008	President	Obama 52% – 46%
2012	President	Obama 54% – 46%
2012	Senate	Cardin 48% – 30%
2014	Governor	Hogan 64% – 36%
2016	President	Clinton 52% – 41%
2016	Senate	Van Hollen 52% – 44%
2018	Senate	Cardin 57% – 36%
2018	Governor	Hogan 64% – 35%
2018	Attorney General	Frosh 57% – 43%
2020	President	Biden 59% – 38%
2022	Senate	Van Hollen 61% – 39%
2022	Governor	Moore 60% – 36%
2022	Comptroller	Lierman 56% – 44%
2022	Attorney General	Brown 60% – 40%
2024	President	Harris 57% – 39%
2024	Senate	Hogan 49% – 48%

== Composition ==
For the 118th and successive Congresses (based on redistricting following the 2020 census), the district contains all or portions of the following counties and communities:

Baltimore County (24)

Bowleys Quarters, Carney, Catonsville (part; also 7th), Cockeysville, Essex, Garrison, Hampton (part; also 1st), Lutherville, Mays Chapel, Middle River (part; also 1st), Milford Mill (part; also 7th), Overlea, Owings Mills, Parkville, Perry Hall (part; also 1st), Pikesville, Randallstown, Reisterstown, Rosedale (part; also 7th), Rossville, Timonium, Towson, White Marsh (part; also 1st), Woodlawn (part; also 7th)

Carroll County (8)

Eldersburg (part; also 3rd), Hampstead, Manchester, New Windsor, Sykesville, Taneytown, Union Bridge, Westminster

Independent cities (1)

Baltimore (part; also 7th)

== Recent elections ==
=== 2000s ===
Maryland's 2nd Congressional District: 2000
Party	Candidate	Votes	%
Republican	Robert Ehrlich (incumbent)	178,556	68.6
Democratic	Kenneth T. Bosley	81,591	31.3
Write-ins		285	0.1
Total votes		260,432	100.00

Maryland's 2nd Congressional District: 2002
Party	Candidate	Votes	%
Democratic	Dutch Ruppersberger (incumbent)	105,718	54.3
Republican	Helen Bentley	88,954	45.7
Total votes		194,672	100.00
Democratic gain from Republican			

Maryland's 2nd Congressional District: 2004
Party	Candidate	Votes	%
Democratic	Dutch Ruppersberger (incumbent)	164,751	66.7
Republican	Jane Brooks	75,812	30.7
Green	Helen Bentley	6,508	2.6
Total votes		247,071	100.00

Maryland's 2nd Congressional District: 2006
Party	Candidate	Votes	%	±%
Democratic	Dutch Ruppersberger (inc.)	135,818	69.21%	+2.53
Republican	Jimmy Mathis	60,195	30.68%	−
Write-ins		215	0.11%	
Total votes		196,228	100.00	
Democratic hold				

Maryland's 2nd Congressional District: 2008
Party	Candidate	Votes	%	±%
Democratic	Dutch Ruppersberger (incumbent)	198,578	71.86%	+2.65
Republican	Richard Matthews	68,561	24.81%	−5.87
Libertarian	Lorenzo Gaztanaga	8,786	3.18%	+3.18
No party	Write-ins	408	0.15	
Total votes		276,333	100.00	
Democratic hold		Swing		

=== 2010s ===
Maryland's 2nd Congressional District: 2010
Party	Candidate	Votes	%	±%
Democratic	Dutch Ruppersberger (incumbent)	134,133	64.21%	−7.65
Republican	Marcelo Cardarelli	69,523	33.28%	+8.47
Libertarian	Lorenzo Gaztanaga	5,090	2.44%	−0.74
No party	Write-ins	158	0.08%	
Total votes		208,904	100.00	
Democratic hold				

Maryland's 2nd Congressional District: 2012
Party	Candidate	Votes	%
Democratic	Dutch Ruppersberger (incumbent)	194,088	65.6
Republican	Nancy Jacobs	92,071	31.1
Libertarian	Leo Wayne Dymowski	9,344	3.2
n/a	Write-ins	437	0.1
Total votes		295,940	100.0
Democratic hold			

Maryland's 2nd Congressional District: 2014
Party	Candidate	Votes	%
Democratic	Dutch Ruppersberger (incumbent)	120,412	61.3
Republican	David Banach	70,411	35.9
Green	Ian Schlakman	5,326	2.7
n/a	Write-ins	205	0.1
Total votes		196,354	100.0
Democratic hold			

Maryland's 2nd Congressional District: 2016
Party	Candidate	Votes	%
Democratic	Dutch Ruppersberger (incumbent)	192,183	62.1
Republican	Pat McDonough	102,577	33.1
Libertarian	Kristin S. Kasprzak	14,128	4.6
n/a	Write-ins	592	0.2
Total votes		309,480	100.0
Democratic hold			

Maryland's 2nd Congressional District: 2018
Party	Candidate	Votes	%
Democratic	Dutch Ruppersberger (incumbent)	167,201	66.0
Republican	Liz Matory	77,782	30.7
Libertarian	Michael Carney	5,215	2.1
Green	Guillaume "Guy" Mimoun	2,904	1.1
n/a	Write-ins	200	0.1
Total votes		253,302	100.0
Democratic hold			

=== 2020s ===
Maryland's 2nd Congressional District: 2020
Party	Candidate	Votes	%
Democratic	Dutch Ruppersberger (incumbent)	224,836	67.7
Republican	Johnny Ray Salling	106,355	32.0
Write-in		835	0.3
Total votes		332,026	100.0
Democratic hold			

Maryland's 2nd Congressional District: 2022
Party	Candidate	Votes	%
Democratic	Dutch Ruppersberger (incumbent)	158,998	59.2
Republican	Nicolee Ambrose	109,075	40.6
Write-in		361	0.1
Total votes		268,434	100.0
Democratic hold			

Maryland's 2nd Congressional District: 2024
Party	Candidate	Votes	%
Democratic	Johnny Olszewski	223,797	58.16
Republican	Kim Klacik	152,079	39.52
Libertarian	Jasen Joseph Wunder	8,169	2.12
Write-in		749	0.19
Total votes		384,794	100.0
Democratic hold			

== List of members representing the district ==
Member	Years	Cong ress	Party	Electoral history	Location
District created March 4, 1789
Joshua Seney (Queen Anne's County)	March 4, 1789 – December 6, 1792	1st 2nd	Anti-Administration	Elected in 1789. Re-elected in 1790. Resigned to become Chief Justice of Maryland's 3rd Judicial District.	
Vacant	December 6, 1792 – January 30, 1793	2nd			
William Hindman (Talbot County)	January 30, 1793 – March 3, 1793	2nd	Pro-Administration	Elected January 7, 1793 to finish Seney's term and seated January 30, 1793 having already been elected in the 7th district.	
John Francis Mercer (Anne Arundel County)	March 4, 1793 – April 13, 1794	3rd	Anti-Administration	Redistricted from the 3rd district and re-elected in 1792. Resigned.	
Vacant	April 13, 1794 – November 11, 1794	3rd			
Gabriel Duvall (Prince George's County)	November 11, 1794 – March 3, 1795	3rd 4th	Anti-Administration	Elected May 5, 1794 to finish Mercer's term. Re-elected in 1794. Resigned to become Chief Justice of General Court of Maryland.	
Gabriel Duvall (Prince George's County)	March 4, 1795 – March 28, 1796	3rd 4th	Democratic-Republican	Elected May 5, 1794 to finish Mercer's term. Re-elected in 1794. Resigned to become Chief Justice of General Court of Maryland.	
Vacant	March 28, 1796 – May 5, 1796	4th			
Richard Sprigg Jr. (Prince George's County)	May 5, 1796 – March 3, 1799	4th 5th	Democratic-Republican	Elected to finish Duvall's term. Re-elected in 1796. Lost re-election.	
John Chew Thomas (Fairland)	March 4, 1799 – March 3, 1801	6th	Federalist	Elected in 1798. Lost re-election.	
Richard Sprigg Jr. (Prince George's County)	March 4, 1801 – February 11, 1802	7th	Democratic-Republican	Elected in 1801. Resigned.	
Vacant	February 11, 1802 – March 24, 1802	7th			
Walter Bowie (Collington)	March 24, 1802 – March 3, 1805	7th 8th	Democratic-Republican	Elected March 2, 1802 to finish Sprigg's term. Re-elected in 1803. Retired.	
Leonard Covington (Prince George's County)	March 4, 1805 – March 3, 1807	9th	Democratic-Republican	Elected in 1804. Lost re-election.	
Archibald Van Horne (Prince George's County)	March 4, 1807 – March 3, 1811	10th 11th	Democratic-Republican	Elected in 1806. Re-elected in 1808. Retired.	
Joseph Kent (Bladensburg)	March 4, 1811 – March 3, 1815	12th 13th	Democratic-Republican	Elected in 1810. Re-elected in 1812. Lost re-election.	
John Carlyle Herbert (Vannsville)	March 4, 1815 – March 3, 1819	14th 15th	Federalist	Elected in 1814. Re-elected in 1816. Retired.	
Joseph Kent (Bladensburg)	March 4, 1819 – March 3, 1825	16th 17th 18th 19th	Democratic-Republican (Note: Supported the Adams-Clay faction in the 1824 United States presidential election)	Elected in 1818. Re-elected in 1820. Re-elected in 1822. Re-elected in 1824. Resigned to become Governor of Maryland.	
Joseph Kent (Bladensburg)	March 4, 1825 – January 6, 1826	16th 17th 18th 19th	Anti-Jackson	Elected in 1818. Re-elected in 1820. Re-elected in 1822. Re-elected in 1824. Resigned to become Governor of Maryland.	
Vacant	January 6, 1826 – February 1, 1826	19th			
John Crompton Weems (Waterloo)	February 1, 1826 – March 3, 1829	19th 20th	Jackson	Elected to finish Kent's term. Re-elected in 1826. [data missing]	
Benedict Joseph Semmes (Piscataway)	March 4, 1829 – March 3, 1833	21st 22nd	Anti-Jackson	Elected in 1829. Re-elected in 1831. [data missing]	
Richard Bennett Carmichael (Centerville)	March 4, 1833 – March 3, 1835	23rd	Jackson	Elected in 1833. [data missing]	
James Alfred Pearce (Chestertown)	March 4, 1835 – March 3, 1839	24th 25th	Whig	Elected in 1835. Re-elected in 1837. [data missing]	
Philip Francis Thomas (Easton)	March 4, 1839 – March 3, 1841	26th	Democratic	Elected in 1839. [data missing]	
James Alfred Pearce (Chestertown)	March 4, 1841 – March 3, 1843	27th	Whig	Elected in 1841. [data missing]	
Francis Brengle (Frederick)	March 4, 1843 – March 3, 1845	28th	Whig	Elected late in 1844. [data missing]	
Thomas Johns Perry (Cumberland)	March 4, 1845 – March 3, 1847	29th	Democratic	Elected in 1845. [data missing]	
James Dixon Roman (Hagerstown)	March 4, 1847 – March 3, 1849	30th	Whig	Elected in 1847. [data missing]	
William Thomas Hamilton (Hagerstown)	March 4, 1849 – March 3, 1853	31st 32nd	Democratic	Elected in 1849. Re-elected in 1851. Redistricted to the 5th district.	
Jacob Shower (Manchester)	March 4, 1853 – March 3, 1855	33rd	Democratic	Elected in 1853. [data missing]	
James Barroll Ricaud (Chestertown)	March 4, 1855 – March 3, 1859	34th 35th	Know Nothing	Elected in 1855. Re-elected in 1857. [data missing]	
Edwin Hanson Webster (Bel Air)	March 4, 1859 – March 3, 1861	36th 37th 38th 39th	Know Nothing	Elected in 1859. Re-elected in 1861. Re-elected in 1863. Re-elected in 1864. Resigned after being appointed collector of customs at the port of Baltimore.	
Edwin Hanson Webster (Bel Air)	March 4, 1861 – March 3, 1863	36th 37th 38th 39th	Union	Elected in 1859. Re-elected in 1861. Re-elected in 1863. Re-elected in 1864. Resigned after being appointed collector of customs at the port of Baltimore.	
Edwin Hanson Webster (Bel Air)	March 4, 1863 – July 1865	36th 37th 38th 39th	Unconditional Union	Elected in 1859. Re-elected in 1861. Re-elected in 1863. Re-elected in 1864. Resigned after being appointed collector of customs at the port of Baltimore.	
Vacant	July 1865 – December 4, 1865	39th			
John Lewis Thomas Jr. (Baltimore)	December 4, 1865 – March 3, 1867	39th	Unconditional Union	Elected to finish Webster's term. [data missing]	
Stevenson Archer (Bel Air)	March 4, 1867 – March 3, 1875	40th 41st 42nd 43rd	Democratic	Elected in 1866. Re-elected in 1868. Re-elected in 1870. Re-elected in 1872. [data missing]	
Charles Boyle Roberts (Westminster)	March 4, 1875 – March 3, 1879	44th 45th	Democratic	Elected in 1874. Re-elected in 1876. [data missing]	
Joshua Frederick Cockey Talbott (Towsontown)	March 4, 1879 – March 3, 1885	46th 47th 48th	Democratic	Elected in 1878. Re-elected in 1880. Re-elected in 1882. [data missing]	
Frank Thomas Shaw (Westminster)	March 4, 1885 – March 3, 1889	49th 50th	Democratic	Elected in 1884. Re-elected in 1886. [data missing]	
Herman Stump (Centerville)	March 4, 1889 – March 3, 1893	51st 52nd	Democratic	Elected in 1888. Re-elected in 1890. [data missing]	
Joshua Frederick Cockey Talbott (Towson)	March 4, 1893 – March 3, 1895	53rd	Democratic	Elected in 1892. [data missing]	
William Benjamin Baker (Aberdeen)	March 4, 1895 – March 3, 1901	54th 55th 56th	Republican	Elected in 1894. Re-elected in 1896. Re-elected in 1898. [data missing]	
Albert Alexander Blakeney (Franklinville)	March 4, 1901 – March 3, 1903	57th	Republican	Elected in 1900. [data missing]	
Joshua Frederick Cockey Talbott (Lutherville)	March 4, 1903 – October 5, 1918	58th 59th 60th 61st 62nd 63rd 64th 65th	Democratic	Elected in 1902. Re-elected in 1904. Re-elected in 1906. Re-elected in 1908. Re-elected in 1910. Re-elected in 1912. Re-elected in 1914. Re-elected in 1916. Died.	
Vacant	October 5, 1918 – November 5, 1918	65th			
Carville Dickinson Benson (Halethorpe)	November 5, 1918 – March 3, 1921	65th 66th	Democratic	Elected to finish Talbott's term. Re-elected in 1918. [data missing]	
Albert Alexander Blakeney (Baltimore)	March 4, 1921 – March 3, 1923	67th	Republican	Elected in 1920. [data missing]	
Millard Evelyn Tydings (Havre de Grace)	March 4, 1923 – March 3, 1927	68th 69th	Democratic	Elected in 1922. Re-elected in 1924. [data missing]	
William Purington Cole Jr. (Towson)	March 4, 1927 – March 3, 1929	70th	Democratic	Elected in 1926. [data missing]	
Linwood Leon Clark (Baltimore)	March 4, 1929 – March 3, 1931	71st	Republican	Elected in 1928. [data missing]	
William Purington Cole Jr. (Towson)	March 4, 1931 – October 26, 1942	72nd 73rd 74th 75th 76th 77th	Democratic	Elected in 1930. Re-elected in 1932. Re-elected in 1934. Re-elected in 1936. Re-elected in 1938. Re-elected in 1940. Resigned to become judge of US Customs Court.	
Vacant	October 26, 1942 – January 3, 1943	77th			
Harry Streett Baldwin (Hydes)	January 3, 1943 – January 3, 1947	78th 79th	Democratic	Elected in 1942. Re-elected in 1944. [data missing]	
Hugh Allen Meade (Baltimore)	January 3, 1947 – January 3, 1949	80th	Democratic	Elected in 1946. [data missing]	
William P. Bolton (Towson)	January 3, 1949 – January 3, 1951	81st	Democratic	Elected in 1948. [data missing]	
James Patrick Sinnott Devereux (Stevenson)	January 3, 1951 – January 3, 1959	82nd 83rd 84th 85th	Republican	Elected in 1950. Re-elected in 1952. Re-elected in 1954. Re-elected in 1956. [data missing]	
Daniel Baugh Brewster (Glyndon)	January 3, 1959 – January 3, 1963	86th 87th	Democratic	Elected in 1958. Re-elected in 1960. [data missing]	
Clarence Dickinson Long (Ruxton)	January 3, 1963 – January 3, 1985	88th 89th 90th 91st 92nd 93rd 94th 95th 96th 97th 98th	Democratic	Elected in 1962. Re-elected in 1964. Re-elected in 1966. Re-elected in 1968. Re-elected in 1970. Re-elected in 1972. Re-elected in 1974. Re-elected in 1976. Re-elected in 1978. Re-elected in 1980. Re-elected in 1982. [data missing]	
Helen Delich Bentley (Lutherville)	January 3, 1985 – January 3, 1995	99th 100th 101st 102nd 103rd	Republican	Elected in 1984. Re-elected in 1986. Re-elected in 1988. Re-elected in 1990. Re-elected in 1992. Retired to run for Governor of Maryland.	
Bob Ehrlich (Timonium)	January 3, 1995 – January 3, 2003	104th 105th 106th 107th	Republican	Elected in 1994. Re-elected in 1996. Re-elected in 1998. Re-elected in 2000. Retired to run for Governor of Maryland.	
Dutch Ruppersberger (Cockeysville)	January 3, 2003 – January 3, 2025	108th 109th 110th 111th 112th 113th 114th 115th 116th 117th 118th	Democratic	Elected in 2002. Re-elected in 2004. Re-elected in 2006. Re-elected in 2008. Re-elected in 2010. Re-elected in 2012. Re-elected in 2014. Re-elected in 2016. Re-elected in 2018. Re-elected in 2020. Re-elected in 2022. Retired.	2003–2013
Dutch Ruppersberger (Cockeysville)	January 3, 2003 – January 3, 2025	108th 109th 110th 111th 112th 113th 114th 115th 116th 117th 118th	Democratic	Elected in 2002. Re-elected in 2004. Re-elected in 2006. Re-elected in 2008. Re-elected in 2010. Re-elected in 2012. Re-elected in 2014. Re-elected in 2016. Re-elected in 2018. Re-elected in 2020. Re-elected in 2022. Retired.	2013–2023
Dutch Ruppersberger (Cockeysville)	January 3, 2003 – January 3, 2025	108th 109th 110th 111th 112th 113th 114th 115th 116th 117th 118th	Democratic	Elected in 2002. Re-elected in 2004. Re-elected in 2006. Re-elected in 2008. Re-elected in 2010. Re-elected in 2012. Re-elected in 2014. Re-elected in 2016. Re-elected in 2018. Re-elected in 2020. Re-elected in 2022. Retired.	2023–present
Johnny Olszewski (Sparrows Point)	January 3, 2025– present	119th	Democratic	Elected in 2024. Re-elected in 2026.	2023–present

== See also ==
- Maryland's congressional districts
- List of United States congressional districts
