= 1826 Virginia's 5th congressional district special election =

A special election was held in Virginia's 5th congressional district on January 21, 1826, to fill a vacancy caused by the resignation of John Randolph (J) on December 26, 1825, after being elected to the Senate.

== Election results ==
Candidate	Party	Votes	Percent
George W. Crump	Jacksonian	418	51.9%
William B. Giles	None	388	48.1%

Crump took his seat on February 6, 1826

== See also ==
- List of special elections to the United States House of Representatives
