= 1826 Maryland's 2nd congressional district special election =

A special election was held in Maryland's 2nd congressional district on February 1, 1826, to fill a vacancy caused by the resignation of Joseph Kent (A), who had been elected Governor of Maryland.

== Election results ==
Candidate	Party	Votes	Percent
John C. Weems	Jacksonian	1,139	57.9%
William Woottan	Unknown	827	42.1%

Weems took his seat on February 7, 1826.

== See also ==
- List of special elections to the United States House of Representatives
