= 1827 Georgia's 1st congressional district special election =

A special election was held in Georgia's 1st congressional district on October 1, 1827 to fill a vacancy left by the resignation of Edward F. Tattnall (J) prior to the start of the 20th Congress.

== Background ==
From 1792 until 1824, Georgia had elected its representatives at-large. In 1826, Georgia switched, for that election only, to using districts. In the new 1st district, Edward F. Tattnall (J) was re-elected to a 4th term, but resigned before the start of the 20th Congress.

== Election results ==
Candidate	Party	Votes	Percent
George R. Gilmer	Jacksonian	21,008	63.5%
Thomas U. Charlton	Unknown	12,094	36.5%

== See also ==
- List of special elections to the United States House of Representatives
