= 1827 Georgia's 2nd congressional district special election =

A special election was held in Georgia's 2nd congressional district in 1827 to fill a vacancy caused by the resignation of John Forsyth (J).

== Background ==
From 1792 to 1824, Georgia had elected its representatives at-large. In 1826, for that election only, Georgia switched to using districts. In the new 2nd district, John Forsyth was re-elected to a 3rd term. Some time after the election, Forsyth resigned, having been elected Governor, and a special election was held for his replacement.

== Election results ==
Candidate	Party	Votes	Percent
Richard Henry Wilde	Jacksonian	4,028	90.8%
Others		410	9.2%

Wilde took his seat on January 14, 1828

== See also ==
- List of special elections to the United States House of Representatives
