= 1827 Maine's 1st congressional district special election =

A special election was held in Maine's 1st congressional district on September 27, 1827 to fill a vacancy left by the death of William Burleigh (A) on July 2, 1827

== Election results ==
Candidate	Party	Votes	Percent
Rufus McIntire	Jacksonian	2,174	52.9%
John Holmes	Adams	1,932	47.1%

McIntire took his seat December 3, 1827. Holmes was subsequently elected to the Senate, taking his seat January 26, 1829

== See also ==
- List of special elections to the United States House of Representatives
