= George William Crump =

American politician (1786–1848)

Member of the Virginia House of Delegates from Cumberland County
- In office 1827; Alongside Daniel Wilson
- In office 1817 – 1821; Alongside Allen Wilson, John White

Member of the U.S. House of Representatives from Virginia's 5th district
- In office January 21, 1826 – March 4, 1827
- Preceded by: John Randolph
- Succeeded by: John Randolph

Personal details
- Born: September 26, 1786 Powhatan County, Virginia
- Died: October 1, 1848 (aged 62) Powhatan County, Virginia
- Resting place: "Log Castle," Chesterfield County, Virginia
- Party: Jacksonian
- Education: Washington College; College of William & Mary; Princeton College; University of Pennsylvania
- Profession: doctor, civil servant

George William Crump (September 26, 1786 – October 1, 1848) was a member of the United States House of Representatives in the 19th United States Congress and the U.S. Ambassador to Chile.

== Biography ==
Crump was born in Powhatan County, Virginia. Crump attended then Washington College (now Washington and Lee University) from sometime around 1800 to 1804. According to legend, in August heading into his senior year, Crump was arrested by the authorities of Lexington, Virginia, for running naked through the town, the United States' first recorded incident of streaking. Crump was suspended for the first semester of the 1804–05 academic year.

He went on following Washington College to also graduate from Princeton College in 1805, from the College of William & Mary in 1806, and he also studied medicine at the University of Pennsylvania in Philadelphia from 1806 to 1808.

Crump served in the Virginia House of Delegates. Crump would later serve as member of the Nineteenth Congress of the United States as a Jacksonian Democrat, filling a vacancy caused by the resignation of John Randolph. He served from January 21, 1826, to March 3, 1827.

He was unsuccessful in his bid for reelection in 1826 election to the 20th United States Congress and left public life for a time. He was later appointed by President Andrew Jackson as chief clerk of the Pension Bureau in 1832.

He died on October 1, 1848, in Powhatan County, Virginia, and is interred on his home's grounds at "Log Castle" on Swift Creek, Chesterfield County, near Colonial House, Virginia.

U.S. House of Representatives
Preceded by John Randolph	Member of the U.S. House of Representatives from Virginia's 5th congressional district 1826–1827	Succeeded by John Randolph
