= 1826 North Carolina's 8th congressional district special election =

A special election was held in North Carolina's 8th congressional district on November 3, 1826, to fill a vacancy caused by the resignation of Willie P. Mangum (J) on March 18, 1826

== Election results ==
Candidate	Party	Votes	Percent
Daniel L. Barringer	Jacksonian	1,275	50.4%
James Mebane	Democratic-Republican	1,254	49.6%

Barringer took his seat December 4, 1826

== See also ==
- List of special elections to the United States House of Representatives
