= 1827 Delaware's at-large congressional district special election =

1827 United States House of Representatives special election in Delaware's at-large district
- October 2, 1827
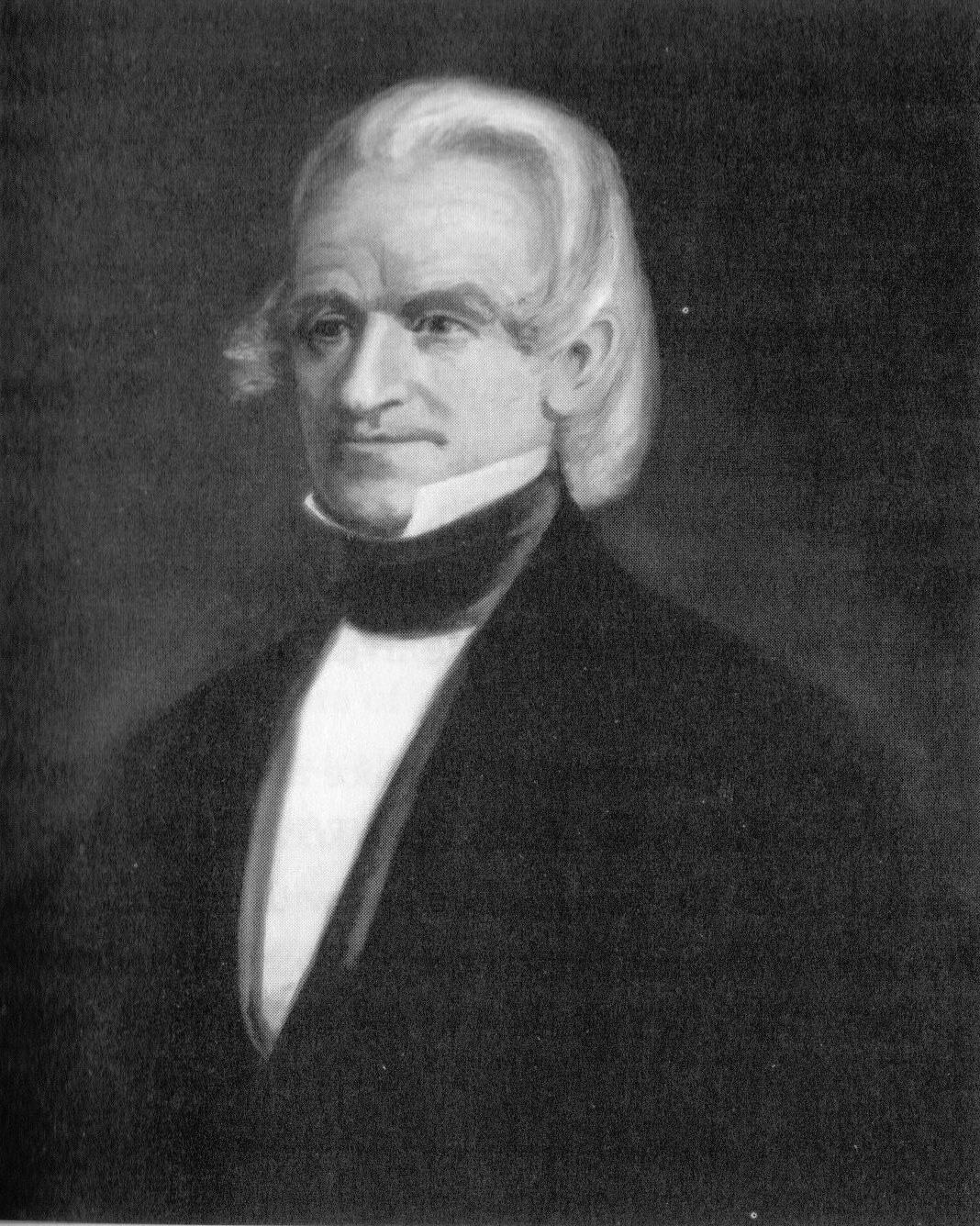

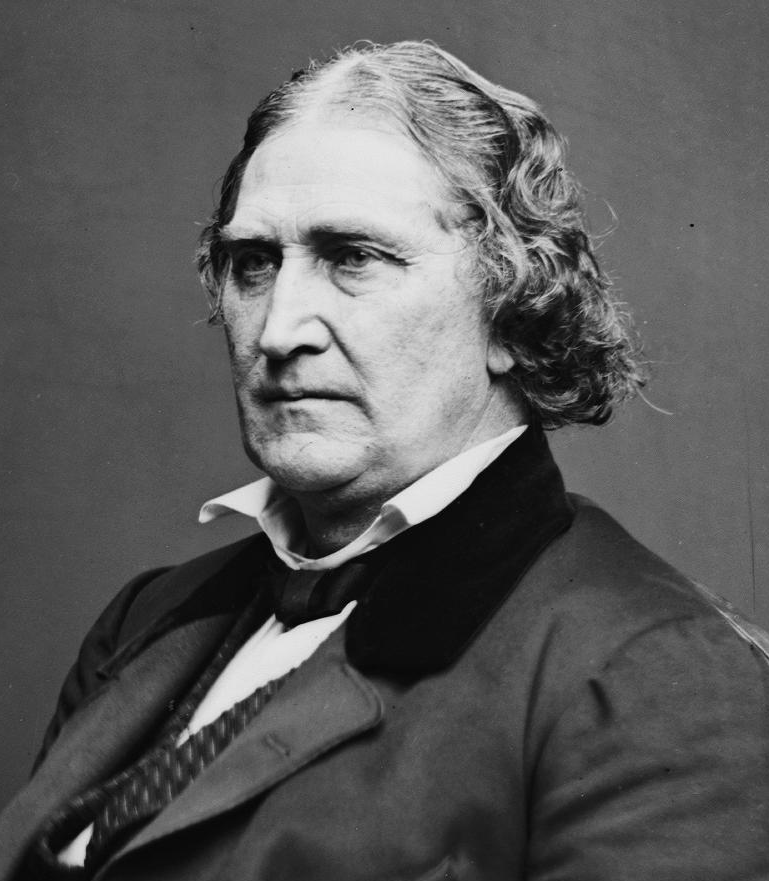
Candidate	Kensey Johns, Jr.	James A. Bayard Jr.
Party	Anti-Jacksonian	Jacksonian
Popular vote	4,148	3,753
Percentage	52.4%	47.4%
- County results Johns: 50–60% Bayard: 50–60%
U.S. Representative before election
Louis McLane
Jacksonian
Elected U.S. Representative
Kensey Johns, Jr.
Anti-Jacksonian

A special election was held October 2, 1827 in Delaware's at-large congressional district to fill a vacancy caused by the resignation of Louis McLane (J) before the start of Congress, after being elected to the Senate.

== Election results ==
1827 Delaware's at-large congressional district election
Party	Candidate	Votes	%
Anti-Jacksonian	Kensey Johns, Jr.	4,148	52.4
Jacksonian	James A. Bayard Jr.	3,753	47.4
	Scattering	10	0.1
Total votes		310,913	100.0
Anti-Jacksonian gain from Jacksonian			

Johns took his seat on December 3, 1827.

== See also ==
- List of special elections to the United States House of Representatives
