= 1826 Maine's 5th congressional district special election =

A special election was held in Maine's 5th congressional district was held on September 11, 1826, to fill a vacancy caused by the resignation of Enoch Lincoln (A) in January, having been elected Governor of Maine. As a majority was not achieved on the first ballot, a second election was held November 27.

== Election results ==
Candidate	Party	First ballot		Second ballot	
Candidate	Party	Votes	Percent	Votes	Percent
James W. Ripley	Jacksonian	1,563	49.8%	623	54.1%
Samuel A. Bradley	Unknown	448	14.3%	407	35.3%
Levi Whitman	Jacksonian	1,055	33.6%		
Oliver Herrick	Unknown			112	9.7%
Scattering		76	2.4%	10	0.9%

Ripley took his seat December 4, 1826. With his election, the 5th district changed from Adams Party control to Jacksonian control.

== See also ==
- List of special elections to the United States House of Representatives
