= 1826 Pennsylvania's 18th congressional district special election =

On January 12, 1826, Patrick Farrelly (J) of Pennsylvania's 18th district died in office. A special election was held to fill the resulting vacancy

== Election results ==
Candidate	Party	Votes	Percent
Thomas H. Sill	Anti-Jacksonian	1,812	39.8%
Stephen Barlow	Jacksonian	1,045	22.9%
Samuel Hayes		937	20.6%
Jacob Herrington		760	16.7%

Sill took his seat April 3, 1826, during the First Session.

== See also ==
- List of special elections to the United States House of Representatives
