= Jedediah Herrick =

- Born: January 9, 1780
- Died: October 10, 1849 (aged 69); Hampden, Maine, U.S.
- Occupation: Military officer

Jedediah Herrick (January 9, 1780 – October 10, 1849) was a general of the Massachusetts militia from 1816 to 1828, after distinguishing himself during the War of 1812. He had earlier served as high sheriff of Maine in 1806, before that territory had yet gained state status.

Herrick rose to the rank of major during the War of 1812. He was appointed to a committee to build a jail in Bangor in the 1817. He published a history of the Herrick family in 1846, which was republished and expanded by another Herrick descendant in 1885. He died in 1849, in Hampden, Maine, at the age of 69. The Farnsworth Art Museum in Maine holds a portrait of Herrick, painted by Amasa Hewins.
