= 1827 Massachusetts's 1st congressional district special election =

A special election was held in Massachusetts's 1st congressional district on July 23, 1827 to fill a vacancy caused by the resignation of Daniel Webster (A) on May 30, 1827 after being elected to the Senate.

== Election results ==
Candidate	Party	Votes	Percent
Benjamin Gorham	Anti-Jacksonian	1,659	58.9%
George Blake	Anti-Jacksonian	698	24.8%
David Henshaw	Jacksonian	459	16.3%

Gorham took his seat on December 3, 1827.

== See also ==
- List of special elections to the United States House of Representatives
