= John Crompton Weems =

American politician

John Crompton Weems (August 11, 1777 – January 20, 1862) was an American politician.

Born in 1777 in Calvert County, Maryland, Weems attended St. John's College of Annapolis, Maryland, and engaged in planting. He was elected to the Nineteenth Congress to fill the vacancy caused by the resignation of Joseph Kent, was reelected to the Twentieth Congress, and served from February 1, 1826, to March 3, 1829. He is remembered for a speech defending the interstate slave trade. He resumed agricultural pursuits afterwards, and died on his plantation, "Loch Eden", in Anne Arundel County, Maryland. He is interred in a private cemetery on his estate.

U.S. House of Representatives
Preceded by Joseph Kent	Member of the U.S. House of Representatives from Maryland's 2nd congressional district 1826–1829	Succeeded by Benedict Joseph Semmes
