= James Johnson (Kentucky politician) =

American politician

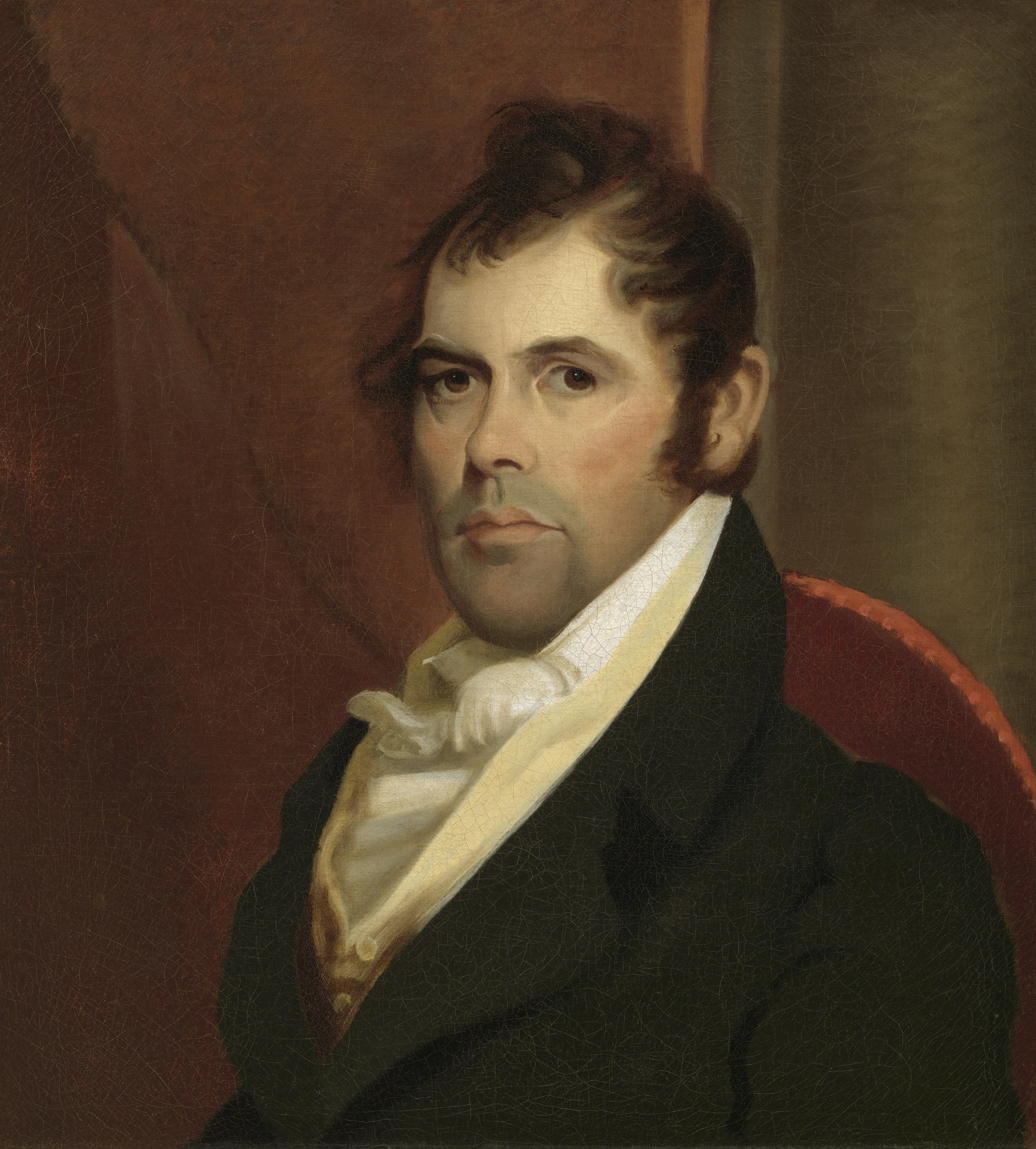
- Portrait by Matthew Harris Jouett c. 1818

Member of the U.S. House of Representatives from Kentucky's 5th district
- In office March 4, 1825 – August 13, 1826
- Preceded by: John Telemachus Johnson
- Succeeded by: Robert L. McHatton

Personal details
- Born: January 1, 1774 Orange County, Virginia Colony, British America
- Died: August 13, 1826 (aged 52) Washington, D.C., U.S.
- Party: Democratic
- Relatives: Richard Mentor Johnson (brother); John Telemachus Johnson (brother); Robert Ward Johnson (nephew)

Military service
- Rank: Lieutenant colonel
- Battles/wars: War of 1812

James Johnson (January 1, 1774 – August 13, 1826) was a U.S. representative from Kentucky, brother of Richard Mentor Johnson and John Telemachus Johnson and uncle of Robert Ward Johnson.

Born in Orange County in the Virginia Colony, Johnson moved with his father to Kentucky in 1779. He pursued preparatory studies. He was a member of the State senate in 1808. He served as lieutenant colonel in the War of 1812 and fought alongside his brother Richard at the Battle of the Thames.

He was a contractor for furnishing supplies to troops on the western frontier in 1819 and 1820. (See: Yellowstone expedition) He served as presidential elector on the ticket of Monroe and Tompkins in 1820.

Johnson was elected as a Jacksonian to the Nineteenth Congress and served from March 4, 1825, until his death in Washington, D.C., August 13, 1826. He was interred in the family cemetery, Great Crossings, Kentucky.

== See also ==
- The Family (Arkansas politics)
- List of members of the United States Congress who died in office (1790–1899)

U.S. House of Representatives
| Preceded by John T. Johnson | Member of the U.S. House of Representatives from Kentucky's 5th congressional district 1825–1826 | Succeeded by Robert L. McHatton |
