= David Jennings (Ohio politician) =

American politician

Member of the U.S. House of Representatives from Ohio's 10th district
- In office March 4, 1825 – May 25, 1826
- Preceded by: John Patterson
- Succeeded by: Thomas Shannon

Member of the Ohio Senate
- In office 1819–1824

Personal details
- Born: 1787 Readington Township, New Jersey
- Died: 1834 (aged 46–47) Baltimore, Maryland, U.S.
- Party: Adams

David Jennings (1787–1834) was a 19th-century American lawyer and politician who was a United States representative from Ohio for part of one term from 1825 to 1826.

== Biography ==
Born in Readington Township, New Jersey, Jennings attended the public schools. He moved to St. Clairsville, Ohio, in 1812.

He studied law, was admitted to the bar in 1813, and commenced practice in St. Clairsville. Jennings held several local offices, and served as prosecuting attorney of Belmont County from 1815 to 1825.

=== Political career ===
He served as member of the State senate from 1819 to 1824.

Jennings was elected as a pro-Adams Republican to the Nineteenth Congress and served from March 4, 1825, until his resignation on May 25, 1826.

=== Death ===
He died in Baltimore, Maryland, in 1834.

Ohio Senate
Preceded by John Patterson	Senator from Belmont and Monroe Counties; 1819–1825	District eliminated
