= John Patterson (Ohio congressman) =

American politician (1771–1848)

Member of the U.S. House of Representatives from Ohio's 10th district
- In office March 4, 1823 – March 4, 1825
- Preceded by: new district
- Succeeded by: David Jennings

Member of the Ohio Senate from Belmont County
- In office 1815–1819
- Preceded by: Charles Hammond
- Succeeded by: David Jennings

Member of the Ohio House of Representatives from Belmont County
- In office 1807–1808
- Preceded by: Josiah Dillon; John Stewart
- Succeeded by: Edward Bryson; Joseph Sharp; Isaac Vore

Personal details
- Born: John Patterson; February 10, 1771 Little Britain Township, Province of Pennsylvania, British America
- Died: February 7, 1848 (aged 76) St. Clairsville, Ohio, U.S
- Resting place: Union Cemetery
- Party: Democratic-Republican

John Patterson (February 10, 1771 – February 7, 1848) was an American politician who served as a member of the U.S. House of Representatives from Ohio for one term from 1823 to 1825.

== Biography ==
John Patterson (half brother of Pennsylvania congressman Thomas Patterson) was born in Little Britain Township in the Province of Pennsylvania. He moved with his parents to Pattersons Mills, Pennsylvania, Cross Creek Township, Pennsylvania, in 1778. He attended the common schools, and moved to St. Clairsville, Ohio.

=== Early career ===
He engaged in mercantile pursuits and served as the first mayor of St. Clairsville in 1807 and 1808.

He was a member of the Ohio House of Representatives in 1807 and 1808. He served in the Ohio State Senate from 1815 to 1818. He was associate judge of the court of common pleas of Belmont County, Ohio, from February 1810 to February 1815. Ohio Presidential elector in 1816 for James Monroe.

=== Congress ===
He was elected as an Adams-Clay Republican to the Eighteenth Congress.

=== Later career ===
He was engaged in the hardware business and in agricultural pursuits.

=== Death ===
He died in St. Clairsville in 1848. Interment in Union Cemetery.

== Sources ==
- United States Congress. "John Patterson (id: P000122)". Biographical Directory of the United States Congress.
- The Political Graveyard

Ohio House of Representatives
Preceded by Josiah Dillon; John Stewart	Representative from Belmont County; 1807–1808; Served alongside: William Vance	Succeeded by Edward Bryson; Joseph Sharp; Isaac Vore
Ohio Senate
Preceded by Charles Hammond	Senator from Belmont County; 1815–1819	Succeeded by David Jennings
U.S. House of Representatives
New district	Representative from Ohio's 10th congressional district March 4, 1823 – March 3, 1825	Succeeded by David Jennings
