= Robert L. McHatton =

American politician

Robert Lytle Mchatton

Member of the U.S. House of Representatives from Kentucky's 5th district
- In office December 7, 1826 – March 3, 1829
- Preceded by: James Johnson
- Succeeded by: Richard M. Johnson

Personal details
- Born: November 17, 1788 Fayette County, Virginia (now Kentucky)
- Died: May 20, 1835 (aged 46) Marion County, Indiana, U.S.

Robert Lytle Mchatton (November 17, 1788 – May 20, 1835) was a U.S. representative from Kentucky.

Born in Fayette County, Virginia (now Kentucky), Mchatton attended the common schools. He engaged in agricultural pursuits. He owned slaves. He served as a member of the State house of representatives 1814–1816. He served as major of the Seventy-seventh Regiment of state militia in 1816.

Mchatton was elected as a Jacksonian to the Nineteenth Congress to fill the vacancy caused by the death of James Johnson. He was reelected as a Jacksonian to the Twentieth Congress and served from December 7, 1826, to March 3, 1829. He resumed agricultural pursuits. He died in Marion County, Indiana, May 20, 1835. He was interred in the Old Cemetery, Georgetown, Kentucky.

U.S. House of Representatives
Preceded by James Johnson	Member of the U.S. House of Representatives from Kentucky's 5th congressional district 1826–1829	Succeeded by Richard M. Johnson
