= William Brown (Kentucky politician) =

American politician

Member of the U.S. House of Representatives from Kentucky's 3rd district
- In office March 4, 1819 – March 3, 1821
- Preceded by: Richard M. Johnson
- Succeeded by: John T. Johnson

Personal details
- Born: April 19, 1779 Frederick County, Virginia, U.S.
- Died: October 6, 1833 (aged 54) Jacksonville, Illinois, U.S.
- Party: Democratic-Republican
- Profession: Politician

William Brown (April 19, 1779 – October 6, 1833) was a U.S. representative from Kentucky.

Born in Frederick County, Virginia, Brown attended the common schools. He moved with his father to Bourbon County, Kentucky, in 1784 and to Cynthiana, Kentucky, about 1795. Brown studied law and was admitted to the bar. He served as a colonel in the War of 1812.

Brown was elected as the Democratic-Republican to the Sixteenth Congress (March 4, 1819 – March 3, 1821) for Kentucky's 3rd congressional district. He moved to Jacksonville, Illinois, in 1832, where he died October 6, 1833.

U.S. House of Representatives
Preceded by Richard M. Johnson	Member of the U.S. House of Representatives from Kentucky's 3rd congressional district 1819–1821	Succeeded by John T. Johnson
