= Troup party =

Early American political party in Georgia

Troup party Crawford party Jackson party
- Leader: James Jackson; John Milledge; David Brydie Mitchell; William H. Crawford; George Troup
- Founder: James Jackson
- Founded: c. 1780s
- Dissolved: November 13, 1833
- Succeeded by: Whig: State Rights Party
- National affiliation: Federalist; Anti-Administration Party; Democratic-Republican: Tertium quids; Jacksonian

The Troup party, (Note: Sources conflict on whether to capitalize party or even use party and not faction. Coleman, Murray, Phillips do not capitalize party Foster and the New Georgia Encyclopedia do capitalize party. Sullivan only uses faction) earlier called the Jackson and Crawford parties after its leaders, was a political faction in the state of Georgia aligning itself with the radicals of the Democratic-Republican Party and later the Jacksonians. Founded by James Jackson, the faction consisted of Virginian immigrants, aristocratic plantation owners, residents of the more prosperous and populated areas of the state. The faction opposed the local Federalist Party and the Clark party—a rival faction of Republicans led by John Clark.

During the Nullification Crisis, the factions fractured into nullifier and union (or anti-nullification) men. In the aftermath of the 1833 elections, Troup party leaders joined the Troup members of the General Assembly in a caucus, passing resolutions changing the name of the party to the State Rights Party of Georgia, adopting the Kentucky and Virginia Resolutions as its official creed, and pledging to work for the repeal of the Force Bill. David Mitchell became the party's chairman. Clark Nullifiers joined the party and Troup Union men left for the Union Democratic Republican Party.

== History ==
=== Jackson ===
In early Georgian politics, political divisions in the state fell along the lines of personal support for outstanding leaders in their struggle for power. Many of these factions were usually held together through personal friendships and family associations. As one of these factions, the Jackson party started off as a political base for James Jackson, centered in Coastal Georgia in the 1780s. Jackson, a member of the General Assembly and maintaining duties in the militia, used these roles to establish ties with several talented and ambitious upcountry politicians, quickly rising to prominence in Georgian politics. He was eventually elected as a representative to the 1st United States Congress, governor, and a senator to the 3rd United States Congress.

In 1794, politicians, including the state's leading Federalist, orchestrated the Yazoo land fraud, bribing legislatures to sell large swaths of land to four companies. In response to the news of these sales, Jackson resigned from his Senate seat, returned to the state, and was elected to the General Assembly in 1795, to personally organize an anti-Yazoo campaign. Under his leadership, the legislature repealed the Yazoo Act and arranged for public destruction of documents tied to the sales. Taking advantage of his triumph over the Yazooists, Jackson was able to establish his supremacy in Georgia politics. He and his faction expanded their influence statewide, founding newspapers in major cities and skillfully using political appointments to grow what had initially been a coastal faction.

Appealing to both aristocrats and the common folk through his bombastic personality and his leadership abilities, Jackson built a political machine, which effectively monopolized public office for the Republicans. The remaining opposition primarily consisted of a weakened Federalist, former Yazooist, and ambitious men—many of whose families had migrated to Georgia from North Carolina—in the upcountry.

Over time, the Jacksonian coalition's dominance weakened it. The lack of a substantial threat led to complacency and a fragmented party organization. The opposition to Jackson eventually rallied around John Clark, a fellow Republican "who was cast in the mold of deferential politics, unhampered by ideology, and unwilling to play second fiddle to anyone, even James Jackson." Clark was also tainted by the fraud, having procured shares in at least two of the Yazoo companies. However, according to one member of the Clark faction, Clark had always been opposed to the fraud, believing he had been unjustly defrauded. Clark's connections allowed him to challenge the influence of Jackson's machine in the upcountry.

=== Crawford ===
Following Jackson's death in 1806, his machine passed into the hands of his former lieutenants: the old guard, John Milledge and David Brydie Mitchell; William H. Crawford, a young and prominent Republican from the upcountry; and George Troup, who was popular in the lowcountry. Although Jackson had picked Crawford and Troup as his successors, their frequent absences from the state in federal politics left Mitchell as the de facto leader of the faction, which came to be known as the "Crawford party."

Mitchell fought defensively against the statewide expansion of the Clarkites, even as many of the Crawford party's supporters, for various reasons, left for Alabama, Mississippi, and Florida. The state became divided between the two Republican factions. Even so, according to historian Kenneth Coleman, state politics had not yet become strongly partisan.

There was a consensus among Georgia Republicans on opposing the settling of the Yazoo land claims and later supporting the War of 1812. Divisions emerged over other issues such as the Alleviating Act in 1808, passed in response to the economic fallout from the Embargo Act. This legislation aimed to ease financial pressures on planters burdened by debt from economic sanctions placed on Britain and France. While the faction backed the act through 1813, creditors strongly opposed it. In 1814, Governor Peter Early, who had previously approved the 1813 measure, vetoed its follow-up legislation, which led him to be denied a second term. Following this, many members of the Crawford party were ousted from office.

Another setback came in 1816 with the passage of the Compensation Act. This law replaced the flat annual salary for members of Congress with a per diem payment system, sparking public outrage over what many considered a "salary grab." The backlash resulted in the defeat of Senator William Bibb and the loss of seats for most of Georgia's congressional delegation. By 1816, the Crawford party was in sharp decline.

In the aftermath of the War of 1812, Mitchell resigned as Governor to serve as American agent to the Creeks, just as the Clark party emerged as Georgia's dominant Republican faction. The collapse of the party was only halted, and even reversed, by the leadership of the fiery George Troup, who returned from Congress to take charge of the party. Troup faced Clark in 1819 but lost the legislature vote.

As governor, Clark pursued allegations against Mitchell, who became involved in a slave-smuggling scheme that violated the 1808 law banning the American slave trade. Clark publicized the results and, bolstered by the political alliance he had established with Jackson, got the Monroe administration to investigate and remove Mitchell from office in 1821.

Troup ran against Clark again in 1821 but lost the legislature vote. In 1823, Troup defeated Clark's lieutenant, Matthew Talbot, in the legislature vote. That same year, the Clark party began pushing for reforms to establish the popular election of governors and presidential electors. The legislature passed the measure for gubernatorial elections. While the Clarkites claimed credit for this shift toward a more democratic process, Troup and his supporters embraced the change, using it as an opportunity to reject accusations that their faction represented "the aristocracy." For presidential elections, the Crawford party-controlled legislature opted for a referendum on the issue after 1824, killing the Clark bill that would've adopted the popular vote for that presidential election.

In the 1824 presidential election, the faction backed its namesake, while the Clarkites aligned with Jackson. Since the legislature was controlled by the Crawfordites, Georgia awarded all its electoral votes to Crawford and elected two Crawfordites to the Senate. Crawford would go on to place third in both the election and contingency election. By then, if not earlier, according to historian George R. Lamplugh, the "Crawford party" had become the "Troup party", as Troup skillfully reframed familiar political debates with the increasingly fervent rhetoric of states' rights. Additionally, the Troup party, which had a negative view of Adams, began gravitating toward Jackson's camp. They sought to position themselves as Jackson's true allies, even claiming that they were the party of Jackson. In 1826, the legislature 101–9 recommended him for 1828.

=== Troup ===
Results by county: Troup: 50–60%; 60–70%; 70–80%; 80–90%; >90%; Clark: 50–60%; 60–70%; 70–80%; 80–90%; Tie Creek and Cherokee territory

In 1825 gubernatorial election, the more "aristocratic" Troup narrowly defeated the supposedly more "democratic" Clark. Troup's victory was bolstered by his rapidly evolving state rights stance, particularly in his squabbles with the federal government over the recently signed Treaty of Indian Springs.

In 1826, Clarkites suffered more defeats when Clark failed to secure a seat in the state senate, Troupers gained a majority in the legislature, and in the congressional elections that year, five out of seven House seats went to Troupers. The 1827 gubernatorial election further cemented Trouper dominance. The Troup faction nominated John Forsyth, while the Clarkites initially selected Duncan Campbell, a negotiator of the Treaty of Indian Springs—a treaty they had criticized and abandoned for the Treaty of Washington. Campbell withdrew due to family health issues and required absences from the state, leading the Clarkites to nominate Mathew Talbot. Talbot died in the middle of the campaign and Forsyth won an easy victory against a scattered opposition.

Following these defeats, coupled with Clark's departure from Georgia to serve as a federal Indian agent and "Keeper of the Public Forests" in Florida, the Clark party entered a period of decline. It was proposed that the Clark party change its name to the Union party, a suggestion that was informally approved by the rank and tile of Clarke's former colleagues, and the name of the old champion gradually lost its usage.

The Tariff of Abominations shifted politics more national. Many, including the governor, opposed the tariff, viewing it as unconstitutional. Others, including the party sheets, also opposed the tariff, but instead suggested diversifying and becoming less dependent on Northern manufacturing. To do this, some suggested a tariff on the pro-tariff states or stop imports from them altogether. The Clarkites also opposed the tariffs but cautioned against the extreme reactions displayed at anti-tariff meetings as they did not want to threaten the union. After 1828, agitation against the tariff subsided somewhat in Georgia, and the 1829 legislature contented itself with directing Georgia’s congressional delegation to work toward repealing the act.

In the 1828 presidential election, both parties supported Jackson but, to attract voters to their specifically their slate, the faction nominated Jackson with Crawford, while the Clarkites kept Jackson with Calhoun. While the Troup slate won, two of them cast their vote for, with the other seven votes throwing away their votes for William Smith. Jackson named Trouper John Berrien as his Attorney-General as patronage for a party that only supported him "as an alternative," instead of the "old and uniform friends" in the Clark party.

When Jackson signed the Tariff of 1832, Georgia's political landscape began to fragment. While, at least to critics, the state had effectively practised nullification when ignoring the decisions of the Supreme Court on the basis of state' rights, the question of nullification over tariffs tore the state. Some Troupers and Clarkites were drawn to Calhoun's call for nullification, but the parties simply acted as if nothing had ever happened. With Jackson declaring nullification treason in December 1832, the two parties began to disintegrate under the pressure. In the lead up to the 1833 elections, newspapers began appealing to “Troup Union”, “Clark Nullifiers,” “Troup Nullifiers,” and “Clark Union" men. In the gubernatorial election, Union nominee for governor, Lumpkin, won the governorship with the help of defections to the party from "Troup Union" men—who, while they might have agreed with the characterization of Troup as a staunch state rights man, believed that the State Rights Party was dominated by Nullifiers.

In the aftermath of the elections, on evening of November 13, 1833, Troup party leaders joined the Troup members of the General Assembly in a caucus, passing resolutions changing the name of the party to the State Rights Party of Georgia, adopting the Kentucky and Virginia Resolutions as the official creed of the party, and pledging to work for the repeal of the Force Bill. David Mitchell became the party's chairman. Eight days later the Clarkites followed, creating the "Union Democratic Republican Party". Most Troupers, and Nullifer Clarkites, formed the former party, which favored Nullification; most Clarkites, along with Union Troupers formed the latter party, which opposed nullification.

== Ideology ==
During the years when the state was dominated by the rivalry between Tropers (or Crawfordites) and Clarkites, the parties were based around their personalities rather than actual policies. Both factions were extremely similar, supporting slavery, the War of 1812, Indian removal, and opposing protective tariffs, internal improvements, and the national bank. The Troup party were radicals who leaned more towards states' rights while the Clarkites were closer to the Union. Historian Paul Murray described the party as having a "conservative spirit" that made it a "political anomaly" as "its leaders and its organization were typical of politics in the late eighteenth century."

Support for the Troup party typically came from Virginian immigrants, aristocratic plantation owners, and residents of the more prosperous and populated areas of the state. In contrast, the Clark party was rooted in the state's poorer, more frontier areas. These affiliations, however, were not rigid, as historian Kenneth Coleman noted, describing them as "vague tendencies in a fluid, confused, highly partisan political milieu that defied logical explanation." The Troup party also had an appeal to middle and lower-class voters, in that Troup's firm stance on Indian removal appealed to land-hungry Georgians, regardless of socio-economic class.

Observers outside Georgia often struggled to make sense of the state’s political dynamics. One such observer was Hezekiah Niles of the Niles' Weekly Register, who almost annually vent his frustration over party politics in Georgia in the columns of his paper. He did not understand Georgia’s parties emphasized the names of their leaders, not the principles for which they stood, which Niles professed never to grasp. He did not understand why the parties were opposed or why people supported one over the others, besides their personalities.

Troup papers themselves, in 1827, described their faction as a single principled party, in contrast to the Clarkites, whom they characterized as an opportunistic personal faction devoted to John Clark. These papers frequently accused the Clarkites of being secretly Federalists and Yazooists, despite their claim that they had abandoned their former principles and become democrats. The Georgia Journal, for instance, asserted that almost all the leading men of the Clark party were ultra federalists who had successfully concealed this reality from their democratic partisans.

== Electoral history ==
=== Presidential elections ===
In three elections, the faction supported different candidates than its rival.

Election year	Vote percentage	Votes	Ticket
1824	72.89 / 100	121	William H. Crawford/Nathaniel Macon
1828	52.53 / 100	10,508	Andrew Jackson/William H. Crawford
1832	65.33 / 100	13,881	Andrew Jackson/Martin Van Buren

=== Gubernatorial elections ===
Year	Gubernatorial nominee	Votes	%
1825	George Troup	20,550	50.85%
1827	John Forsyth	22,774	70.08%
1829	Troup caucus split at Athens		
1831	George R. Gilmer	25,867	48.65%
1833	Joel Crawford	29,171	48.24%

== Works cited ==
- Murray, Paul (1945). "Party Organization in Georgia Politics 1825–1853". The Georgia Historical Quarterly. 29 (4): 195–210. JSTOR 40576991.
- Lamplugh, George R. (2015). Rancorous Enmities and Blind Partialities: Factions and Parties in Georgia, 1807–1845. ISBN 9780761865872.
- Coleman, Kenneth (1991). A History of Georgia. University of Georgia Press. ISBN 9780820312699.
- Phillips, Ulrich Bonnell (1902). Georgia and state rights: A study of the political history of Georgia from the Revolution to the Civil War, with particular regard to federal relations. Washington, Government Printing Office.
- Sullivan, Buddy (2003). Georgia: A State History. Arcadia. ISBN 9780738524085.
- Foster, William Omer (2009). James Jackson: Duelist and Militant Statesman, 1757–1806. University of Georgia Press. ISBN 9780820334400.
- Coulter, E. Merton (1921). "The Nullification Movement in Georgia". The Georgia Historical Quarterly. 5 (1): 3–39. JSTOR 40575654.
