= 1833 Georgia gubernatorial election =

- October 7, 1833
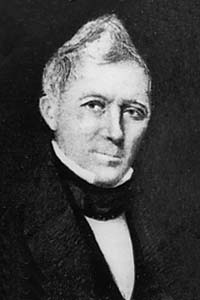
Nominee	Wilson Lumpkin	Joel Crawford
Party	Democratic	National Republican
Alliance	Union Party	Troup party
Popular vote	31,296	29,171
Percentage	51.76%	48.24%
- County results Lumpkin: 50–60% 60–70% 70–80% 80–90% >90% Crawford: 50–60% 60–70% 70–80% 80–90% >90%
Governor before election
Wilson Lumpkin
Democratic
Elected Governor
Wilson Lumpkin
Democratic

The 1833 Georgia gubernatorial election was held on October 7, 1833, to elect the governor of Georgia. Incumbent Democratic Union Governor Wilson Lumpkin narrowly defeated National Republican Troup nominee Joel Crawford

== Background ==
During this time, Georgian politics were dominated by two local parties, the Union party and the Troup party. The Union party was the product of the forces of liberal democracy that brought white manhood suffrage and popular elections in the 1800s. The Troup party, on the other hand, was a political anomaly whose conservative politics and organization were more closely related to those of the late 1800s.

=== Nullification Crisis ===
By this point, the Troup party was only able to hold on to life by reorganizing itself into being more in line with the rising opposition to President Andrew Jackson and becoming increasingly anti-tariff. Some minor leaders in the party even began to support the principle of Nullification.

The Union party instantly used this to their advantage by calling the Troup Nullifiers and associating them with the extremists in South Carolina. John M. Berrien, a leader in the Troup party, was doubtful of the power of Nullification and instead suggested that the state hold a convention like in other southern states concerning the ultimate mode of redress against the unconstitutional tariff law. One had already been called by members of the party.

On November 12, 1832, this anti-tariff convention met at Milledgeville with 125 delegates from 64 counties. After two days of obstructive tactics by the Union minority of 53 delegates, the Union party preserved its integrity by withdrawing from the convention. The convention then proceeded under the leadership of Berrien and passed a resolution denouncing the tariff without making any reference to "King Andrew" or nullification.

Nonetheless, the Union party continued to proclaim the Troup party as nullifiers and in cahoots with the South Carolina extremists. They also denounced the whole convention as a political stunt for the benefit of the Troup party and Berrien, challenging the right of that party to speak for the entire state.

=== Troup Nomination ===
The Troup party attempted to renominate George Troup, the man the party was named after, for governor. Troup had already been governor of Georgia from 1823 to 1827 and had previously refused Troup nomination in the 1827 gubernatorial election. Troup had been vigorous in his opposition to the central government and was even a supporter of Nullification but refused nomination once again.

Instead, former gubernatorial candidate Joel Crawford was unanimously nominated once again. Unlike Troup, Crawford was not a Nullifier. According to Troup papers, he was a defender of State Rights or he only favoured Nullification as a last resort.

=== Union Nomination ===
The Union party renominated Governor Wilson Lunpkin who was not safe from controversy either. Many of his opponents accused him of being inconsistent on the issue of Nullification. Lumpkin was not a Nullifier by the time of his nomination but according to Nullifier A. H. Pemberton of the Augusta Chronicle, Lumpkin shared the same Nullification views as him in a correspondence in 1832

== Election ==
The belief that the Troup party was dominated by Nullifiers cause many Troup supporters, even if they were supporters of state rights, to defect from the party. These people were called the "Troup Union" men and hurt the chances of Joel Crawford.

=== Results ===
1833 Georgia gubernatorial election (Official count) (Note: The vote of 5 counties was excluded in the official count by the Legislature. The official count is also off by a few hundred when tallying up the county returns)
Party	Candidate	Votes	%
Jacksonian	Wilson Lumpkin	30,861	51.9
Anti-Jacksonian	Joel Crawford	28,565	48.1
Total votes		59,426	100

1833 Georgia gubernatorial election (Actual returns)
Party	Candidate	Votes	%
Jacksonian	Wilson Lumpkin	31,296	51.76
Anti-Jacksonian	Joel Crawford	29,171	48.24
Total votes		60,467	100

== Aftermath ==
Following the election the Troup party was reduced to a helpless minority in the legislature. On November 13, the Troup party changed its name to the State Rights party and adopted the Virginia and Kentucky resolutions as their official creed. They also set out to repeal the Force Bill.
