= 1829 Georgia gubernatorial election =

- October 5, 1829
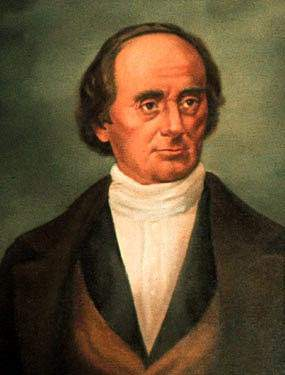
Nominee	George R. Gilmer	Joel Crawford
Party	Jacksonian	Jacksonian
Alliance	Troup party	Troup party
Popular vote	28,850 (Note: Data missing for Ware County)	12,082
Percentage	70.48%	29.52%
- Results by County; Gilmer: 50–60% 60–70% 70–80% 80–90% >90% Crawford: 50–60% 60–70% 70–80% 80–90% Cherokee territory: No Data
Governor before election
John Forsyth
Jacksonian
Elected Governor
George R. Gilmer
Jacksonian

The 1829 Georgia gubernatorial election was held on October 5, 1829, to elect the governor of Georgia. Jacksonian Troup Governor John Forsyth, first elected in the 1827 election, declined to seek re-election to a second term, instead aiming to be elected to the U.S. Senate. Jacksonian Troup candidate George Rockingham Gilmer, U.S House rep for Georgia's 1st congressional district, won in a landslide with the backing of both local parties.

== Background ==
The first political divisions in the state fell along the lines of personal support for outstanding leaders in their struggle for power. Many of these factions were usually held together through personal friendships and family associations. The two factions at the time were the Clark faction, followers of Ex-Governor John Clark, and the Troup faction, followers of Ex-Governor George Troup.

Following the death of its gubernatorial candidate in the 1827 gubernatorial election and the removal of Clark from Georgia to Florida, the Clark party would eventually die out the following year. In its ashes rose the Union party, a product of the forces of liberal democracy that brought white manhood suffrage and popular elections in the 1800s. However, this new party chose not to field a candidate and instead, its leaders decided to support George Rockingham Gilmer for governor.

The Troup party, on the other hand, was a political anomaly whose conservative politics and organization more closely related to those of the late 1800s. In 1828, the Troup caucus split at Athens between supporting Gilmer or Georgia State Senator Joel Crawford.

== Election ==
1829 Georgia gubernatorial election (Official count) (Note: The vote of 14 counties was excluded in the official count by the Legislature)
Party	Candidate	Votes	%
Jacksonian	George R. Gilmer	24,204	69.3
Jacksonian	Joel Crawford	10,718	30.7
Total votes		34,922	100

1829 Georgia gubernatorial election (With the 14 missing counties)
Party	Candidate	Votes	%
Jacksonian	George R. Gilmer	28,850	70.48
Jacksonian	Joel Crawford	12,082	29.52
Total votes		40,932	100

== Aftermath ==
Following Gilmer's victory he supported Union party nominee, John Forsyth, for U.S. senatorship. However, he appointed Troup party members to state offices.
