= 1831 Georgia gubernatorial election =

- October 3, 1831
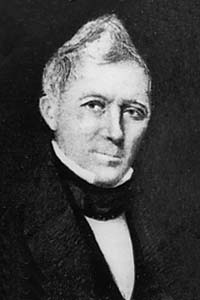

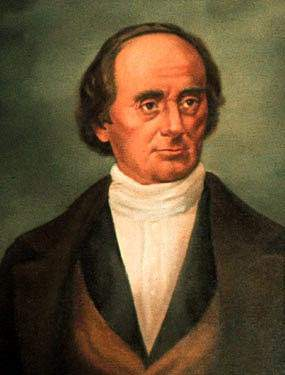
Nominee	Wilson Lumpkin	George R. Gilmer
Party	Jacksonian	Jacksonian
Alliance	Union Party	Troup party
Popular vote	27,305	25,867
Percentage	51.35%	48.65%
- Results by County; Lumpkin: 50–60% 60–70% 70–80% 80–90% Gilmer: 50–60% 60–70% 70–80% 80–90% >90% Cherokee territory
Governor before election
George R. Gilmer
Jacksonian
Elected Governor
Wilson Lumpkin
Jacksonian

The 1831 Georgia gubernatorial election was held on October 3, 1831, to elect the governor of Georgia. Incumbent Jacksonian Troup Governor George Rockingham Gilmer, first elected in the 1829 election, ran for re-election to a second term. He was narrowly defeated by the Jacksonian Union nominee, U.S House Representative Wilson Lumpkin.

== Background ==
During this time, Georgian politics were dominated by two local parties, the Union party and the Troup party. The Union party was the product of the forces of liberal democracy that brought white manhood suffrage and popular elections in the 1800s. The Troup party, on the other hand, was a political anomaly whose conservative politics and organization were more closely related to those of the late 1800s.

=== Union Party ===
Following the previous election in 1829, the Union party grew rapidly with the help of several newspapers such as the Macon Telegraph, the Savannah Mercury, The Argus, The Democrat, The Federal Union, The Augusta Chronicle, and the Mcdonough Jacksonian. Many columnists for these newspapers attacked what they called the "Troup aristocracy".

Another contribution to its growth was the emergence of competent leaders who were fed up with the undemocratic nature of the Troup party and its severe competition in the leadership arena.

U.S House Representative Wilson Lumpkin had the choice of nomination for Governor by either state party caucus but chose the Union party nomination.

=== Troup Party ===
After his election in 1829, Governor George R. Gilmer had been discredited in the eyes of the new democracy by his seeming desertion of his Union supporters that had helped him win the previous election. Another problem for his reputation was his belief that lands containing gold should be withheld from the land lottery.

The Troup party as a whole wasn't safe from controversy either. The party, through much manipulation, had kept the nearly senile William H. Crawford as judge of the Northern Circuit, which brought great discredit to the caucus. Despite these controversies, the party was able to hold on to life by reorganizing itself into being more in line with the rising opposition to President Andrew Jackson and becoming increasingly anti-tariff.

The Troup party renominated Governor Gilmer.

== Election ==
1831 Georgia gubernatorial election
Party	Candidate	Votes	%
Jacksonian	Wilson Lumpkin	27,305	51.35
Jacksonian	George R. Gilmer (incumbent)	25,867	48.65
Total votes		53,172	100

== Aftermath ==
Under the leadership of Wilson Lumpkin, the Union party was able to sweep into power.
