= 1832 United States presidential election in Georgia =

- November 5, 1832
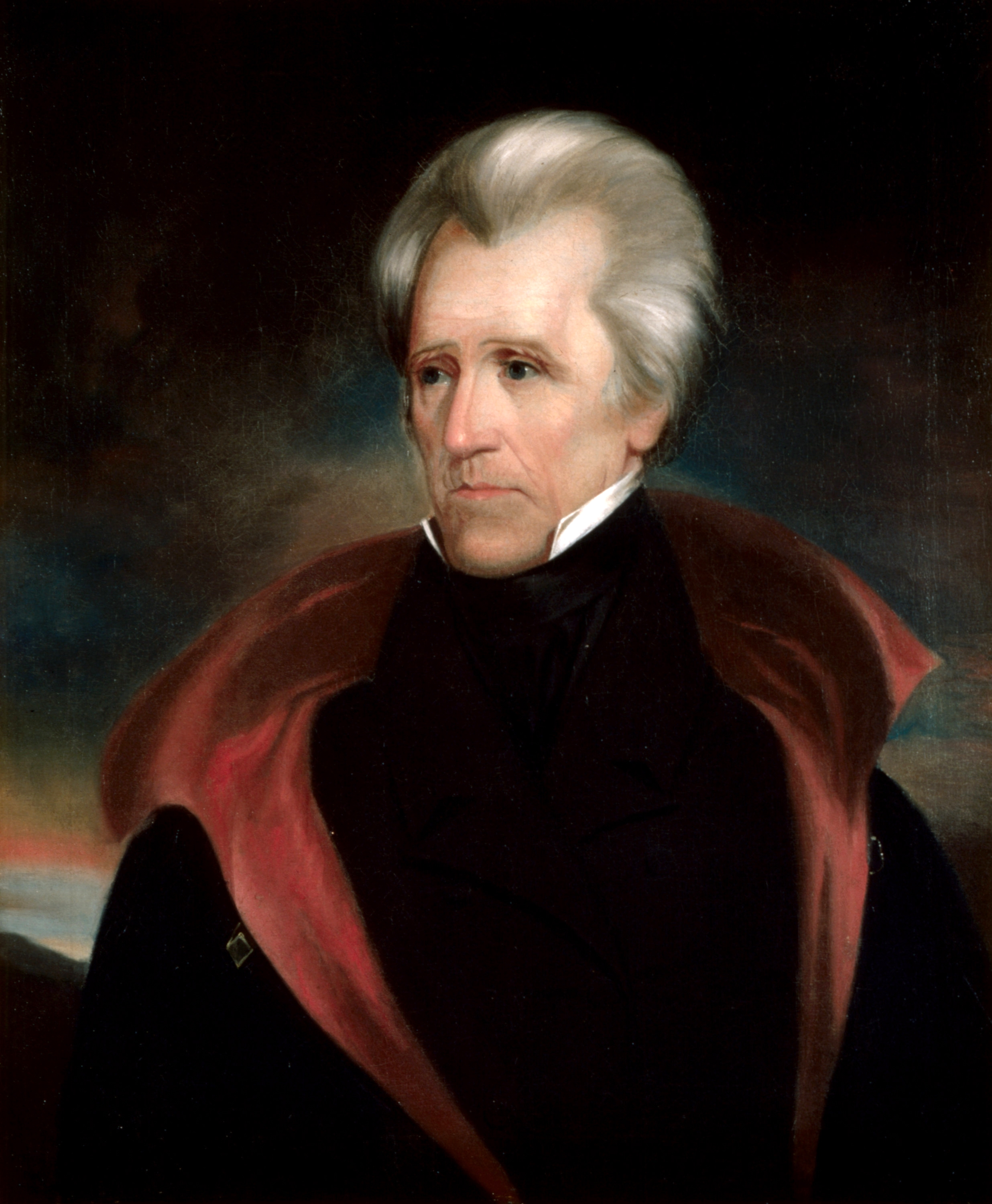

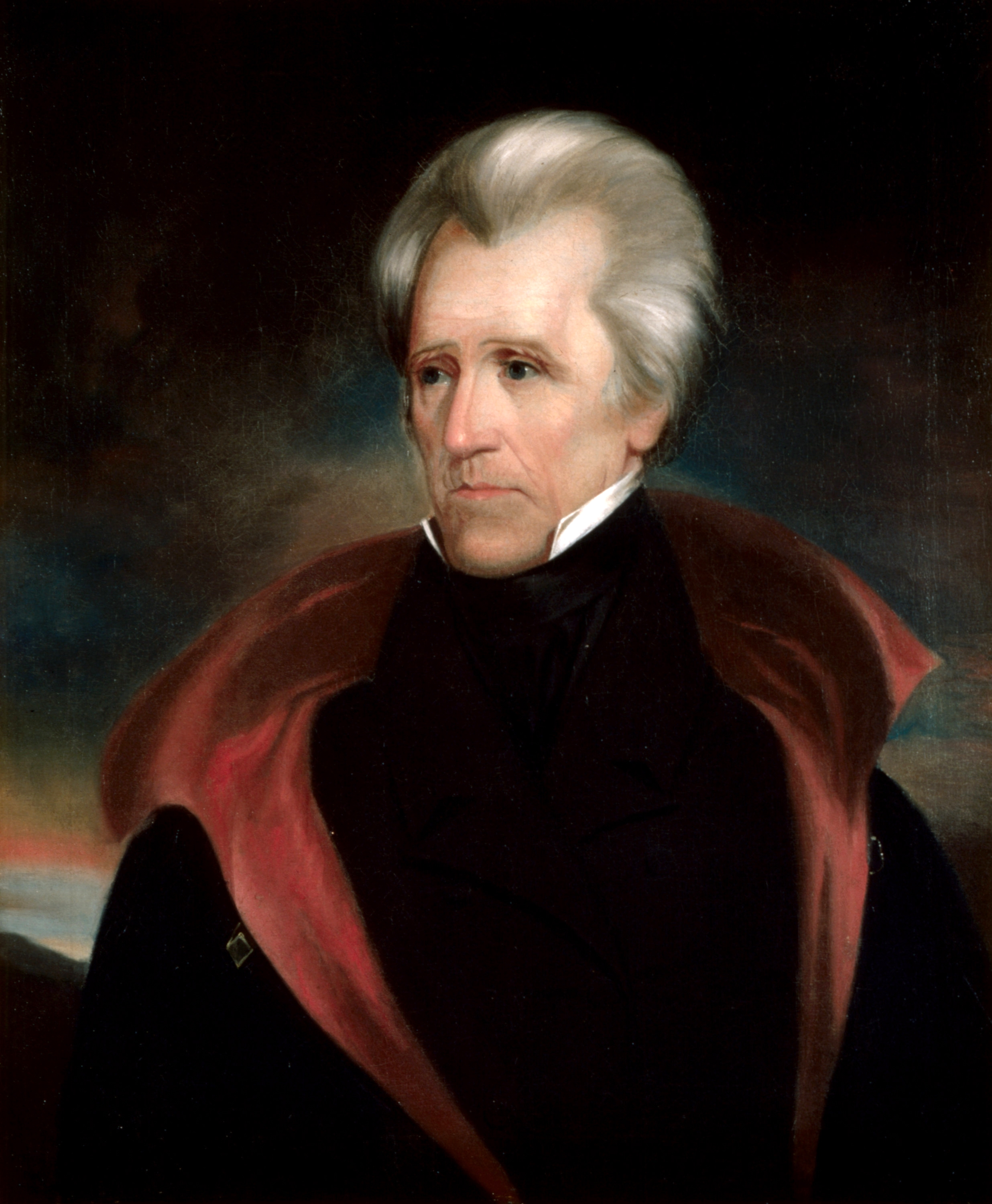
Nominee	Andrew Jackson	Andrew Jackson
Party	Democratic	Democratic
Alliance	Troup party	Union party
Home state	Tennessee	Tennessee
Running mate	Martin Van Buren	James Barbour
Electoral vote	11	0
Popular vote	13,881	7,367
Percentage	65.33%	34.67%
County results
Jackson (Troup)
50–60%
70–80%
90–100%
No Data

The 1832 United States presidential election in Georgia took place on November 5, 1832, as part of the 1832 United States presidential election. Voters chose 11 representatives, or electors to the Electoral College, who voted for President and Vice President.

There were two Andrew Jackson tickets in Georgia representing the two different local parties. The Troup party won with 13,881 votes, beating the Union party (formally Clark party) which got 7,367 votes. No other candidate for election was nominated by any of the factions and all received zero votes. Many sources have combined the vote when reporting the Georgia results, but this is legally incorrect.

The Troup party ran Jackson with Martin Van Buren, his official running mate. The Union party ran Jackson with Barbour as veteran members of the Clark party had never forgiven Van Buren for serving as William Crawford's campaign manager in the 1824 presidential election. Troup papers also weren't enthusiastic about Van Buren but feared that splitting the vote could lead to John Sergeant becoming vice president.

== Background ==
The first political divisions in the state fell along the lines of personal support for outstanding leaders in their struggle for power. Many of these factions were usually held together through personal friendships and family associations. The two factions in the previous election were the Clark faction, followers of Ex-Governor John Clark, and the Troup faction, followers of Ex-Governor George Troup.

Following losses to the Troup party, coupled with Clark's departure from Georgia to serve as a federal Indian agent and "Keeper of the Public Forests" in Florida, the Clark party entered a period of decline. It was proposed that the Clark party change its name to the Union party, a suggestion that was informally approved by the rank and tile of Clarke's former colleagues, and the name of the old champion gradually lost its usage.

By 1832 there was growing support among members of the Troup party and some members of the union party for Nullification. Despite this, both sides felt it was best to renominate Andrew Jackson for the presidency. They did not agree on, however, who should be the running mate. The Troup party preferred to support Jackson's official running mate even though they weren't enthusastic about him, fearing that splitting the vote could lead to John Sergeant becoming vice president. In contrast, veteran members of the Clark party couldn't support Martin Van Buren as they had never forgiven him for serving as William Crawford's campaign manager in the 1824 presidential election. Instead, they supported James Barbour. Publicly, the Union paper Federal Union accused Van Buren of supporting the protective tariff among other things.

== Results ==
United States presidential election in Georgia, 1832
Party	Candidate	Votes	Percentage	Electoral votes
Democratic	Andrew Jackson (Troup)	13,881	65.33%	11
Democratic	Andrew Jackson (Union)	7,367	34.67%	0
Totals		20,750	100.0%	11

== See also ==
- United States presidential elections in Georgia
