= 1828 United States presidential election in Georgia =

- November 3, 1828

Nominee	Andrew Jackson	Andrew Jackson
Party	Democratic	Democratic
Alliance	Troup party	Clark party
Home state	Tennessee	Tennessee
Running mate	William H. Crawford	John C. Calhoun
Electoral vote	9	0
Popular vote	10,508	8,854
Percentage	52.53%	44.26%
County results
Jackson (Troup)
50–60%
60–70%
70–80%
90–100%
Jackson (Clarke)
30–40%
40–50%
70–80%
No Data
Cherokee territory

The 1828 United States presidential election in Georgia took place on November 3, 1828, as part of the 1828 United States presidential election. Georgia voters chose 9 electors to the Electoral College, who voted for president and vice president.

There were two Andrew Jackson tickets in Georgia representing the two different local parties. The Troup party won with 9,712 votes, beating the Clark (or Clarke) party which got 7,991 votes. John Quincy Adams was not nominated by any of the parties and came in third with only 642 votes. The state rejected returns from 10 counties and 8 others submitted none. Including the rejected returns, the total votes are Jackson (Troup) 10,508, Jackson (Clark) 8,854 and Adams, 642. Many sources have combined the vote when reporting the Georgia results, but this is legally incorrect.

The Troup party ran Jackson with William H. Crawford for vice president but none actually voted for him, instead seven votes went to William Smith of South Carolina, a decision characterized as "throwing away seven votes on a man, not thought of by their constituents or by any of the other states." Two of the electors voted for the official running mate John C. Calhoun, who the Clark party ran as their running mate.

== Background ==
The first political divisions in the state fell along the lines of personal support for outstanding leaders in their struggle for power. Many of these factions were usually held together through personal friendships and family associations. The two factions at the time were the Clark party, followers of Ex-Governor John Clark, and the Troup party, followers of Ex-Governor George Troup.

The Clark party had slowly begun dying out after the death of its candidate in the 1827 Georgia gubernatorial election and the removal of its leader, John Clark, from the state in the same year. The remnants of the Clark party decried party divisions and pleaded for unanimous support of Andrew Jackson in 1828. The Troup party, on the other hand, staged an aggressive campaign against the Clarkites and the Tariff of Abominations, winning whelming victories for their nominees for Congress and the Electoral College.

The Troup party nominated William H. Crawford, Georgia's presidential nominee in 1824, as their vice presidential candidate in an attempt to win over voters to their slate. Elijah Burritt, a Clarkite editor for the newspaper Statesman & Patriot, accused the Troupers of attempting to deny the vice presidency to Calhoun, opening the way for Adam's running mate, Richard Rush, and wondered why Troupers had not simply nominated Rush themselves and been done with it.

While it was true that Crawford preferred Adams to Jackson in 1824, such preference no longer existed by 1828. However, he could not "consistently with its feelings and character" support either Calhoun or Richard Rush for vice president on the Jackson ticket. Crawford was clearly more concerned with Calhoun, contending that, should Calhoun fail to win the vice presidency, Jackson would not dare bring him into the Cabinet. In case he was mistaken on this point, Crawford pledged, "I will myself cause representations to be made to General Jackson that will prevent [Calhoun's]being taken into the Cabinet."

While the victorious Troup party's Jackson electors cast all of their votes for Jackson for President, only two of them supported Calhoun for vice president, with the other seven votes going to William Smith of South Carolina, a decision characterized as "throwing away seven votes on a man, not thought of by their constituents or by any of the other states."

== Results ==
1828 United States presidential election in Georgia (including rejected returns)
Party	Candidate	Votes	Percentage	Electoral votes
Democratic	Andrew Jackson (Troup)	10,508	52.53%	9
Democratic	Andrew Jackson (Clarke)	8,854	44.26%	0
National Republican	John Quincy Adams (incumbent)	642	3.21%	0
Totals		20,004	100.0%	9

== Aftermath ==
In the aftermath of its defeat, the Clark party would die out in the same year. In its ashes rose the Union party, a product of the forces of liberal democracy that brought white manhood suffrage and popular elections in the 1800s.

== See also ==
- United States presidential elections in Georgia
