= 1827 Georgia gubernatorial election =

- October 1, 1827
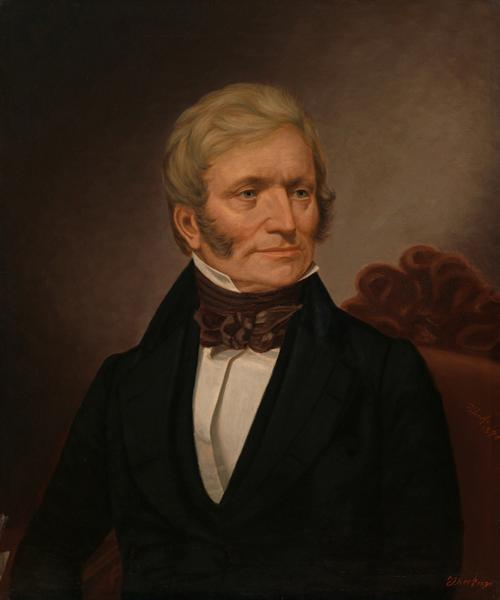
Nominee	John Forsyth	"Opposition": Matthew Talbot (Clark-DR); Edward F. Tattnall (Troup-DR); McDonald (?); Freeman Walker (DR); Alfred Cuthbert (Jacksonian); Others; (Note: Many newspapers combined the votes cast for candidates other than Forsyth under the term "Opposition.")
Party	Jacksonian
Alliance	Troup party
Popular vote	22,774 (Note: Data missing for several counties)	9,721
Percentage	70.08%	29.92%
- Results by County; Forsyth: 50–60% 60–70% 70–80% 80–90% >90% Opposition: 50–60% 60–70% 70–80% Cherokee territory: No Data
Governor before election
George Troup
Democratic-Republican
Elected Governor
John Forsyth
Jacksonian

The 1827 Georgia gubernatorial election was held on October 1, 1827, to elect the governor of Georgia. Due to the death of the Democratic-Republican Clark candidate Matthew Talbot, Jacksonian Troup candidate John Forsyth won in a landslide against a divided opposition.

== Background ==
The first political divisions in the state fell along the lines of personal support for outstanding leaders in their struggle for power. Many of these factions were usually held together through personal friendships and family associations. The two factions at the time were the Clark faction, followers of Ex-Governor John Clark, and the Troup faction, followers of incumbent Governor George Troup.

After Troup chose not to rerun for governor, the Troup party nominated John Forsyth as their candidate. The Clark party chose Captain Mathew Talbot.

== Election ==
On 17 September, Talbot unexpectedly died during his campaign. His death forced the Clark party to nominate Edward F. Tattnall, a member of the Troup party. At the same time, Duncan G. Campbell, one of the U.S. commissioners responsible for the Treaty of Indian Springs, was brought forward by his friends for the race but later dropped out. Other candidates who attempted to run included Freeman Walker, McDonald, and Alfred Cuthbert.

=== Results ===
1827 Georgia gubernatorial election (With most counties)
Party	Candidate	Votes	%
Jacksonian	John Forsyth	22,774	70.08
	"Opposition"	9,721	29.92
Total votes		40,412	100

Opposition vote broken down (With only 45 counties)
Party	Candidate	Votes	%
Democratic-Republican	Edward F. Tattnall	2,015	31.65
?	McDonald	1,026	16.12
Jacksonian	Alfred Cuthbert	892	14.01
Democratic-Republican	Freeman Walker	826	12.97
	Others	1,678	26.35
Total votes		6,367	100

== Aftermath ==
With the death of its gubernatorial candidate and the removal of Clark from Georgia to Florida, the Clark party would eventually die out the following year. In its ashes rose the Union party, a product of the forces of liberal democracy that brought white manhood suffrage and popular elections in the 1800s.
