= 1824 United States presidential election in Georgia =

- October 26 – December 2, 1824
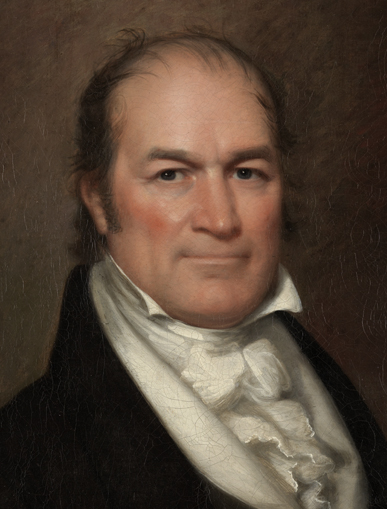

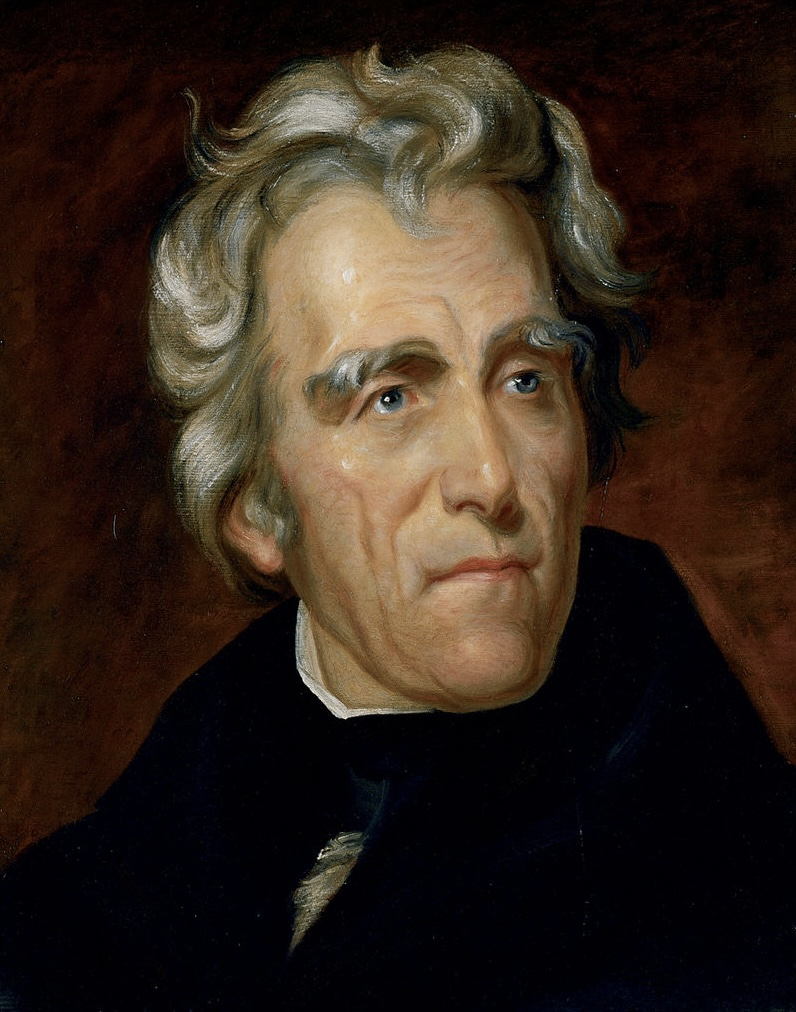
Nominee	William H. Crawford	Andrew Jackson
Party	Democratic-Republican	Democratic-Republican
Alliance	Crawford party	Clark party
Home state	Georgia	Tennessee
Running mate	Martin Van Buren (Note: Despite Nathaniel Macon being chosen as Crawford's running mate, Georgia cast all 9 of their electoral votes for Van Buren as Vice President.)	John C. Calhoun
Electoral vote	9	0
Popular vote	121	45
Percentage	72.9%	27.1%
President before election
James Monroe
Democratic-Republican
Elected President
John Quincy Adams
Democratic-Republican

The 1824 United States presidential election in Georgia took place on November 1, 1824, as part of the 1824 United States presidential election. The Georgia General Assembly chose 9 representatives, or electors to the Electoral College, who voted for President and Vice President.

During this time, political divisions in the state fell along the lines of personal support for outstanding leaders in their struggle for power. Many of these factions were usually held together through personal friendships and family associations. The two factions at the time were the Clark faction, followers of Ex-Governor John Clark, and the Crawford faction, followers of Secretary of the Treasury William H. Crawford.

As both houses of the assembly were controlled by the Crawford party, their slate won by a margin of 121 to 45 against the Clark party which nominated Andrew Jackson.

== Results ==
1824 United States presidential election in Georgia
Party	Candidate	Votes	Percentage	Electoral votes
Democratic-Republican	William H. Crawford	121	72.9%	9
Democratic-Republican	Andrew Jackson	45	27.1%	0
Totals		166	100%	9

== See also ==
- United States presidential elections in Georgia
