= 1825 Georgia gubernatorial election =

- October 3, 1825
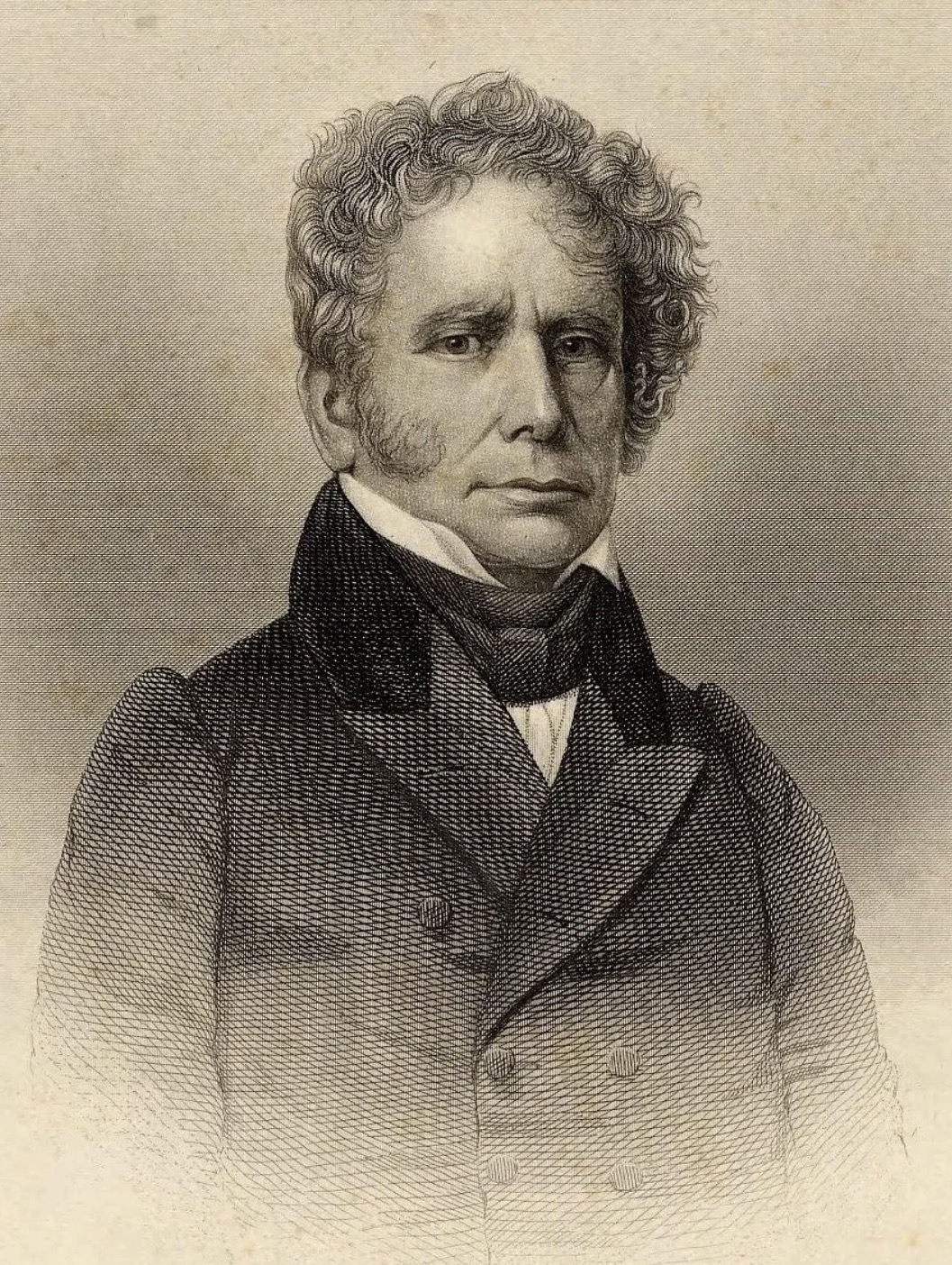

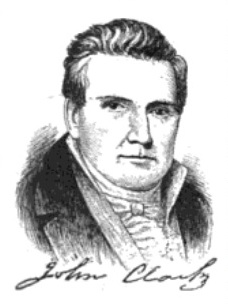
Nominee	George Troup	John Clark
Party	Democratic-Republican	Democratic-Republican
Alliance	Troup party	Clark party
Popular vote	20,665	20,002
Percentage	50.85%	49.15%
- Results by County; Troup: 50–60% 60–70% 70–80% 80–90% >90% Clark: 50–60% 60–70% 70–80% 80–90% Tie: Creek and Cherokee territory
Governor before election
George Troup
Democratic-Republican
Elected Governor
George Troup
Democratic-Republican

The 1825 Georgia gubernatorial election was held on October 3, 1825, to elect the governor of Georgia. It was the first popular election for governor in Georgia's history following its adoption by the Georgia General Assembly a year prior.

The election was between two long-time political rivals, then-Governor George Troup (Democratic-Republican and later Jacksonian Democrat) and independence war hero John Clark (Democratic-Republican). Ultimately, Troup emerged victorious by a narrow margin in the election, thanks in part by the recent signing of the Treaty of Indian Springs.

== Background ==
The first political divisions in the state fell along the lines of personal support for outstanding leaders in their struggle for power. Many of these factions were usually held together through personal friendships and family associations. The two factions at the time were the Clark faction, followers of Ex-Governor John Clark, and the Troup faction, followers of incumbent Governor George Troup.

A year before the election, the Georgia General Assembly had adopted a popular election for governor. Originally, the governor had been chosen from members of the General Assembly, which had been unicameral at the time. Following the split of the General Assembly into two houses in 1789, the governor was chosen by the Senate from among three members selected by the Assembly. In 1795, the process was changed to a joint vote by the General Assembly.

The Clark party, which supposedly represented the common-man, had taken credit for the change to the popular vote. On the other hand, the Troup party accepted it as a challenge to show that they were not deserving of being labeled aristocratic.

== Election ==
During the election, Clark garnered much of his support from North Carolina immigrants and those residing on the frontier, whereas Troup enjoyed backing from the more urbanized and well-established areas of Georgia, as well as from Virginia immigrants. Troup's re-election can be attributed to the efforts of his friends and his clashes with federal officials over the issue of Creek removal.

=== Results ===
1825 Georgia gubernatorial election
Party	Candidate	Votes	%
Democratic-Republican	George Troup	20,550	50.85
Democratic-Republican	John Clark	19,862	49.15
Total votes		40,412	100

Results for Rabun County (Not included in the official returns)
Party	Candidate	Votes	%
Democratic-Republican	George Troup	115	45.10
Democratic-Republican	John Clark	140	54.90
Total votes		255	100
