= Nicholas Ware =

American politician (1769–1824)

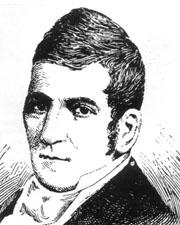

United States Senator from Georgia
- In office November 10, 1821 – September 7, 1824
- Preceded by: Freeman Walker
- Succeeded by: Thomas W. Cobb

Member of the Georgia House of Representatives
- In office 1808-1811; 1814-1815

Personal details
- Born: February 16, 1776 Caroline County, Virginia
- Died: September 7, 1824 (aged 48) New York City, U.S.
- Party: Democratic-Republican
- Spouse: Susan Brooks Savage
- Children: Robert Alexander Ware; Susan Margaret Ware
- Relatives: Francis W. Eppes (son-in-law)

Nicholas Ware (February 16, 1776 – September 7, 1824) was a United States senator from Georgia.

Ware was born in Caroline County, Virginia and later moved with his parents to Edgefield, South Carolina and a few years later to Augusta, Georgia. He received a thorough English education and studied medicine. He studied law in Augusta as well as at the Litchfield Law School in Litchfield, Connecticut. He was admitted to the bar and commenced practice in Augusta.

From 1808 to 1811 and in 1814–1815, Ware was a member of the Georgia House of Representatives. He was elected as mayor of Augusta, serving from 1819 to 1821. That year the Georgia legislature elected him as a Democratic-Republican (later as a Crawford Republican) to the U.S. Senate to fill the vacancy caused by the resignation of Freeman Walker; he served from November 10, 1821, until his death in New York City in 1824. Ware was interred under the annex of Grace Church.

He was a planter and slave owner. At the time of the 1820 census, he owned 62 slaves and had extensive plantation near Augusta. He developed it for cotton, the major commodity crop of the Deep South in the antebellum era.

He married Susan Brooks Savage, with whom he had two children, Robert Alexander Ware (May 10, 1807 – July 19, 1893) and Susan Margaret Ware (February 14, 1815 – September 1, 1887). His daughter, Susan, first married a man named Crouch; after being widowed, she married Francis W. Eppes of Tallahassee, Florida.

== See also ==
- Gertrude Herbert Institute of Art ("Ware's Folly"), Ware's former home
- List of members of the United States Congress who died in office (1790–1899)

U.S. Senate
Preceded by Freeman Walker	U.S. senator (Class 2) from Georgia; 1821–1824; Served alongside: John Elliott	Succeeded by Thomas W. Cobb
