= John Pendleton King =

American politician (1799–1888)

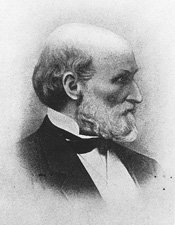

United States Senator from Georgia
- In office November 21, 1833 – November 1, 1837
- Preceded by: George Troup
- Succeeded by: Wilson Lumpkin

Personal details
- Born: April 3, 1799 Glasgow, Kentucky
- Died: March 19, 1888 (aged 88) Summerville, Georgia
- Party: Jacksonian

John Pendleton King (April 3, 1799 – March 19, 1888) was an attorney, planter, and politician, serving as United States Senator from Georgia. He resigned in 1837 before the end of his term to devote himself to his plantation and business, serving for nearly 40 years as president of the Georgia Railroad and Banking Company, and becoming a cotton manufacturer. He acquired large plantation holdings, and by 1860 owned 69 slaves to work the cotton fields and related trades.

== Early life and education ==
Born in Glasgow, Kentucky, King moved in infancy with his parents to Bedford County, Tennessee, and then to Augusta, Georgia, in 1815. He graduated from the Academy of Richmond County in Augusta, and studied law. He was admitted to the bar in 1819 and practiced in Augusta.

== Marriage and family ==
After beginning his practice, King married Mary Louise Woodward, daughter of John Woodward and wife Harriet Bixby. They had at least two daughters and a son together. Grace Sterling King married John McPherson Berrien Connelly and they had children. Mary Livingstone King married Henry Paget, 4th Marquess of Anglesey (1835–1898).

== Studies and politics ==
King studied in Europe from 1822 to 1824. He returned and continued the practice of law in Augusta until 1829. He was a member of the State constitutional conventions in 1830 and 1833. He was appointed judge of the Court of Common Pleas in 1831. He was elected in 1833 as a Jacksonian (later Democrat) to the United States Senate to fill the vacancy caused by the resignation of George M. Troup. He was reelected in 1834 and served from November 21, 1833, until November 1, 1837, when he resigned. In that year, the United States was in the midst of a financial panic, which King blamed entirely on the policies of Andrew Jackson, which included removal of federal deposits from the Bank of the United States and the Specie Circular requiring purchases of federal land to be made in gold or silver currency, rather than bank notes or other instruments.

== Business and plantation ==
After his time in politics, King became president of the Georgia Railroad and Banking Company, serving from 1841 to 1878. He worked as a railroad promoter and cotton manufacturer. In 1865 he was a member of the State constitutional convention in 1865.

During this period he also continued as a planter and expanded his landholdings considerably, amassing a large estate. From 1830, he more than tripled the number of slaves he owned, in order to work those properties. In 1830, he owned 22 slaves in Augusta, Georgia. In 1840, he owned 55 slaves. In 1850, he owned 57 slaves. In 1860, he owned 68 slaves. King died in Summerville, Georgia and was interred in St. Paul's Churchyard, Augusta.

== Honors and legacy ==
King is the namesake of the city of Kingston, Georgia. Pendleton King Park in Augusta, Georgia is named for his grandson, John Pendleton King II, who died at age 29 of a brain aneurysm. Kings Mill was also named after him.

U.S. Senate
Preceded by George Troup	U.S. senator (Class 2) from Georgia; November 21, 1833 - November 1, 1837; Served alongside: John Forsyth, Alfred Cuthbert	Succeeded by Wilson Lumpkin
Honorary titles
Preceded by Peleg Sprague	Most senior living U.S. senator (Sitting or former); October 13, 1880 - March 19, 1888	Succeeded by Henry A. Foster
