= John A. Cuthbert =

American politician (1788–1881)

John Alfred Cuthbert (June 3, 1788 – September 22, 1881) was an American politician, soldier and lawyer. He was the brother of Alfred Cuthbert.

== Biography ==
Born in Savannah, Georgia in 1788, Cuthbert graduated from Princeton College, studied law, gained admission to the state bar in 1809 and began practicing law in Eatonton, Georgia.

Cuthbert served in the Georgia House of Representatives in 1811, 1813 and 1817. During the War of 1812, he commanded a volunteer company. In 1814 and 1815, Cuthbert served in the Georgia Senate. In 1818, he was elected as a Democratic-Republican Representative from Georgia to the 16th United States Congress and served from March 4, 1819, until March 3, 1821.

In 1822, United States President James Monroe appointed Cuthbert as a commissioner to treat with the Creek and Cherokee Indians. Cuthbert was also reelected to the Georgia house of representatives in 1822. In 1830, 1833 and 1834, he was the secretary of the Georgia Senate. From 1831 to 1837, he served as editor and subsequently proprietor of the Federal Union in Milledgeville, Georgia. In 1837, Cuthbert moved to Mobile, Alabama, and practiced law.

In 1840, Cuthbert was elected judge of the county court of Mobile County, Alabama. In 1852, the Governor of Alabama appointed Cuthbert judge of the circuit court of Mobile County in 1852. After stepping down from that judicial post, Cuthbert practiced law until his death on September 22, 1881, at Sans Souci, on Mon Louis Island in the Mobile Bay off the coast of Alabama. He was buried in a private burying ground on that same island.

== Legacy ==
Cuthbert, Georgia, was named in his honor.

== Notes ==
Political offices
Preceded by Robert Creswell	Lieutenant Governor of South Carolina; 1816–1818	Succeeded by William Youngblood
U.S. House of Representatives
Preceded by Zadock Cook	Member of the U.S. House of Representatives from Georgia's at-large congressional district March 4, 1819 – March 3, 1821	Succeeded by Edward Fenwick Tattnall
