= Hofwyl-Broadfield Plantation =

Historic plantation in the US state of Georgia

- U.S. National Register of Historic Places
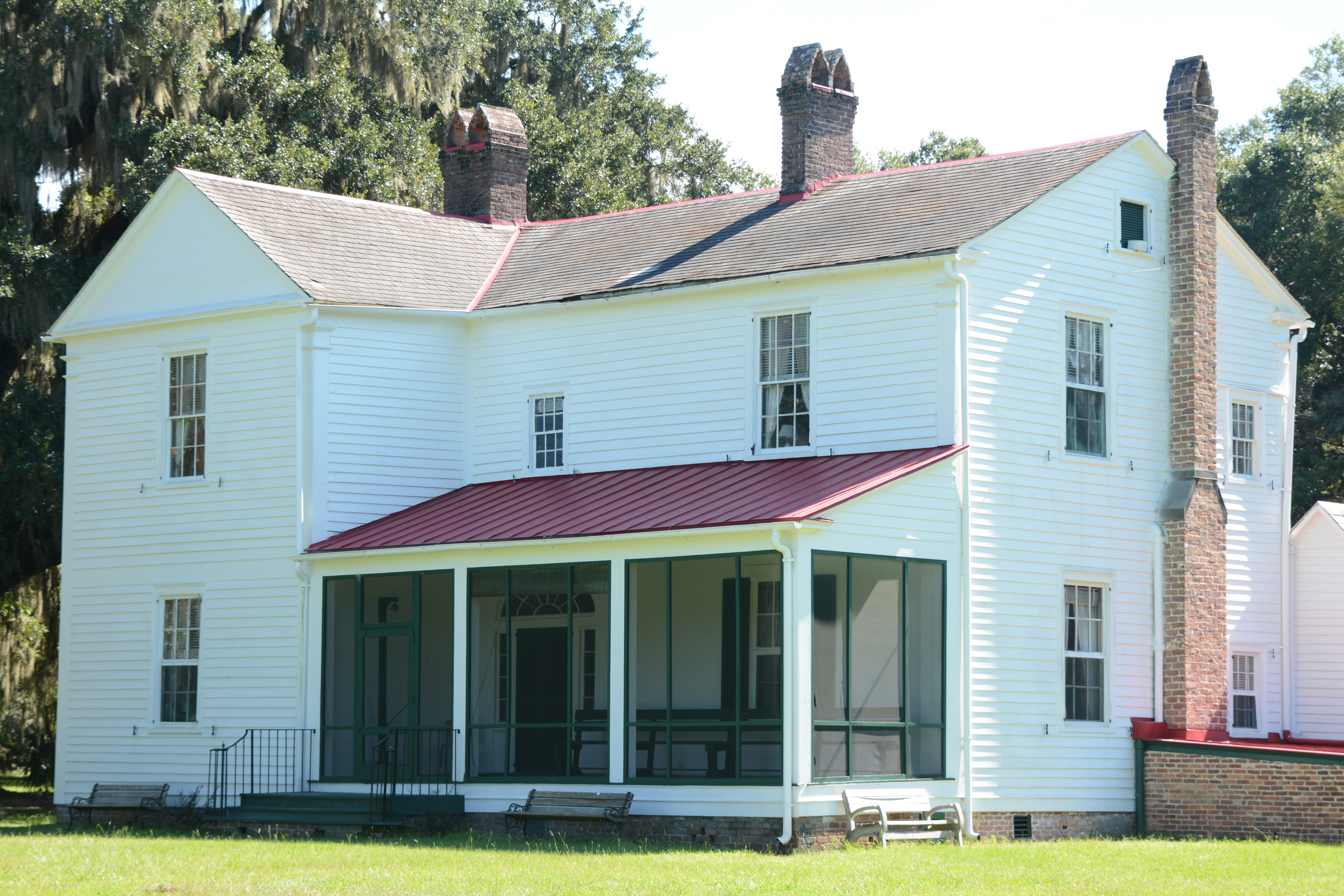
- Back of the main house

- Location within Georgia Location within the United States
- Nearest city: Darien, Georgia
- Coordinates: 31.30500°N 81.45366°W
- Area: 1,500 acres (610 ha)
- NRHP reference No.: 76000635
- Added to NRHP: July 12, 1976

The Hofwyl-Broadfield Plantation was a plantation on the Altamaha River in Glynn County, Georgia, United States. Operated as a forced-labor farm using enslaved peoples until 1865, it produced rice from 1800 until 1915, when growing rice became unprofitable. Then it was primarily a dairy farm until 1942. Since 1976, the Georgia Department of Natural Resources has managed it as Hofwyl-Broadfield Plantation State Historic Site.

== History ==
The property that would become the Hofwyl-Broadfield Plantation was originally named Broadface; in 1806, the land was purchased by William Brailford, who renamed it Broadfield. "The plantation was built in 1807 as a large rice producer with over seven thousand acres of land and more than 350 West African slaves," mostly from Senegal and Sierre Leone, according to historians Amy Lotson and Patrick Holliday.

After Brailford died, the property passed to his son-in-law, Dr. James M. Troup, brother of Governor George Troup. When Troup died in 1849, he held 357 people as slaves and 7,300 acres in land; the property passed on to his daughter, Ophilia Troup, and her husband, George Dent. The current main house was built in the early 1850s and they added "Hofwyl" to the name about that time.

With the outbreak of the American Civil War, George Dent and his 15-year-old son James went to serve in the Confederate Army. Ophilia and her children moved to a refugee camp near Waycross, Georgia. After the war, large parts of the land was sold to pay taxes and by the time James Dent took over the property in 1880, the wealth was gone. When James Dent died in 1913 the family was still in debt. Rice farming had become unprofitable, largely because the owners were no longer allowed to enslave laborers.

His son, James, and his daughters, Miriam and Ophilia Dent, operated the land as a dairy farm until 1942. At its peak as a dairy farm, it had about 35 cows and produced 100 to 150 bottles of milk per day. When the dairy was shut down in 1942, the property was finally out of debt. The two sisters (the fifth generation of the family to live there) lived at the house until the last survivor, Ophelia, died in 1973. She left the property to the state of Georgia.

Since then, the marsh has reclaimed the rice fields. The plantation site was added to the National Register of Historic Places in 1976 and is operated as a Georgia State Historic Site. The Georgia Department of Natural Resources manages 1,268 acres of land and 696 acres of marsh.

== Photos ==
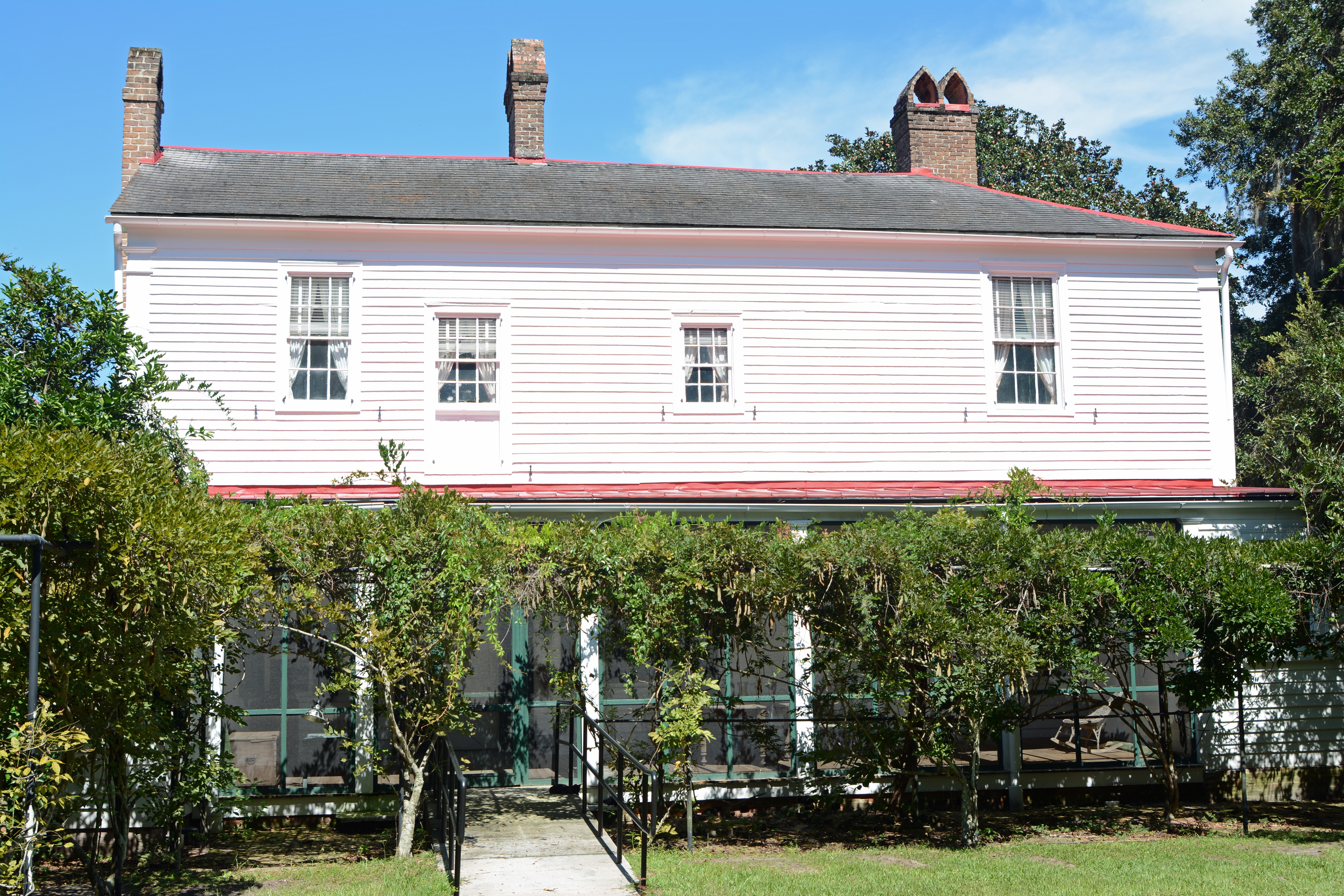
Front of the main house

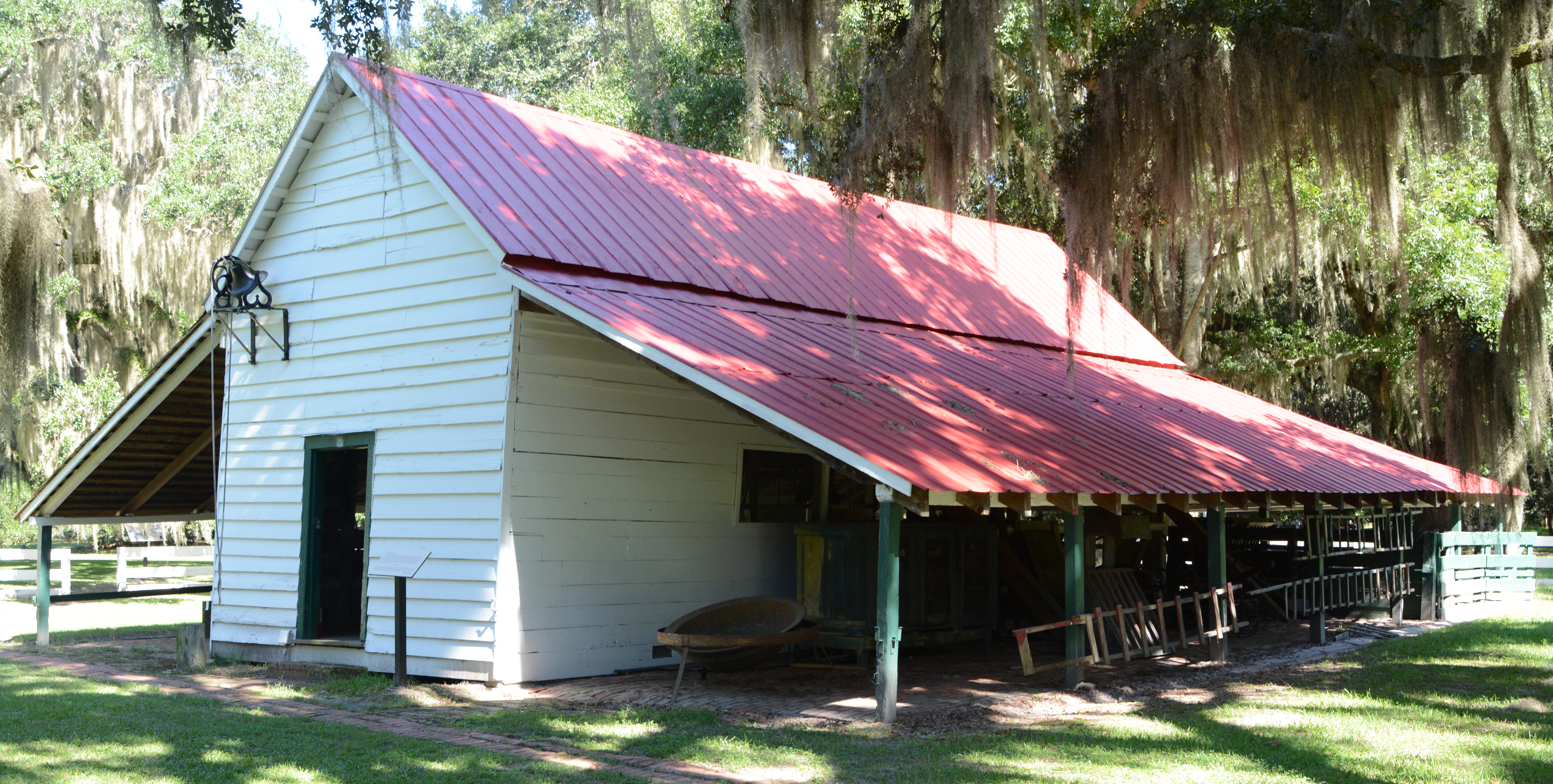
Barn on the plantation

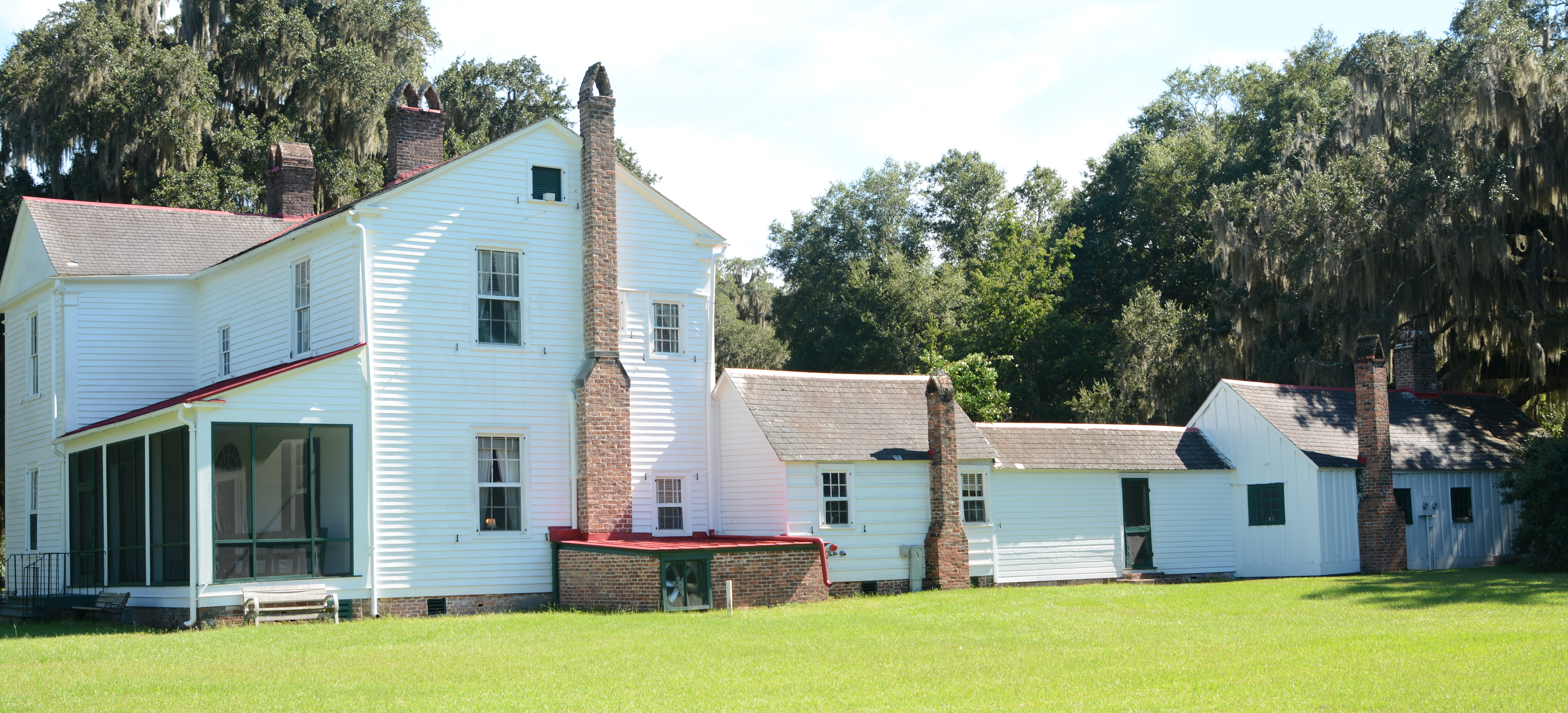
Side of the main house, showing the detached kitchen

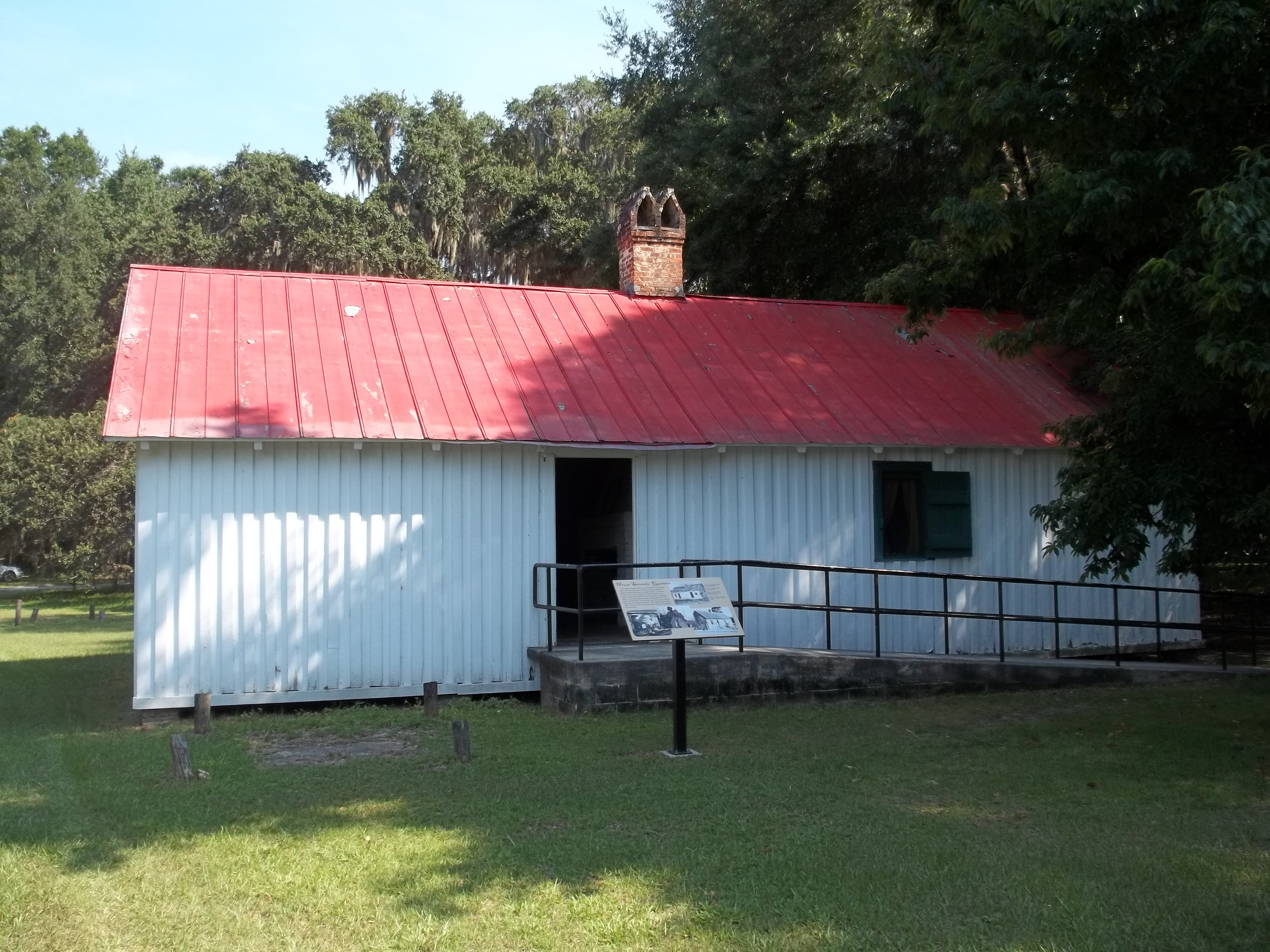
Servant's quarters
