= Freeman Walker =

American politician (1780–1827)

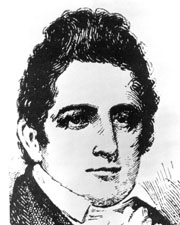

United States Senator from Georgia
- In office November 6, 1819 – August 6, 1821
- Preceded by: John Forsyth
- Succeeded by: Nicholas Ware

Member of the Georgia House of Representatives
- In office 1807–1811

Personal details
- Born: October 25, 1780 Charles City, Virginia
- Died: September 23, 1827 (aged 46) Augusta, Georgia
- Party: Democratic-Republican

Freeman Walker (October 25, 1780 – September 23, 1827) was a United States senator from Georgia. Born in Charles City, Virginia, he attended the common schools; in 1797, he moved to Augusta, Georgia.

Walker studied law, and was admitted to the bar in 1803, commencing practice in Augusta. He was a member of the Georgia House of Representatives from 1807 to 1811, and was mayor of Augusta in 1818 and 1819. He was elected as a Democratic-Republican to the U.S. Senate to fill the vacancy caused by the resignation of John Forsyth, serving from November 6, 1819, to August 6, 1821, when he resigned. He was again mayor of Augusta in 1823. Walker died in Augusta in 1827; interment was in the Walker family cemetery.

Freeman Walker's son was Confederate major general William H.T. Walker, who served in the American Civil War.

== Popular culture ==
Freeman Walker is a 2008 novel by David Allan Cates, and is also the name of the title character. There is no connection between this fictional character and the historical Walker, though the story is set in the South in the 19th century, and the use of the same name may have been a coincidence.

== Legacy ==
Walker County, Georgia, was named for Senator Walker.

U.S. Senate
Preceded by John Forsyth	U.S. senator (Class 2) from Georgia; November 6, 1819 – August 6, 1821; Served alongside: John Elliott	Succeeded by Nicholas Ware
