= Edward F. Tattnall =

American politician (1788–1832)

Member of the U.S. House of Representatives from Georgia's 1st district
- In office March 4, 1827 – 1827
- Preceded by: New seat
- Succeeded by: George R. Gilmer

Member of the U.S. House of Representatives from Georgia's at-large district
- In office March 4, 1821 – March 3, 1827
- Preceded by: John A. Cuthbert
- Succeeded by: District eliminated

Member of the Georgia House of Representatives
- In office 1818–1819

Personal details
- Born: Edward Fenwick Tattnall; June 3, 1788 Savannah, Georgia, U.S.
- Died: November 21, 1832 (aged 44) Savannah, Georgia, U.S.
- Resting place: Bonaventure Cemetery, Savannah, Georgia, U.S.
- Party: Jacksonian
- Other political affiliations: Democratic-Republican
- Parent(s): Josiah Tattnall Jr. Harriet Fenwick
- Profession: Politician, soldier, lawyer

Edward Fenwick Tattnall (June 3, 1788 – November 21, 1832) was an American politician, soldier and lawyer.

== Biography ==
Tattnall was born in Savannah, Georgia, in 1788 to Josiah Tattnall Jr. and Harriet Fenwick. He was educated in England. He was solicitor general from November 1816 until September 1817. He served in the Georgia House of Representatives in 1818 and 1819. Tattnall was elected as a Democratic-Republican Representative from Georgia to the 17th United States Congress. He was reelected to the 18th, 19th and 20th United States Congresses and served from March 4, 1821, until his resignation in 1827 before the start of the 20th Congress.

Tattnall served as first captain of the Savannah Volunteer Guards. He died in Savannah on November 21, 1832, and was buried in that city's Bonaventure Cemetery.

U.S. House of Representatives
Preceded by John A. Cuthbert	Member of the U.S. House of Representatives from Georgia's at-large congressional district March 4, 1821 – March 4, 1827	Succeeded by District eliminated
Preceded by New seat	Member of the U.S. House of Representatives from Georgia's 1st congressional district March 4, 1827 – 1827	Succeeded by George R. Gilmer
