= Alfred Cuthbert =

American politician (1785–1856)

United States Senator from Georgia
- In office January 12, 1835 – March 3, 1843
- Preceded by: John Forsyth
- Succeeded by: Walter T. Colquitt

Member of the U.S. House of Representatives from Georgia's at-large district
- In office December 13, 1813 – November 9, 1816
- Preceded by: William Wyatt Bibb
- Succeeded by: Zadock Cook
- In office March 4, 1821 – March 3, 1827
- Preceded by: Thomas W. Cobb
- Succeeded by: John Floyd

Member of the Georgia Senate
- In office 1817–1819

Member of the Georgia House of Representatives
- In office 1810–1813

Personal details
- Born: December 23, 1785 Savannah, Georgia
- Died: July 9, 1856 (aged 70) Monticello, Georgia
- Party: Democratic

Alfred Cuthbert (December 23, 1785 – July 9, 1856) was a United States representative and Senator from Georgia. He should not be confused with his brother, John Alfred Cuthbert.

== Life and career ==
Cuthbert was born in Savannah. He was instructed by private tutors. He graduated from Princeton College in 1803. He studied law and was admitted to the state bar about 1805 but did not practice.

In 1809, he was captain of a company of volunteer infantry, and was a member of the Georgia House of Representatives from 1810 to 1813. Cuthbert was elected as a Democratic-Republican Representative to the Thirteenth Congress to fill the vacancy caused by the resignation of William W. Bibb, and was reelected to the Fourteenth Congress and served from December 13, 1813, to November 9, 1816, when he resigned. He was a member of the Georgia Senate from 1817 to 1819, and was elected to the Seventeenth, Eighteenth, and Nineteenth Congresses, serving from March 4, 1821, to March 3, 1827.

He was not a candidate for renomination in 1826, but was elected as a Democrat to the U.S. Senate to fill the vacancy caused by the resignation of John Forsyth; he was reelected in 1837, and served from January 12, 1835, to March 3, 1843. Cuthbert was not a candidate for reelection in 1843, and retired from active business pursuits and lived on his estate near Monticello in Jasper County until his death in 1856; interment was in Summerville Cemetery, Augusta, Georgia.

U.S. House of Representatives
Preceded by William Wyatt Bibb	Member of the U.S. House of Representatives from Georgia's at-large congressional district December 13, 1813 – November 9, 1816	Succeeded by Zadock Cook
Preceded by Thomas W. Cobb	Member of the U.S. House of Representatives from Georgia's at-large congressional district March 4, 1821 – March 3, 1827	Succeeded by John Floyd
U.S. Senate
Preceded by John Forsyth	U.S. senator (Class 3) from Georgia; January 12, 1835 – March 3, 1843; Served alongside: John Pendleton King, Wilson Lumpkin, John M. Berrien	Succeeded by Walter T. Colquitt
