= Wilson Lumpkin =

American politician (1783–1870)

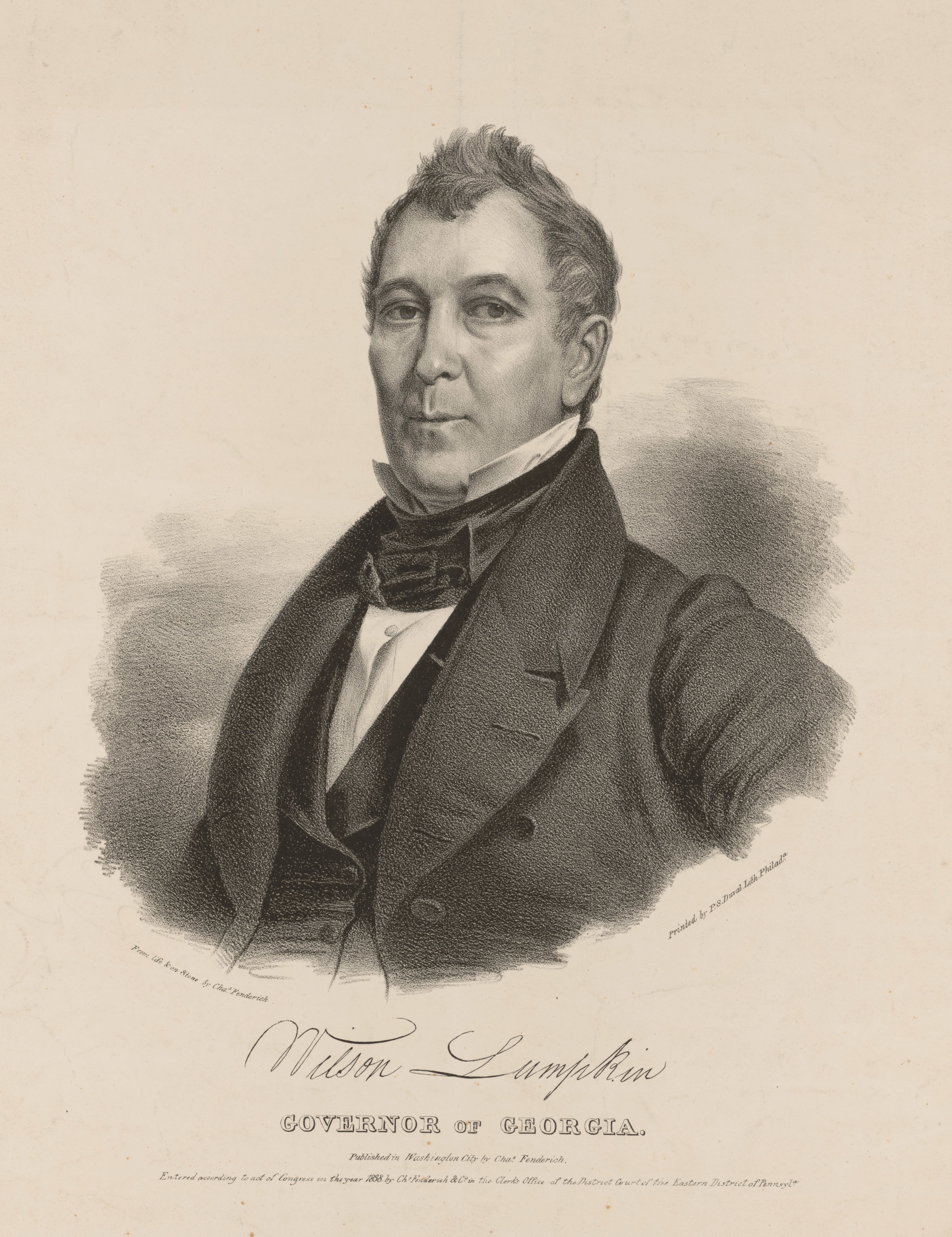
- Wilson Lumpkin

United States Senator from Georgia
- In office November 22, 1837 – March 3, 1841
- Preceded by: John P. King
- Succeeded by: John M. Berrien

35th Governor of Georgia
- In office November 9, 1831 – November 4, 1835
- Preceded by: George R. Gilmer
- Succeeded by: William Schley

Member of the U.S. House of Representatives from Georgia's at-large district
- In office March 4, 1829 – 1831
- Preceded by: district created
- Succeeded by: Augustin Smith Clayton

Member of the U.S. House of Representatives from Georgia's 4th district
- In office March 4, 1827 – March 3, 1829
- Preceded by: district created
- Succeeded by: Hugh A. Haralson

Member of the U.S. House of Representatives from Georgia's at-large district
- In office March 4, 1815 – March 3, 1817
- Preceded by: George Troup
- Succeeded by: Thomas W. Cobb

Member of the Georgia House of Representatives
- In office 1804-1812

Personal details
- Born: January 14, 1783 near Dan River, Virginia
- Died: December 28, 1870 (aged 87) Athens, Georgia
- Party: Democratic

Wilson Lumpkin (January 14, 1783 – December 28, 1870) was an American planter, attorney, and politician. He served two terms as the governor of Georgia, from 1831 to 1835, in the period of Indian Removal of the Creek and Cherokee peoples to Indian Territory to make way for development of their lands by European Americans. He also served in the state house, and as a United States representative and US Senator. He ran from Clarke County, Georgia, in the northeast part of the state.

== Early life ==
Born near Dan River, Virginia, Lumpkin moved in 1784 to Oglethorpe County, Georgia, with his parents, who settled near Point Peter and subsequently in Lexington, Georgia. He attended common schools, then taught school and farmed. He "read the law" with an established practice and was admitted to the bar; he commenced practice in Athens, Georgia, in Clarke County, in the northeastern part of the state. He was of entirely English ancestry; his first immigrant ancestor was Thomas Lumpkin, who moved from England to Virginia during the colonial period.

== Political life ==
Lumpkin entered political life by joining the Democratic-Republican Party. He was elected as a member of the Georgia House of Representatives, serving four terms from 1804 to 1812. After that, he ran for Congress in 1814, following the War of 1812, and was elected as a Representative to the Fourteenth United States Congress, serving one term from March 4, 1815, to March 3, 1817. He was an unsuccessful candidate for reelection. He received an appointment by the Georgia governor as the State Indian Commissioner, where he ran boundary lines between the state of Georgia and Creek Indian lands as part of the Treaty of the Creek Agency (1818).

Nearly a decade later, Lumpkin returned to Congress, being elected to the Twentieth, Twenty-first, and Twenty-second Congresses and serving from March 4, 1827, until his resignation in 1831 before the convening of the Twenty-second Congress. He ran for the governorship; he was also an appointed commissioner on the Georgia–Florida boundary line commission.

Lumpkin was elected Governor of Georgia in November 1831, for what was then the standard two-year term. In that election he received 27,305 votes and the incumbent governor George R. Gilmer, also a planter, received 25,863 votes. Lumpkin was reelected as governor in 1833, due in part to the nullification crisis, and served until 1835. In 1835, Lumpkin was appointed as commissioner under the Cherokee treaty, which transferred virtually all of the remainder of Cherokee lands to the United States in exchange for payments and land in Indian Territory. The Cherokee lands were granted to US citizens by lottery, and several new counties were organized.

As governor, Lumpkin directed the release of two missionaries, Samuel A. Worcester and Elizur Butler, who had been imprisoned for dwelling in the Cherokee territory and refusing to take an oath of allegiance to Georgia. The case was taken before the Supreme Court in Worcester v. Georgia and decided in their favor in 1832.

Lumpkin was elected to the U.S. Senate to fill the vacancy caused by the resignation of John P. King and served the remainder of his term from November 22, 1837, to March 3, 1841. While in the Senate, he was chairman of the Committee on Manufactures (Twenty-sixth Congress). He was appointed by the governor as a member of the State Board of Public Works. He died a few years after the end of the Civil War, in Athens in 1870; interment was in Oconee Hill Cemetery.

== Legacy ==
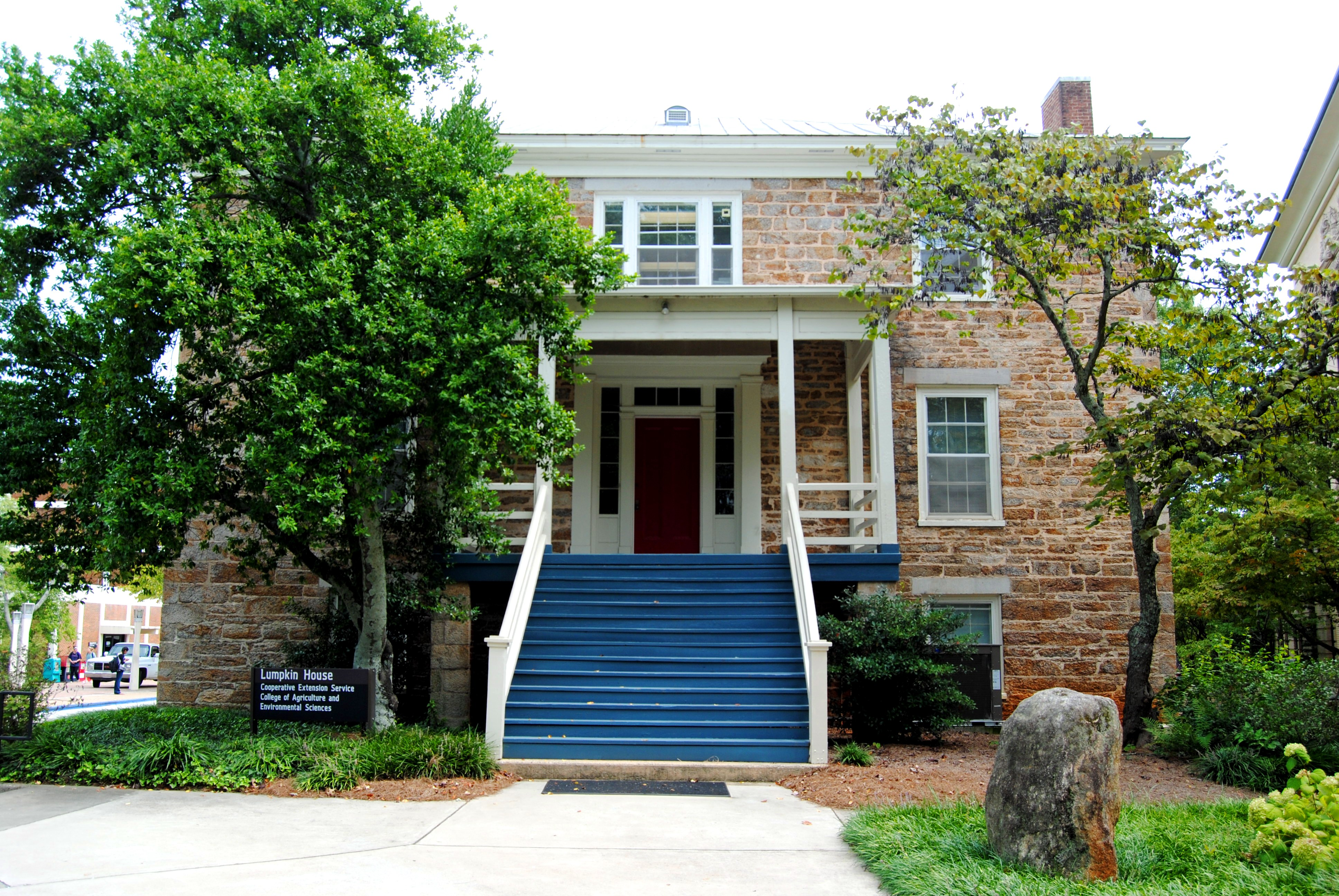
Governor Wilson Lumpkin House, c. 1842, photographer facing east

Lumpkin's grandson, Middleton P. Barrow, also served in the U.S. Senate. Lumpkin's brother Joseph Henry Lumpkin was the first chief justice of the Georgia supreme court. Their nephew John Henry Lumpkin was a U.S. Representative from Georgia. The settlers of Terminus (current-day Atlanta) voted to rename their town "Lumpkin" after Wilson Lumpkin. He instead asked for his young daughter Martha Atalanta Lumpkin (later Compton), to be the honoree of the city's first true name, "Marthasville."

Lumpkin County, Georgia, is named for him. The Lumpkin House on the campus of the University of Georgia was built by Lumpkin and is named in his memory.

U.S. House of Representatives
Preceded by George Troup	Member of the U.S. House of Representatives from Georgia's at-large congressional district March 4, 1815 – March 4, 1817	Succeeded by Thomas Willis Cobb
Preceded by Representatives elected at large	Member of the U.S. House of Representatives from Georgia's 4th congressional district March 4, 1827 – March 4, 1829	Succeeded by Representatives elected at large
Preceded by Representatives elected by district	Member of the U.S. House of Representatives from Georgia's at-large congressional district March 4, 1829 – 1831	Succeeded by Augustin Smith Clayton
Political offices
Preceded by George R. Gilmer	Governor of Georgia; 1831–1835	Succeeded by William Schley
U.S. Senate
Preceded by John Pendleton King	U.S. senator (Class 2) from Georgia; November 22, 1837 – March 4, 1841; Served alongside: Alfred Cuthbert	Succeeded by John Macpherson Berrien
Honorary titles
Preceded by Henry Dodge	Oldest living U.S. senator June 19, 1867 – December 28, 1870	Succeeded by John Ruggles
