= George R. Gilmer =

American politician (1790–1859)

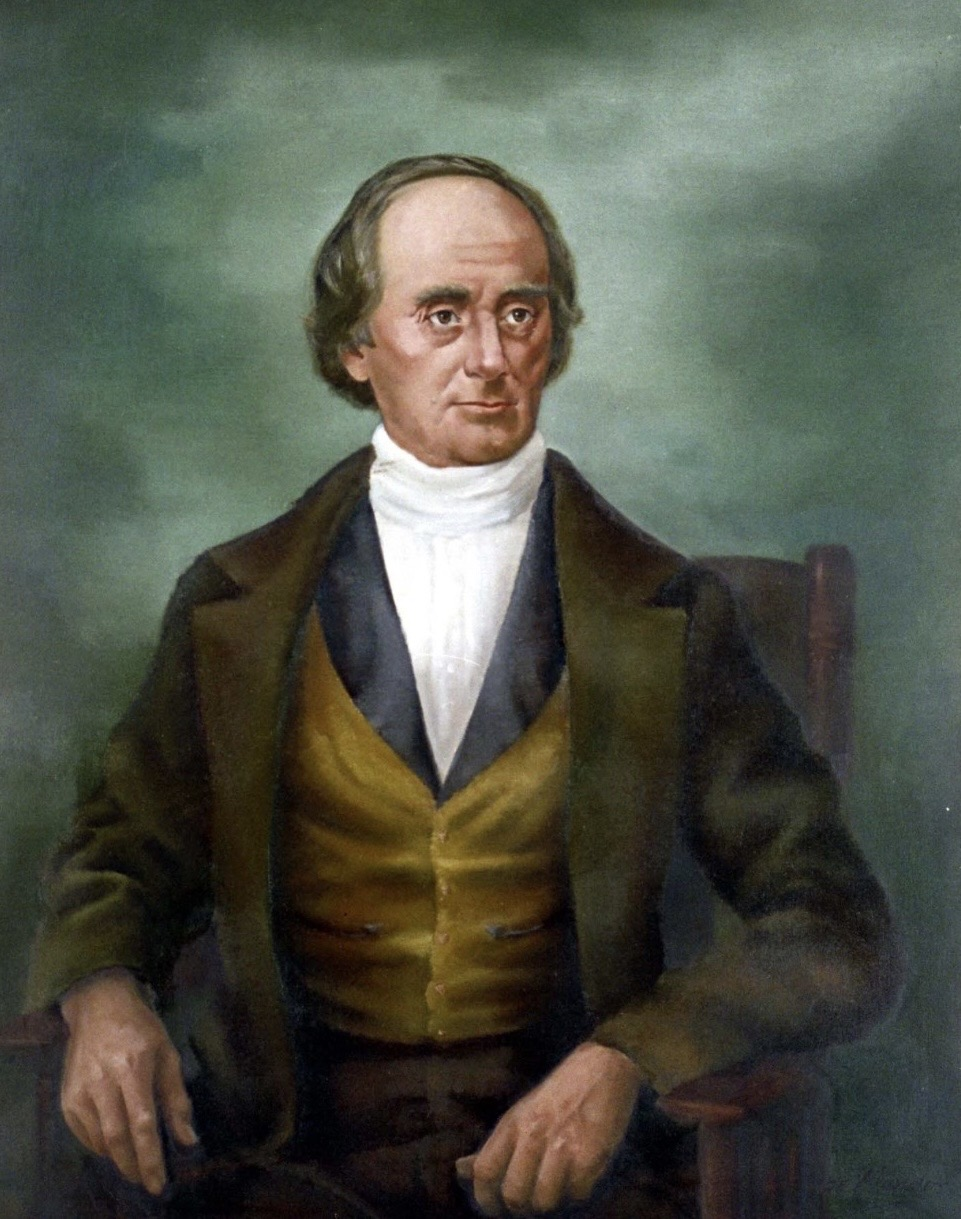

34th Governor of Georgia
- In office November 8, 1837 – November 6, 1839
- Preceded by: William Schley
- Succeeded by: Charles James McDonald
- In office November 4, 1829 – November 9, 1831
- Preceded by: John Forsyth
- Succeeded by: Wilson Lumpkin

Member of the U.S. House of Representatives from Georgia
- In office March 4, 1833 – March 3, 1835
- Preceded by: Seat established
- Succeeded by: Seaton Grantland
- Constituency: At-large district
- In office October 1, 1827 – March 3, 1829
- Preceded by: Edward F. Tattnall
- Succeeded by: District abolished
- Constituency: 1st district
- In office March 4, 1821 – March 3, 1823
- Preceded by: Joel Crawford
- Succeeded by: George Cary
- Constituency: At-large district

Member of the Georgia House of Representatives
- In office 1824
- In office 1818–1819

Personal details
- Born: George Rockingham Gilmer; April 11, 1790 Lexington, Georgia, U.S.
- Died: November 16, 1859 (age 69) Lexington, Georgia, U.S.
- Party: Democratic-Republican; Whig
- Profession: Soldier, politician

George Rockingham Gilmer (April 11, 1790 – November 16, 1859) was an American politician. He served two non-consecutive terms as the 34th governor of Georgia, the first from 1829 to 1831 and the second from 1837 to 1839. He also served multiple terms in the United States House of Representatives.

== Early life ==
Gilmer was born near Lexington, Georgia, in what is present day Oglethorpe County (Wilkes County at the time of his birth). He attended a variety of backwood schools, including Moses Waddell's famous Willington Academy. He served as first lieutenant in the Forty-third Infantry Regiment from 1813 to 1815 in the campaign against the Creek during the War of 1812. He practiced law as a profession.

== Political career ==
Gilmer's career consisted of multiple, alternating, elected positions at the state and federal level. Of the two great Georgia political factions known as the Crawford men and the Clarke men, he favored Crawford.

He was elected to the Georgia House of Representatives in 1818, 1819, and 1824.

Gilmer was also elected to the U.S. House of Representatives in 1820, 1826, 1828 and 1832. Due to an oversight, he did not serve after the election in 1828, because he failed to accept the position within the legal time frame and the governor ordered a new election.

As governor of Georgia, Gilmer aggressively pursued Indian removal, laying claim to Federal assistance promised by the Compact of 1802.

He initiated the prosecution of Cherokee missionary Samuel Austin Worcester for violation of a law requiring all white persons residing within the Cherokee nation to obtain a license from the governor and to swear to uphold the laws of Georgia. Worcester was arrested in 1831 and sentenced to four years' hard labor. The Cherokee Nation hired a lawyer, William Wirt, and sued the state of Georgia in Cherokee Nation v. Georgia. This led to the United States Supreme Court decision Worcester v. Georgia, which struck down the Georgia statute imposing its laws on the Cherokees as violating the Treaty of Hopewell.

Backed by the Georgia militia and Governor Gilmer, the General Assembly dissolved the Cherokee government, annulled its laws, and passed an act authorizing Gilmer to take possession of the Cherokee lands in north Georgia.

The Cherokee issue was hotly debated in the gubernatorial campaign of 1831. Gilmer lost the election to Wilson Lumpkin. The state seized Cherokee gold mines and set up a land lottery system in 1832 to distribute Cherokee lands.

During his second term as Governor of Georgia, beginning in 1837, Gilmer supported and expedited the Federal government in the final removal of Indians from Georgia. This process came to be termed the Trail of Tears.

Gilmer was a presidential elector in 1836 for Hugh Lawson White and in 1840 for William Henry Harrison.

== Death and legacy ==
Gilmer died in 1859 in Lexington and is buried in the Presbyterian Church Cemetery in the same city. Gilmer County, Georgia is named for him.

== Notes ==
U.S. House of Representatives
Preceded by Joel Crawford	Member of the U.S. House of Representatives from Georgia's at-large congressional district March 4, 1821 – March 3, 1823	Succeeded by George Cary
Preceded by Edward F. Tattnall	Member of the U.S. House of Representatives from Georgia's 1st congressional district October 1, 1827 – March 3, 1829	Succeeded by Elected at large
Preceded by Newly established seat from congressional apportionment	Member of the U.S. House of Representatives from Georgia's at-large congressional district March 4, 1833 – March 3, 1835	Succeeded by Seaton Grantland
Political offices
Preceded by John Forsyth	Governor of Georgia; 1829–1831	Succeeded by Wilson Lumpkin
Preceded by William Schley	Governor of Georgia; 1837–1839	Succeeded by Charles J. McDonald
