= Joel Crawford (politician) =

American politician (1783–1858)

Joel Crawford (June 15, 1783 – April 5, 1858) was an American politician, soldier and lawyer. He served as a U.S. Congressman in the state of Georgia.

== Life and career ==
Crawford was born in Columbia County, Georgia. He attended the Litchfield Law School in Connecticut. After receiving admission to the state bar, he began practice in Sparta, Georgia. In 1811, Crawford moved to Milledgeville, Georgia.

During the Creek War, Crawford was a second lieutenant and aide-de-camp to Brigadier General John Floyd from 1813 to 1814. After the war, he returned to practicing law the in Milledgeville. In 1814, Crawford was elected to the Georgia House of Representatives and served in the body until 1817. In 1816, Fort Crawford was built in Mississippi Territory and possibly named for Crawford.

Crawford was elected to represent Georgia in the United States House of Representatives as a Republican during the 15th United States Congress. He won reelection to an additional term in the 16th Congress and served from March 4, 1817, to March 3, 1821.

In 1826, Crawford served as a commissioner to run the boundary line between Alabama and Georgia. He returned to Sparta in 1828 and served as a member of the Georgia Senate in 1827 and 1828. Crawford ran unsuccessful campaigns for Governor of Georgia in 1828 and 1831. Also in 1831, he was a delegate to the International Improvement Convention and in 1837 he was elected as a State commissioner to locate and construct the Western and Atlantic Railroad. Crawford died near Blakely, Georgia, on April 5, 1858, and was buried on his plantation in Early County, Georgia.

U.S. House of Representatives
Preceded by Bolling Hall	Member of the U.S. House of Representatives from Georgia's at-large congressional district March 4, 1817 – March 3, 1821	Succeeded by George Rockingham Gilmer
