= John Forsyth (politician) =

American politician (1780–1841)

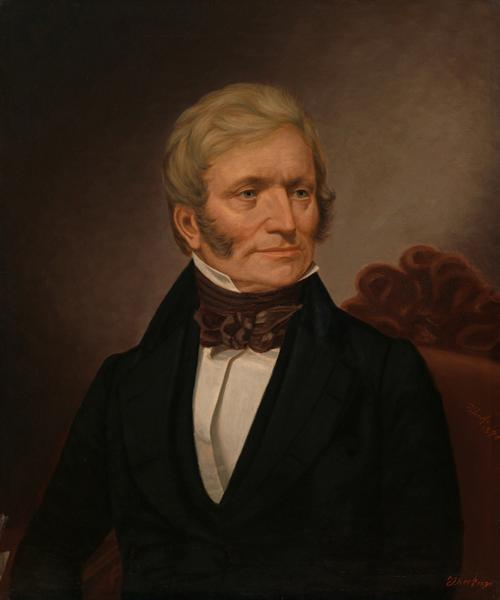

13th United States Secretary of State
- In office July 1, 1834 – March 4, 1841
- President: Andrew Jackson; Martin Van Buren
- Preceded by: Louis McLane
- Succeeded by: Daniel Webster

United States Senator from Georgia
- In office November 9, 1829 – June 27, 1834
- Preceded by: John M. Berrien
- Succeeded by: Alfred Cuthbert
- In office November 23, 1818 – February 17, 1819
- Preceded by: George Troup
- Succeeded by: Freeman Walker

33rd Governor of Georgia
- In office November 7, 1827 – November 4, 1829
- Preceded by: George Troup
- Succeeded by: George Gilmer

Member of the U.S. House of Representatives from Georgia
- In office March 4, 1823 – November 7, 1827
- Preceded by: Robert R. Reid
- Succeeded by: Richard H. Wilde
- Constituency: at-large district (1823–1827); 2nd district (1827)
- In office March 4, 1813 – November 23, 1818
- Preceded by: District established
- Succeeded by: Robert R. Reid
- Constituency: at-large district

5th United States Minister to Spain
- In office May 18, 1819 – March 2, 1823
- President: James Monroe
- Preceded by: George W. Erving
- Succeeded by: Hugh Nelson

12th Attorney General of Georgia
- In office 1808–1811
- Governor: Jared Irwin; David Mitchell
- Preceded by: John Hamil
- Succeeded by: Alexander Allen

Personal details
- Born: October 22, 1780 Fredericksburg, Virginia, U.S.
- Died: October 21, 1841 (aged 60) Washington, D.C., U.S.
- Party: Democratic-Republican (before 1825); Democratic (1825–1841)
- Relatives: Robert Forsyth (father), Fanny Forsyth (mother), Robert Forsyth (brother)
- Education: Princeton University (BA)

John Forsyth Sr. (October 22, 1780 – October 21, 1841) was a 19th-century American politician from Georgia. He represented the state in both the House of Representatives and the Senate, and also served as the 33rd governor of Georgia. As a supporter of the policies of President Andrew Jackson, Forsyth was appointed the 13th United States Secretary of State by Jackson in 1834, and continued in that role until 1841 during the presidency of Martin Van Buren. He also served as US Minister to Spain during the presidency of James Monroe.

== Early life ==
Forsyth was born in Fredericksburg, Virginia. In 1794, his father, Robert Forsyth, was the first United States federal law enforcement officer to be killed in the line-of-duty. He was an attorney who graduated from the College of New Jersey (now Princeton University) in 1799. He married Clara Meigs, daughter of Josiah Meigs, in 1801. One of his sons, John Forsyth, Jr., later became a newspaper editor.

== Political life ==
Forsyth served in the United States House of Representatives (1813–1818 and 1823–1827), the United States Senate (1818–1819 and 1829–1834), and as the 33rd governor of Georgia (1827–1829). He was the United States Secretary of State from 1834 until 1841. In this role he led the government's response to the Amistad case. He was a loyal follower of Andrew Jackson and opposed John C. Calhoun in the issue of nullification. Forsyth was appointed as Secretary of State in reward for his efforts. He led the pro-removal reply to Theodore Frelinghuysen about the Indian Removal Act of 1830. He supported slavery and was a slaveholder himself.

== Death and legacy ==
Forsyth died in Washington, D.C., and was buried in Congressional Cemetery. Forsyth County, Georgia; Forsyth, Georgia; Forsyth, Missouri; and Forsyth Park in Savannah are named for him. He died the day before his 61st birthday.

== In popular culture ==
- In the 1997 Steven Spielberg movie, Amistad, Forsyth was played by character actor David Paymer.

== Notes ==
Legal offices
Preceded by John Hamil	Attorney General of Georgia; 1808–1811	Succeeded by Alexander Allen
U.S. House of Representatives
New seat	Member of the U.S. House of Representatives from Georgia's at-large congressional district 1813–1818	Succeeded by Robert R. Reid
Preceded by Robert R. Reid	Member of the U.S. House of Representatives from Georgia's at-large congressional district 1823–1827	Districts established
Preceded by Jonathan Russell	Chair of the House Foreign Affairs Committee; 1823–1827	Succeeded by Edward Everett
Constituency reestablished	Member of the U.S. House of Representatives from Georgia's 2nd congressional district 1827	Succeeded by Richard Henry Wilde
U.S. Senate
Preceded by George Troup	U.S. Senator (Class 2) from Georgia; 1818–1819; Served alongside: Charles Tait	Succeeded by Freeman Walker
Preceded by John M. Berrien	U.S. Senator (Class 3) from Georgia; 1829–1834; Served alongside: George Troup, John King	Succeeded by Alfred Cuthbert
Preceded by Levi Woodbury	Chair of the Senate Commerce Committee; 1831–1832	Succeeded by William R. King
Preceded by Littleton Tazewell	Chair of the Senate Foreign Relations Committee; 1832–1833	Succeeded by William Wilkins
Preceded by Samuel Smith	Chair of the Senate Finance Committee; 1832–1833	Succeeded by Daniel Webster
Diplomatic posts
Preceded by George W. Erving	United States Minister to Spain; 1819–1823	Succeeded by Hugh Nelson
Political offices
Preceded by George Troup	Governor of Georgia; 1827–1829	Succeeded by George Gilmer
Preceded by Louis McLane	United States Secretary of State; 1834–1841	Succeeded by Daniel Webster
