= William H. Crawford =

American politician and judge (1772–1834)

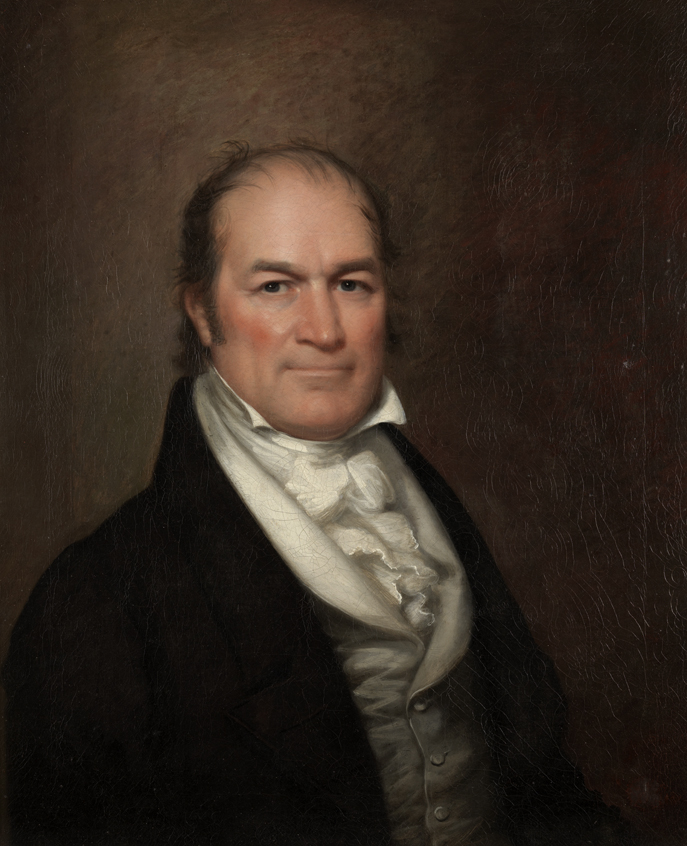
- Portrait, c. 1823

Georgia State Superior Court Judge
- In office 1827 – September 15, 1834
- Appointed by: George Troup

7th United States Secretary of the Treasury
- In office October 22, 1816 – March 6, 1825
- President: James Madison; James Monroe; John Quincy Adams
- Preceded by: Alexander Dallas
- Succeeded by: Richard Rush

9th United States Secretary of War
- In office August 1, 1815 – October 22, 1816
- President: James Madison
- Preceded by: James Monroe
- Succeeded by: John C. Calhoun

10th United States Minister to France
- In office March 23, 1813 – August 1, 1815
- President: James Madison
- Preceded by: Joel Barlow
- Succeeded by: Albert Gallatin

President pro tempore of the United States Senate
- In office March 24, 1812 – March 23, 1813
- Preceded by: John Pope
- Succeeded by: Joseph Varnum

United States Senator from Georgia
- In office November 7, 1807 – March 23, 1813
- Preceded by: George Jones
- Succeeded by: William Bulloch

Member of the Georgia House of Representatives
- In office 1803–1807

Personal details
- Born: William Harris Crawford; February 24, 1772 Amherst County, Virginia, British America
- Died: September 15, 1834 (aged 62) Lexington Depot, Georgia, U.S.
- Party: Democratic-Republican (1803–1828); Democratic (1828–1834)
- Spouse: Susanna Gerardine
- Children: 7, including Nathaniel

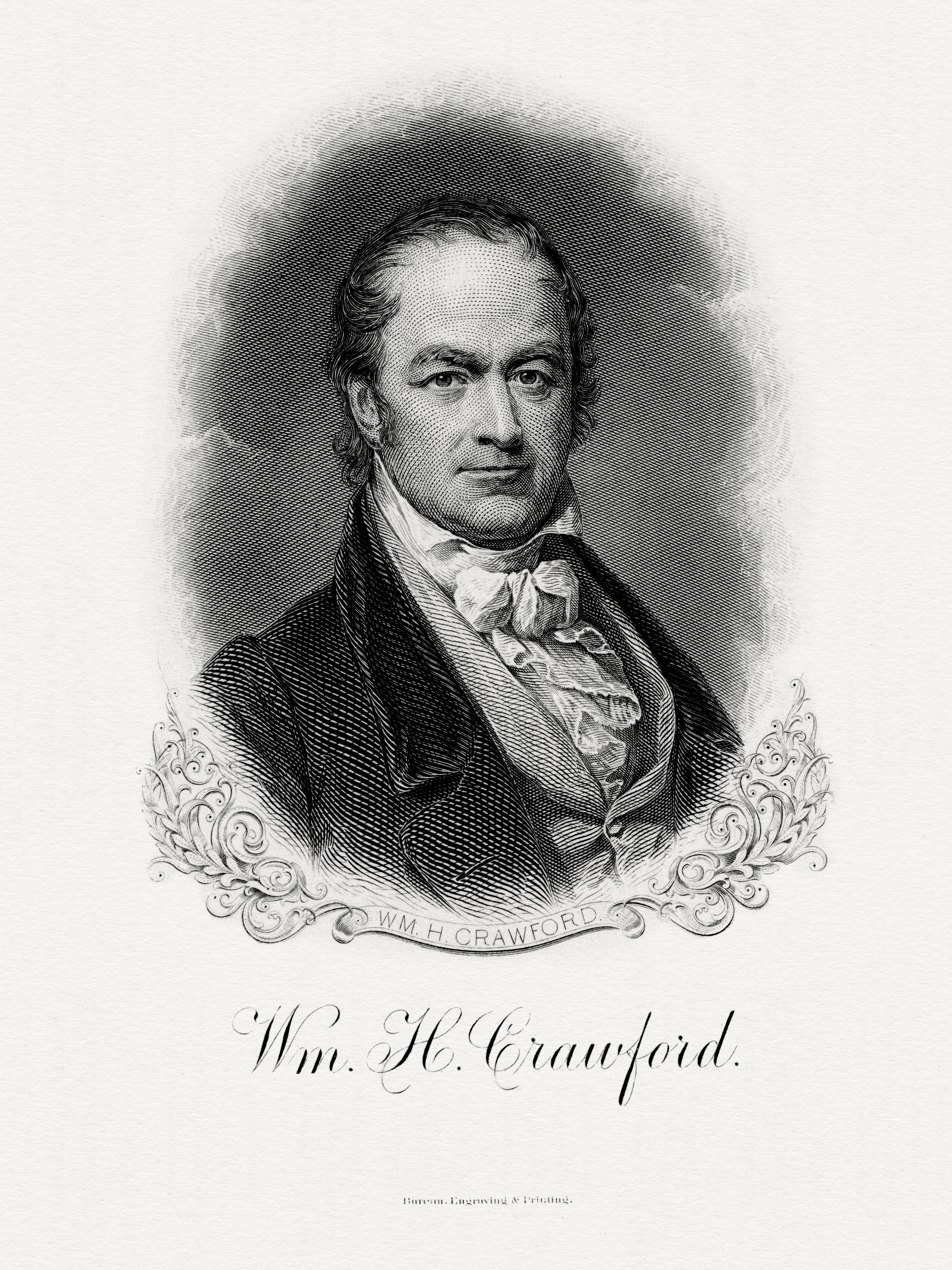
Bureau of Engraving and Printing portrait of Crawford as Secretary of the Treasury

William Harris Crawford (February 24, 1772 – September 15, 1834) was an American politician who served as U.S. Secretary of War and U.S. Secretary of the Treasury. He later ran for U.S. president in the 1824 election.

Born in Virginia, Crawford moved to Georgia with his parents at a young age, and he grew up to become one of the state’s most popular politicians. After studying law, Crawford won election to the Georgia House of Representatives in 1803. He aligned with the Democratic-Republican Party and U.S. Senator James Jackson. In 1807, the Georgia legislature elected Crawford to the U.S. Senate. After the death of Vice President George Clinton, Crawford's position as president pro tempore of the U.S. Senate made him first in the presidential line of succession from April 1812 to March 1813. In 1813, U.S. President James Madison appointed Crawford as the minister to France, and Crawford held that post for the remainder of the War of 1812. After the war, Madison appointed him to the position of Secretary of War. In October 1816, Madison chose Crawford for the position of Secretary of the Treasury, and Crawford would remain in that office for the remainder of Madison's presidency and for the duration of James Monroe's presidency.

Although Crawford suffered a severe stroke in 1823, he sought to succeed Monroe in the 1824 election. Because of his roots in Virginia, Crawford received the support of the Virginia dynasty, but ongoing concerns about his health along with a changing political landscape made it impossible for him to become the fourth consecutive Virginia native to hold the office of president. The Democratic-Republican Party splintered into factions, as several others also sought the presidency. No candidate won a majority of the electoral vote and so the U.S. House of Representatives chose the president in a contingent election. Under the terms of the U.S. Constitution, the House selected from the three candidates who received the most electoral votes, which left Andrew Jackson, John Quincy Adams, and Crawford in the running. The House selected Adams, who asked Crawford to remain as Treasury Secretary. Declining Adams's offer, Crawford returned to Georgia and accepted an appointment to the state superior court.

Crawford considered running in the 1832 presidential election for the presidency or the vice presidency but ultimately chose not to when fellow southerner Andrew Jackson sought a second term.

== Early life ==
Crawford was born on February 24, 1772, in the portion of Amherst County, Virginia, that later became Nelson County, the son of Joel Crawford and Fanny Harris, but at least one source has given his birthplace as Tusculum, a house whose site remains in Amherst County. He moved with his family to Edgefield County, South Carolina, in 1779 and to Columbia County, Georgia, in 1783. Crawford was educated at private schools in Georgia and at Richmond Academy in Augusta. After his father's death, Crawford became the family's main financial provider, and he worked on the Crawford family farm and taught school. He later studied law, was admitted to the bar in 1799 and began to practice in Lexington. Also in 1799, Crawford was appointed by the state legislature to prepare a digest of Georgia's statutes.

== State politics ==
He influenced Georgia politics for decades. In 1803, Crawford was elected to the Georgia House of Representatives as a member of the Democratic-Republican Party, and he served until 1807. He allied himself with Senator James Jackson. Their enemies were the Clarkites, led by John Clark. In 1802, he shot and killed Peter Lawrence Van Alen, a Clark ally, in a duel. Four years later, on December 16, 1806, Crawford faced Clark himself in a duel, and Crawford's left wrist was shattered by a shot from Clark, but he eventually recovered.

== U.S. Senate ==
In 1807, Crawford joined the 10th Congress as the junior U.S. senator from Georgia when the Georgia legislature elected him to replace George Jones, who had held the office for a few months after the death of Abraham Baldwin.

Crawford was elected President pro tempore of the Senate in March 1812 and, following the April 20, 1812, death of Vice President George Clinton, served as the permanent Presiding Officer of the Senate until March 4, 1813.

In 1811, Crawford declined to serve as Secretary of War in the Madison administration. In the Senate, he voted for several acts leading up to the War of 1812 and supported the entry into the war, but he was ready for peace: "Let it then be the wisdom of this nation to remain at peace, as long as peace is within its option."

Throughout his service in the Senate, Crawford was described as a member of the older more traditional wing of the Democratic-Republican Party, and he often focused on issues such as states' rights, which he supported.

== Minister to France ==
In 1813, President James Madison appointed Crawford as the U.S. minister to France during the waning years of Napoleon's First French Empire. Crawford served until 1815, shortly after the end of the Napoleonic Wars.

== Cabinet ==
Upon Crawford's return, Madison appointed him as Secretary of War on 1 August 1815. Crawford served more than a year in that post. He sought but narrowly failed to win the Democratic-Republican nomination for the 1816 presidential race. Madison appointed him Treasury Secretary on 22 October 1816. He remained in that post for the rest of Madison's term and both terms of President James Monroe, until 6 March 1825. While Treasury Secretary he initiated the Reform Bill of 1817.

== 1824 election ==
The Congressional Caucus nominated Crawford for the 1824 election. However, Crawford suffered a stroke in 1823 as a result of a lobelia prescription given to him by his physician. The Democratic-Republican Party was now split, and one of the splinter groups nominated Crawford. Despite improved health and the support of former Presidents Madison and Thomas Jefferson, he finished third in the electoral vote, behind Senator and General Andrew Jackson, hero of the Battle of New Orleans, and Secretary of State John Quincy Adams. In the subsequent contingent election, the House elected Adams President.

== Later life ==
Refusing Adams's request for him to remain at the Treasury, Crawford then returned to Georgia, where he was appointed as a state superior court judge. Crawford remained an active judge until his death, a decade later.

Crawford was nominated for vice president by the Georgia legislature in 1828 but withdrew after support from other states was not forthcoming. Crawford also considered running for vice president in 1832 but decided against it, in favor of Martin Van Buren. Crawford also considered running for president again in 1832 but dropped the idea when Jackson decided to seek a second term.

Crawford is interred in his own burial ground, adjacent to the former site of his mansion, Woodlawn, about half a mile west of the current Crawford city limit. Also buried there are his wife, who survived Crawford by 29 years, and nephew, William Crawford Dudley, who died at the age of 2.

== Societies ==
During the 1820s, Crawford was a member of the prestigious society Columbian Institute for the Promotion of Arts and Sciences, which had among its members former Presidents Andrew Jackson and John Quincy Adams.

Crawford also served as a Vice President in the American Colonization Society from its formation in 1817 to his death.

== Family ==
Crawford was a descendant of John Crawford (1600–1676), who had come to Virginia in 1643, but participated and died in Bacon's Rebellion. John's son David Crawford I (1625–1698), was the father of David Crawford II (1662–1762), and the grandfather of David Crawford III (1697–1766). David Crawford III married Ann Anderson in 1727 and had 13 children, including Joel Crawford (1736–1788).

His cousin, George W. Crawford, served as Secretary of War under President Zachary Taylor.

== Legacy ==
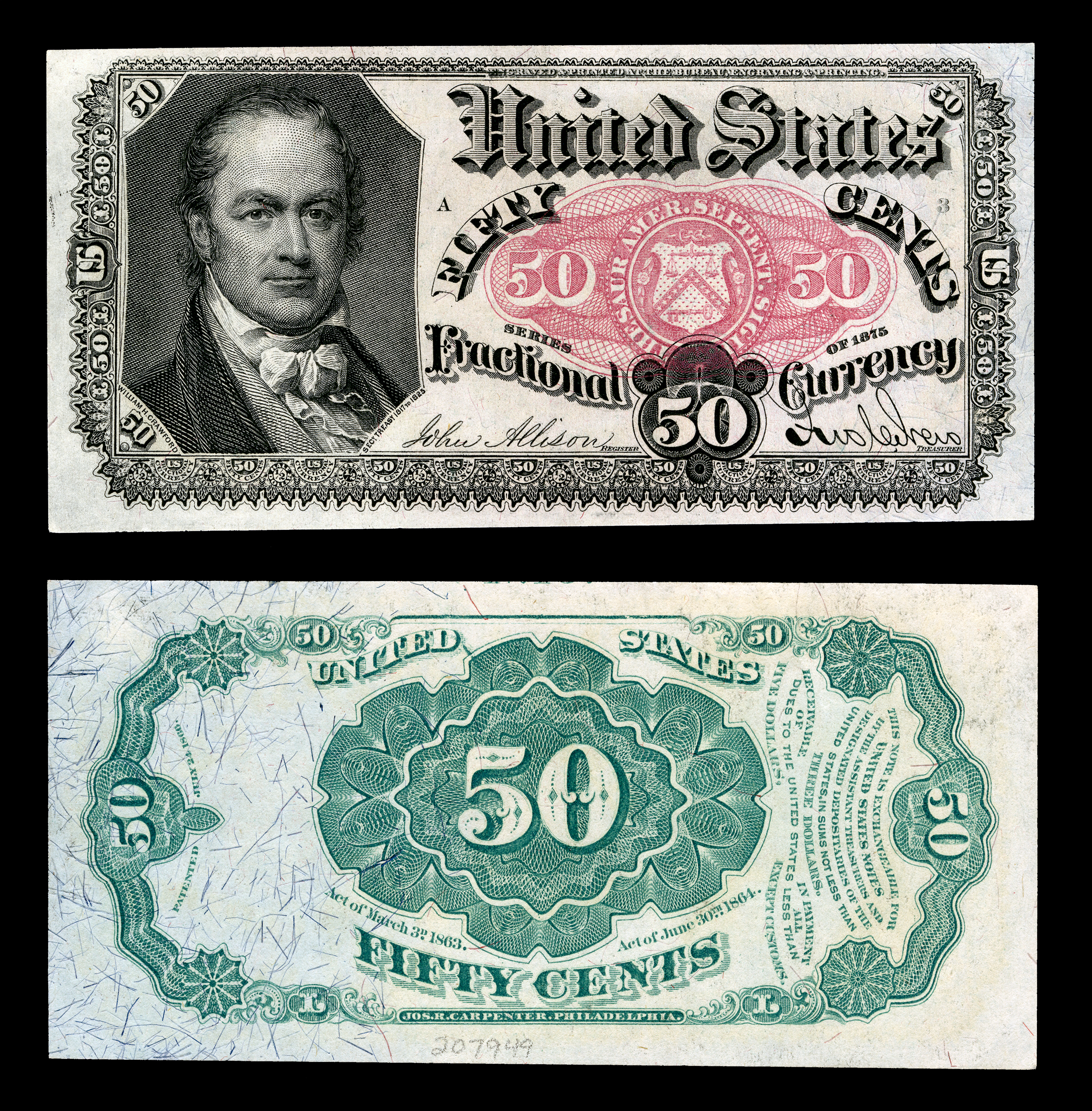
Crawford depicted on United States fractional currency

In 1875, Crawford appeared on the 50-cent bill.

The following places are named in his honor:

=== Cities and towns ===
- Crawford, Georgia
- Crawfordville, Georgia
- Crawfordsville, Indiana

=== Counties ===
- Crawford County, Arkansas
- Crawford County, Georgia
- Crawford County, Illinois
- Crawford County, Indiana
- Crawford County, Iowa
- Crawford County, Missouri
- Crawford County, Wisconsin

=== Forts ===
- Fort Crawford, Wisconsin

=== Squares ===
- Crawford Square, Savannah, Georgia

U.S. Senate
Preceded by George Jones	U.S. Senator (Class 2) from Georgia; 1807–1813; Served alongside: John Milledge, Charles Tait	Succeeded by William Bulloch
Honorary titles
Preceded by Samuel White	Baby of the Senate; 1807–1810	Succeeded by Jenkin Whiteside
Political offices
Preceded by John Pope	President pro tempore of the U.S. Senate; 1812–1813	Succeeded by Joseph Varnum
Preceded by Alexander Dallas; Acting	United States Secretary of War; 1815–1816	Succeeded by George Graham; Acting
Preceded by Alexander Dallas	United States Secretary of the Treasury; 1816–1825	Succeeded by Richard Rush
Diplomatic posts
Preceded by Joel Barlow	United States Minister to France; 1813–1815	Succeeded by Albert Gallatin
Party political offices
Preceded by James Monroe	Democratic-Republican nominee for President of the United States¹; 1824; Served alongside: John Quincy Adams, Henry Clay, Andrew Jackson	Party abolished
Notes and references
1. The Democratic-Republican Party split in the 1824 election, fielding four separate candidates.
