= George Troup =

American politician (1780–1856)

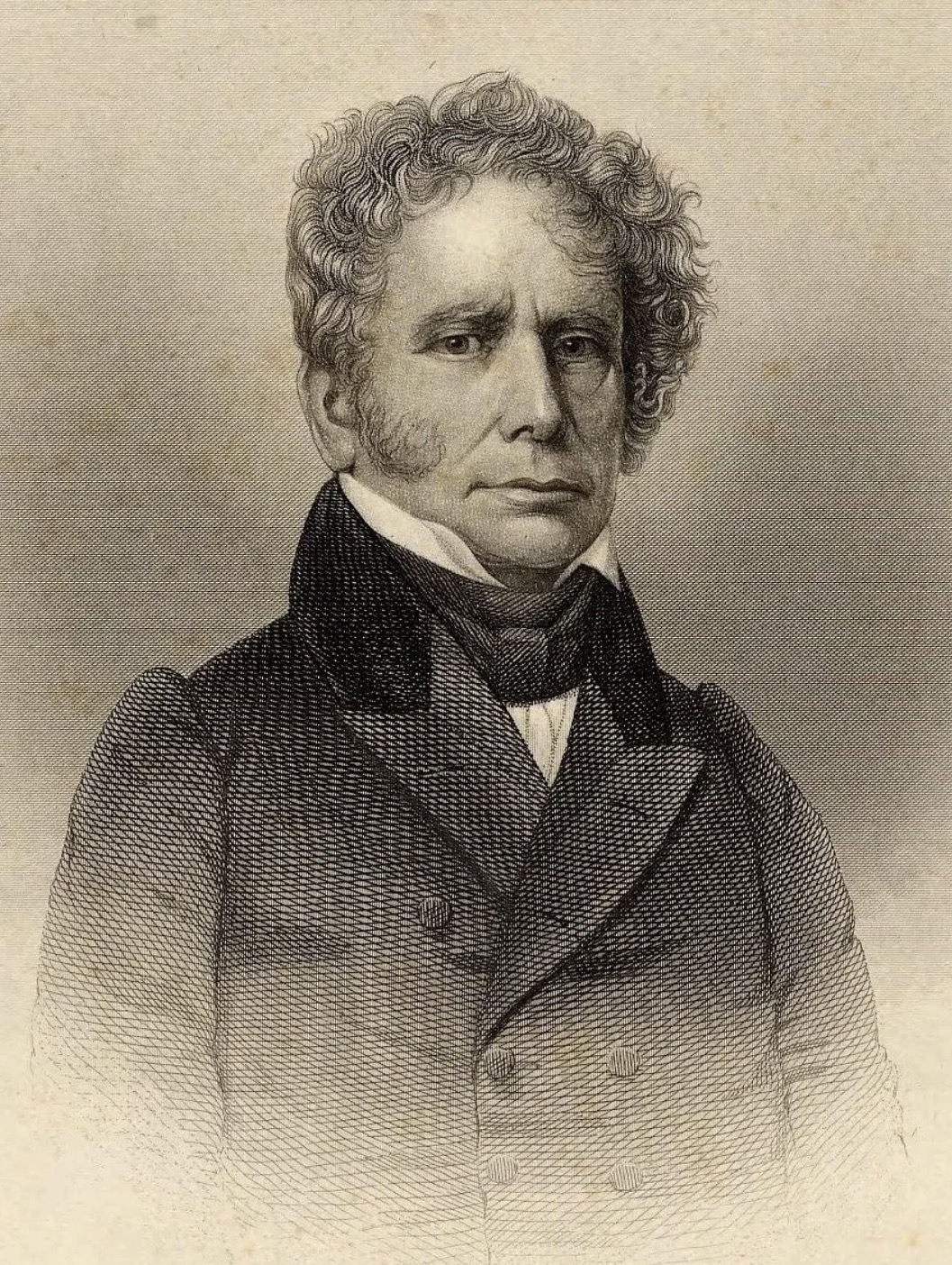
- Engraving by John Chester Buttre

United States Senator from Georgia
- In office March 4, 1829 – November 8, 1833
- Preceded by: Oliver H. Prince
- Succeeded by: John P. King
- In office November 13, 1816 – September 23, 1818
- Preceded by: William W. Bibb
- Succeeded by: John Forsyth

32nd Governor of Georgia
- In office November 7, 1823 – November 7, 1827
- Preceded by: John Clark
- Succeeded by: John Forsyth

Member of the U.S. House of Representatives from Georgia's at-large district
- In office March 4, 1807 – March 3, 1815
- Preceded by: David Meriwether
- Succeeded by: Wilson Lumpkin

Member of the Georgia General Assembly
- In office 1803-1805

Personal details
- Born: September 8, 1780 McIntosh Bluff, Alabama
- Died: April 26, 1856 (aged 75) Treutlen County, Georgia
- Party: Democratic-Republican; Democratic; Southern Rights (1852)
- Spouse(s): Anne St. Clair McCormick; Anne Carter
- Education: College of New Jersey

George Michael Troup (September 8, 1780 – April 26, 1856) was an American politician from the U.S. state of Georgia. He served in the Georgia General Assembly, U.S. House of Representatives, and U.S. Senate before becoming the 32nd governor of Georgia for two terms and then returning to the U.S. Senate. A believer in expansionist Manifest Destiny policies and a supporter of native Indian removal, Troup was born to planters and supported slavery throughout his career. Later in his life, he was known as "the Hercules of states' rights."

== Family life ==
Troup was born during the American Revolution at McIntosh Bluff, on the Tombigbee River in what is now Alabama (then a part of the Province of Georgia). He was the son of George Troup and Catherine McIntosh, the Georgia-born daughter of Captain John McIntosh, a British military officer and the chief of the McIntosh clan. (Catherine McIntosh was of the Chiefs of the MacGillivary clan lineage—she was a first cousin to Creek Chief Alexander McGillivray and aunt of Creek Chief William McIntosh.)

Troup was twice married and the father of six children. He primarily lived in Dublin in Laurens County. Troup's plantation, Valdosta (sometimes spelled Val d'Osta), was named after the Valle d'Aosta alpine valley in Italy. In turn, the town of Valdosta, Georgia was named for Troup's plantation. Troupville, Georgia was also named for him.

Troup graduated from the College of New Jersey (later Princeton University) in 1797. He read the law with an established firm and two years later was admitted to the bar in Savannah, Georgia.

== Early career ==
Troup entered politics, where he became a strong opponent of the Yazoo land scandal. A Democratic-Republican, Troup served one term as a state legislator (1803–1805). In 1806 he was elected to the U.S. House of Representatives. He was re-elected three times and served from 1807 to 1815. Along with other members of Congress, including Henry Clay of Kentucky and John C. Calhoun of South Carolina, Troup was a part of the nationalistic movement which originated the term War Hawks—members who supported the United States' entry into the War of 1812. Troup defended Calhoun on the House floor when Rep. John Randolph of Virginia attacked Calhoun, saying it was "the great mass of the House ... against the solitary gentleman from Virginia."

Troup was elected to the U.S. Senate, where he was supported by fellow wealthy plantation owners and served as chairman of the Senate Committee of Military Affairs.

== Governorship of Georgia ==
Georgia political force William H. Crawford hand-picked Troup as his candidate for governor in 1819. However, Troup twice lost to Crawford's bitter rival, John Clark, who was supported by frontier settlers. In 1823, Troup ran again, as Clark was no longer eligible, and won. He advocated the removal of the Creek Indians from western Georgia. Troup wanted to move them to the Western Territory of the Louisiana Purchase, an idea first proposed by Thomas Jefferson in 1803. In 1825, in Georgia's first popular election, Troup won by a razor-thin margin. He negotiated the controversial Treaty of Indian Springs on February 12, 1825, with his first cousin William McIntosh, a mixed-blood Creek chief. McIntosh and 49 other tribal leaders (predominantly from the Lower Creeks) ceded a large portion of Georgia, although they did not have the backing of the majority of the Creek Confederacy. He threatened an attack on Federal troops if they interfered with the treaty and challenged President John Quincy Adams, who conceded and allowed Troup to seize the remaining Creek land in Georgia. During Troup's tenure as governor, he also supported public education and the construction of new roads and canals. Despite the recentness of the War of 1812, Troup maintained that the United States should pursue a positive relationship with Great Britain. Troup always referred to the British in familial terms ("our cousins", "fraternal relations with England" our "sister nation") and believed that since Britain and America shared common roots, the two countries would "ultimately reunite in some form" although he believed the United States would and should "remain forever independent from, though no less loving towards, England." The European country remained most hostile to was France, Troup was very critical of both the French revolution, particularly the Reign of Terror as well as the subsequent Bourbon restoration government.

== Later career ==
Upon the expiration of his second term as governor, Troup returned to the Senate in 1829 as a Jacksonian Democrat, where he served on the Committee on Indian Affairs. He was a nominee for President of the United States on the Southern Rights Party during the 1852 United States presidential election.

== Death and memorialization ==
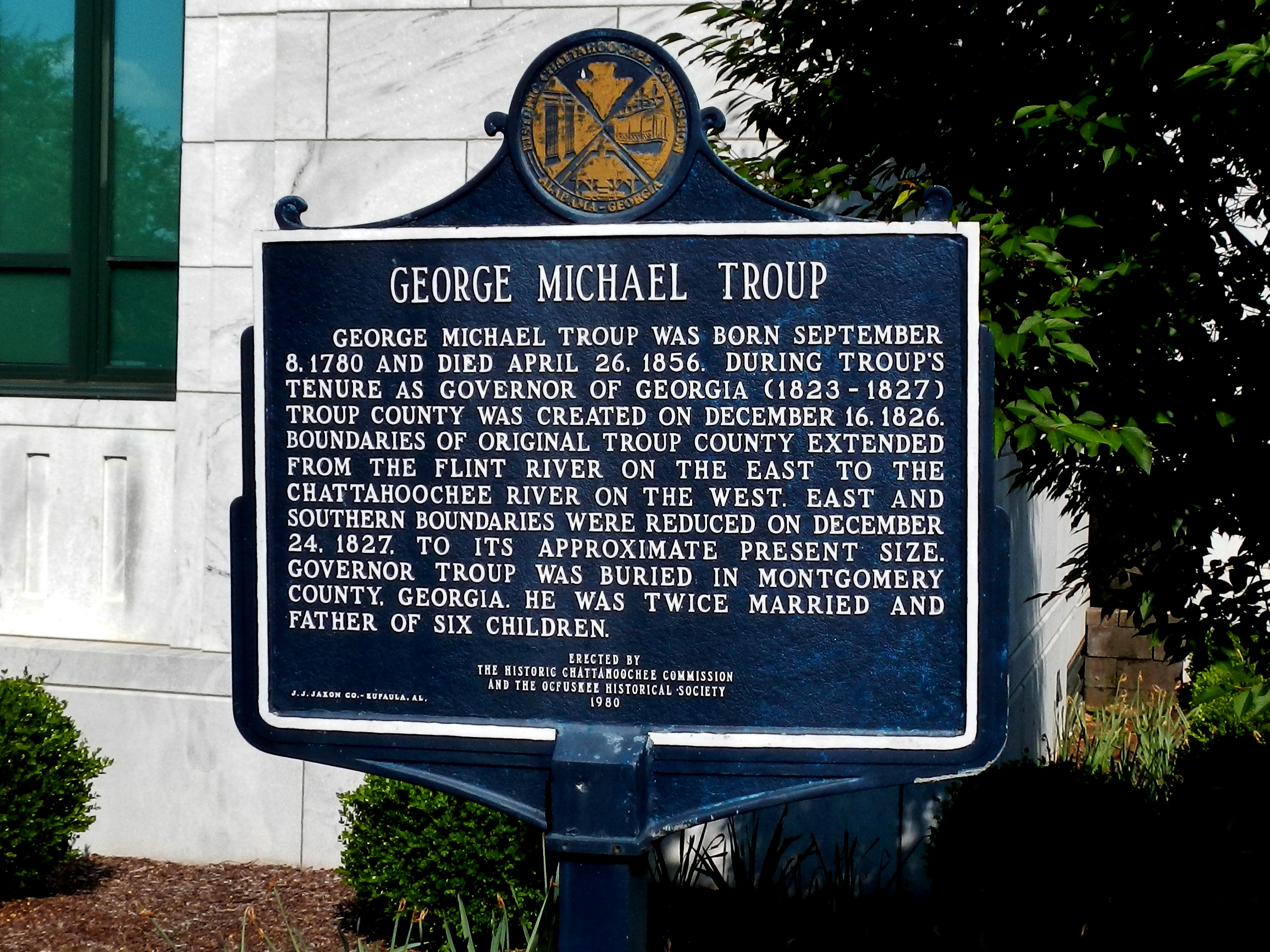
A historical marker outside the Old Troup County Courthouse in LaGrange, Georgia pays tribute to George M. Troup (erroneously referred to here as "George Michael Troup").

Troup died while visiting one of his plantations near the Oconee River in Montgomery County, Georgia (now Treutlen County). He was buried on the Rosemont plantation.

Troup County was created from former Lower Creek land in 1826 and named for him.

During the American Civil War, an Athens, Georgia battery was named the "Troup Artillery" in his memory.

== See also ==
- Hofwyl-Broadfield Plantation, owned by his brother

== Footnotes ==
- United States Congress. "George Troup (id: T000382)". Biographical Directory of the United States Congress.

U.S. House of Representatives
Preceded by David Meriwether	Member of the U.S. House of Representatives from Georgia's at-large congressional district March 4, 1807 – March 3, 1815	Succeeded by Wilson Lumpkin
U.S. Senate
Preceded by William W. Bibb	U.S. senator (Class 2) from Georgia; November 13, 1816 – September 23, 1818; Served alongside: Charles Tait	Succeeded by John Forsyth
Preceded by Oliver H. Prince	U.S. senator (Class 2) from Georgia; March 4, 1829 – November 8, 1833; Served alongside: John M. Berrien, John Forsyth	Succeeded by John P. King
Political offices
Preceded by John Clark	Governor of Georgia; 1823–1827	Succeeded by John Forsyth
