= 1828–29 United States House of Representatives elections =

House elections for the 21st U.S. Congress

- July 9, 1828 – October 5, 1829 (Note: These dates do not include a run-off ballot in Maine that ran into 1830.)

All 213 seats in the United States House of Representatives 107 seats needed for a majority
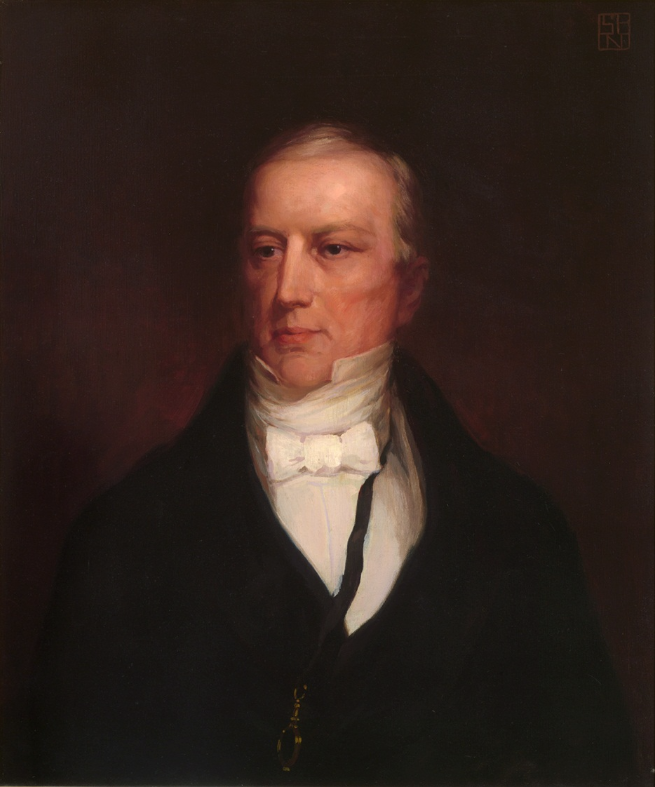

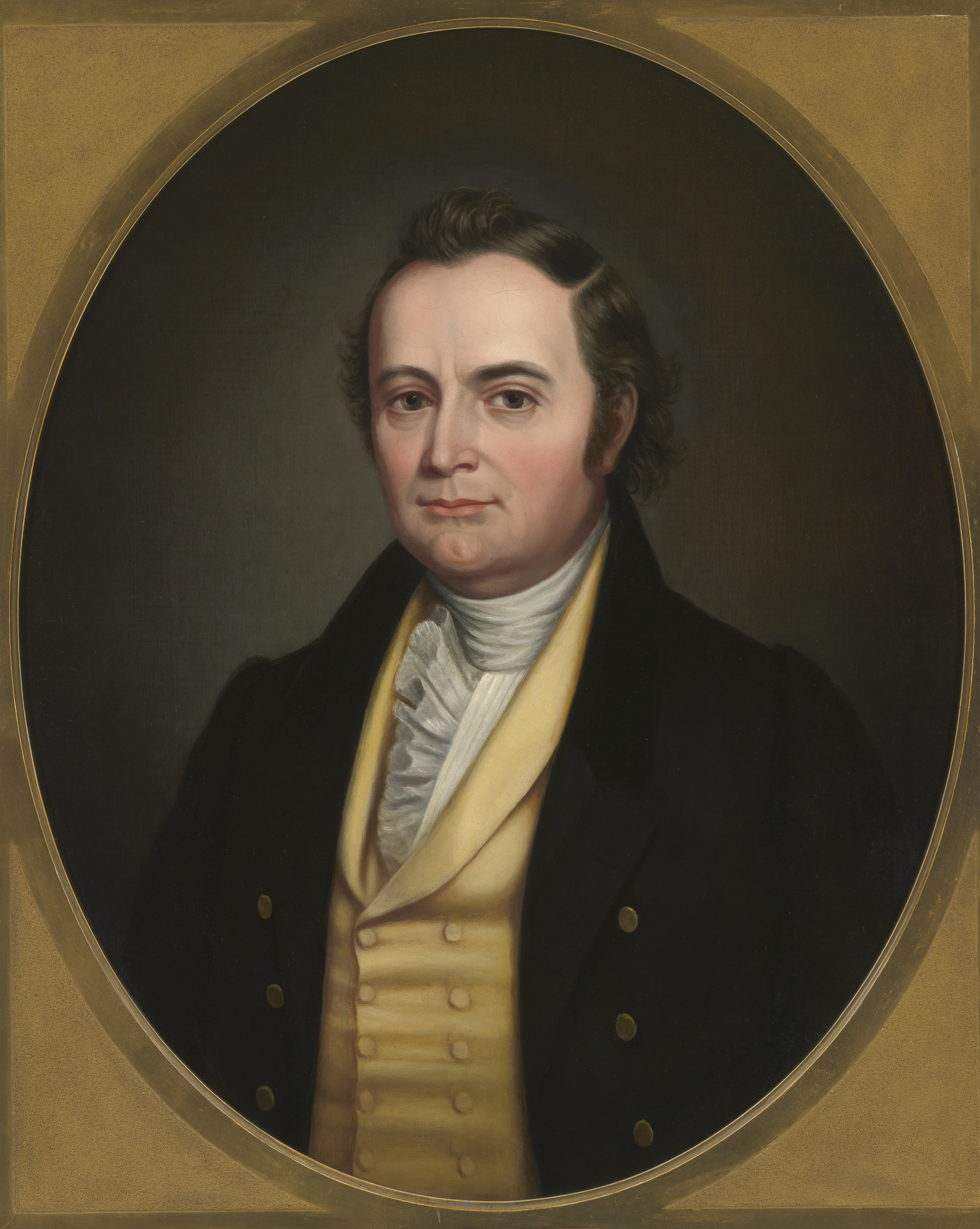
	Majority party	Minority party
Leader	Andrew Stevenson	John W. Taylor
Party	Jacksonian	Anti-Jacksonian
Leader's seat	Virginia 9th	New York 17th
Last election	113 seats	100 seats
Seats won	136 (Note: Both Dubin and Martis agree that there were 72 seats held by Anti-Jacksonians (or Adams Men) at the start of the 21st Congress; further, including the later filling of vacancies, both sources agree that there were ultimately 136 districts held by Jacksonians.)	72
Seat change	▲23	▼28
Popular vote	605,384	416,530
Percentage	54.95%	37.81%
	Third party
Party	Anti-Masonic
Last election	0 seats
Seats won	5
Seat change	▲5
Popular vote	38,013
Percentage	3.45%
- Results: Jacksonian hold Jacksonian gain Anti-Jacksonian hold Anti-Jacksonian gain Anti-Masonic gain Undistricted territory or split plural districts
Speaker before election
Andrew Stevenson
Jacksonian
Elected Speaker
Andrew Stevenson
Jacksonian

The 1828–29 United States House of Representatives elections were held on various dates in various states between July 9, 1828, and October 5, 1829. Each state set its own date for its elections to the House of Representatives before the first session of the 21st United States Congress convened on December 7, 1829. Elections were held for all 213 seats, representing 24 states.

They occurred while the Jacksonians soundly took control of the presidency, with Andrew Jackson's victory. The party greatly increased its majority in Congress. Outgoing President John Quincy Adams's unpopularity played a major role in the Jacksonian pickup, as did the perception of the Anti-Jacksonian Party as urban and elitist. Major increases in suffrage also heightened Jacksonian wins, as newly enfranchised voters tended to associate with Jacksonian principles. The Anti-Masonic Party, a single issue faction based on distrust of Freemasonry, became the first third party in American history to garner seats in the House.

== Election summaries ==
↓
72	5	136
Anti-Jacksonian	(Note: 5 Anti-Masons were elected.)	Jacksonian

State	Type	Date	Total seats	Anti-Jacksonian		Anti-Masonic		Jacksonian	
State	Type	Date	Total seats	Seats	Change	Seats	Change	Seats	Change
Louisiana	Districts	July 8–10, 1828	3	2	Steady	0	Steady	1	Steady
Illinois	At-large	August 4, 1828	1	0	Steady	0	Steady	1	Steady
Indiana	Districts	August 4, 1828	3	2	Steady	0	Steady	1	Steady
Missouri	At-large	August 4, 1828	1	0	▼1	0	Steady	1	▲1
Mississippi	At-large	August 4–5, 1828	1	0	Steady	0	Steady	1	Steady
Vermont	Districts	September 2, 1828	5	4	▼1	1	▲1	0	Steady
Maine	Districts	September 8, 1828	7	3	▼2	0	Steady	4	▲2
Georgia	At-large	October 6, 1828	7	0	Steady	0	Steady	7	Steady
Delaware	At-large	October 7, 1828	1	1	Steady	0	Steady	0	Steady
South Carolina	Districts	October 13–14, 1828	9	0	Steady	0	Steady	9	Steady
Ohio	Districts	October 14, 1828	14	6	▼6	0	Steady	8	▲6
Pennsylvania	Districts	October 14, 1828	26	1	▼5	1	▲1	24	▲4
New York	Districts	November 3–5, 1828	34	11	▼3	3	▲3	20	Steady
New Jersey	At-large	November 4, 1828	6	6	▲1	0	Steady	0	▼1
Massachusetts	Districts	November 7, 1828	13	13	Steady	0	Steady	0	Steady
Late elections (after the March 4, 1829, beginning of the term)
New Hampshire	At-large	March 10, 1829	6	0	▼5	0	Steady	6	▲5
Connecticut	At-large	April 29, 1829	6	6	Steady	0	Steady	0	Steady
Virginia	Districts	April 1829	22	6	Steady	0	Steady	16	Steady
Alabama	Districts	August 3, 1829	3	0	Steady	0	Steady	3	Steady
Kentucky	Districts	August 3, 1829	12	2	▼3	0	Steady	10	▲3
Tennessee	Districts	August 6–7, 1829	9	1	▲1	0	Steady	8	▼1
North Carolina	Districts	August 13, 1829	13	3	▼1	0	Steady	10	▲1
Rhode Island	At-large	August 27, 1829	2	2	Steady	0	Steady	0	Steady
Maryland	Districts	October 5, 1829	9	3	▼3	0	Steady	6	▲3
Total			213	72 33.8%	▼28	5 2.3%	▲5	136 63.8%	▲23

House seats
Jacksonian	63.85%
Anti-Jacksonian	33.80%
Anti-Masonic	2.35%

== Special elections ==
There were special elections in 1828 and 1829 to the 20th United States Congress and 21st United States Congress.

Special elections are sorted by date then district.

=== 20th Congress ===
District	Incumbent			This race	
District	Member / Delegate	Party	First elected	Results	Candidates
Mississippi at-large	William Haile	Jacksonian	1826 (special); 1826	Incumbent resigned September 12, 1828, having lost re-election to the next term. New member elected October 20, 1828 and seated December 8, 1828. Jacksonian hold. Winner had already been elected to the next term; see below.	▌ ✓ Thomas Hinds (Jacksonian) 92.9%; Others 7.1%
Arkansas Territory at-large	Henry W. Conway	None	1823	Incumbent died November 9, 1827. New member elected in 1827 or 1828 and seated February 13, 1828. Jacksonian gain.	▌ ✓ Ambrose H. Sevier (Jacksonian); [data missing]
New Jersey at-large (2 of the 6 seats elected on a general ticket)	George Holcombe	Jacksonian	1820	Incumbent died January 14, 1828. New member elected November 4, 1828 and seated December 1, 1828. Anti-Jacksonian gain. Winner was not a candidate for election to the next term on the same day; see below.	▌ ✓ Thomas Sinnickson (Anti-Jacksonian) 26.0%; ▌ ✓ James F. Randolph (Anti-Jacksonian) 25.9%; ▌James Parker (Jacksonian) 24.1%; ▌James Westcott (Jacksonian) 23.9%
New Jersey at-large (2 of the 6 seats elected on a general ticket)	Hedge Thompson	Anti-Jacksonian	1826	Incumbent died July 23, 1828. New member elected November 4, 1828 and seated December 1, 1828. Anti-Jacksonian hold. Winner was also elected to the next term; see below.	▌ ✓ Thomas Sinnickson (Anti-Jacksonian) 26.0%; ▌ ✓ James F. Randolph (Anti-Jacksonian) 25.9%; ▌James Parker (Jacksonian) 24.1%; ▌James Westcott (Jacksonian) 23.9%
New York 5	Thomas J. Oakley	Jacksonian	1826	Incumbent resigned June 1, 1828, to become a New York City Superior Court Judge. New member elected in 1828 and seated November 5, 1828. Jacksonian hold.	▌ ✓ Thomas Taber II (Jacksonian); [data missing]
Kentucky 2	Thomas Metcalfe	Anti-Jacksonian	1818	Incumbent resigned June 1, 1828, to become Governor of Kentucky. New member elected in 1828 and seated December 1, 1828. Anti-Jacksonian hold. Winner was not a candidate for the next term; see below.	▌ ✓ John Chambers (Anti-Jacksonian) 52.7%; ▌Nicholas D. Coleman (Jacksonian) 47.3%
Ohio 6	William Creighton Jr.	Anti-Jacksonian	1826	Incumbent resigned before December 19, 1828, to become judge to district court. New member elected December 2, 1828 and seated December 19, 1828. Anti-Jacksonian hold.	▌ ✓ Francis S. Muhlenberg (Anti-Jacksonian); [data missing]

=== 21st Congress ===
District	Incumbent			This race	
District	Member	Party	First elected	Results	Candidates
Maine 4	Peleg Sprague	Anti-Jacksonian	1825	Incumbent resigned in previous Congress. New member elected July 20, 1829 and seated December 7, 1829. Anti-Jacksonian hold.	First ballot (April 6, 1829): ▌Reuel Williams (Jacksonian) 41.0%; ▌George Evans (Anti-Jacksonian) 32.6%; ▌Jesse Robinson (Unknown) 14.9%; Scattering 5.11%; ▌Joseph Southwick (Unknown) 3.49%; ▌Timothy Boutiele (Unknown) 2.92%; Second ballot (July 20, 1829): ▌ ✓ George Evans (Anti-Jacksonian) 52.4%; ▌Reuel Williams (Jacksonian) 45.4%; Scattering 2.3%
Georgia at-large 1 of 7 seats	George R. Gilmer	Jacksonian	1820 [[1827 Georgia's 1st congressional district special election|1827 (special)]]	Incumbent failed to accept the position within the legal time frame. New member elected October 5, 1829 and seated December 7, 1829. Jacksonian hold.	▌ ✓ Henry G. Lamar (Jacksonian) 57.51%; ▌Thomas U. Charlton (Jacksonian) 42.49%
Pennsylvania 8 Plural district with 2 seats	George Wolf	Jacksonian	1824 (special)	Incumbent resigned in 1829 before the convening of Congress. New member elected October 13, 1829 and seated December 7, 1829. Jacksonian hold.	▌ ✓ Peter Ihrie Jr. (Jacksonian) 27.2%; ▌ ✓ Samuel A. Smith (Jacksonian) 25.1%; ▌Nathaniel B. Eldred (Jacksonian) 24.3%; ▌George Harrison (Jacksonian) 23.4%
Pennsylvania 8 Plural district with 2 seats	Samuel D. Ingham	Jacksonian	1812; 1818 (resigned); 1822 (special)	Incumbent resigned in March 1829 to become U.S. Secretary of the Treasury. New member elected October 13, 1829 and seated October 13, 1829. Jacksonian hold.	▌ ✓ Peter Ihrie Jr. (Jacksonian) 27.2%; ▌ ✓ Samuel A. Smith (Jacksonian) 25.1%; ▌Nathaniel B. Eldred (Jacksonian) 24.3%; ▌George Harrison (Jacksonian) 23.4%
North Carolina 5	Gabriel Holmes	Jacksonian	1825	Incumbent died September 26, 1829. New member elected December 2, 1829 and seated December 14, 1829. Jacksonian hold.	▌ ✓ Edward B. Dudley (Jacksonian); [data missing]
North Carolina 10	John Giles	Jacksonian	1829	Incumbent was elected August 13, 1829, to the term beginning March 4, 1829, but resigned from the seat without having served. New member elected December 2, 1829 and seated December 7, 1829. Jacksonian hold.	▌ ✓ Abraham Rencher (Jacksonian) 56.16%; ▌John Long (Anti-Jacksonian) 43.84%
Pennsylvania 16	William Wilkins	Jacksonian	1828	Incumbent resigned before qualifying. New member elected December 15, 1829 and seated December 30, 1829. Anti-Masonic gain.	▌ ✓ Harmar Denny (Anti-Masonic) 57.7&; ▌James S. Stevenson (Jacksonian) 42.3%
Virginia 10	William C. Rives	Jacksonian	1823	Incumbent resigned some time in 1829. New member elected in August 1829 and seated January 25, 1830. Jacksonian hold.	▌ ✓ William F. Gordon (Jacksonian) 58.1%; ▌Archibald Byrce (Independent) 23.9%; ▌Hugh Nelson (Unknown) 18.0%

== Alabama ==
Alabama elected its members August 3, 1829, after the term began but before Congress convened.

District	Incumbent			This race	
District	Member	Party	First elected	Results	Candidates
Alabama 1 "Northern district"	Gabriel Moore	Jacksonian	1821	Incumbent retired. Jacksonian hold.	▌ ✓ Clement C. Clay (Jacksonian) 52.0%; ▌Nicholas Davis (Anti-Jacksonian) 48.0%
Alabama 2 "Middle district"	John McKee	Jacksonian	1823	Incumbent retired. Jacksonian hold.	▌ ✓ R. E. B. Baylor (Jacksonian) 47.3%; ▌Seth Barron (Unknown) 27.5%; ▌Henry W. Ellis (Jacksonian) 25.2%
Alabama 3 "Southern district"	George W. Owen	Jacksonian	1823	Incumbent retired. Jacksonian hold.	▌ ✓ Dixon H. Lewis (Jacksonian) 41.4%; ▌Samuel W. Oliver (Unknown) 31.3%; ▌Francis Armstrong (Unknown) 27.3%

== Arkansas Territory ==
See Non-voting delegates, below.

== Connecticut ==
Connecticut elected its members April 29, 1829, after the term began but before Congress convened.

District	Incumbent			This race	
District	Member	Party	First elected	Results	Candidates
Connecticut at-large 6 seats on a general ticket	David Plant	Anti-Jacksonian	1827	Incumbent lost re-election. Anti-Jacksonian hold.	▌ ✓ Ralph I. Ingersoll (Anti-Jacksonian) 12.3%; ▌ ✓ Noyes Barber (Anti-Jacksonian) 11.3%; ▌ ✓ Ebenezer Young (Anti-Jacksonian) 9.8%; ▌ ✓ Jabez W. Huntington (Anti-Jacksonian) 9.4%; ▌ ✓ William L. Storrs (Anti-Jacksonian) 8.5%; ▌ ✓ William W. Ellsworth (Anti-Jacksonian) 8.3%; ▌David Plant (Jacksonian) (Note: Changed parties.) 8.1%; ▌John M. Niles (Jacksonian) 4.8%; ▌Andrew T. Judson (Jacksonian) 4.6%; ▌Orange Merwin (Jacksonian) 4.5%; ▌Elisha Phelps (Jacksonian) 3.7%; ▌John P. Trott (Jacksonian) 3.4%; ▌Hinman (Note: Source does not give full name.) (Jacksonian) 3.4%; ▌Roger Sherman (Unknown) 2.0%; ▌Daniel Burrows (Unknown) 1.9%; Others 3.4%
Connecticut at-large 6 seats on a general ticket	Elisha Phelps	Anti-Jacksonian	1818; 1820 (lost); 1825	Incumbent lost re-election. Anti-Jacksonian hold.	
Connecticut at-large 6 seats on a general ticket	Ralph I. Ingersoll	Anti-Jacksonian	1825	Incumbent re-elected.	
Connecticut at-large 6 seats on a general ticket	Orange Merwin	Anti-Jacksonian	1825	Incumbent lost re-election. Anti-Jacksonian hold.	
Connecticut at-large 6 seats on a general ticket	Noyes Barber	Anti-Jacksonian	1821	Incumbent re-elected.	
Connecticut at-large 6 seats on a general ticket	John Baldwin	Anti-Jacksonian	1825	Incumbent retired. Anti-Jacksonian hold.	

== Delaware ==
Delaware re-elected its sole member October 7, 1828.

District	Incumbent			This race	
District	Member	Party	First elected	Results	Candidates
Delaware at-large	Kensey Johns Jr.	Anti-Jacksonian	1827 (special)	Incumbent re-elected.	▌ ✓ Kensey Johns Jr. (Anti-Jacksonian) 52.3%; ▌James A. Bayard Jr. (Jacksonian) 47.7%

== Florida Territory ==
See Non-voting delegates, below.

== Georgia ==
Georgia returned to electing its members at-large for the 1828 election and elected its members October 6, 1828. Despite two retirements, the entire delegation remained Jacksonians.

District	Incumbent			This race	
District	Member	Party	First elected	Results	Candidates
Georgia at-large 7 seats on a general ticket	George R. Gilmer; Redistricted from the 1st district	Jacksonian	1820; 1827 (special)	Incumbent re-elected but failed to accept the position within the legal time frame and the governor ordered a new election.	▌ ✓ George R. Gilmer (Jacksonian) 11.1%; ▌ ✓ Richard Henry Wilde (Jacksonian) 11.0%; ▌ ✓ Wiley Thompson (Jacksonian) 10.2%; ▌ ✓ James M. Wayne (Jacksonian) 9.4%; ▌ ✓ Charles E. Haynes (Jacksonian) 8.8%; ▌ ✓ Thomas F. Foster (Jacksonian) 8.3%; ▌ ✓ Wilson Lumpkin (Jacksonian) 7.6%; ▌John A. Cuthbert (Jacksonian) 6.7%; ▌Thomas U. Charlton (Jacksonian) 6.2%; ▌James Meriwether (Jacksonian) 5.6%; ▌William Triplett (Jacksonian) 5.5%; ▌Charles Williamson (Jacksonian) 5.1%; ▌Daniel H. Braisford (Jacksonian) 4.5%
Georgia at-large 7 seats on a general ticket	Richard Henry Wilde; Redistricted from the 2nd district	Jacksonian	1814; 1816 (lost); 1824 (special); 1826 (lost); 1827 (special)	Incumbent re-elected.	
Georgia at-large 7 seats on a general ticket	Wiley Thompson; Redistricted from the 3rd district	Jacksonian	1820	Incumbent re-elected.	
Georgia at-large 7 seats on a general ticket	Wilson Lumpkin; Redistricted from the 4th district	Jacksonian	1814; 1816 (lost); 1826	Incumbent re-elected.	
Georgia at-large 7 seats on a general ticket	Charles E. Haynes; Redistricted from the 5th district	Jacksonian	1824	Incumbent re-elected.	
Georgia at-large 7 seats on a general ticket	Tomlinson Fort; Redistricted from the 6th district	Jacksonian	1826	Incumbent retired. Jacksonian hold.	
Georgia at-large 7 seats on a general ticket	John Floyd; Redistricted from the 7th district	Jacksonian	1826	Incumbent retired. Jacksonian hold.	

== Illinois ==
Illinois's sole member was re-elected August 4, 1828.

District	Incumbent			This race	
District	Member	Party	First elected	Results	Candidates
Illinois at-large	Joseph Duncan	Jacksonian	1826	Incumbent re-elected.	▌ ✓ Joseph Duncan (Jacksonian) 62.9%; ▌George Forquer (Anti-Jacksonian) 37.1%

== Indiana ==
Indiana elected its members August 4, 1828.

District	Incumbent			This race	
District	Member	Party	First elected	Results	Candidates
Indiana 1	Thomas H. Blake	Anti-Jacksonian	1826	Incumbent lost re-election. Jacksonian gain.	▌ ✓ Ratliff Boon (Jacksonian) 50.3%; ▌Thomas H. Blake (Anti-Jacksonian) 49.7%
Indiana 2	Jonathan Jennings	Anti-Jacksonian	1822 (special)	Incumbent re-elected.	▌ ✓ Jonathan Jennings (Anti-Jacksonian) 73.3%; ▌John H. Thompson (Jacksonian) 26.7%
Indiana 3	Oliver H. Smith	Jacksonian	1826	Incumbent retired. Anti-Jacksonian gain.	▌ ✓ John Test (Anti-Jacksonian) 55.8%; ▌Jon McCarty (Jacksonian) 44.2%

== Kentucky ==
Kentucky elected its members August 3, 1829, after the term began but before the new Congress convened.

District	Incumbent			This race	
District	Member	Party	First elected	Results	Candidates
Kentucky 1	Henry Daniel	Jacksonian	1827	Incumbent re-elected.	▌ ✓ Henry Daniel (Jacksonian) 66.6%; ▌Micajah Harrison (Anti-Jacksonian) 33.4%
Kentucky 2	Thomas Metcalfe	Anti-Jacksonian	1818	Incumbent resigned June 1, 1828, to become Governor of Kentucky. Jacksonian gain. Successor lost election to finish the current term, the next day.	▌ ✓ Nicholas D. Coleman (Jacksonian) 45.1%; ▌Adam Beatty (Anti-Jacksonian) 45.1%; ▌George M. Bedinger (Anti-Jacksonian) 8.3%; ▌James G. Leach (Jacksonian) 1.6%
Kentucky 3	James Clark	Anti-Jacksonian	1812; 1816 (resigned); 1825 (special)	Incumbent re-elected.	▌ ✓ James Clark (Anti-Jacksonian) 71.4%; ▌Matthew Flournoy (Unknown) 28.6%
Kentucky 4	Robert P. Letcher	Anti-Jacksonian	1822	Incumbent re-elected.	▌ ✓ Robert P. Letcher (Note: Numbers of votes missing or incomplete in source.) (Anti-Jacksonian)
Kentucky 5	Robert L. McHatton	Jacksonian	1826 (special)	Incumbent lost re-election. Jacksonian hold.	▌ ✓ Richard M. Johnson (Jacksonian) 55.2%; ▌Robert L. McHatton (Jacksonian) 44.8%
Kentucky 6	Joseph Lecompte	Jacksonian	1824	Incumbent re-elected.	▌ ✓ Joseph Lecompte (Jacksonian) 54.6%; ▌Thomas P. Wilson (Unknown) 45.4%
Kentucky 7	Thomas P. Moore	Jacksonian	1822	Incumbent retired. Jacksonian hold.	▌ ✓ John Kincaid (Jacksonian) 56.3%; ▌William B. Booker (Unknown) 43.7%
Kentucky 8	Richard A. Buckner	Anti-Jacksonian	1822	Incumbent retired. Jacksonian gain.	▌ ✓ Nathan Gaither (Jacksonian) 34.5%; ▌Martin Beaty (Anti-Jacksonian) 33.0%; ▌William Owens (Jacksonian) 15.1%; ▌Tunstall Quarles (Jacksonian) 14.5%; ▌Anderson (Jacksonian) 2.9%
Kentucky 9	Charles A. Wickliffe	Jacksonian	1822	Incumbent re-elected.	▌ ✓ Charles A. Wickliffe (Jacksonian) 53.6%; ▌Richard Rudd (Anti-Jacksonian) 46.4%
Kentucky 10	Joel Yancey	Jacksonian	1827	Incumbent re-elected.	▌ ✓ Joel Yancey (Jacksonian) 51.4%; ▌Francis Johnson (AJ?) 48.6%
Kentucky 11	Thomas Chilton	Jacksonian	1827 (special)	Incumbent re-elected.	▌ ✓ Thomas Chilton (Jacksonian) 64.7%; ▌James Crutcher (Anti-Jacksonian) 35.3%
Kentucky 12	Chittenden Lyon	Jacksonian	1827	Incumbent re-elected.	▌ ✓ Chittenden Lyon (Jacksonian)

== Louisiana ==
Louisiana elected its members July 8–10, 1828.

District	Incumbent			This race	
District	Member	Party	First elected	Results	Candidates
Louisiana 1	Edward Livingston	Jacksonian	1822	Incumbent lost re-election. Anti-Jacksonian gain.	▌ ✓ Edward D. White (Anti-Jacksonian) 58.6%; ▌Edward Livingston (Jacksonian) 41.4%
Louisiana 2	Henry H. Gurley	Anti-Jacksonian	1822	Incumbent re-elected.	▌ ✓ Henry H. Gurley (Anti-Jacksonian) 51.1%; ▌Lafayette Saunders (Jacksonian) 48.9%
Louisiana 3	William L. Brent	Anti-Jacksonian	1822	Incumbent retired. Jacksonian gain.	▌ ✓ Walter H. Overton (Jacksonian) 55.9%; ▌William L. Brent (Anti-Jacksonian) 44.1%

== Maine ==
Maine elected its members September 8, 1828. Maine required a majority vote for election, so the 5th district district election was settled on the second ballot on December 22, 1828, and the 6th district district election was settled on the sixth ballot on April 5, 1830, near the end of the next Congress.

District	Incumbent			This race	
District	Member	Party	First elected	Results	Candidates
Maine 1	Rufus McIntire	Jacksonian	1827 (special)	Incumbent re-elected.	▌ ✓ Rufus McIntire (Jacksonian) 66.0%; ▌Simon Nowall (Unknown) 7.5%; ▌Nathaniel Appleton (Unknown) 7.1%; ▌Samuel A. Bradley (Unknown) 5.8%; ▌Moses Emery (Unknown) 4.9%; ▌John Holmes (Anti-Jacksonian) 4.3%; Others 4.5%
Maine 2	John Anderson	Jacksonian	1824	Incumbent re-elected.	▌ ✓ John Anderson (Jacksonian) 76.2%; ▌Joseph Anderson (Unknown) 20.2%; Others 3.6%
Maine 3	Joseph F. Wingate	Anti-Jacksonian	1826	Incumbent re-elected.	▌ ✓ Joseph F. Wingate (Anti-Jacksonian) 75.2%; ▌John Ruggles (Jacksonian) 11.7%; ▌Samuel E. Smith (Jacksonian) 6.4%; ▌Albert Smith (Jacksonian) 3.5%; Others 3.3%
Maine 4	Peleg Sprague	Anti-Jacksonian	1824	Incumbent re-elected. Incumbent resigned March 3, 1829, when elected U.S. Senator, leading to a special election.	▌ ✓ Peleg Sprague (Anti-Jacksonian) 94.8%; Others 5.2%
Maine 5	James W. Ripley	Jacksonian	1826	Incumbent re-elected.	First ballot (September 8, 1828): ▌Reuel Washburn (Anti-Jacksonian) 49.96%; ▌James W. Ripley (Jacksonian) 43.7%; ▌Oliver Herrick (Unknown) 3.2%; ▌Samuel A. Bradley (Unknown) 2.4%; Others 0.8%; Second ballot (December 22, 1828): ▌ ✓ James W. Ripley (Jacksonian) 54.4%; ▌Reuel Washburn (Anti-Jacksonian) 44.6%; Others 1.0%
Maine 6	Jeremiah O'Brien	Anti-Jacksonian	1823	Incumbent lost re-election as a Jacksonian. Jacksonian gain.	First ballot (September 8, 1828): ▌Jeremiah O'Brien (Jacksonian) 48.0%; ▌Joshua W. Hathaway (Jacksonian) 31.4%; ▌Joshua Hall (Jacksonian) 10.1%; ▌Samuel Upton (Unknown) 9.0%; Others 1.4%; Second ballot (December 22, 1829): ▌Jeremiah O'Brien (Jacksonian) 40.77%; ▌Joshua W. Hathaway (Jacksonian) 28.99%; ▌Samuel Upton (Unknown) 22.83%; ▌Joshua Hall (Jacksonian) 4.44%; Others 4.12%; Third ballot (April 6, 1829): ▌Joshua W. Hathaway (Jacksonian) 20.73%; ▌John G. Deane (Unknown) 20.11%; ▌Leonard Jarvis (Jacksonian) 19.43%; ▌Samuel Upton (Unknown) 16.62%; ▌Jeremiah O'Brien (Jacksonian) 14.74%; ▌Philip Morrill (Unknown) 6.57%; Others 1.81%; Fourth ballot (September 14, 1829): ▌Leonard Jarvis (Jacksonian) 29.33%; ▌John G. Deane (Unknown) 27.62%; ▌Joshua W. Hathaway (Jacksonian) 20.28%; ▌Samuel Upton (Unknown) 17.11%; ▌Jeremiah O'Brien (Jacksonian) 2.98%; Others 2.69%; Fifth ballot (November 30, 1829): ▌Leonard Jarvis (Jacksonian) 32.11%; ▌John G. Deane (Unknown) 31.93%; ▌Samuel Upton (Unknown) 19.54%; ▌Samuel Williamson (Unknown) 14.80%; Others 1.62%; Sixth ballot (April 5, 1830): ▌ ✓ Leonard Jarvis (Jacksonian) 53.78%; ▌John G. Deane (Unknown) 19.14%; ▌Samuel Upton (Unknown) 16.66%; ▌Philip Morrill (Unknown) 6.26%; ▌Charles Lowell (Unknown) 2.05%; Others 2.12%
Maine 7	Samuel Butman	Anti-Jacksonian	1827	Incumbent re-elected.	▌ ✓ Samuel Butman (Anti-Jacksonian) 62.0%; ▌William Emerson (Unknown) 29.1%; ▌Samuel Whitney (Unknown) 7.4%; Others 1.6%

== Maryland ==
Maryland elected its members October 5, 1829, after the term began but before Congress convened.

District	Incumbent			This race	
District	Member	Party	First elected	Results	Candidates
Maryland 1	Clement Dorsey	Anti-Jacksonian	1824	Incumbent re-elected.	▌ ✓ Clement Dorsey (Anti-Jacksonian) 88.1%; Others 11.9%
Maryland 2	John C. Weems	Jacksonian	1826 (special)	Incumbent lost re-election. Anti-Jacksonian gain.	▌ ✓ Benedict J. Semmes (Anti-Jacksonian) 54.5%; ▌John C. Weems (Jacksonian) 45.5%
Maryland 3	George C. Washington	Anti-Jacksonian	1826	Incumbent re-elected.	▌ ✓ George C. Washington (Anti-Jacksonian) 100%
Maryland 4	Michael C. Sprigg	Jacksonian	1826	Incumbent re-elected.	▌ ✓ Michael C. Sprigg (Jacksonian) 56.0%; ▌William Price (Anti-Jacksonian) 44.0%
Maryland 5 Plural district with 2 seats	John Barney	Anti-Jacksonian	1824	Incumbent lost re-election. Jacksonian gain.	▌ ✓ Benjamin C. Howard (Jacksonian) 30.0%; ▌ ✓ Elias Brown (Jacksonian) 29.4%; ▌Peter Little (Anti-Jacksonian) 22.6%; ▌John Barney (Anti-Jacksonian) 18.0%
Maryland 5 Plural district with 2 seats	Peter Little	Anti-Jacksonian	1810; 1812 (lost); 1816	Incumbent lost re-election. Jacksonian gain.	▌ ✓ Benjamin C. Howard (Jacksonian) 30.0%; ▌ ✓ Elias Brown (Jacksonian) 29.4%; ▌Peter Little (Anti-Jacksonian) 22.6%; ▌John Barney (Anti-Jacksonian) 18.0%
Maryland 6	Levin Gale	Jacksonian	1826	Incumbent retired. Jacksonian hold.	▌ ✓ George E. Mitchell (Jacksonian) 53.5%; ▌James W. Williams (Anti-Jacksonian) 46.5%
Maryland 7	John Leeds Kerr	Anti-Jacksonian	1824	Incumbent lost re-election. Jacksonian gain.	▌ ✓ Richard Spencer (Jacksonian) 50.3%; ▌John Leeds Kerr (Anti-Jacksonian) 49.7%
Maryland 8	Ephraim K. Wilson	Anti-Jacksonian	1826	Incumbent re-elected.	▌ ✓ Ephraim K. Wilson (Anti-Jacksonian) 97.9%; Others 2.1%

== Massachusetts ==
Massachusetts elected its members November 7, 1828.

The majority requirement for election was met on the first ballot in all of the 13 districts.

District numbers vary between sources.

District	Incumbent			This race	
District	Member	Party	First elected	Results	Candidates
Massachusetts 1 "Suffolk district"	Benjamin Gorham	Anti-Jacksonian	1820 (special); 1827 (special)	Incumbent re-elected.	▌ ✓ Benjamin Gorham (Anti-Jacksonian) 78.6%; ▌William Ingalls (Jacksonian) 19.9%; ▌Henry See (Unknown) 1.5%
Massachusetts 2 "Essex South district"	Benjamin W. Crowninshield	Anti-Jacksonian	1822	Incumbent re-elected.	▌ ✓ Benjamin W. Crowninshield (Anti-Jacksonian) 54.6%; ▌Leverett Saltonstall (Anti-Jacksonian) 26.0%; ▌Ezra Mudge (Unknown) 11.7%; ▌Joseph S. Cabot (Jacksonian) 7.7%
Massachusetts 3 "Essex North district"	John Varnum	Anti-Jacksonian	1824	Incumbent re-elected.	▌ ✓ John Varnum (Anti-Jacksonian) 73.1%; ▌George Savory (Jacksonian) 16.7%; ▌Samuel Phillips (Unknown) 6.6%; ▌John Fitz (Unknown) 3.7%
Massachusetts 4 "Middlesex district"	Edward Everett	Anti-Jacksonian	1824	Incumbent re-elected.	▌ ✓ Edward Everett (Anti-Jacksonian) 74.2%; ▌S. M. Parker (Jacksonian) 11.6%; ▌S. Fiske (Unknown) 11.5%; Others 2.7%
Massachusetts 5 "Worcester South district"	John Davis	Anti-Jacksonian	1824	Incumbent re-elected.	▌ ✓ John Davis (Anti-Jacksonian) 90.4%; ▌Jonas Sibley (Unknown) 6.8%; ▌Sumner Boston (Unknown) 2.8%
Massachusetts 6 "Worcester North district"	John Locke	Anti-Jacksonian	1822	Incumbent lost re-election. Anti-Jacksonian hold.	▌ ✓ Joseph G. Kendall (Anti-Jacksonian) 52.7%; ▌John Locke (Anti-Jacksonian) 44.2%; Others 3.1%
Massachusetts 7 "Franklin district"	Samuel C. Allen	Anti-Jacksonian	1816	Incumbent lost re-election. Anti-Jacksonian hold.	▌ ✓ George Grennell Jr. (Anti-Jacksonian) 69.7%; ▌Elihu Hoyt (Anti-Jacksonian) 15.7%; ▌Samuel Dickinson (Anti-Jacksonian) 9.5%; ▌Samuel C. Allen (Anti-Jacksonian) 3.6%; Others 1.5%
Massachusetts 8 "Hampden district"	Isaac C. Bates	Anti-Jacksonian	1826	Incumbent re-elected.	▌ ✓ Isaac C. Bates (Anti-Jacksonian) 87.7%; ▌John Mills (Jacksonian) 7.9%; Others 4.4%
Massachusetts 9 "Berkshire district"	Henry W. Dwight	Anti-Jacksonian	1820	Incumbent re-elected.	▌ ✓ Henry W. Dwight (Anti-Jacksonian) 53.4%; ▌George N. Briggs (Anti-Jacksonian) 24.6%; ▌Nathan Willis (Jacksonian) 22.0%
Massachusetts 10 "Norfolk district"	John Bailey	Anti-Jacksonian	1822	Incumbent re-elected.	▌ ✓ John Bailey (Anti-Jacksonian) 75.9%; ▌William Ellis (Jacksonian) 13.9%; ▌Ebenezer Seaver (Jacksonian) 5.6%; Others 4.6%
Massachusetts 11 "Plymouth district"	Joseph Richardson	Anti-Jacksonian	1826	Incumbent re-elected.	▌ ✓ Joseph Richardson (Anti-Jacksonian) 52.6%; ▌Thomas P. Beal (Anti-Jacksonian) 47.4%
Massachusetts 12 "Bristol district"	James L. Hodges	Anti-Jacksonian	1826	Incumbent re-elected.	▌ ✓ James L. Hodges (Anti-Jacksonian) 81.2%; ▌Francis Baylies (Jacksonian) 7.8%; Others 10.9%
Massachusetts 13 "Barnstable district"	John Reed Jr.	Anti-Jacksonian	1812; 1816 (lost); 1820	Incumbent re-elected.	▌ ✓ John Reed Jr. (Anti-Jacksonian) 94.3%; Others 5.7%

== Michigan Territory ==
See Non-voting delegates, below.

== Mississippi ==
Mississippi elected its sole member at-large August 4–5, 1828.

District	Incumbent			This race	
District	Member	Party	First elected	Results	Candidates
Mississippi at-large	William Haile	Jacksonian	1826 (special)	Incumbent lost re-election. Jacksonian hold. Incumbent then resigned September 12, 1828, leading to a special election to finish the term, which was also won by the successor to the next term.	▌ ✓ Thomas Hinds (Jacksonian) 43.3%; ▌David Dickson (Jacksonian) 23.6%; ▌Adam L. Bingaman (Anti-Jacksonian) 17.3%; ▌William Haile (Jacksonian) 15.8%

== Missouri ==
Missouri elected its sole member August 4, 1828.

District	Incumbent			This race	
District	Member	Party	First elected	Results	Candidates
Missouri at-large	Edward Bates	Anti-Jacksonian	1820	Incumbent lost re-election. Jacksonian gain.	▌ ✓ Spencer D. Pettis (Jacksonian) 60.6%; ▌Edward Bates (Anti-Jacksonian) 39.4%

== New Hampshire ==
New Hampshire elected its members March 10, 1829, after the term began but before Congress convened.

District	Incumbent			This race	
District	Member	Party	First elected	Results	Candidates
New Hampshire at-large 6 seats on a general ticket	Ichabod Bartlett	Anti-Jacksonian	1822	Incumbent retired. Jacksonian gain.	▌ ✓ John Brodhead (Jacksonian) 9.3%; ▌ ✓ Thomas Chandler (Jacksonian) 9.2%; ▌ ✓ Jonathan Harvey (Jacksonian) 9.2%; ▌ ✓ Joseph Hammons (Jacksonian) 9.2%; ▌ ✓ John W. Weeks (Jacksonian) 9.2%; ▌ ✓ Henry Hubbard (Jacksonian) 9.2%; ▌Langley Boardman (Anti-Jacksonian) 7.8%; ▌Joseph Bell (Anti-Jacksonian) 7.7%; ▌Ezekiel Webster (Anti-Jacksonian) 7.7%; ▌Jothan Lord (Anti-Jacksonian) 7.6%; ▌David Barker Jr. (Anti-Jacksonian) 7.2%; ▌John Wallace (Anti-Jacksonian) 6.7%
New Hampshire at-large 6 seats on a general ticket	Jonathan Harvey	Jacksonian	1824	Incumbent re-elected.	▌ ✓ John Brodhead (Jacksonian) 9.3%; ▌ ✓ Thomas Chandler (Jacksonian) 9.2%; ▌ ✓ Jonathan Harvey (Jacksonian) 9.2%; ▌ ✓ Joseph Hammons (Jacksonian) 9.2%; ▌ ✓ John W. Weeks (Jacksonian) 9.2%; ▌ ✓ Henry Hubbard (Jacksonian) 9.2%; ▌Langley Boardman (Anti-Jacksonian) 7.8%; ▌Joseph Bell (Anti-Jacksonian) 7.7%; ▌Ezekiel Webster (Anti-Jacksonian) 7.7%; ▌Jothan Lord (Anti-Jacksonian) 7.6%; ▌David Barker Jr. (Anti-Jacksonian) 7.2%; ▌John Wallace (Anti-Jacksonian) 6.7%
New Hampshire at-large 6 seats on a general ticket	Titus Brown	Anti-Jacksonian	1824	Incumbent retired. Jacksonian gain.	▌ ✓ John Brodhead (Jacksonian) 9.3%; ▌ ✓ Thomas Chandler (Jacksonian) 9.2%; ▌ ✓ Jonathan Harvey (Jacksonian) 9.2%; ▌ ✓ Joseph Hammons (Jacksonian) 9.2%; ▌ ✓ John W. Weeks (Jacksonian) 9.2%; ▌ ✓ Henry Hubbard (Jacksonian) 9.2%; ▌Langley Boardman (Anti-Jacksonian) 7.8%; ▌Joseph Bell (Anti-Jacksonian) 7.7%; ▌Ezekiel Webster (Anti-Jacksonian) 7.7%; ▌Jothan Lord (Anti-Jacksonian) 7.6%; ▌David Barker Jr. (Anti-Jacksonian) 7.2%; ▌John Wallace (Anti-Jacksonian) 6.7%
New Hampshire at-large 6 seats on a general ticket	David Barker Jr.	Anti-Jacksonian	1827	Incumbent lost re-election. Jacksonian gain.	▌ ✓ John Brodhead (Jacksonian) 9.3%; ▌ ✓ Thomas Chandler (Jacksonian) 9.2%; ▌ ✓ Jonathan Harvey (Jacksonian) 9.2%; ▌ ✓ Joseph Hammons (Jacksonian) 9.2%; ▌ ✓ John W. Weeks (Jacksonian) 9.2%; ▌ ✓ Henry Hubbard (Jacksonian) 9.2%; ▌Langley Boardman (Anti-Jacksonian) 7.8%; ▌Joseph Bell (Anti-Jacksonian) 7.7%; ▌Ezekiel Webster (Anti-Jacksonian) 7.7%; ▌Jothan Lord (Anti-Jacksonian) 7.6%; ▌David Barker Jr. (Anti-Jacksonian) 7.2%; ▌John Wallace (Anti-Jacksonian) 6.7%
New Hampshire at-large 6 seats on a general ticket	Thomas Whipple Jr.	Anti-Jacksonian	1820	Incumbent retired. Jacksonian gain.	▌ ✓ John Brodhead (Jacksonian) 9.3%; ▌ ✓ Thomas Chandler (Jacksonian) 9.2%; ▌ ✓ Jonathan Harvey (Jacksonian) 9.2%; ▌ ✓ Joseph Hammons (Jacksonian) 9.2%; ▌ ✓ John W. Weeks (Jacksonian) 9.2%; ▌ ✓ Henry Hubbard (Jacksonian) 9.2%; ▌Langley Boardman (Anti-Jacksonian) 7.8%; ▌Joseph Bell (Anti-Jacksonian) 7.7%; ▌Ezekiel Webster (Anti-Jacksonian) 7.7%; ▌Jothan Lord (Anti-Jacksonian) 7.6%; ▌David Barker Jr. (Anti-Jacksonian) 7.2%; ▌John Wallace (Anti-Jacksonian) 6.7%
New Hampshire at-large 6 seats on a general ticket	Joseph Healy	Anti-Jacksonian	1824	Incumbent retired. Jacksonian gain.	▌ ✓ John Brodhead (Jacksonian) 9.3%; ▌ ✓ Thomas Chandler (Jacksonian) 9.2%; ▌ ✓ Jonathan Harvey (Jacksonian) 9.2%; ▌ ✓ Joseph Hammons (Jacksonian) 9.2%; ▌ ✓ John W. Weeks (Jacksonian) 9.2%; ▌ ✓ Henry Hubbard (Jacksonian) 9.2%; ▌Langley Boardman (Anti-Jacksonian) 7.8%; ▌Joseph Bell (Anti-Jacksonian) 7.7%; ▌Ezekiel Webster (Anti-Jacksonian) 7.7%; ▌Jothan Lord (Anti-Jacksonian) 7.6%; ▌David Barker Jr. (Anti-Jacksonian) 7.2%; ▌John Wallace (Anti-Jacksonian) 6.7%

== New Jersey ==
New Jersey elected its members November 4, 1828.

District	Incumbent			This race	
District	Member	Party	First elected	Results	Candidates
New Jersey at-large 6 seats on a general ticket	Lewis Condict	Anti-Jacksonian	1820	Incumbent re-elected.	▌ ✓ Lewis Condict (Anti-Jacksonian) 8.7%; ▌ ✓ Richard M. Cooper (Anti-Jacksonian) 8.7%; ▌ ✓ Isaac Pierson (Anti-Jacksonian) 8.7%; ▌ ✓ Samuel Swan (Anti-Jacksonian) 8.7%; ▌ ✓ James F. Randolph (Note: Won special election to the 20th Congress.) (Anti-Jacksonian) 8.6%; ▌ ✓ Thomas H. Hughes (Anti-Jacksonian) 8.6%; ▌William N. Jeffers (Jacksonian) 8.0%; ▌James Parker (Jacksonian) 8.0%; ▌Peter D. Vroom (Jacksonian) 8.0%; ▌John Clement (Unknown) 8.0%; ▌George Cassedy (Jacksonian) 8.0%; ▌Samuel Fowler (Jacksonian) 8.0%
New Jersey at-large 6 seats on a general ticket	George Holcombe	Jacksonian	1820	Incumbent died January 14, 1828. Jacksonian hold.	▌ ✓ Lewis Condict (Anti-Jacksonian) 8.7%; ▌ ✓ Richard M. Cooper (Anti-Jacksonian) 8.7%; ▌ ✓ Isaac Pierson (Anti-Jacksonian) 8.7%; ▌ ✓ Samuel Swan (Anti-Jacksonian) 8.7%; ▌ ✓ James F. Randolph (Anti-Jacksonian) 8.6%; ▌ ✓ Thomas H. Hughes (Anti-Jacksonian) 8.6%; ▌William N. Jeffers (Jacksonian) 8.0%; ▌James Parker (Jacksonian) 8.0%; ▌Peter D. Vroom (Jacksonian) 8.0%; ▌John Clement (Unknown) 8.0%; ▌George Cassedy (Jacksonian) 8.0%; ▌Samuel Fowler (Jacksonian) 8.0%
New Jersey at-large 6 seats on a general ticket	Isaac Pierson	Anti-Jacksonian	1826	Incumbent re-elected.	▌ ✓ Lewis Condict (Anti-Jacksonian) 8.7%; ▌ ✓ Richard M. Cooper (Anti-Jacksonian) 8.7%; ▌ ✓ Isaac Pierson (Anti-Jacksonian) 8.7%; ▌ ✓ Samuel Swan (Anti-Jacksonian) 8.7%; ▌ ✓ James F. Randolph (Anti-Jacksonian) 8.6%; ▌ ✓ Thomas H. Hughes (Anti-Jacksonian) 8.6%; ▌William N. Jeffers (Jacksonian) 8.0%; ▌James Parker (Jacksonian) 8.0%; ▌Peter D. Vroom (Jacksonian) 8.0%; ▌John Clement (Unknown) 8.0%; ▌George Cassedy (Jacksonian) 8.0%; ▌Samuel Fowler (Jacksonian) 8.0%
New Jersey at-large 6 seats on a general ticket	Samuel Swan	Anti-Jacksonian	1820	Incumbent re-elected.	▌ ✓ Lewis Condict (Anti-Jacksonian) 8.7%; ▌ ✓ Richard M. Cooper (Anti-Jacksonian) 8.7%; ▌ ✓ Isaac Pierson (Anti-Jacksonian) 8.7%; ▌ ✓ Samuel Swan (Anti-Jacksonian) 8.7%; ▌ ✓ James F. Randolph (Anti-Jacksonian) 8.6%; ▌ ✓ Thomas H. Hughes (Anti-Jacksonian) 8.6%; ▌William N. Jeffers (Jacksonian) 8.0%; ▌James Parker (Jacksonian) 8.0%; ▌Peter D. Vroom (Jacksonian) 8.0%; ▌John Clement (Unknown) 8.0%; ▌George Cassedy (Jacksonian) 8.0%; ▌Samuel Fowler (Jacksonian) 8.0%
New Jersey at-large 6 seats on a general ticket	Hedge Thompson	Anti-Jacksonian	1826	Incumbent died July 23, 1828. Anti-Jacksonian gain.	▌ ✓ Lewis Condict (Anti-Jacksonian) 8.7%; ▌ ✓ Richard M. Cooper (Anti-Jacksonian) 8.7%; ▌ ✓ Isaac Pierson (Anti-Jacksonian) 8.7%; ▌ ✓ Samuel Swan (Anti-Jacksonian) 8.7%; ▌ ✓ James F. Randolph (Anti-Jacksonian) 8.6%; ▌ ✓ Thomas H. Hughes (Anti-Jacksonian) 8.6%; ▌William N. Jeffers (Jacksonian) 8.0%; ▌James Parker (Jacksonian) 8.0%; ▌Peter D. Vroom (Jacksonian) 8.0%; ▌John Clement (Unknown) 8.0%; ▌George Cassedy (Jacksonian) 8.0%; ▌Samuel Fowler (Jacksonian) 8.0%
New Jersey at-large 6 seats on a general ticket	Ebenezer Tucker	Anti-Jacksonian	1824	Incumbent retired. Anti-Jacksonian hold.	▌ ✓ Lewis Condict (Anti-Jacksonian) 8.7%; ▌ ✓ Richard M. Cooper (Anti-Jacksonian) 8.7%; ▌ ✓ Isaac Pierson (Anti-Jacksonian) 8.7%; ▌ ✓ Samuel Swan (Anti-Jacksonian) 8.7%; ▌ ✓ James F. Randolph (Anti-Jacksonian) 8.6%; ▌ ✓ Thomas H. Hughes (Anti-Jacksonian) 8.6%; ▌William N. Jeffers (Jacksonian) 8.0%; ▌James Parker (Jacksonian) 8.0%; ▌Peter D. Vroom (Jacksonian) 8.0%; ▌John Clement (Unknown) 8.0%; ▌George Cassedy (Jacksonian) 8.0%; ▌Samuel Fowler (Jacksonian) 8.0%

== New York ==
New York elected its members November 3–5, 1828.

District	Incumbent			This race	
District	Member	Party	First elected	Results	Candidates
New York 1	Silas Wood	Anti-Jacksonian	1818	Incumbent lost re-election. Jacksonian gain.	▌ ✓ James Lent (Jacksonian) 52.3%; ▌Silas Wood (Anti-Jacksonian) 47.7%
New York 2	John J. Wood	Jacksonian	1826	Incumbent retired. Jacksonian hold.	▌ ✓ Jacob Crocheron (Jacksonian) 59.2%; ▌Peter W. Radcliff (Anti-Jacksonian) 40.8%
New York 3 Plural district with 3 seats	Churchill C. Cambreleng	Jacksonian	1821	Incumbent re-elected.	▌ ✓ Campbell P. White (Jacksonian) 24.0%; ▌ ✓ Gulian C. Verplanck (Jacksonian) 18.8%; ▌ ✓ Churchill C. Cambreleng (Jacksonian) 18.8%; ▌David Ogden (Anti-Jacksonian) 14.9%; ▌Thomas C. Taylor (Anti-Jacksonian) 14.6%; ▌Ebenezer Lord (Anti-Jacksonian) 9.0%
New York 3 Plural district with 3 seats	Gulian C. Verplanck	Jacksonian	1824	Incumbent re-elected.	▌ ✓ Campbell P. White (Jacksonian) 24.0%; ▌ ✓ Gulian C. Verplanck (Jacksonian) 18.8%; ▌ ✓ Churchill C. Cambreleng (Jacksonian) 18.8%; ▌David Ogden (Anti-Jacksonian) 14.9%; ▌Thomas C. Taylor (Anti-Jacksonian) 14.6%; ▌Ebenezer Lord (Anti-Jacksonian) 9.0%
New York 3 Plural district with 3 seats	Jeromus Johnson	Jacksonian	1824	Incumbent retired. Jacksonian hold.	▌ ✓ Campbell P. White (Jacksonian) 24.0%; ▌ ✓ Gulian C. Verplanck (Jacksonian) 18.8%; ▌ ✓ Churchill C. Cambreleng (Jacksonian) 18.8%; ▌David Ogden (Anti-Jacksonian) 14.9%; ▌Thomas C. Taylor (Anti-Jacksonian) 14.6%; ▌Ebenezer Lord (Anti-Jacksonian) 9.0%
New York 4	Aaron Ward	Anti-Jacksonian	1824	Incumbent retired. Anti-Jacksonian hold.	▌ ✓ Henry B. Cowles (Anti-Jacksonian) 51.0%; ▌Caleb Tompkins (Jacksonian) 49.0%
New York 5	Thomas J. Oakley	Jacksonian	1826	Incumbent resigned May 9, 1828, to become a judge of the superior court of New York City. Jacksonian hold.	▌ ✓ Abraham Bockee (Jacksonian) 58.5%; ▌Edmund H. Pendleton (Anti-Jacksonian) 41.5%
New York 6	John Hallock Jr.	Jacksonian	1824	Incumbent retired. Jacksonian hold.	▌ ✓ Hector Craig (Jacksonian) 55.7%; ▌Samuel J. Wilkin (Anti-Jacksonian) 44.3%
New York 7	George O. Belden	Jacksonian	1826	Incumbent retired. Jacksonian hold.	▌ ✓ Charles G. DeWitt (Jacksonian) 61.9%; ▌Lewis D. Bevier (Anti-Jacksonian) 27.3%; ▌John Bogardus (Anti-Masonic) 10.8%
New York 8	James Strong	Anti-Jacksonian	1818; 1821 (retired); 1822	Incumbent re-elected.	▌ ✓ James Strong (Anti-Jacksonian) 50.9%; ▌James Vanderpoel (Jacksonian) 49.1%
New York 9	John D. Dickinson	Anti-Jacksonian	1818; 1822 (lost); 1826	Incumbent re-elected.	▌ ✓ John D. Dickinson (Anti-Jacksonian) 51.6%; ▌George R. Davis (Jacksonian) 48.4%
New York 10	Stephen Van Rensselaer	Anti-Jacksonian	1822 (special)	Incumbent retired. Anti-Jacksonian hold.	▌ ✓ Ambrose Spencer (Anti-Jacksonian) 51.0%; ▌Charles E. Dudley (Jacksonian) 47.7%; ▌George Merchant (Anti-Masonic) 1.2%
New York 11	Selah R. Hobbie	Jacksonian	1826	Incumbent retired. Jacksonian hold.	▌ ✓ Perkins King (Jacksonian) 61.6%; ▌Jacob Haight (Anti-Jacksonian) 38.4%
New York 12	John I. De Graff	Jacksonian	1826	Incumbent retired. Jacksonian hold.	▌ ✓ Peter I. Borst (Jacksonian) 57.5%; ▌Jacob Livingston (Anti-Jacksonian) 42.5%
New York 13	Samuel Chase	Anti-Jacksonian	1826	Incumbent retired. Jacksonian gain.	▌ ✓ William G. Angel (Jacksonian) 55.7%; ▌Erastus Crafts (Anti-Jacksonian) 44.3%
New York 14	Henry R. Storrs	Anti-Jacksonian	1816; 1821 (retired); 1822	Incumbent re-elected.	▌ ✓ Henry R. Storrs (Anti-Jacksonian) 51.1%; ▌Greene C. Bronson (Jacksonian) 48.9%
New York 15	Michael Hoffman	Jacksonian	1824	Incumbent re-elected.	▌ ✓ Michael Hoffman (Jacksonian) 100%
New York 16	Henry Markell	Anti-Jacksonian	1824	Incumbent retired. Anti-Jacksonian hold.	▌ ✓ Benedict Arnold (Anti-Jacksonian) 52.9%; ▌William I. Dodge (Jacksonian) 47.1%
New York 17	John W. Taylor	Anti-Jacksonian	1812	Incumbent re-elected.	▌ ✓ John W. Taylor (Anti-Jacksonian) 54.9%; ▌John Cramer (Jacksonian) 45.1%
New York 18	Henry C. Martindale	Anti-Jacksonian	1822	Incumbent re-elected.	▌ ✓ Henry C. Martindale (Anti-Jacksonian) 58.0%; ▌John Willard (Jacksonian) 42.0%
New York 19	Richard Keese	Jacksonian	1826	Incumbent retired. Anti-Jacksonian gain.	▌ ✓ Isaac Finch (Anti-Jacksonian) 48.0%; ▌William Hogan (Jacksonian) 44.7%; ▌John McLean (Anti-Masonic) 4.1%; ▌John Cameron (Unknown) 3.3%
New York 20 Plural district with 2 seats	Rudolph Bunner	Jacksonian	1826	Incumbent retired. Anti-Jacksonian gain.	▌ ✓ Joseph Hawkins (Anti-Jacksonian) 25.5%; ▌ ✓ George Fisher (Note: Silas Wright Jr. (Jacksonian) successfully contested the election of George Fisher (Anti-Jacksonian); but Wright never claimed the seat, and resigned, without serving, on March 9, 1830. See note at bottom of the New York 'Complete returns' section for further details.) (Anti-Jacksonian) 25.1%; ▌Silas Wright Jr. (Jacksonian) 25.1%; ▌Perley Keyes (Jacksonian) 24.2%
New York 20 Plural district with 2 seats	Silas Wright Jr.	Jacksonian	1826	Incumbent lost re-election. Anti-Jacksonian gain. The losing incumbent later successfully contested the election but Wright never claimed the seat and resigned without serving on March 9, 1830.	▌ ✓ Joseph Hawkins (Anti-Jacksonian) 25.5%; ▌ ✓ George Fisher (Anti-Jacksonian) 25.1%; ▌Silas Wright Jr. (Jacksonian) 25.1%; ▌Perley Keyes (Jacksonian) 24.2%
New York 21	John C. Clark	Jacksonian	1826	Incumbent retired. Jacksonian hold.	▌ ✓ Robert Monell (Jacksonian) 63.6%; ▌Tilly Lynde (Unknown) 36.4%
New York 22	John G. Stower	Jacksonian	1824	Incumbent lost re-election. Anti-Jacksonian gain.	▌ ✓ Thomas Beekman (Anti-Jacksonian) 53.4%; ▌John G. Stower (Jacksonian) 46.6%
New York 23	Jonas Earll Jr.	Jacksonian	1826	Incumbent re-elected.	▌ ✓ Jonas Earll Jr. (Jacksonian) 50.4%; ▌Daniel Kellogg (Anti-Jacksonian) 44.6%; ▌Parson P. Shipman (Unknown) 5.0%
New York 24	Nathaniel Garrow	Jacksonian	1826	Incumbent retired. Jacksonian hold.	▌ ✓ Gershom Powers (Jacksonian) 61.6%; ▌Daniel Kellogg (Anti-Jacksonian) 24.8%; ▌Moses Dixon (Anti-Masonic) 13.6%
New York 25	David Woodcock	Anti-Jacksonian	1821; 1824 (lost); 1826	Incumbent lost re-election. Jacksonian gain.	▌ ✓ Thomas Maxwell (Jacksonian) 60.1%; ▌David Woodcock (Anti-Jacksonian) 39.9%
New York 26 Plural district with 2 seats	Dudley Marvin	Anti-Jacksonian	1822	Incumbent lost re-election. Anti-Masonic gain.	▌ ✓ Robert S. Rose (Anti-Masonic) 26.4%; ▌ ✓ Jehiel H. Halsey (Jacksonian) 21.4%; ▌Phineas P. Bates (Jacksonian) 20.8%; ▌Dudley Marvin (Anti-Jacksonian) 16.1%; ▌Israel J. Richardson (Anti-Masonic) 15.3%
New York 26 Plural district with 2 seats	John Maynard	Anti-Jacksonian	1826	Incumbent retired. Jacksonian gain.	▌ ✓ Robert S. Rose (Anti-Masonic) 26.4%; ▌ ✓ Jehiel H. Halsey (Jacksonian) 21.4%; ▌Phineas P. Bates (Jacksonian) 20.8%; ▌Dudley Marvin (Anti-Jacksonian) 16.1%; ▌Israel J. Richardson (Anti-Masonic) 15.3%
New York 27	Daniel D. Barnard	Anti-Jacksonian	1826	Incumbent lost re-election. Anti-Masonic gain.	▌ ✓ Timothy Childs (Anti-Masonic) 54.6%; ▌Addison Gardiner (Jacksonian) 36.0%; ▌Daniel D. Barnard (Anti-Jacksonian) 9.4%
New York 28	John Magee	Jacksonian	1826	Incumbent re-elected.	▌ ✓ John Magee (Jacksonian) 55.2%; ▌Timothy H. Porter (Anti-Jacksonian) 44.8%
New York 29	Phineas L. Tracy	Anti-Jacksonian	1827 (special)	Incumbent re-elected to a new party. Anti-Masonic gain.	✓ Phineas L. Tracy (Anti-Masonic) 68.9%; ▌Heman J. Redfield (Jacksonian) 31.1%
New York 30	Daniel G. Garnsey	Jacksonian	1824	Incumbent lost re-election as Anti-Masonic. Jacksonian hold.	▌ ✓ Ebenezer F. Norton (Jacksonian) 45.0%; ▌John Birdsall (Jacksonian) 24.3%; ▌John G. Camp (Anti-Jacksonian) 17.3%; ▌Daniel G. Garnsey (Anti-Masonic) 13.4%

== North Carolina ==
North Carolina elected its members August 13, 1829, after the term began but before Congress convened.

District	Incumbent			This race	
District	Member	Party	First elected	Results	Candidates
North Carolina 1	Lemuel Sawyer	Jacksonian	1806; 1812 (lost); 1817; 1823 (lost); 1825	Incumbent lost re-election. Anti-Jacksonian gain.	▌ ✓ William Biddle Shepard (Anti-Jacksonian) 54.0%; ▌Lemuel Sawyer (Jacksonian) 46.0%
North Carolina 2	Willis Alston	Jacksonian	1798; 1815 (retired); 1825	Incumbent re-elected.	▌ ✓ Willis Alston (Jacksonian) 93.9%; ▌George E. Spruill (Unknown) 6.1%
North Carolina 3	Thomas H. Hall	Jacksonian	1817; 1825 (lost); 1827	Incumbent re-elected.	▌ ✓ Thomas H. Hall (Jacksonian) 93.5%; ▌Richard Hines (Jacksonian) 3.9%; ▌William A. Blount (Jacksonian) 2.6%
North Carolina 4	John H. Bryan	Anti-Jacksonian	1825	Incumbent retired. Jacksonian gain.	▌ ✓ Jesse Speight (Jacksonian) 64.5%; ▌Thomas H. Daves (Jacksonian) 26.2%; ▌James Manney (Anti-Jacksonian) 9.4%
North Carolina 5	Gabriel Holmes	Jacksonian	1825	Incumbent re-elected. Incumbent later died September 26, 1829, and was replaced in a special election.	▌ ✓ Gabriel Holmes (Jacksonian) 52.2%; ▌Edward B. Dudley (Note: Won subsequent special election.) (Jacksonian) 47.8%
North Carolina 6	Daniel Turner	Jacksonian	1827	Incumbent retired. Jacksonian hold.	▌ ✓ Robert Potter (Jacksonian) 83.9%; ▌Samuel Hillman (Anti-Jacksonian) 12.5%; ▌W. Joyner (Unknown) 3.6%
North Carolina 7	John Culpepper	Anti-Jacksonian	1806; 1808 (contested); 1808 (special); 1813; 1816 (lost); 1819; 1821 (lost); 1823; 1825 (lost); 1827	Incumbent retired. Anti-Jacksonian hold.	▌ ✓ Edmund Deberry (Anti-Jacksonian) 51.9%; ▌John A. Cameron (Anti-Jacksonian) 48.1%
North Carolina 8	Daniel L. Barringer	Jacksonian	1826 (special)	Incumbent re-elected.	▌ ✓ Daniel L. Barringer (Jacksonian) 61.5%; ▌James A. Craig (Jacksonian) 37.0%; ▌Nathaniel J. Palmer (Unknown) 1.3%; ▌Boyle (Unknown) 0.2%
North Carolina 9	Augustine H. Shepperd	Jacksonian	1827	Incumbent re-elected.	▌ ✓ Augustine H. Shepperd (Jacksonian) 100%
North Carolina 10	John Long	Anti-Jacksonian	1821	Incumbent lost re-election. Jacksonian gain. New member later resigned, leading to a December 2, 1829 special election.	▌ ✓ John Giles (Jacksonian) 58.6%; ▌John Long (Anti-Jacksonian) 41.4%
North Carolina 11	Henry W. Connor	Jacksonian	1821	Incumbent re-elected.	▌ ✓ Henry W. Connor (Jacksonian)
North Carolina 12	Samuel P. Carson	Jacksonian	1825	Incumbent re-elected.	▌ ✓ Samuel P. Carson (Jacksonian) 100%
North Carolina 13	Lewis Williams	Anti-Jacksonian	1815	Incumbent re-elected.	▌ ✓ Lewis Williams (Anti-Jacksonian) 58.6%; ▌Samuel King (Jacksonian) 41.4%

== Ohio ==
Ohio elected its members October 14, 1828.

District	Incumbent			This race	
District	Member	Party	First elected	Results	Candidates
Ohio 1	James Findlay	Jacksonian	1824	Incumbent re-elected.	▌ ✓ James Findlay (Jacksonian) 64.4%; ▌David K. Este (Anti-Jacksonian) 35.6%
Ohio 2	John Woods	Anti-Jacksonian	1824	Incumbent lost re-election. Jacksonian gain.	▌ ✓ James Shields (Jacksonian) 62.1%; ▌John Woods (Anti-Jacksonian) 37.9%
Ohio 3	William McLean	Anti-Jacksonian	1822	Incumbent retired. Anti-Jacksonian hold.	▌ ✓ Joseph H. Crane (Anti-Jacksonian) 57.4%; ▌Morris Seeley (Jacksonian) 42.6%
Ohio 4	Joseph Vance	Anti-Jacksonian	1820	Incumbent re-elected.	▌ ✓ Joseph Vance (Anti-Jacksonian) 64.7%; ▌John Alexander (Jacksonian) 35.3%
Ohio 5	William Russell	Jacksonian	1826	Incumbent re-elected.	▌ ✓ William Russell (Jacksonian) 71.8%; ▌Isaiah Morris (Anti-Jacksonian) 28.2%
Ohio 6	William Creighton Jr.	Anti-Jacksonian	1826	Incumbent re-elected.	▌ ✓ William Creighton Jr. (Anti-Jacksonian) 50.2%; ▌Cadwallader Wallace (Jacksonian) 49.8%
Ohio 7	Samuel F. Vinton	Anti-Jacksonian	1822	Incumbent re-elected.	▌ ✓ Samuel F. Vinton (Anti-Jacksonian) 63.0%; ▌George House (Jacksonian) 37.0%
Ohio 8	William Stanbery	Jacksonian	1827 (special)	Incumbent re-elected.	▌ ✓ William Stanbery (Jacksonian); ▌Isaac Minor (Anti-Jacksonian)
Ohio 9	Philemon Beecher	Anti-Jacksonian	1816; 1820 (lost); 1822	Incumbent lost re-election. Jacksonian gain.	▌ ✓ William W. Irvin (Jacksonian) 56.0%; ▌Philemon Beecher (Anti-Jacksonian) 44.0%
Ohio 10	John Davenport	Anti-Jacksonian	1826	Incumbent lost re-election. Jacksonian gain.	▌ ✓ William Kennon Sr. (Jacksonian) 51.2%; ▌John Davenport (Anti-Jacksonian) 48.8%
Ohio 11	John C. Wright	Anti-Jacksonian	1822	Incumbent lost re-election. Jacksonian gain.	▌ ✓ John M. Goodenow (Jacksonian) 52.6%; ▌John C. Wright (Anti-Jacksonian) 47.4%
Ohio 12	John Sloane	Anti-Jacksonian	1818	Incumbent lost re-election. Jacksonian gain.	▌ ✓ John Thomson (Jacksonian) 46.2%; ▌John Sloane (Anti-Jacksonian) 40.4%; ▌George M. Cook (Unknown) 9.1%; ▌John Harris (Unknown) 4.3%
Ohio 13	Elisha Whittlesey	Anti-Jacksonian	1822	Incumbent re-elected.	▌ ✓ Elisha Whittlesey (Anti-Jacksonian) 81.1%; ▌Eli Baldwin (Jacksonian) 18.9%
Ohio 14	Mordecai Bartley	Anti-Jacksonian	1822	Incumbent re-elected.	▌ ✓ Mordecai Bartley (Anti-Jacksonian) 52.1%; ▌William H. Hunter (Jacksonian) 28.6%; ▌Reuben Wood (Anti-Jacksonian) 19.3%

== Pennsylvania ==
Pennsylvania elected its members October 14, 1828.

District	Incumbent			This race	
District	Member	Party	First elected	Results	Candidates
Pennsylvania 1	Joel B. Sutherland	Jacksonian	1826	Incumbent re-elected.	▌ ✓ Joel B. Sutherland (Jacksonian) 74.7%; ▌Peter A. Browne (Anti-Jacksonian) 25.3%
Pennsylvania 2	John Sergeant	Anti-Jacksonian	1815 (special); 1822 (retired); 1827 (special)	Incumbent lost re-election. Jacksonian gain.	▌ ✓ Joseph Hemphill (Jacksonian) 54.2%; ▌John Sergeant (Anti-Jacksonian) 45.8%
Pennsylvania 3	Daniel H. Miller	Jacksonian	1822	Incumbent re-elected.	▌ ✓ Daniel H. Miller (Jacksonian) 68.3%; ▌Samuel Harvey (Anti-Jacksonian) 31.7%
Pennsylvania 4 Plural district with 3 seats	James Buchanan	Jacksonian	1820	Incumbent re-elected.	▌ ✓ James Buchanan (Jacksonian) 17.6%; ▌ ✓ Joshua Evans Jr. (Jacksonian) 17.5%; ▌ ✓ George G. Leiper (Jacksonian) 17.4%; ▌Samuel Anderson (Anti-Jacksonian) 15.9%; ▌Townsend Haines (Anti-Jacksonian) 15.9%; ▌William Hiester (Jacksonian) 15.8%
Pennsylvania 4 Plural district with 3 seats	Samuel Anderson	Anti-Jacksonian	1826	Incumbent lost re-election. Jacksonian gain.	▌ ✓ James Buchanan (Jacksonian) 17.6%; ▌ ✓ Joshua Evans Jr. (Jacksonian) 17.5%; ▌ ✓ George G. Leiper (Jacksonian) 17.4%; ▌Samuel Anderson (Anti-Jacksonian) 15.9%; ▌Townsend Haines (Anti-Jacksonian) 15.9%; ▌William Hiester (Jacksonian) 15.8%
Pennsylvania 4 Plural district with 3 seats	Charles Miner	Anti-Jacksonian	1824	Incumbent retired. Jacksonian gain.	▌ ✓ James Buchanan (Jacksonian) 17.6%; ▌ ✓ Joshua Evans Jr. (Jacksonian) 17.5%; ▌ ✓ George G. Leiper (Jacksonian) 17.4%; ▌Samuel Anderson (Anti-Jacksonian) 15.9%; ▌Townsend Haines (Anti-Jacksonian) 15.9%; ▌William Hiester (Jacksonian) 15.8%
Pennsylvania 5	John B. Sterigere	Jacksonian	1826	Incumbent re-elected.	▌ ✓ John B. Sterigere (Jacksonian) 56.9%; ▌Joseph Royer (Anti-Jacksonian) 43.1%
Pennsylvania 6	Innis Green	Jacksonian	1826	Incumbent re-elected.	▌ ✓ Innis Green (Jacksonian) 72.0%; ▌Valentine Hummel (Anti-Jacksonian) 28.0%
Pennsylvania 7 Plural district with 2 seats	Joseph Fry Jr.	Jacksonian	1826	Incumbent re-elected.	▌ ✓ Joseph Fry Jr. (Jacksonian) 31.1%; ▌ ✓ Henry A. P. Muhlenberg (Jacksonian) 28.8%; ▌Henry King (Anti-Jacksonian) 20.4%; ▌William Addams (Anti-Jacksonian) 19.6%
Pennsylvania 7 Plural district with 2 seats	William Addams	Jacksonian	1824	Incumbent lost re-election. Jacksonian hold.	▌ ✓ Joseph Fry Jr. (Jacksonian) 31.1%; ▌ ✓ Henry A. P. Muhlenberg (Jacksonian) 28.8%; ▌Henry King (Anti-Jacksonian) 20.4%; ▌William Addams (Anti-Jacksonian) 19.6%
Pennsylvania 8 Plural district with 2 seats	George Wolf	Jacksonian	1824	Incumbent re-elected but resigned August 31, 1829, to become Governor of Pennsylvania, leading to an October 13, 1829 special election.	▌ ✓ George Wolf (Jacksonian) 30.6%; ▌ ✓ Samuel D. Ingham (Jacksonian) 30.0%; ▌James M. Porter (Anti-Jacksonian) 20.0%; ▌Thomas G. Kennedy (Anti-Jacksonian) 19.4%
Pennsylvania 8 Plural district with 2 seats	Samuel D. Ingham	Jacksonian	1812; 1818 (resigned); 1822 (special)	Incumbent re-elected but resigned in March 1829 to become U.S. Secretary of the Treasury, leading to an October 13, 1829 special election.	▌ ✓ George Wolf (Jacksonian) 30.6%; ▌ ✓ Samuel D. Ingham (Jacksonian) 30.0%; ▌James M. Porter (Anti-Jacksonian) 20.0%; ▌Thomas G. Kennedy (Anti-Jacksonian) 19.4%
Pennsylvania 9 Plural district with 3 seats	George Kremer	Jacksonian	1822	Incumbent retired. Jacksonian hold.	▌ ✓ Philander Stephens (Jacksonian) 26.9%; ▌ ✓ James Ford (Jacksonian) 26.6%; ▌ ✓ Alem Marr (Jacksonian) 25.9%; ▌John Murray (Anti-Jacksonian) 8.5%; ▌Chauncey Alford (Anti-Jacksonian) 7.4%; ▌George M. Hollenback (Anti-Jacksonian) 4.7%
Pennsylvania 9 Plural district with 3 seats	Espy Van Horne	Jacksonian	1824	Incumbent retired. Jacksonian hold.	▌ ✓ Philander Stephens (Jacksonian) 26.9%; ▌ ✓ James Ford (Jacksonian) 26.6%; ▌ ✓ Alem Marr (Jacksonian) 25.9%; ▌John Murray (Anti-Jacksonian) 8.5%; ▌Chauncey Alford (Anti-Jacksonian) 7.4%; ▌George M. Hollenback (Anti-Jacksonian) 4.7%
Pennsylvania 9 Plural district with 3 seats	Samuel McKean	Jacksonian	1822	Incumbent retired. Jacksonian hold.	▌ ✓ Philander Stephens (Jacksonian) 26.9%; ▌ ✓ James Ford (Jacksonian) 26.6%; ▌ ✓ Alem Marr (Jacksonian) 25.9%; ▌John Murray (Anti-Jacksonian) 8.5%; ▌Chauncey Alford (Anti-Jacksonian) 7.4%; ▌George M. Hollenback (Anti-Jacksonian) 4.7%
Pennsylvania 10	Adam King	Jacksonian	1826	Incumbent re-elected.	▌ ✓ Adam King (Jacksonian) 63.2%; ▌William McIlvine (Anti-Jacksonian) 36.8%
Pennsylvania 11 Plural district with 2 seats	James Wilson	Anti-Jacksonian	1822	Incumbent lost re-election. Jacksonian gain.	▌ ✓ Thomas H. Crawford (Jacksonian) 29.9%; ▌ ✓ William Ramsey (Jacksonian) 29.3%; ▌James Wilson (Anti-Jacksonian) 20.5%; ▌George Chambers (Anti-Jacksonian) 20.4%
Pennsylvania 11 Plural district with 2 seats	William Ramsey	Jacksonian	1826	Incumbent re-elected.	▌ ✓ Thomas H. Crawford (Jacksonian) 29.9%; ▌ ✓ William Ramsey (Jacksonian) 29.3%; ▌James Wilson (Anti-Jacksonian) 20.5%; ▌George Chambers (Anti-Jacksonian) 20.4%
Pennsylvania 12	John Mitchell	Jacksonian	1824	Incumbent retired. Jacksonian hold.	▌ ✓ John Scott (Jacksonian) 44.3%; ▌William P. Maclay (Anti-Jacksonian) 31.3%; ▌David H. Huling (Jacksonian) 24.4%
Pennsylvania 13	Chauncey Forward	Jacksonian	1826	Incumbent re-elected.	▌ ✓ Chauncey Forward (Jacksonian) 51.9%; ▌William Piper (Anti-Jacksonian) 48.1%
Pennsylvania 14	Andrew Stewart	Anti-Jacksonian	1820	Incumbent lost re-election. Jacksonian gain.	▌ ✓ Thomas Irwin (Jacksonian) 56.3%; ▌Andrew Stewart (Anti-Jacksonian) 43.7%
Pennsylvania 15	Joseph Lawrence	Anti-Jacksonian	1824	Incumbent lost re-election. Jacksonian gain.	▌ ✓ William McCreery (Jacksonian) 64.8%; ▌Joseph Lawrence (Anti-Jacksonian) 35.2%
Pennsylvania 16 Plural district with 2 seats	Robert Orr Jr.	Jacksonian	1825 (special)	Incumbent retired. Jacksonian hold.	▌ ✓ John Gilmore (Jacksonian) 29.6%; ▌ ✓ William Wilkins (Anti-Masonic) 24.7%; ▌James S. Stevenson (Jacksonian) 23.8%; ▌Robert Moore (Anti-Jacksonian) 18.3%; ▌William Ayers (Unknown) 3.6%
Pennsylvania 16 Plural district with 2 seats	James S. Stevenson	Jacksonian	1824	Incumbent lost re-election. Anti-Masonic gain. Winner resigned November 9, 1829, leading to a special election.	▌ ✓ John Gilmore (Jacksonian) 29.6%; ▌ ✓ William Wilkins (Anti-Masonic) 24.7%; ▌James S. Stevenson (Jacksonian) 23.8%; ▌Robert Moore (Anti-Jacksonian) 18.3%; ▌William Ayers (Unknown) 3.6%
Pennsylvania 17	Richard Coulter	Jacksonian	1826	Incumbent re-elected.	▌ ✓ Richard Coulter (Jacksonian) 100%
Pennsylvania 18	Stephen Barlow	Jacksonian	1826	Incumbent lost re-election. Anti-Jacksonian gain.	▌ ✓ Thomas H. Sill (Anti-Jacksonian) 54.3%; ▌Stephen Barlow (Jacksonian) 45.7%

== Rhode Island ==
Rhode Island elected its members August 27, 1829, after the term began but before Congress convened.

District	Incumbent			This race	
District	Member	Party	First elected	Results	Candidates
Rhode Island at-large 2 seats on a general ticket	Dutee J. Pearce	Anti-Jacksonian	1825	Incumbent re-elected.	▌ ✓ Dutee J. Pearce (Anti-Jacksonian) 37.5%; ▌ ✓ Tristam Burges (Anti-Jacksonian) 35.6%; ▌Samuel Eddy (Jacksonian) 10.8%; ▌Job Durfee (Jacksonian) 9.8%; ▌Elisha R. Potter (Unknown) 4.5%; ▌John D'Wolf (Unknown) 1.8%
Rhode Island at-large 2 seats on a general ticket	Tristam Burges	Anti-Jacksonian	1825	Incumbent re-elected.	▌ ✓ Dutee J. Pearce (Anti-Jacksonian) 37.5%; ▌ ✓ Tristam Burges (Anti-Jacksonian) 35.6%; ▌Samuel Eddy (Jacksonian) 10.8%; ▌Job Durfee (Jacksonian) 9.8%; ▌Elisha R. Potter (Unknown) 4.5%; ▌John D'Wolf (Unknown) 1.8%

== South Carolina ==
South Carolina elected its members October 13–14, 1828.

District	Incumbent			This race	
District	Member	Party	First elected	Results	Candidates
South Carolina 1	William Drayton	Jacksonian	1825 (special)	Incumbent re-elected.	▌ ✓ William Drayton (Jacksonian)
South Carolina 2	James Hamilton Jr.	Jacksonian	1822 (special)	Incumbent retired. Jacksonian hold.	▌ ✓ Robert W. Barnwell (Jacksonian)
South Carolina 3	Thomas R. Mitchell	Jacksonian	1820; 1823 (lost); 1824	Incumbent lost re-election. Jacksonian hold.	▌ ✓ John Campbell (Jacksonian); ▌Thomas R. Mitchell (Jacksonian)
South Carolina 4	William D. Martin	Jacksonian	1826	Incumbent re-elected.	▌ ✓ William D. Martin (Jacksonian)
South Carolina 5	George McDuffie	Jacksonian	1820	Incumbent re-elected.	▌ ✓ George McDuffie (Jacksonian)
South Carolina 6	Warren R. Davis	Jacksonian	1826	Incumbent re-elected.	▌ ✓ Warren R. Davis (Jacksonian) 76.1% (Note: Based on incomplete returns.); ▌Cobb (Unknown) 23.9%
South Carolina 7	William T. Nuckolls	Jacksonian	1826	Incumbent re-elected.	▌ ✓ William T. Nuckolls (Jacksonian)
South Carolina 8	John Carter	Jacksonian	1822 (special)	Incumbent retired. Jacksonian hold.	▌ ✓ James Blair (Jacksonian) 41.5%; ▌Richard Irvine Manning I (Jacksonian) 38.7%; ▌James G. Spann (Jacksonian) 19.8%
South Carolina 9	Starling Tucker	Jacksonian	1816	Incumbent re-elected.	▌ ✓ Starling Tucker (Jacksonian)

== Tennessee ==
Tennessee elected its members August 6–7, 1829 after the term began but before Congress convened.

District	Incumbent			This race	
District	Member	Party	First elected	Results	Candidates
Tennessee 1	John Blair	Jacksonian	1823	Incumbent re-elected.	▌ ✓ John Blair (Jacksonian) 67.3%; ▌John A. Rogers (Unknown) 16.5%; ▌William Priestly (Unknown) 16.2%
Tennessee 2	Pryor Lea	Jacksonian	1827	Incumbent re-elected.	▌ ✓ Pryor Lea (Jacksonian) 51.2%; ▌Thomas D. Arnold (Anti-Jacksonian) 48.8%
Tennessee 3	James C. Mitchell	Jacksonian	1825	Incumbent retired. Jacksonian hold.	▌ ✓ James I. Standifer (Jacksonian) 82.3%; ▌James Lowry (Unknown) 17.7%
Tennessee 4	Jacob C. Isacks	Jacksonian	1823	Incumbent re-elected.	▌ ✓ Jacob C. Isacks (Jacksonian) 100%
Tennessee 5	Robert Desha	Jacksonian	1827	Incumbent re-elected.	▌ ✓ Robert Desha (Jacksonian) 64.2%; ▌William Trousdale (Jacksonian) 35.8%
Tennessee 6	James K. Polk	Jacksonian	1825	Incumbent re-elected.	▌ ✓ James K. Polk (Jacksonian) 100%
Tennessee 7	John Bell	Jacksonian	1827	Incumbent re-elected.	▌ ✓ John Bell (Jacksonian) 100%
Tennessee 8	John H. Marable	Jacksonian	1825	Incumbent lost re-election. Jacksonian hold.	▌ ✓ Cave Johnson (Jacksonian) 52.9%; ▌John H. Marable (Jacksonian) 47.1%
Tennessee 9	Davy Crockett	Jacksonian	1827	Incumbent re-elected to a different party. Anti-Jacksonian gain.	✓ Davy Crockett (Anti-Jacksonian) 63.8%; ▌Adam R. Alexander (Jacksonian) 34.3%; ▌Joel Estes (Unknown) 1.6%; ▌James Clark (Unknown) 0.2%

== Vermont ==
Vermont elected its members September 2, 1828. Vermont required a majority vote for election, so the 3rd district district election was settled on the second ballot on November 11, 1828, and the 5th district district election was settled on the eighth ballot on November 2, 1829.

District	Incumbent			This race	
District	Member	Party	First elected	Results	Candidates
Vermont 1	Jonathan Hunt	Anti-Jacksonian	1826	Incumbent re-elected.	▌ ✓ Jonathan Hunt (Anti-Jacksonian) 86.2%; ▌Daniel Kellogg (Jacksonian) 9.3%; ▌Orsamus Cook Merrill (Jacksonian) 1.4%
Vermont 2	Rollin C. Mallary	Anti-Jacksonian	1818	Incumbent re-elected.	▌ ✓ Rollin C. Mallary (Anti-Jacksonian); Uncontested
Vermont 3	George E. Wales	Anti-Jacksonian	1824	Incumbent lost re-election. Anti-Jacksonian hold.	First ballot (September 2, 1828): ▌Horace Everett (Anti-Jacksonian) 43.0%; ▌George E. Wales (Anti-Jacksonian) 24.5%; ▌Jacob Collamer (Anti-Jacksonian) 22.7%; ▌Asa Aikens (Unknown) 7.0%; Second ballot (November 11, 1828): ▌ ✓ Horace Everett (Anti-Jacksonian) 56.3%; ▌George E. Wales (Anti-Jacksonian) 24.7%; ▌Jacob Collamer (Anti-Jacksonian) 15.1%; ▌Asa Aikens (Unknown) 3.3%
Vermont 4	Benjamin Swift	Anti-Jacksonian	1826	Incumbent re-elected.	▌ ✓ Benjamin Swift (Anti-Jacksonian) 67.6%; ▌Ezra Meech (Jacksonian) 30.0%
Vermont 5	D. Azro A. Buck	Anti-Jacksonian	1822; 1824 (lost); 1826	Incumbent lost re-election. Anti-Masonic gain.	First ballot (September 2, 1828): ▌D. Azro A. Buck (Anti-Jacksonian) 38.9%; ▌Seth Cushman (Jacksonian) 26.2%; ▌William Cahoon (Anti-Masonic) 24.1%; ▌James Bell (Anti-Jacksonian) 8.8%; Second ballot (November 11, 1828): ▌D. Azro A. Buck (Anti-Jacksonian) 40.8%; ▌Seth Cushman (Jacksonian) 36.9%; ▌William Cahoon (Anti-Masonic) 19.5%; ▌James Bell (Anti-Jacksonian) 2.7%; Third ballot (January 5, 1829): ▌Seth Cushman (Jacksonian) 40.4%; ▌D. Azro A. Buck (Anti-Jacksonian) 40.0%; ▌William Cahoon (Anti-Masonic) 18.4%; ▌James Bell (Anti-Jacksonian) 1.2%; Fourth ballot (March 2, 1829): ▌Seth Cushman (Jacksonian) 41.0%; ▌D. Azro A. Buck (Anti-Jacksonian) 32.8%; ▌William Cahoon (Anti-Masonic) 23.7%; ▌James Bell (Anti-Jacksonian) 2.1%; Fifth ballot (May 4, 1829): ▌Seth Cushman (Jacksonian) 40.1%; ▌William Cahoon (Anti-Masonic) 30.9%; ▌D. Azro A. Buck (Anti-Jacksonian) 24.7%; ▌James Bell (Anti-Jacksonian) 3.9%; Sixth ballot (July 6, 1829): ▌William Cahoon (Anti-Masonic) 37.7%; ▌Seth Cushman (Jacksonian) 33.7%; ▌James Bell (Anti-Jacksonian) 17.2%; ▌D. Azro A. Buck (Anti-Jacksonian) 11.0%; Seventh ballot (September 7, 1829): ▌Samuel Prentiss (Independent) 48.6%; ▌William Cahoon (Anti-Masonic) 47.1%; Write-ins 4.3%; Eighth ballot (November 2, 1829): ▌ ✓ William Cahoon (Anti-Masonic) 57.9%; ▌James Bell (Anti-Jacksonian) 28.5%; ▌Seth Cushman (Jacksonian) 6.9%; Write-ins 6.7%

== Virginia ==
Virginia elected its members in April 1829 after the term began but before Congress convened.

District	Incumbent			This race	
District	Member	Party	First elected	Results	Candidates
Virginia 1	Thomas Newton Jr.	Anti-Jacksonian	1801	Incumbent re-elected. The election was later successfully contested.	▌ ✓ Thomas Newton Jr. (Anti-Jacksonian) 50.3%; ▌George Loyall (Jacksonian) 49.7%
Virginia 2	James Trezvant	Jacksonian	1825	Incumbent re-elected.	▌ ✓ James Trezvant (Jacksonian) 100%
Virginia 3	William S. Archer	Jacksonian	1820 (special)	Incumbent re-elected.	▌ ✓ William S. Archer (Jacksonian) 100%
Virginia 4	Mark Alexander	Jacksonian	1819	Incumbent re-elected.	▌ ✓ Mark Alexander (Jacksonian) 100%
Virginia 5	John Randolph	Jacksonian	1799; 1812 (lost); 1815; 1817 (retired); 1819; 1825 (resigned); 1827	Incumbent retired. Jacksonian hold.	▌ ✓ Thomas T. Bouldin (Jacksonian) 46.1%; ▌George W. Crump (Jacksonian) 42.0%; ▌John Miller (Unknown) 11.9%
Virginia 6	Thomas Davenport	Jacksonian	1825	Incumbent re-elected.	▌ ✓ Thomas Davenport (Jacksonian) 100%
Virginia 7	Nathaniel H. Claiborne	Jacksonian	1825	Incumbent re-elected.	▌ ✓ Nathaniel H. Claiborne (Jacksonian) 100%
Virginia 8	Burwell Bassett	Jacksonian	1805; 1812 (lost); 1815; 1819 (retired); 1821	Incumbent lost re-election. Jacksonian hold.	▌ ✓ Richard Coke Jr. (Jacksonian) 41.7%; ▌Burwell Bassett (Jacksonian) 37.5%; ▌Carter M. Braxton (Unknown) 20.8%
Virginia 9	Andrew Stevenson	Jacksonian	1821	Incumbent re-elected.	▌ ✓ Andrew Stevenson (Jacksonian) 100%
Virginia 10	William C. Rives	Jacksonian	1823	Incumbent re-elected.	▌ ✓ William C. Rives (Jacksonian) 100%
Virginia 11	Philip P. Barbour	Jacksonian	1814 (special); 1825 (retired); 1827	Incumbent re-elected.	▌ ✓ Philip P. Barbour (Jacksonian) 100%
Virginia 12	John Roane	Jacksonian	1809; 1815 (retired); 1827	Incumbent re-elected.	▌ ✓ John Roane (Jacksonian) 100%
Virginia 13	John Taliaferro	Anti-Jacksonian	1801; 1803 (retired); 1811 (challenge); 1813 (lost); 1824 (special)	Incumbent re-elected.	▌ ✓ John Taliaferro (Anti-Jacksonian) 61.8%; ▌Willoughby Newton (Unknown) 38.2%
Virginia 14	Charles F. Mercer	Anti-Jacksonian	1817	Incumbent re-elected.	▌ ✓ Charles F. Mercer (Anti-Jacksonian) 82.0%; ▌John Gibson (Unknown) 18.0%
Virginia 15	John S. Barbour	Jacksonian	1823	Incumbent re-elected.	▌ ✓ John S. Barbour (Jacksonian) 100%
Virginia 16	William Armstrong	Anti-Jacksonian	1825	Incumbent re-elected.	▌ ✓ William Armstrong (Anti-Jacksonian) 100%
Virginia 17	Robert Allen	Jacksonian	1827	Incumbent re-elected.	▌ ✓ Robert Allen (Jacksonian) 61.5%; ▌Samuel Kerceval (Unknown) 38.5%
Virginia 18	Isaac Leffler	Anti-Jacksonian	1827	Incumbent retired. Anti-Jacksonian hold.	▌ ✓ Philip Doddridge (Anti-Jacksonian) 59.6%; ▌Joseph Johnson (Jacksonian) 40.4%
Virginia 19	William McCoy	Jacksonian	1811	Incumbent re-elected.	▌ ✓ William McCoy (Jacksonian) 100%
Virginia 20	John Floyd	Jacksonian	1817	Incumbent retired. Jacksonian hold.	▌ ✓ Robert Craig (Jacksonian) 55.0%; ▌Fleming B. Miller (Unknown) 45.0%
Virginia 21	Lewis Maxwell	Anti-Jacksonian	1827	Incumbent re-elected.	▌ ✓ Lewis Maxwell (Anti-Jacksonian) 40.0%; ▌Joseph Lowell (Unknown) 39.8%; ▌William Smith (Jacksonian) 20.2%
Virginia 22	Alexander Smyth	Jacksonian	1817; 1825 (lost); 1827	Incumbent re-elected.	▌ ✓ Alexander Smyth (Jacksonian) 100%

== Non-voting delegates ==
District	Incumbent			This race	
District	Delegate	Party	First elected	Results	Candidates
Arkansas Territory at-large	Ambrose H. Sevier	None	1828 (special)	Incumbent re-elected.	✓ Ambrose H. Sevier
Florida Territory at-large	Joseph M. White	Jacksonian	1824	Incumbent re-elected.	▌ ✓ Joseph M. White (Unknown)
Michigan Territory at-large	Austin E. Wing	[data missing]	1824	Retired	▌ ✓ John Biddle

== See also ==
- 1828 United States elections
  - List of United States House of Representatives elections (1824–1854)
  - 1828 United States presidential election
  - 1828–29 United States Senate elections
- 20th United States Congress
- 21st United States Congress

== Bibliography ==
- Dubin, Michael J. (March 1, 1998). United States Congressional Elections, 1788-1997: The Official Results of the Elections of the 1st Through 105th Congresses. McFarland and Company. ISBN 978-0786402830.
- Martis, Kenneth C. (January 1, 1989). The Historical Atlas of Political Parties in the United States Congress, 1789-1989. Macmillan Publishing Company. ISBN 978-0029201701.
- Moore, John L., ed. (1994). Congressional Quarterly's Guide to U.S. Elections (Third ed.). Congressional Quarterly Inc. ISBN 978-0871879967.
- "Party Divisions of the House of Representatives* 1789–Present". Office of the Historian, House of United States House of Representatives.
- "Twentieth Congress March 4, 1827, to March 3, 1829". Office of the Historian, United States House of Representatives. Archived from the original on December 23, 2018 – via History.house.gov.
- "Twenty-First Congress March 4, 1829, to March 3, 1831". Office of the Historian, United States House of Representatives. Archived from the original on December 23, 2018 – via History.house.gov.
