= Charles Fisher =

Charles Fisher may refer to:

== Politicians ==
- Charles Fisher (North Carolina politician) (1789–1849), American politician
- Charles Fisher (Canadian politician) (1808–1880), Canadian jurist & politician
- Charles Fisher (North-West Territories politician), (1865–unknown), Canadian politician
- Charles W. Fisher (Canadian politician) (1866–1919), Canadian politician
- Charles W. Fisher (American politician) (1896–1981), California politician
- Charles Thompson Fisher (1846–1930), American farmer and politician from Wisconsin
- Charles M. Fisher (1899–1966), American politician

== Others ==
- Charles Frederick Fisher (1816–1861), American legislator, railroad president and soldier
- Charles Fisher (actor) (1816–1891), Anglo-American comedian
- Charles T. Fisher (1880–1963), American businessman
- Charles Dennis Fisher (1877–1916), British academic
- Charlie Fisher (Australian footballer) (1892–1983), Australian rules footballer
- Charles Fisher (poet) (1914–2006), poet and journalist in Britain and Canada
- Charles Fisher (headmaster) (1921–1978), Australian headmaster
- Charles Fisher (producer) (fl. 1990s), Australian record producer
- Charles Fisher (American football) (born 1976), American football defensive back
- Charlie Fisher (American football) (fl. 1982–2019), American college football coach
- Charlie Fisher (baseball) (1852–1917), 19th-century baseball player
- Charles Fisher (baseball), baseball player for the 1889 Louisville Colonels
- Charles J. Fisher, author and historic preservation activist in Los Angeles
- Charles Brown Fisher (1817–1908), Australian pastoralist and racehorse breeder
- Charles Fisher (footballer) (1899–1985), English footballer
- Charles R. Fisher, marine biologist
- Charles W. Fisher Jr., United States Navy admiral
- C. Miller Fisher (1913–2012), neurologist
- Charles Fisher (rower), 2016 and 2018 member of Cambridge University boat race crew
- Charles F. Fisher, county commissioner in Somerset County, Maryland

== See also ==
- Charles Fischer, a minor character on Terminator: The Sarah Connor Chronicles
