= 1829 North Carolina's 10th congressional district special election =

John Giles was elected August 13, 1829 to the term beginning March 4, 1829, but resigned from the seat without having served.

A special election was held December 2, 1829 to finish the term. Abraham Rencher (Jacksonian) won the election, defeated the previous incumbent, John Long, and was seated December 7, 1829 for the beginning of the 21st United States Congress.

== See also ==
- 1828 and 1829 United States House of Representatives elections
- List of United States representatives from North Carolina
