= Justice Hathaway =

Justice Hathaway may refer to:

- Diane Hathaway (born 1954), associate justice of the Michigan Supreme Court
- Joshua W. Hathaway (1797–1862), associate justice of the Maine Supreme Judicial Court
