= 1828 Mississippi's at-large congressional district special election =

A special election was held in Mississippi's at-large congressional district on October 20, 1828, to fill a vacancy left by the resignation of William Haile (J) on September 12, 1828

== Election results ==
Candidate	Party	Votes	Percent
Thomas Hinds	Jacksonian	1,238	92.9%
Others		95	7.1%

Hinds took his seat December 8, 1828. Hinds had earlier won the general election to the 21st Congress.

== See also ==
- List of special elections to the United States House of Representatives
- List of United States representatives from Mississippi
- 1828 United States House of Representatives elections
