= William Carter Love =

American politician

Member of the U.S. House of Representatives from North Carolina's 10th district
- In office March 4, 1815 – March 4, 1817
- Preceded by: Joseph Pearson
- Succeeded by: George Mumford

Personal details
- Born: 1784 Near Norfolk, Virginia, United States
- Died: December 3, 1824 (aged 39–40)
- Party: Democratic-Republican
- Education: University of North Carolina at Chapel Hill (studied law)
- Occupation: Politician

William Carter Love (1784 – December 3, 1824) was a congressional representative from North Carolina.

== Early life and education ==
He was born near Norfolk, Virginia, in 1784. He moved to Chapel Hill, North Carolina. He was tutored at home. He then attended the University of North Carolina at Chapel Hill from 1802 to 1804 and studied law. He was admitted to the bar and commenced practice in Salisbury, North Carolina, in 1806.

== Political career ==
He was elected as a Democratic-Republican to the Fourteenth Congress as a representative of North Carolina's 10th congressional district on August 10, 1815, and sworn in on December 6, 1815.

== Later life and death ==
He resumed the practice of law in Salisbury, Rowan County, N.C. He died on December 3, 1824 in Salisbury. His interment was held in a private cemetery in the city.

== See also ==
- Fourteenth United States Congress

U.S. House of Representatives
Preceded by Joseph Pearson	Member of the U.S. House of Representatives from North Carolina's 10th congressional district 1815–1817	Succeeded by George Mumford
