= George Mumford =

American politician

George Mumford (died December 31, 1818) was a United States representative from North Carolina.

Mumford was born in Rowan County, North Carolina, birth date unknown. He attended the common schools. He was a member of the State house of commons in 1810 and 1811. He was elected as a Democratic-Republican to the Fifteenth Congress (March 4, 1817 – December 31, 1818)

Mumford died in Washington, D.C. and was buried in the Congressional Cemetery.

== See also ==
- List of members of the United States Congress who died in office (1790–1899)

U.S. House of Representatives
Preceded by William C. Love	Member of the U.S. House of Representatives from North Carolina's 10th congressional district 1817–1818	Succeeded by Charles Fisher
