= North Carolina's 10th congressional district =

U.S. House district for North Carolina

Coordinates: 35.61°N 81.34°W

- Interactive map of district boundaries since January 3, 2025 (Note: As the mid-decade redistricting bill (S249) enacted on October 22, 2025 only changed the compositions of North Carolina's 1st and 3rd congressional districts, boundaries of other districts will not change at the 2026 elections.)
- Representative: Pat Harrigan; R–Hickory
- Population (2025): 800,223
- Median household income: $72,797
- Ethnicity: 66.1% White; 15.5% Black; 11.4% Hispanic; 3.8% Two or more races; 2.6% Asian; 0.6% other
- Cook PVI: R+9

North Carolina's 10th congressional district is a congressional district in central and western North Carolina. It currently includes all of Catawba, Iredell, Lincoln, and Yadkin counties, and most of Forsyth County including much of the city of Winston-Salem. The district has a Cook Partisan Voting Index rating of R+9.

Republicans have won the district continuously since 1969, and the last Democrat to win this district was Basil Whitener who represented it from 1963 to 1969. Republican Pat Harrigan has represented the district since 2025.

The 10th district was part of the controversial statewide redistricting by the Republican-led state legislature in 2011. The district's northwest border was redrawn to include most of heavily Democratic Asheville, long the heart of the 11th district. At the same time, some heavily Republican areas in the 10th were shifted to the 11th. While this made the 10th approximately seven points more Democratic, it was not nearly enough to overcome the heavy Republican tilt in the western Charlotte suburbs.

On February 23, 2022, the North Carolina Supreme Court had approved a new map to only be used for the 2024 United States House of Representatives elections in North Carolina which changed the 10th district boundaries to include Alexander, Burke, northwest Gaston County, eastern Rutherford County and a small section of southeastern Caldwell County.

On October 25, 2023 the North Carolina General Assembly passed a new congressional map for the 2024 United States House of Representatives elections in North Carolina to include Yadkin county, and most of Forsyth County including much of Winston-Salem, shifting the normally heavily Republican district's Cook Partisan Voting Index from R+22 to R+9. The district has historically been the most Republican district in the state and normally the most exurban in character.

== Counties ==
For the 119th and successive Congresses (based on the districts drawn following a 2023 legislative session), the district contains all or portions of the following counties and communities.

Catawba County (11)

All 11 communities

Forsyth County (9)

Bethania, Clemmons (part; also 6th), Germanton (part; also 5th; shared with Stokes County), King (part; also 5th; shared with Stokes County), Lewisville, Rural Hall, Tobaccoville, Walkertown (part; also 6th), Winston-Salem (part; also 6th)

Iredell County (8)

All eight communities

Lincoln County (7)

All seven communities

Yadkin County (5)

All five communities

== Recent election results from statewide races ==
Year	Office	Results
2008	President	McCain 54% - 45%
2008	Senate	Dole 49% - 48%
2008	Governor	McCrory 55% - 43%
2010	Senate	Burr 62% - 36%
2012	President	Romney 57% - 43%
2012	Governor	McCrory 62% - 36%
2014	Senate	Tillis 55% - 41%
2016	President	Trump 57% - 39%
2016	Senate	Burr 58% - 38%
2016	Governor	McCrory 54% - 43%
2016	Lt. Governor	Forest 59% - 38%
2016	Secretary of State	LaPaglia 55% - 45%
2016	Auditor	Stuber 57% - 43%
2016	Treasurer	Folwell 60% - 40%
2016	Attorney General	Newton 56% - 44%
2020	President	Trump 57% - 41%
2020	Senate	Tillis 56% - 40%
2020	Governor	Forest 54% - 44%
2020	Lt. Governor	Robinson 59% - 41%
2020	Secretary of State	Sykes 57% - 43%
2020	Auditor	Street 57% - 43%
2020	Treasurer	Folwell 60% - 40%
2020	Attorney General	O'Neill 58% - 42%
2022	Senate	Budd 58% - 39%
2024	President	Trump 58% - 41%
2024	Governor	Stein 48% - 46%
2024	Lt. Governor	Weatherman 55% - 42%
2024	Secretary of State	Brown 57% - 43%
2024	Auditor	Boliek 57% - 40%
2024	Treasurer	Briner 60% - 40%
2024	Attorney General	Bishop 56% - 44%

== List of members representing the district ==
Member (Residence)	Party	Years	Cong ress	Electoral history	District location
District established March 4, 1793
Benjamin Williams (Glendon)	Anti-Administration	March 4, 1793 – March 3, 1795	3rd	Elected in 1793. Lost re-election.	
Nathan Bryan (Craven County)	Democratic-Republican	March 4, 1795 – June 4, 1798	4th 5th	Elected in 1795. Re-elected in 1796. Died.	
Vacant		June 4, 1798 – December 10, 1798	5th		
Richard D. Spaight (New Bern)	Democratic-Republican	December 10, 1798 – March 3, 1801	5th 6th	Elected to finish Bryan's term. Also elected in 1798 to the next term. Lost re-election.	
John Stanly (New Bern)	Federalist	March 4, 1801 – March 3, 1803	7th	Elected in 1800. Redistricted to the 4th district and lost re-election.	
Nathaniel Alexander (Charlotte)	Democratic-Republican	March 4, 1803 – November 1805	8th 9th	Elected in 1803. Re-elected in 1804. Resigned to become governor of North Carolina.	1803–1813 "North Carolina congressional district map (1803–13)".
Vacant		November 1805 – February 24, 1806	9th		1803–1813 "North Carolina congressional district map (1803–13)".
Evan S. Alexander (Salisbury)	Democratic-Republican	February 24, 1806 – March 3, 1809	9th 10th	Elected to finish his cousin's term. Re-elected in 1806. Retired.	1803–1813 "North Carolina congressional district map (1803–13)".
Joseph Pearson (Salisbury)	Federalist	March 4, 1809 – March 3, 1815	11th 12th 13th	Elected in 1808. Re-elected in 1810. Re-elected in 1813. Lost re-election.	1803–1813 "North Carolina congressional district map (1803–13)".
William C. Love (Salisbury)	Democratic-Republican	March 4, 1815 – March 3, 1817	14th	Elected in 1815. Retired.	1813–1843 "North Carolina congressional district map (1813–43)".
George Mumford (Salisbury)	Democratic-Republican	March 4, 1817 – December 31, 1818	15th	Elected in 1817. Died.	1813–1843 "North Carolina congressional district map (1813–43)".
Vacant		December 31, 1818 – February 11, 1819	15th		1813–1843 "North Carolina congressional district map (1813–43)".
Charles Fisher (Salisbury)	Democratic-Republican	February 11, 1819 – March 3, 1821	15th 16th	Elected in early 1819 to finish Mumford's term and seated February 11, 1819. Re-elected later in 1819. Retired.	1813–1843 "North Carolina congressional district map (1813–43)".
John Long (Long's Mil)	Democratic-Republican (Note: Supported the Crawford faction in the 1824 United States presidential election.)	March 4, 1821 – March 3, 1825	17th 18th 19th 20th	Elected in 1821. Re-elected in 1823. Re-elected in 1825. Re-elected in 1827. Lost re-election.	1813–1843 "North Carolina congressional district map (1813–43)".
John Long (Long's Mil)	Anti-Jacksonian	March 4, 1825 – March 3, 1829	17th 18th 19th 20th	Elected in 1821. Re-elected in 1823. Re-elected in 1825. Re-elected in 1827. Lost re-election.	1813–1843 "North Carolina congressional district map (1813–43)".
Vacant		March 4, 1829 – December 2, 1829	21st	Representative-elect John Giles resigned before Congress convened.	1813–1843 "North Carolina congressional district map (1813–43)".
Abraham Rencher (Pittsboro)	Jacksonian	December 2, 1829 – March 3, 1833	21st 22nd 23rd 24th 25th	Elected December 2, 1829 to finish Giles's term and seated December 7, 1829. Re-elected in 1831. Re-elected in 1833. Re-elected in 1835. Re-elected in 1837. [data missing]	1813–1843 "North Carolina congressional district map (1813–43)".
Abraham Rencher (Pittsboro)	Anti-Jacksonian	March 4, 1833 – March 3, 1837	21st 22nd 23rd 24th 25th	Elected December 2, 1829 to finish Giles's term and seated December 7, 1829. Re-elected in 1831. Re-elected in 1833. Re-elected in 1835. Re-elected in 1837. [data missing]	1813–1843 "North Carolina congressional district map (1813–43)".
Abraham Rencher (Pittsboro)	Whig	March 4, 1837 – March 3, 1839	21st 22nd 23rd 24th 25th	Elected December 2, 1829 to finish Giles's term and seated December 7, 1829. Re-elected in 1831. Re-elected in 1833. Re-elected in 1835. Re-elected in 1837. [data missing]	1813–1843 "North Carolina congressional district map (1813–43)".
Charles Fisher (Salisbury)	Democratic	March 4, 1839 – March 3, 1841	26th	Elected in 1839. [data missing]	1813–1843 "North Carolina congressional district map (1813–43)".
Abraham Rencher (Pittsboro)	Whig	March 4, 1841 – March 3, 1843	27th	Elected in 1841. [data missing]	1813–1843 "North Carolina congressional district map (1813–43)".
District dissolved March 4, 1843
District re-established March 3, 1903
James M. Gudger Jr. (Asheville)	Democratic	March 4, 1903 – March 3, 1907	58th 59th	Elected in 1902. Re-elected in 1904. [data missing]	
William T. Crawford (Waynesville)	Democratic	March 4, 1907 – March 3, 1909	60th	Elected in 1906. [data missing]	
John G. Grant (Hendersonville)	Republican	March 4, 1909 – March 3, 1911	61st	Elected in 1908. [data missing]	
James M. Gudger Jr. (Asheville)	Democratic	March 4, 1911 – March 3, 1915	62nd 63rd	Elected in 1910. Re-elected in 1912. [data missing]	
James J. Britt (Asheville)	Republican	March 4, 1915 – March 3, 1917	64th	Elected in 1914. [data missing]	
Zebulon Weaver (Asheville)	Democratic	March 4, 1917 – March 1, 1919	65th	Lost contested election.	
James J. Britt (Asheville)	Republican	March 1, 1919 – March 3, 1919	65th	Won contested election.	
Zebulon Weaver (Asheville)	Democratic	March 4, 1919 – March 3, 1929	66th 67th 68th 69th 70th	Elected in 1918. Re-elected in 1920. Re-elected in 1922. Re-elected in 1924. Re-elected in 1926. [data missing]	
George M. Pritchard (Asheville)	Republican	March 4, 1929 – March 3, 1931	71st	Elected in 1928. [data missing]	
Zebulon Weaver (Asheville)	Democratic	March 4, 1931 – March 3, 1933	72nd	Elected in 1930. Redistricted to the 11th district.	
Alfred L. Bulwinkle (Gastonia)	Democratic	March 4, 1933 – January 3, 1943	73rd 74th 75th 76th 77th	Redistricted from the 9th district and re-elected in 1932. Re-elected in 1934. Re-elected in 1936. Re-elected in 1938. Re-elected in 1940. Redistricted to the 11th district.	
Cameron A. Morrison (Charlotte)	Democratic	January 3, 1943 – January 3, 1945	78th	Elected in 1942. [data missing]	
Joseph W. Ervin (Charlotte)	Democratic	January 3, 1945 – December 25, 1945	79th	Elected in 1944. Died.	
Vacant		December 25, 1945 – January 22, 1946	79th		
Sam J. Ervin Jr. (Morganton)	Democratic	January 22, 1946 – January 3, 1947	79th	Elected to finish his brother's term. [data missing]	
Hamilton C. Jones (Charlotte)	Democratic	January 3, 1947 – January 3, 1953	80th 81st 82nd	Elected in 1946. Re-elected in 1948. Re-elected in 1950. [data missing]	
Charles R. Jonas (Lincolnton)	Republican	January 3, 1953 – January 3, 1963	83rd 84th 85th 86th 87th	Elected in 1952. Re-elected in 1954. Re-elected in 1956. Re-elected in 1958. Re-elected in 1960. Redistricted to the 8th district.	
Basil Whitener (Gastonia)	Democratic	January 3, 1963 – January 3, 1969	88th 89th 90th	Redistricted from the 11th district and re-elected in 1962. Re-elected in 1964. Re-elected in 1966. Lost re-election after redistricting.	
Jim Broyhill (Lenoir)	Republican	January 3, 1969 – July 14, 1986	91st 92nd 93rd 94th 95th 96th 97th 98th 99th	Redistricted from the 9th district and re-elected in 1968. Re-elected in 1970. Re-elected in 1972. Re-elected in 1974. Re-elected in 1976. Re-elected in 1978. Re-elected in 1980. Re-elected in 1982. Re-elected in 1984. Resigned when appointed U.S. senator.	
Vacant		July 14, 1986 – November 4, 1986	99th		
Cass Ballenger (Hickory)	Republican	November 4, 1986 – January 3, 2005	99th 100th 101st 102nd 103rd 104th 105th 106th 107th 108th	Elected to finish Broyhill's term. Re-elected in 1986. Re-elected in 1988. Re-elected in 1990. Re-elected in 1992. Re-elected in 1994. Re-elected in 1996. Re-elected in 1998. Re-elected in 2000. Re-elected in 2002. Retired	
Patrick McHenry (Lake Norman of Catawba)	Republican	January 3, 2005 – January 3, 2025	109th 110th 111th 112th 113th 114th 115th 116th 117th 118th	Elected in 2004. Re-elected in 2006. Re-elected in 2008. Re-elected in 2010. Re-elected in 2012. Re-elected in 2014. Re-elected in 2016. Re-elected in 2018. Re-elected in 2020. Re-elected in 2022. Retired.	2003–2013 2003–2013
Patrick McHenry (Lake Norman of Catawba)	Republican	January 3, 2005 – January 3, 2025	109th 110th 111th 112th 113th 114th 115th 116th 117th 118th	Elected in 2004. Re-elected in 2006. Re-elected in 2008. Re-elected in 2010. Re-elected in 2012. Re-elected in 2014. Re-elected in 2016. Re-elected in 2018. Re-elected in 2020. Re-elected in 2022. Retired.	2013–2017 2013–2017
Patrick McHenry (Lake Norman of Catawba)	Republican	January 3, 2005 – January 3, 2025	109th 110th 111th 112th 113th 114th 115th 116th 117th 118th	Elected in 2004. Re-elected in 2006. Re-elected in 2008. Re-elected in 2010. Re-elected in 2012. Re-elected in 2014. Re-elected in 2016. Re-elected in 2018. Re-elected in 2020. Re-elected in 2022. Retired.	2017–2021
Patrick McHenry (Lake Norman of Catawba)	Republican	January 3, 2005 – January 3, 2025	109th 110th 111th 112th 113th 114th 115th 116th 117th 118th	Elected in 2004. Re-elected in 2006. Re-elected in 2008. Re-elected in 2010. Re-elected in 2012. Re-elected in 2014. Re-elected in 2016. Re-elected in 2018. Re-elected in 2020. Re-elected in 2022. Retired.	2021–2023 Static map of 2021-3 congressional district
Patrick McHenry (Lake Norman of Catawba)	Republican	January 3, 2005 – January 3, 2025	109th 110th 111th 112th 113th 114th 115th 116th 117th 118th	Elected in 2004. Re-elected in 2006. Re-elected in 2008. Re-elected in 2010. Re-elected in 2012. Re-elected in 2014. Re-elected in 2016. Re-elected in 2018. Re-elected in 2020. Re-elected in 2022. Retired.	2023–2025
Pat Harrigan (Hickory)	Republican	January 3, 2025 – present	119th	Elected in 2024. Re-elected in 2026.	2025–present

== Past election results ==
=== 2012 ===
2012 North Carolina's 10th congressional district election
Party	Candidate	Votes	%
Republican	Patrick McHenry (incumbent)	190,826	57.0
Democratic	Patsy Keever	144,023	43.0
Total votes		334,849	100.0
Republican hold			

=== 2014 ===
2014 North Carolina's 10th congressional district election
Party	Candidate	Votes	%
Republican	Patrick McHenry (incumbent)	133,504	61.0
Democratic	Tate MacQueen	85,292	39.0
Total votes		218,796	100.0
Republican hold			

=== 2016 ===
2016 North Carolina's 10th congressional district election
Party	Candidate	Votes	%
Republican	Patrick McHenry (incumbent)	220,825	63.1
Democratic	Andy Millard	128,919	36.9
Total votes		349,744	100.0
Republican hold			

=== 2018 ===
2018 North Carolina's 10th congressional district election
Party	Candidate	Votes	%
Republican	Patrick McHenry (incumbent)	164,969	59.3
Democratic	David Wilson Brown	113,259	40.7
Total votes		278,228	100.0
Republican hold			

=== 2020 ===
2020 North Carolina's 10th congressional district election
Party	Candidate	Votes	%
Republican	Patrick McHenry (incumbent)	284,095	68.9
Democratic	David Parker	128,189	31.1
Total votes		412,284	100.0
Republican hold			

=== 2022 ===
2022 North Carolina's 10th congressional district election
Party	Candidate	Votes	%
Republican	Patrick McHenry (incumbent)	194,681	72.59
Democratic	Pam Genant	73,174	27.28
Write-in		352	0.13
Total votes		268,207	100.00
Republican hold			

=== 2024 ===
2024 North Carolina's 10th congressional district election
Party	Candidate	Votes	%
Republican	Pat Harrigan	233,814	57.49
Democratic	Ralph R. Scott, Jr.	155,383	38.21
Libertarian	Steven Feldman	11,614	2.86
Constitution	Todd Helm	5,884	1.45
Total votes		406,695	100.00
Republican hold			

== See also ==
- List of United States congressional districts
- North Carolina's congressional districts
