= Charles R. Fisher =

American marine biologist

Charles R. Fisher "Chuck" is a marine biologist, microbial ecologist, and leader in the field of autotrophic symbiosis in deep sea cold seeps and hydrothermal vents. He is Professor Emeritus and Distinguished Senior Scholar of Biology at Pennsylvania State University. Dr. Fisher has authored/coauthored over 100 publications in journals such as Nature, Oceanography, and PNAS among others. He heads the Fisher Deep-Sea Lab at Penn State, which primarily investigates the physiological ecology of the major chemoautotrophic symbiont-containing fauna in the deep ocean environment. The lab works closely with other interdisciplinary researchers on expeditions to research sites at cold seeps in the Gulf of Mexico and hydrothermal vent sites on the East Pacific Rise, the Juan de Fuca Ridge, and in the Lau back-arc Basin.

== Education and awards ==
- B.S., B.S. Michigan State University, 1976
- M.A., University of California, Santa Barbara, 1981
- Ph.D., University of California, Santa Barbara, 1985

Dr. Fisher was awarded the Department of Interior, Cooperative Conservation Award in 2007 for his work in the Deepwater Program: Investigations of Chemosynthetic Communities on the Lower Continental Slope of the Gulf of Mexico. This project was a mass collaboration between ocean science federal agencies, NOAA, Minerals Management Service (MMS), universities, and private companies to explore and study deep ocean communities in the Gulf of Mexico. The mission of the project was to study and map the habitats in order to develop an approach to manage and protect the rich ecosystems as oil drilling increases
in the gulf.

Fisher was awarded the Penn State Faculty Scholars Medal in Biology in 2004 from the Eberly College of Sciences.

Fisher was awarded the Presidential Young Investigator Award from the National Science Foundation in 1991. This award provides $25,000 per year for 5 years and up to $100,000 annually if PYI funds were matched.

== Research ==
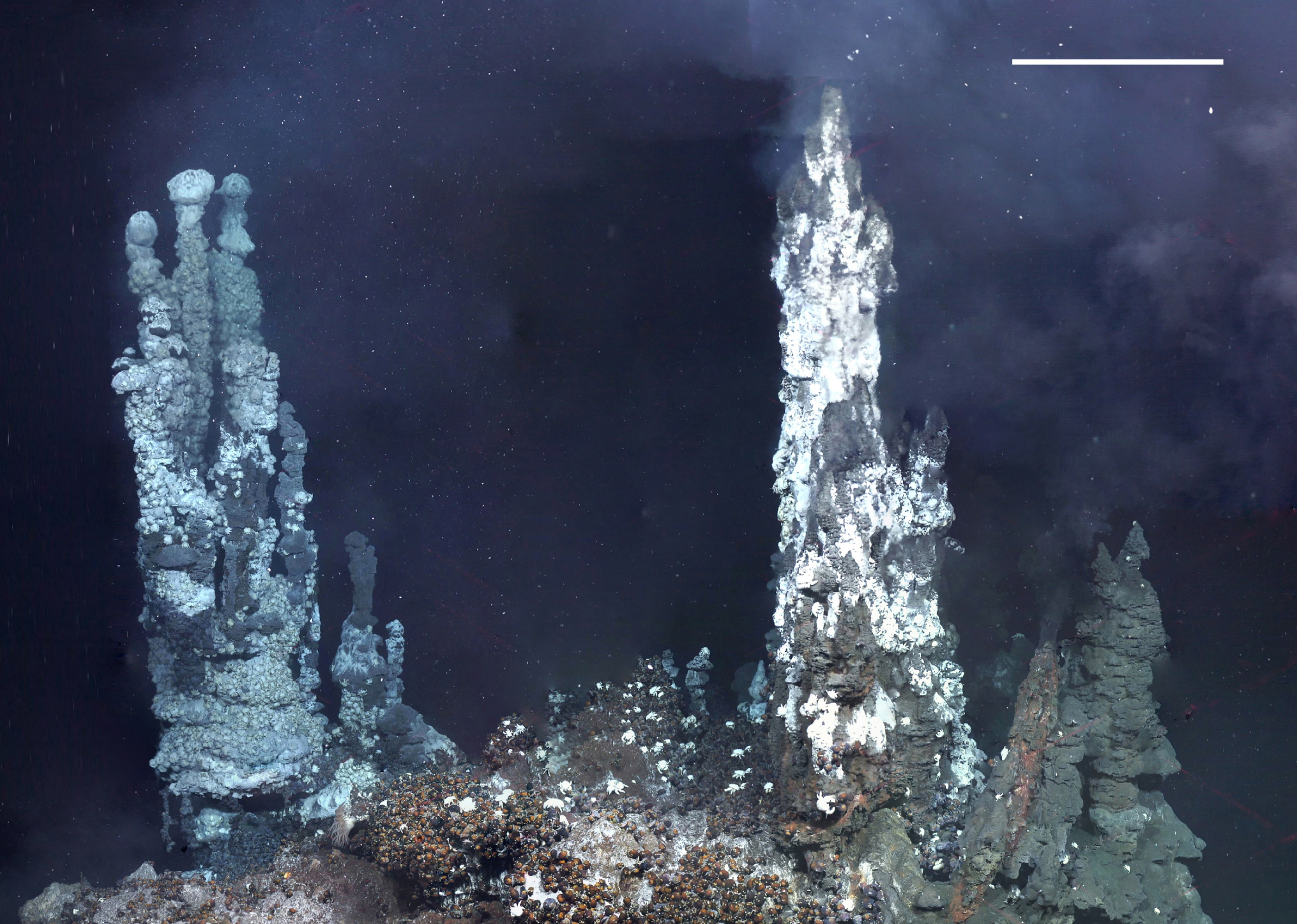
Deep sea vent at East Scotia Ridge

Fisher has published many works pertaining to deep sea ecosystems and physiology, symbioses, and ecology of the animals inhabiting these ecosystems. Fisher has been influential in the study of chemoautotrophic bacterial symbiosis in the deep sea environment. He helped describe the horizontal endosymbiont transmission model in Riftia pachyptila, Oasisia alvinae and Tevnia jerichonana.

Fisher is actively researching damage assessment and recovery of deep sea ecosystems in the Gulf of Mexico after the Deep Water Horizon spill.
