= Charles Frederick Fisher =

American attorney, engineer, and soldier

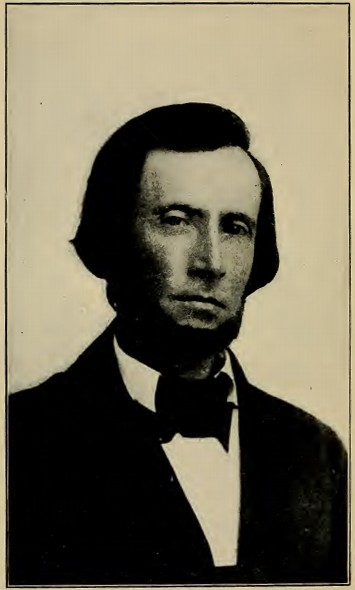
- Born: December 26, 1816; Salisbury, North Carolina, US
- Died: July 21, 1861 (aged 44); Manassas, Virginia, US
- Burial place: Old Lutheran Church Cemetery; Salisbury, North Carolina
- Spouse: Elizabeth Caldwell
- Relatives: Charles Fisher (father)
- Military career
- Allegiance: Confederate States of America
- Branch: Confederate States Army
- Service years: 1861
- Rank: Colonel
- Commands: 6th North Carolina Infantry Regiment
- Conflicts: American Civil War: First Battle of Bull Run †

Charles Frederick Fisher (December 26, 1816 – July 21, 1861) was an American attorney, engineer, and soldier from Salisbury, the county seat of Rowan County, North Carolina. He served as President of the North Carolina Railroad and died in battle as an officer leading the 6th North Carolina regiment of the Confederate States Army.

== Early and family life ==
Fisher was born in Salisbury in 1816 to Christine Beard Fisher and her husband, legislator and plantation owner Charles Fisher. His paternal grandfather, Frederick Fisher, had migrated to western North Carolina from Shenandoah County, Virginia, and had served as an officer in the local militia during the American Revolutionary War. His maternal grandparents were Lewis Beard and Susan Dunn, and his maternal great-grandfather, lawyer John Dunn, was an ardent Tory during that war.

After a local private education, Fisher entered Yale University in 1835, but failed to complete his freshman year. Fisher married Ruth Caldwell (daughter of businessman and legislator from Guilford County, North Carolina, David Caldwell), and they had three children who were reared by relatives after Fisher's death. Although the Fishers were Lutheran or Episcopalian, their orphaned eldest daughter Christine was raised by a Catholic aunt and converted to Catholicism and later become an author of many novels, some supporting the Lost Cause.

== Career ==
Although he never received a formal educational degree, Fisher became farmer, miner, and journalist in his home Rowan County. His father was a politician for 28 years, much of which time Fisher supported him as copublisher of the Western Carolinian. A Democrat, Fisher won his first political office in 1854, when Rowan County voters elected him as a state senator.

The following year, Fisher became president of the North Carolina Railroad, succeeding former governor John Morehead. While still the railroad's president, he was also selected as its principal contractor to build a line to Morganton, North Carolina. Slow construction progress and high costs produced considerable criticism, particularly from Jonathan Worth (businessman, lawyer, Whig legislator and president of the competing Fayetteville and Western Plank Road Company). In 1859, despite Worth's continued criticism, the railroad's stockholders (including Whigs) re-elected Fisher as its president. Fisher became friends with Vermont-born Sewall Lawrence Fremont (née Fish, 1816–1886), a former U.S. Army artilleryman who had become chief engineer and superintendent of the Wilmington and Weldon Railroad in eastern North Carolina in 1854.

== American Civil War ==
During the American Civil War Fisher and Fremont both joined the Confederate States Army. Fisher became a Colonel commanding the 6th North Carolina Infantry Regiment. He died leading a charge on a Union Army battery at the First Battle of Bull Run, supporting North Carolina General Thomas Lanier Clingman as well as Fisher's cousin (who became General after that battle) Jubal Early. Whether the fatal bullet was from friendly fire of the Fourth Alabama or Second or Eleventh Mississippi, or from the New York Zouaves or other Union soldiers from the Sudley Road will never be known.

== Legacy ==
Fisher was buried at the Old Lutheran Cemetery in Salisbury. Propaganda made Fisher an early hero of the Confederacy and later of the Lost Cause. His troops erected a marker where he fell, which was later damaged by souvenir hunters and is now replaced by a U.S. flagpole. His friend S.L. Fremont came to command North Carolina's coastal defense and named Fort Fisher at the mouth of the Cape Fear River for his gallantry. Later, the United Confederate Veterans and Daughters of the Confederacy established memorial markers. North Carolina chief justice Benjamin Franklin White, formerly a Confederate Captain, published a laudatory account of Fisher's death in 1901. His hat is at the North Carolina Museum of History.
