= 1829 Pennsylvania's 16th congressional district special election =

On December 15, 1829, a special election was held in Pennsylvania's 16th congressional district to fill a vacancy caused by the resignation of Representative-elect William Wilkins (AM) on November 9, 1829, prior to the start of the 21st Congress.

== Election results ==
Candidate	Party	Votes	Percent
Harmar Denny	Anti-Masonic	4,208	57.7%
James S. Stevenson	Jacksonian	3,090	42.3%

Denny took his seat on December 30, 1829.

== See also ==
- List of special elections to the United States House of Representatives
