= 1828 Kentucky's 2nd congressional district special election =

A special election was held in Kentucky's 2nd congressional district on August 4, 1828 to fill a vacancy in Kentucky's representation.

== Background ==
In the 1827 elections, Thomas Metcalfe (A) was re-elected to a 5th term and served until June 1, 1828 when he resigned to run for governor.

== Election results ==
Candidate	Party	Votes	Percent
John Chambers	Anti-Jacksonian	3,133	52.7%
Nicholas D. Coleman	Jacksonian	2,815	47.3%

Chambers took his seat on December 1, 1828

== See also ==
- List of special elections to the United States House of Representatives
