= Thomas H. Hall =

American politician (1773–1853)

Thomas H. Hall (June 1773 – June 30, 1853) was a U.S. representative from North Carolina; born in Prince George County, Virginia, in June 1773; studied medicine and practiced in Tarboro, North Carolina; elected as a Democratic-Republican to the Fifteenth Congress and reelected to the three succeeding Congresses (March 4, 1817 – March 3, 1825); unsuccessful candidate for reelection in 1824 to the Nineteenth Congress; elected to the Twentieth Congress and reelected as a Jacksonian to the three succeeding Congresses (March 4, 1827 – March 3, 1835); chairman, Committee on Expenditures in the Department of the Treasury (Twentieth Congress), Committee on Public Expenditures (Twenty-first and Twenty-second Congresses); resumed the practice of medicine and also engaged in agricultural pursuits; member of the State senate in 1836; died in Tarboro, North Carolina, on June 30, 1853; interment in Macnair-Hall Cemetery, near Tarboro, North Carolina.

== See also ==
- Fifteenth United States Congress
- Sixteenth United States Congress
- Seventeenth United States Congress
- Eighteenth United States Congress
- Twentieth United States Congress
- Twenty-first United States Congress
- Twenty-second United States Congress
- Twenty-third United States Congress

U.S. House of Representatives
Preceded by James West Clark	Member of the U.S. House of Representatives from North Carolina's 3rd congressional district March 4, 1817 – March 3, 1823	Succeeded by Charles Hooks
Preceded by Charles Hooks	Member of the U.S. House of Representatives from North Carolina's 5th congressional district March 4, 1823 – March 3, 1825	Succeeded by Gabriel Holmes
Preceded by Richard Hines	Member of the U.S. House of Representatives from North Carolina's 3rd congressional district March 4, 1827 – March 3, 1835	Succeeded by Ebenezer Pettigrew
