= Charles Fisher (North Carolina politician) =

American politician

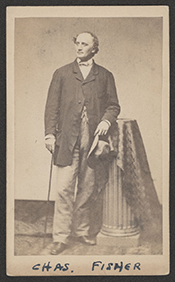

Member of the U.S. House of Representatives from North Carolina's 10th district
- In office February 11, 1819 – March 3, 1821
- Preceded by: George Mumford
- Succeeded by: John Long
- In office March 4, 1839 – March 3, 1841
- Preceded by: Abraham Rencher
- Succeeded by: Abraham Rencher

Personal details
- Born: October 20, 1789 Salisbury, North Carolina, U.S.
- Died: May 7, 1849 (aged 59) Hillsboro, Mississippi, U.S.
- Party: Democratic (1839-1841)
- Other political affiliations: Democratic-Republican (1819-1821)
- Children: Charles Frederick Fisher

Charles Fisher (October 20, 1789 – May 7, 1849) was an American politician and legislator from North Carolina who was twice elected U.S. Representative from his state.

== Biography ==
Born near Salisbury, North Carolina, Fisher was educated by private tutors in Raleigh, North Carolina, studied law and was admitted to the bar but did not practice to any extent. In 1818 Fisher became a member of the North Carolina Senate.

Fisher was elected as a Democratic-Republican to the Fifteenth Congress to fill the vacancy caused by the death of George Mumford in Washington D.C. at the end of 1818. Reelected to the Sixteenth Congress, Fisher served from February 11, 1819, to March 3, 1821, and declined to be a candidate for renomination in 1820.

Returning from three years' experience in the federal legislature, Fisher was elected as a member of the State House of Commons from the Salisbury District in 1821 and served until 1836 (1822-1825 representing Rowan County). Fisher was Speaker of North Carolina House of Commons in the 1830-1831 and 1831-1832 sessions and served as member of the state constitutional convention in 1835.

Fisher was returned to the Twenty-sixth Congress (March 4, 1839 – March 3, 1841), this time as a Democrat. Fisher was not a candidate for renomination in 1840 though he stayed politically active; he was an unsuccessful candidate for election in 1844 to the Twenty-ninth Congress.

== Personal life ==
Fisher married Christiana Beard, daughter of another Salisbury attorney. The pair had four children, one boy who died in infancy, and two girls who both married and lived to adulthood. In 1816, a son was born, Charles Frederick Fisher, who also became a Rowan County political figure for many years and after whose death at the First Battle of Bull Run became the Confederate hero for whom Fort Fisher was eventually named.

The elder Fisher died in Hillsboro, Mississippi during a visit on May 7, 1849.

== Sources ==
- United States Congress. "Charles Fisher (id: F000144)". Biographical Directory of the United States Congress.

U.S. House of Representatives
Preceded by George Mumford	Member of the U.S. House of Representatives from North Carolina's 10th congressional district 1819-1821	Succeeded by John Long
Preceded by Abraham Rencher	Member of the U.S. House of Representatives from North Carolina's 10th congressional district 1839-1841	Succeeded by Abraham Rencher
