= 1829 Pennsylvania's 8th congressional district special election =

A special election was held in Pennsylvania's 8th congressional district on October 13, 1829, to fill two vacancies in the state's congressional delegation before the first session of the 21st Congress.

The vacancies had been caused by the resignations of Samuel D. Ingham (J) who was chosen as U.S. Treasury Secretary and George Wolf (J) who was elected Governor of Pennsylvania

== Election results ==
As the 8th district was a plural district with two seats, both empty, this election sent two people to Congress, bolded here for clarity.

Candidate	Party	Votes	Percent
**Peter Ihrie, Jr.**	**Jacksonian**	**5,602**	**27.2%**
**Samuel A. Smith**	**Jacksonian**	**5,168**	**25.1%**
Nathaniel B. Eldred	Jacksonian	4,993	24.3%
George Harrison	Jacksonian	4,822	23.4%

Ihrie and Smith took their seats on December 7, 1829, the first day of the First Session of the 21st Congress

== See also ==
- List of special elections to the United States House of Representatives
