= Thomas P. Moore =

American politician (1797–1853)

United States Minister to Gran Colombia
- In office September 26, 1829 – April 16, 1833
- Preceded by: William Henry Harrison
- Succeeded by: Robert B. McAfee

Member of the U.S. House of Representatives from Kentucky's 7th district
- In office March 4, 1823 – March 4, 1829
- Preceded by: John Speed Smith
- Succeeded by: John Kincaid

Member of the Kentucky House of Representatives
- In office 1819–1820

Personal details
- Born: Thomas Patrick Moore; 1797 Charlotte County, Virginia, U.S.
- Died: July 21, 1853 (aged 55–56) Harrodsburg, Kentucky, U.S.
- Party: Democratic-Republican

Thomas Patrick Moore (1797 – July 21, 1853) was a U.S. representative from Kentucky.

Born in Charlotte County, Virginia, Moore attended the common schools. He moved with his parents to Harrodsburg, Kentucky. He attended Transylvania University, Lexington, Kentucky. He served in the War of 1812. He served as captain in the Twelfth Virginia Infantry March 12, 1812 and a major in the Eighteenth Infantry September 20, 1813. He was honorably discharged on June 15, 1815. He served as member of the Kentucky House of Representatives in 1819 and 1820. He owned slaves.

Moore was elected as a Jackson Democratic-Republican to the Eighteenth Congress and re-elected as a Jacksonian candidate to the Nineteenth, and Twentieth Congresses (March 4, 1823 – March 4, 1829). He served as chairman of the Committee on Revisal and Unfinished Business (Nineteenth Congress).

He was appointed by President Andrew Jackson as Minister Plenipotentiary to Gran Colombia March 13, 1829, and served until April 16, 1833. He returned to Kentucky.

He was presented credentials as a member-elect to the Twenty-third Congress, but the election was contested by Robert P. Letcher and the House declared a new election necessary. He was appointed lieutenant colonel of the 3rd U.S. Dragoons in the war with Mexico and served from March 3, 1847, to July 31, 1848. He served as delegate to the Kentucky constitutional convention in 1849 and 1850.

He died in Harrodsburg, Kentucky, July 21, 1853.

U.S. House of Representatives
Preceded by John Speed Smith	Member of the U.S. House of Representatives from Kentucky's 7th congressional district March 4, 1823 – March 4, 1829	Succeeded by John Kincaid
Diplomatic posts
Preceded by William Henry Harrison	United States Minister to Colombia; 26 September 1829 – 16 April 1833	Succeeded by Robert B. McAfee
