= John Kincaid (politician) =

American politician

Thomas P. Moore

Member of the U.S. House of Representatives from Kentucky's 7th district
- In office March 4, 1829 – March 3, 1831
- Preceded by: Thomas P. Moore
- Succeeded by: John Adair

Member of the Kentucky House of Representatives
- In office 1836–1837
- In office 1819

Personal details
- Born: February 15, 1791 Danville, Kentucky, U.S.
- Died: February 7, 1873 (aged 81) Gallatin, Tennessee, U.S.
- Party: Jacksonian

John Kincaid (February 15, 1791 – February 7, 1873) was a United States representative from Kentucky. He was born near Danville, Kentucky, where he attended the public schools. He studied law, was admitted to the bar and commenced practice in Stanford, Kentucky.

Kincaid served as a Kentucky Commonwealth attorney. He was also a member of the Kentucky House of Representatives in 1819. He was elected as a Jacksonian to the Twenty-first Congress (March 4, 1829 – March 3, 1831). After leaving Congress, he was again a member of the Kentucky House of Representatives in 1836 and 1837. He served as circuit judge in 1836 and 1837 and then resumed the practice of law and also engaged in agricultural pursuits, He moved to Gallatin, Tennessee, in 1870 and died there on February 7, 1873. Kincaid was buried in Bellevue Cemetery, Danville, Kentucky.

U.S. House of Representatives
| Preceded by Thomas P. Moore | Member of the U.S. House of Representatives from Kentucky's 7th congressional district 1829-1831 | Succeeded by John Adair |
