= Richard Hines =

American politician

Richard Hines (June 25, 1792 – November 20, 1851) was a U.S. representative from North Carolina; born in Tarboro, North Carolina on June 25, 1792; studied law; was admitted to the bar in 1816 and practiced in Raleigh, North Carolina; member of the state house of commons, 1824; elected to the Nineteenth Congress (March 4, 1825 – March 3, 1827); unsuccessful candidate for reelection in 1826 to the Twentieth Congress; resumed the practice of law in Raleigh, N.C., and died there November 20, 1851; interment in the Old City Cemetery, Raleigh, N.C.

== See also ==
- Nineteenth United States Congress

U.S. House of Representatives
Preceded by Thomas H. Hall	Member of the U.S. House of Representatives from North Carolina's 3rd congressional district 1825–1827	Succeeded by Thomas H. Hall
