= Abraham Rencher =

American politician

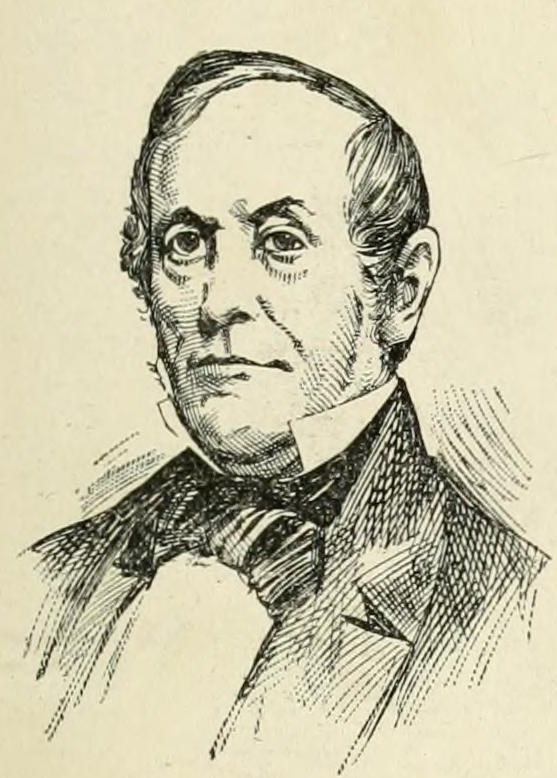
- Abraham Rencher, New Mexico Territory Governor.

4th Governor of New Mexico Territory
- In office August 17, 1857 – May 24, 1861
- Appointed by: James Buchanan
- Preceded by: David Meriwether
- Succeeded by: Henry Connelly

Member of the U.S. House of Representatives from North Carolina's 10th district
- In office March 4, 1829 – March 3, 1839
- Preceded by: John Long
- Succeeded by: Charles Fisher
- In office March 4, 1841 – March 3, 1843
- Preceded by: Charles Fisher
- Succeeded by: District eliminated

Personal details
- Born: August 12, 1798 Near Raleigh, North Carolina
- Died: July 6, 1883 (aged 84) Chapel Hill, North Carolina
- Resting place: St. Bartholomew's Protestant Episcopal Churchyard, Pittsboro, North Carolina
- Party: Whig
- Spouse: Louisa Mary Jones (m. 1836)
- Children: 4
- Education: University of North Carolina at Chapel Hill
- Profession: Lawyer

Abraham Rencher (August 12, 1798 – July 6, 1883) was a politician from the state of North Carolina. His career included: U.S. representative; chargé d'affaires to Portugal; and governor of New Mexico Territory.

== Biography ==
Rencher was born near Raleigh, North Carolina on August 12, 1798 to John Grant, the county sheriff, and Ann (Nelson) Rencher. He was tutored at home, and attended the common schools and Pittsboro Academy. He graduated from the University of North Carolina at Chapel Hill in 1822, studied law with Frederick Nash, was admitted to the bar in 1825, and commenced practice in Pittsboro, North Carolina.

He was elected as a Jacksonian to the Twenty-first and Twenty-second Congresses, as an Anti-Jacksonian to the Twenty-third and Twenty-fourth Congresses, and as a Whig to the Twenty-fifth Congress, serving from March 4, 1829, to March 3, 1839. He declined to be a candidate for renomination in 1838.

In 1840 Rencher was again elected to Congress as a Whig, and he served one term, March 4, 1841, to March 3, 1843 (the Twenty-seventh Congress). He declined to be candidate for renomination in 1842 on the grounds of ill health.

Rencher served as U.S. Chargé d'affaires to Portugal from 1843 to 1847, appointed by President John Tyler.

From August 17, 1857 to May 24, 1861 Rencher served as Governor of New Mexico Territory, appointed by President Buchanan. Rencher had previously declined Buchanan's suggestion to become Secretary of the navy, lobbying instead for the Governor position. He was appointed on August 17, 1857, and arrived in Santa Fe on November 11. While in office Rencher clashed with the military and was critical of their campaign against the Indians. Rencher was successful in passing legislation requiring all children to attend school. He also lowered the territory's debt significantly. He was a slaveholder and in 1859, he signed legislation defining and protecting the status of slaves as property. However, at the beginning of the Civil War Rencher remained loyal to the Union and raised regiments to defend the territory. President Abraham Lincoln did not reappoint Rencher, and he left office in August 1861.

After leaving New Mexico Rencher returned to his home in Pittsboro, where he lived in retirement. He was a supporter of the Union and took no active part in the Civil War.

He died in Chapel Hill, North Carolina on July 6, 1883, and was interred at St. Bartholomew's Protestant Episcopal Churchyard in Pittsboro.

== Family ==
In 1836 Rencher married Louisa Mary Jones, daughter of Colonel Edward and Elizabeth Mallett Jones. They had four children.

U.S. House of Representatives
Preceded by John Long	Member of the U.S. House of Representatives from North Carolina's 10th congressional district 1829–1839	Succeeded by Charles Fisher
Preceded by Charles Fisher	Member of the U.S. House of Representatives from North Carolina's 10th congressional district 1841–1843	Succeeded by District inactive
