= John Long (North Carolina politician) =

American politician

John Long (February 26, 1785 – August 11, 1857) was a North Carolina politician who served four terms (1821–1829) in the U.S. House of Representatives.

Long also served one term (1811–12) in the North Carolina House of Commons and one term (1814–15) in the North Carolina Senate.

John Long was born in Loudoun County, Virginia on February 26, 1785. He married Sabra Shepard Ramsey on May 6, 1807, in Cumberland County, North Carolina. Long died on August 11, 1857.

U.S. House of Representatives
Preceded by Charles Fisher	Member of the U.S. House of Representatives from North Carolina's 10th congressional district 1821–1829	Succeeded by Abraham Rencher
