= Joshua W. Hathaway =

American judge (1797–1862)

Joshua Warren Hathaway (November 10, 1797 – June 6, 1862), was a justice of the Maine Supreme Judicial Court from May 11, 1852, to May 10, 1859.

Born in the Colony of New Brunswick, Hathaway graduated from Bowdoin College in 1820 and read law to be admitted to the bar in 1824. He resided in Bangor, Maine, and represented Hancock County, Maine in the Maine Senate for a short time, before he was appointed judge of District Court in 1848. He served in that capacity until 1852, when he was appointed to the Maine Supreme Judicial Court by Governor John Hubbard.

Hathaway died at his home in Bangor, Maine, at the age of 64.

Legal offices
| New seat | Justice of the Maine Supreme Judicial Court; 1852–1859 | Succeeded by Edward Kent |
