= Senator Johnson =

Senator Johnson may refer to:

== Members of the Bahamian Senate ==
- Doris Sands Johnson (1921–1983), Bahamian Senator from 1967 to 1983

== Members of the Canadian Senate ==
- Janis Johnson (born 1946), Canadian Senator from Manitoba from 1990 to 2016

== Members of the Confederate States Senate ==
- Herschel Vespasian Johnson (1812–1880), Confederate States Senator from Georgia from 1863 to 1865
- Waldo P. Johnson (1817–1885), Confederate States Senator from Missouri from 1863 to 1865

== Members of the Liberian Senate ==
- Elijah Johnson (agent) (c. 1789–1849), former president pro tempore of the Senate of Liberia
- Prince Johnson (born 1952), Liberian Senator from Nimba County since 2006

== Members of the United States Senate ==
- Andrew Johnson (1808–1875), U.S. Senator from Tennessee from 1857 to 1862 and in 1875
- Charles Fletcher Johnson (1859–1930), U.S. Senator from Maine from 1911 to 1917
- Edwin C. Johnson (1884–1970), U.S. Senator from Colorado from 1937 to 1955
- Edwin S. Johnson (1857–1933), U.S. Senator from South Dakota from 1915 to 1921
- Henry Johnson (Louisiana politician) (1783–1864), U.S. Senator from Louisiana from 1818 to 1824
- Herschel Vespasian Johnson (1812–1880), U.S. Senator from Georgia from 1848 to 1849
- Hiram Johnson (1866–1945), U.S. Senator from California from 1917 to 1945
- Lyndon B. Johnson (1908–1973), U.S. Senator from Texas from 1949 to 1961
- Magnus Johnson (1871–1936), U.S. Senator from Minnesota from 1923 to 1925
- Martin N. Johnson (1850–1909), U.S. Senator from North Dakota in 1909
- Reverdy Johnson (1796–1876), U.S. Senator from Maryland from 1863 to 1868
- Richard Mentor Johnson (1780–1850), U.S. Senator from Kentucky from 1819 to 1829
- Robert Ward Johnson (1814–1879), U.S. Senator from Arkansas from 1853 to 1861
- Ron Johnson (born 1955), U.S. Senator from Wisconsin since 2011
- Tim Johnson (South Dakota politician) (1946–2024), U.S. Senator from South Dakota from 1997 to 2015
- Waldo P. Johnson (1817–1885), U.S. Senator from Missouri from 1861 to 1862
- William Samuel Johnson (1727–1819), U.S. Senator from Connecticut from 1789 to 1791

== United States state senate members ==
=== Arizona State Senate ===
- Karen Johnson (Arizona politician) (fl. 1990s–2000s)

=== Arkansas State Senate ===
- Blake Johnson (Arkansas politician) (fl. 2010s–2020s)
- Bob Johnson (Arkansas state senator) (born 1962)
- David Johnson (Arkansas politician) (fl. 2000s–2010s)
- James D. Johnson (1924–2010)
- Mark Johnson (Arkansas politician) (fl. 2010s–2020s)

=== California State Senate ===
- George A. Johnson (1829–1894)
- Grove L. Johnson (1841–1926)
- Harold T. Johnson (1907–1988)
- James A. Johnson (California politician) (1829–1896)
- Ray E. Johnson (1911–1993)
- Ross Johnson (politician) (1939–2017)

=== Colorado State Senate ===
- Donna R. Johnson (born 1934)
- Steve Johnson (Colorado politician) (born 1960)

=== Connecticut State Senate ===
- Nancy Johnson (born 1935)

=== Florida State Senate ===
- Beth Johnson (American politician) (1909–1973)
- Bob Johnson (Florida politician) (1934–2015)
- Dewey M. Johnson (1917–1989)
- Elisha G. Johnson (died 1875)
- J. B. Johnson (Florida politician) (1868–1940)
- Karen Johnson (Florida politician) (1943–2025)

=== Georgia State Senate ===
- B. Ed Johnson (1914–1983)
- Don Johnson Jr. (born 1948)
- Eric Johnson (Georgia politician) (born 1953)
- Leroy Johnson (Georgia politician) (1928–2019)

=== Idaho State Senate ===
- Dan G. Johnson (fl. 2010s)

=== Illinois State Senate ===
- Adriane Johnson (fl. 2020s)
- Christine J. Johnson (born 1953)
- Tom Johnson (Illinois politician) (1945–2018)

=== Indiana State Senate ===
- Tyler Johnson (politician) (fl. 2020s)

=== Iowa State Senate ===
- David Johnson (Iowa politician) (born 1950)

=== Kentucky State Senate ===
- Ben Johnson (Kentucky politician) (1858–1950)
- James Johnson (Kentucky politician) (1774–1826)
- Thomas Johnson (Kentucky politician) (1812–1906)

=== Louisiana State Senate ===
- A. R. Johnson (1856–1933)

=== Maine State Senate ===
- Chris Johnson (Maine politician) (fl. 2010s)

=== Maryland State Senate ===
- Reverdy Johnson (1796–1876)
- Thomas Francis Johnson (1909–1988)

=== Michigan State Senate ===
- Bert Johnson (Michigan politician) (born 1973)
- Daniel Johnson (Michigan politician) (1821–1860)
- Ransom C. Johnson (1849–1904)
- Ruth Johnson (born 1955)
- Shirley Johnson (1937–2021)

=== Minnesota State Senate ===
- Alice Johnson (politician) (born 1941)
- Dave Johnson (Minnesota politician) (born 1963)
- Dean Johnson (politician) (born 1947)
- Debbie Johnson (politician) (born 1957)
- Janet Johnson (politician) (1940–1999)
- John A. Johnson (Minnesota politician) (1883–1962)
- John Albert Johnson (1861–1909)
- Mark Johnson (Minnesota politician) (fl. 2010s–2020s)
- Robert George Johnson (1925–1969)

=== Mississippi State Senate ===
- Chris Johnson (Mississippi politician) (born 1978)
- Timothy L. Johnson (born 1959)

=== Missouri State Senate ===
- John J. Johnson (1926–2016)

=== Nebraska State Senate ===
- E. Thome Johnson (1905–1984)
- Fred Gustus Johnson (1876–1951)
- Jerry Johnson (politician) (born 1942)
- Joel T. Johnson (1936–2026)
- Lowell Johnson (1920–2009)
- Rod Johnson (Nebraska politician) (born 1957)
- Roy W. Johnson (politician) (1882–1947)
- Vard Johnson (born 1939)
- Walter R. Johnson (1897–1974)

=== New Hampshire State Senate ===
- James Hutchins Johnson (1802–1887)

=== New Jersey State Senate ===
- Gordon M. Johnson (born 1949)
- James A. C. Johnson (1867–1937)
- William M. Johnson (1847–1928)

=== New York State Senate ===
- Craig M. Johnson (born 1971)
- Daniel Johnson (New York politician) (1790–1875)
- George Y. Johnson (1820–1872)
- Noadiah Johnson (1795–1839)
- Owen H. Johnson (1929–2014)
- Robert E. Johnson (New York politician) (1909–1995)
- Stephen C. Johnson (state senator) (fl. 1840s)
- William Elting Johnson (1837–1912)
- William Johnson (politician, born 1821) (1821–1875)

=== North Carolina State Senate ===
- Charles Johnson (North Carolina politician) (died 1802)
- Todd Johnson (politician) (born 1970s)

=== Ohio State Senate ===
- Anice Johnson (1919–1992)
- Bruce Johnson (Ohio politician) (born 1960)
- Calvin C. Johnson (born 1929)
- Jeff Johnson (Ohio politician) (born 1958)
- John Johnson (Ohio congressman) (1805–1867)
- Terry Johnson (Ohio politician) (born 1956)

=== Oklahoma State Senate ===
- Constance N. Johnson (born 1952)
- Jed Johnson (Oklahoma politician) (1888–1963)
- Mike Johnson (Oklahoma politician) (born 1944)

=== Oregon State Senate ===
- Betsy Johnson (born 1951)

=== South Carolina State Senate ===
- Kevin L. Johnson (born 1960)
- Michael Johnson (South Carolina politician) (born 1970)

=== South Dakota State Senate ===
- John B. Johnson (politician) (1885–1985)
- Robert A. Johnson (South Dakota politician) (1921–2014)

=== Tennessee State Senate ===
- Jack Johnson (American politician) (born 1968)

=== Texas State Senate ===
- Eddie Bernice Johnson (born 1935)
- Nathan Johnson (politician) (born 1968)

=== Utah State Senate ===
- John D. Johnson (politician) (fl. 2020s)

=== Vermont State Senate ===
- Joseph B. Johnson (1893–1986)

=== Virginia State Senate ===
- Chapman Johnson (1779–1849)

=== Washington State Senate ===
- Doris Johnson (1923–2021)

=== West Virginia State Senate ===
- Daniel D. Johnson (1836–1893)
- Okey Johnson (1834–1903)

=== Wisconsin State Senate ===
- Bruce Johnson (Wisconsin politician) (1875–1932)
- John Anders Johnson (1832–1901)
- La Tonya Johnson (born 1972)
- Olaf H. Johnson (1892–1966)
- Otis Wells Johnson (1855–1926)
- Raymond C. Johnson (1936–1979)

=== Wyoming State Senate ===
- Wayne Johnson (Wyoming politician) (born 1942)

== See also ==
- Senator Johnston (disambiguation)
