= Robert McDonald Jones =

Choctaw politician (1808–1872)

Robert M. Jones
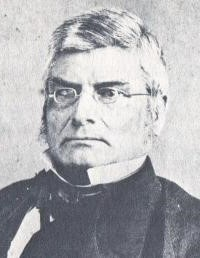

Delegate to the C.S. House of Representatives from the Choctaw and Chickasaw's at-large district
- In office February 18, 1862 – February 18, 1864
- Preceded by: Constituency established
- Succeeded by: Constituency abolished

Personal details
- Born: October 1, 1808 Choctaw Nation (present-day Mississippi, U.S.)
- Died: February 22, 1872 (aged 63) Hugo, Indian Territory
- Resting place: Rose Hill, Oklahoma, U.S.

Robert McDonald Jones (October 1, 1808 – February 22, 1872) was a Choctaw senator and prominent Confederate politician. He was born in Mississippi and later relocated to Indian Territory. He was educated at the Choctaw Academy in Blue Springs, Kentucky, where he received a diploma signed by future Vice President Richard Mentor Johnson. During the removal of the Choctaw to Indian Territory, he accepted a contract and worked as translator for the United States to the tribe. He also led a removal party that included a large party of livestock. After removal, Jones opened several trading posts along the Red River. In addition to stores, Jones ran several large plantations, growing cotton and several other crops. In 1849, Jones exported 700 bales of cotton, which he shipped to New Orleans in one of his two steamships (RM Jones and Frances). Jones built two sprawling mansions on his plantations Lake West and Rose Hill, complete with luxurious furnishings from around the world. According to the 1860 census, Jones owned over 230 slaves, though some have argued that he owned as many as 500.

At the outbreak of the American Civil War, Jones argued vehemently for secession and an alliance between the Choctaw and the Confederacy. He represented the Choctaw nation in the 1st Confederate States Congress from 1862 to 1864. Following the war, he served as a Choctaw delegate in Washington D.C. in negotiating the treaty of 1866 between the Choctaw and the United States. However, he refused to sign the treaty and left before it was complete.

He died from malaria in 1872 and was buried outside his Rose Hill estate alongside several of his children who died in infancy and his second wife, Susan Colbert Jones. Rose Hill later burned, destroying much of his letters and papers. In 1933, a dedication of the Jones graveyard, including the installation of a brick wall with the stones from the house, was performed by the Oklahoma Historical Society.

Confederate States House of Representatives
New constituency	Delegate to the C.S. House of Representatives from the Choctaw's At-large congressional district 1862–1864	Constituency abolished
