= Senator Symens =

Senator Symens may refer to:

- Marsha Symens (fl. 2020s), South Dakota State Senate
- Paul N. Symens (born 1943), South Dakota State Senate

== See also ==
- Senator Simmons (disambiguation)
