= Senator Jansen =

Senator Jansen or Janssen may refer to:

- Mark Jansen (politician) (fl. 2000s–2010s), Michigan State Senate
- Peter Jansen (politician) (1852–1923), Nebraska State Senate
- Charlie Janssen (born 1971), Nebraska State Senate
- Jack Janssen (1923–2013), Kansas State Senate
- Ray Janssen (1937–2022), Nebraska State Senate
