= Vice President Johnson =

Vice President Johnson may refer to:

- Richard Mentor Johnson (1780–1850), 9th vice president of the United States
- Andrew Johnson (1808–1875), 16th vice president of the United States
- Lyndon B. Johnson (1908–1973), 37th vice president of the United States
