= Barry Reutzel =

American politician

Member of the Nebraska Legislature from the 15th district
- In office January 5, 1977 – January 7, 1981
- Preceded by: E. Thome Johnson
- Succeeded by: Lowell Johnson

Personal details
- Born: March 2, 1951 (age 75) Omaha, Nebraska
- Party: Democratic
- Education: Midland College; University of Nebraska–Lincoln (B.A.)

Barry Reutzel (born March 2, 1951) is a Democratic politician from Nebraska who served as a member of the Nebraska Legislature from the 15th district from 1977 to 1981.

== Early life ==
Reutzel was born in Omaha, Nebraska, in 1951. He attended Midland College, and graduated from the University of Nebraska–Lincoln with his bachelor's degree in political science. After graduation, Reutzel worked for his family's business in Fremont, the R. E. Reutzel Company, a pipeline construction company.

== Nebraska Legislature ==
In 1976, Reutzel announced that he would run for the legislature in the 15th district. Several weeks after Reutzel announced his campaign, incumbent State Senator E. Thome Johnson announced that he would not seek a third term. In the nonpartisan primary, Reutzel faced Rupert Dunklau, a bank executive, and Rodney Koyen, a farmer and businessman. Dunklau narrowly placed first in the primary, winning 39 percent of the vote to Reutzel's 36 percent and Koyen's 24 percent. They advanced to the general election, where Reutzel narrowly defeated Dunklau, winning 51–49 percent.

Reutzel ran for re-election in 1980, and was challenged by Lowell Johnson, a businessman and former field representative for Congressman Charles Thone. In the primary election, Reutzel won 55 percent of the vote to Johnson's 45 percent, and they advanced to the general election. Reutzel, a Democrat, was targeted by the Nebraska Republican Party for defeat, and ended up losing to Johnson by a wide margin, receiving just 43 percent of the vote to Johnson's 57 percent.

== Post-legislative career ==
After leaving the legislature, Reutzel rejoined the family business, registered as a lobbyist, and worked for the Nebraska Chiropractic Physicians Association and the Nebraska Aviation Trade Association.

Johnson declined to seek re-election to the legislature in 1992, and Reutzel ran to succeed him. In the primary, he ran against businessman Don Claasen, grocer Ray Janssen, student David Morris, attorney Richard Register, and compliance specialist John Schauer. Reutzel placed fifth in the primary, winning 12 percent of the vote to Janssen's 28 percent and Claasen's 22 percent.

In 2010, former State Senator John DeCamp started a radio station to appeal to senior citizens, and Reutzel was hired as the communications director.
