= Ross Rasmussen =

American politician (1917–2010)

Member of the Nebraska Legislature
- In office January 3, 1961 – November 25, 1968
- Preceded by: Ray Simmons
- Succeeded by: E. Thome Johnson
- Constituency: 11th district (1961–1965); 15th district (1965–1968)

Personal details
- Born: January 24, 1917 Lincoln, Nebraska
- Died: March 24, 2010 (aged 93) Fremont, Nebraska
- Party: Democratic
- Spouse: Alice Willa Hoegemeyer (m. 1943)
- Children: 3 (Ruth Ann, Janice Kay, Nina Beth)
- Education: University of Nebraska
- Occupation: Farmer, agricultural researcher
- Awards: Bronze Star Medal

Military service
- Allegiance: United States
- Branch/service: United States Army
- Years of service: 1942–1946

Ross H. Rasmussen (January 24, 1917 – March 24, 2010) was a Democratic politician and farmer from Nebraska who served as a member of the Nebraska Legislature from 1961 to 1968. He was the 1966 Democratic nominee for Lieutenant Governor.

== Early life ==
Rasmussen was born in Lincoln, Nebraska, in 1917, and attended Bristow High School and Blair High School. He then attended the University of Nebraska, graduating from the College of Agriculture in 1942. He served in the U.S. Army during World War II, and was stationed in Europe, earning a Bronze Star. Upon returning to Nebraska, Rasmussen took up farming, raising cattle and growing grass seeds. He received a patent for bluegrass turf, the second one ever issued by the U.S. Patent and Trademark Office.

In 1958, Rasmussen ran for the Dodge County Board of Supervisors from the 5th district, and won the Democratic nomination unopposed. In the general election, he defeated incumbent Republican Supervisor Howard P. Johnson, who was seeking re-election.

== Nebraska Legislature ==
In 1960, State Senator Ray Simmons declined to seek re-election to a third term, and Rasmussen ran to succeed him in the 11th district, which included Dodge and Washington counties. In the nonpartisan primary, Rasmussen faced former Fremont City Councilman Nick Neff and former Washington County Attorney Walter Huber. Rasmussen placed second in the primary, winning 33 percent of the vote to Neff's 39 percent and Huber's 28 percent. Neff and Rasmussen advanced to the general election, where Rasmussen defeated Neff, winning 57–43 percent.

Rasmussen was considered a potential candidate for Congress in 1962 from the 1st district, but ultimately declined to run, instead opting to seek re-election. No candidates filed to run against him, but shortly before the primary election, businessman Richard Wiechman filed to run as a write-in candidate. Rasmussen placed first in the primary election, receiving 70 percent of the vote, and Wiechman placed second, winning 2,309 votes, earning a spot on the general election ballot. Rasmussen only narrowly defeated Wiechman in the general election, receiving 51 percent of the vote to his 49 percent.

In 1964, following redistricting, Rasmussen ran for re-election in the 15th district, which included only Dodge County. He was challenged by Wilmer Westphal, a public relations official with the Brotherhood of Railroad Trainmen, and farmer Orville Von Seggern. Rasmussen placed first in the primary election, winning 47 percent of the vote to Von Seggern's 33 percent and Westphal's 20 percent. Rasmussen and Von Seggern advanced to the general election, where Rasmussen narrowly defeated Von Seggern, winning 52–48 percent.

Rasmussen ran for Lieutenant Governor in 1966, and faced Hazeldeane Carpenter, the wife of State Senator Terry Carpenter, in the Democratic primary. Rasmussen defeated Carpenter in the primary in a landslide, winning 66 percent of the vote to her 34 percent. In the general election, he ran against businessman John Everroad, the Republican nominee. Everroad defeated Rasmussen by a wide margin, receiving 61 percent of the vote to Rasmussen's 39 percent.

In 1968, Rasmussen ran for re-election, and was challenged by Dodge County Supervisor E. Thome Johnson and former Fremont Mayor Win Menninger. Rasmussen narrowly placed third in the primary election, receiving 42 votes less than Johnson.

After Johnson won the general election, Rasmussen announced that he would resign from the legislature. He cited the legislature's special December session, and urged Governor Norbert Tiemann to appoint Johnson as his successor so he could serve in the session. Rasmussen resigned upon the certification of the election results on November 25, 1968.

== Post-legislative career ==
In 1968, after losing the primary election, Rasmussen was appointed as the executive director of the Nebraska School Board Association, serving until 1980.

Rasmussen ran for the Dodge County Board of Supervisors in 1986, challenging incumbent Republican Supervisor Loell Strand. He lost the Democratic primary to Albert Wisnieski. He subsequently announced that he would likely not run for office again, and returned to farming, developing a new hybrid grass.

== Death ==
Rasmussen died on March 24, 2010.
