= Senator Simmons =

Senator Simmons may refer to:

== Members of the United States Senate ==
- F. M. Simmons (1854–1940), U.S. Senator from North Carolina from 1901 to 1931
- James F. Simmons (1795–1864), U.S. Senator from Rhode Island from 1841 to 1847 and from 1857 to 1862

== United States state senate members ==
- David Simmons (Florida politician) (born 1952), Florida State Senate
- Derrick Simmons (politician) (born 1976), Mississippi State Senate
- Mike Simmons (born 1983), Illinois State Senate
- Ray Simmons (1924–2002), Nebraska State Senate
- Thomas J. Simmons (1837–1905), Georgia State Senate

== See also ==
- Senator Symens (disambiguation)
