= Choctaw Academy =

American Indian school, Kentucky (1818–1842)

Coordinates: 38.231932°N 84.634177°W

The Choctaw Academy was a historic Indian school at Blue Spring in Scott County, Kentucky, for Choctaw students. It existed from 1825 to 1848.

The Academy was founded after a land agreement between U.S. Representative, and future Vice-President, Richard Mentor Johnson and Choctaw tribal leaders for the location of the school was approved by the Choctaw National Council. It would officially open in 1825 and was the first school for Native-Americans funded by the Federal Government. In total the school would have more than 600 total students throughout its lifespan.

== History ==
Following the American Revolution the Choctaws, and other south-eastern tribes, would come to adopt many aspects of Anglo-American culture which would eventually lead to them being considered one of the Five Civilized Tribes. By the early 1820's the Choctaw Nation would begin planning for the establishment of a European style academy to educate members.

From 1818 to 1821 U.S. Representative and future Vice-President Richard Mentor Johnson operated a small missionary school on property he owned. When he found out about the Choctaw plans to establish an academy, he would use his connections as a landowner to convince Tribal leaders that his plantation in Scott County, Kentucky would be an ideal location for the school, the Choctaw National Council agreed to build the school there. The school would open in 1825 with 25 students and was the first Indian School to receive funding from the Federal government.

The school is grouped with the Baptist evangelistic movement due to a small school opened by Thomas Henderson, a Baptist minister, which acted as such a place for Choctaw children. However, The Choctaw Academy eventually grew beyond that title and became a great education center for Indian children across many tribes. The degree to which the school was similar to later Indian Boarding schools is debated. Choctaw tribal historian Dr. Ian Thompson argued the school was founded with support of the Choctaw nation and stated, "It’s not necessarily that European training was better but they were trying to learn that way so they could interact with them and understand them.”, however historian Christina Synder argued that the school was outright assimilationist.

The school would eventually take in many students outside the Choctaw tribe and the Five Civilized Tribes, some students came from far western tribes such as the Dakota and Iowa and the school was around 20% white, growing far beyond initially planned. Additionally in one incident two students would force their way into Johnson's house before being stopped, Johnson feared they were attempting to rape his daughters. For these reasons a substantial three-story stone building was constructed on Johnson's White Sulphur Springs property farther from his house. The new building was likely constructed by Irish laborers, as the Dry stone architecture is a hallmark of such a background in the bluegrass region of Kentucky. 9 students and the academy manager would die when the Asiatic cholera pandemic reached the school.

At its height and under new federal leadership, Rep. Johnson, the school took in over 100 students of many tribes outside of the Choctaw also including the Creek, Chickasaw, Miami, and Potawatomi. One source states that in total more than 600 students from 16 tribes, and some non-natives, attended the school.

== Closure and preservation of site ==
Under the Indian Removal Act of 1830, most Choctaw were forced by the US to move to Indian Territory (now Oklahoma) west of the Mississippi River. The Federal Government began refocusing Indian education on Trades and Manuel labor instead of typical classical education offered at academies, a change the Choctaw disapproved of. In 1840 the superintendent of Choctaw Schools Peter Pitchlynn, who was involved in the founding of the school as a young man, found in an inspection that the school was in poor condition and offered an inadequate education. The War Department made Pitchlynn superintendent of the school the following year, realizing that he couldn't close the school due to the large non-Choctaw student base, Pitchlynn decided to sever all ties between the Choctaw and the school in 1842 when various reservation schools were founded at their new location, including Spencer Academy. The school would finally close in 1848.

Long abandoned, by 2017 the stone Choctaw Academy building was dilapidated, and the roof was caving in. Private fundraising was started in Kentucky to save the 1825 building, and the Choctaw Nation of Oklahoma's Chahta Foundation made a grant for preservation and helped fund the construction a protective shelter around the building as it awaits restoration.

The Academy ruins are on land owned by a local ophthalmologist who has been trying to secure funding for a restoration of the Academy since 2007. A leasing agreement with the county museum was made in 2012 but fell through in 2026 after a lack of progress in receiving funding for building repairs. Despite this an attempt to gain National Historic Landmark status is ongoing.

== Notable alumni and faculty ==
- Julia Chinn, wife/slave of Vice President Johnson, manager of the Choctaw Academy,
- John Tecumseh Jones, interpreter, Baptist minister, businessman, friend of John Brown and founder of Ottawa University in Kansas
- Robert Ward Johnson, US Senator from Arkansas, Confederacy supporter
- Robert McDonald Jones, Choctaw tribal member, businessman, Confederate politician
- Joel Barrow, first Native American physician.
- Israel Folsom, Choctaw Chief.

== In popular culture ==
The Academy is featured in the 2021 novel Great Crossing, by Judalon de Bornay.
