= 1966 Nebraska lieutenant gubernatorial election =

- November 8, 1966

Nominee	John Everroad	Ross Rasmussen
Party	Republican	Democratic
Popular vote	285,163	181,486
Percentage	61.1%	38.9%
- County results Everroad: 50–60% 60–70% 70–80% 80–90% Rasmussen: 50–60% Tie: 40–50%
Lieutenant Governor before election
Philip Sorensen
Democratic
Elected Lieutenant Governor
John Everroad
Republican

The 1966 Nebraska lieutenant gubernatorial election was held on November 8, 1966, and featured political newcomer John Everroad, a Republican, defeating Democratic nominee Ross Rasmussen, a member of the Nebraska Legislature.

== Democratic primary ==
=== Candidates ===
- Hazeldeane Carpenter, wife of Terry Carpenter
- Ross Rasmussen, member of the Nebraska Legislature from District 15

=== Results ===
Democratic primary results
Party	Candidate	Votes	%
Democratic	Ross Rasmussen	73,931	66.25
Democratic	Hazeldeane Carpenter	37,546	33.64
Scattering		125	

== Republican primary ==
=== Candidates ===
- Philip C. Anderson
- Kenneth L. Bowen, Speaker of the Nebraska Legislature and member of the Nebraska Legislature from District 37
- John Everroad
- Edwin L. Hart
- Byron M. Johnson
- Sam Klaver, member of the Nebraska Legislature from District 9
- Fern Hubbard Orme, member of the Nebraska Legislature from District 29

=== Results ===
Republican primary results
Party	Candidate	Votes	%
Republican	John Everroad	49,069	30.56
Republican	Kenneth L. Bowen	27,685	17.24
Republican	Fern Hubbard Orme	23,644	14.73
Republican	Philip C. Anderson	20,219	12.59
Republican	Sam Klaver	18,465	11.50
Republican	Byron M. Johnson	16,115	10.04
Republican	Edwin L. Hart	5,322	3.31
Scattering		36	

== General election ==
=== Results ===
Nebraska lieutenant gubernatorial election, 1966
Party	Candidate	Votes	%
Republican	John Everroad	285,163	61.11%
Democratic	Ross Rasmussen	181,486	38.89%
Scattering		25	
Total votes		466,674	100.00%
Republican gain from Democratic			

== See also ==
- 1966 Nebraska gubernatorial election
