= Julia Chinn =

American enslaved woman married to Vice President Richard Johnson (c. 1790–1833)

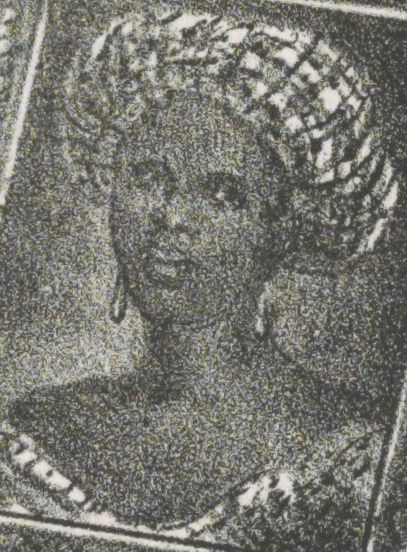
- Excerpt of portrait purportedly caricaturing Chinn, depicting her as African
- Born: c. 1790s Scott County, Kentucky, U.S.
- Died: July 1833 (aged 35–43) near Georgetown, Kentucky, U.S.
- Occupations: Plantation manager; wife
- Spouse: Richard Mentor Johnson
- Children: 2

Julia Chinn (c. 1790 – July 1833) was an American plantation manager and enslaved woman of "mixed race" (an "octoroon" of seven-eighths European and one-eighth African ancestry), who was the common-law wife of the ninth vice president of the United States, Richard Mentor Johnson.

== Early life ==
Chinn was born in Scott County, Kentucky, to a woman enslaved by the Johnson family. Her exact date of birth is unknown, according to historian Amrita Myers, though Johnson family lore places it in the year 1790. However, Myers also records that "ex-slaves of the Johnsons say that Julia was only fifteen or sixteen when her first daughter was born". This would make her birth year 1796 or 1797. It is recognized that she was raised and educated at the home of her enslaver, Richard Mentor Johnson, by his mother, Jemima Suggett Johnson. According to historian Christina Snyder, local oral tradition maintained that Chinn's mother's name was Henrietta, who was held in slavery by the Johnson family.

Little is known about Chinn's life in the household, but by 1811, she and Johnson were in a sexual relationship. Chinn's personal views about the relationship have not survived in the historical record. It was common at the time for enslavers to coerce enslaved women into sexual relationships. In 2021, writing for The Washington Post's history blog, Ronald Shafer opined that, "as an enslaved woman, Chinn could not consent to a relationship". Their first daughter, Adaline Chinn Johnson, was born in 1812, and a few years later, their second daughter, Imogene Chinn Johnson, was born. Under law at the time, interracial marriage was banned and Johnson was under no obligation to acknowledge responsibility for his and Chinn's children. Nevertheless, he insisted that his daughters take his surname. He also insisted that they be educated at the Choctaw Academy that he established. In 1815, Johnson's father died and he legally inherited Chinn, whom he outwardly treated as his wife, something atypical for the period.

== Blue Spring Farm ==
Johnson represented Kentucky in the House of Representatives, which meant many absences from his home and the businesses on his property. While he was away Chinn was in charge, not just of the household, but of the entire plantation. She managed all the business affairs and on Johnson's orders the workers on the property were to obey her, an unusual act since she was an enslaved woman. Letters from Johnson show that he instructed in writing his white employees to obey Chinn.

It is clear that while Johnson was the owner of Blue Springs plantation, it was Chinn who was in charge of its administration. This included overseeing the enslaved laborers, supervising the house and garden, the tavern on their farm, the mills, as well as planning entertainment and hospitality, which was part of her husband's political life. She also was responsible for ensuring the education of their children. She reportedly played the piano very well.

Chinn was responsible for the budgets and credit lines of the estate and essentially worked as Johnson's estate manager, as well as his wife. She was recognized as an authorized user of his accounts, establishing lines of credit to pay for goods in his name. She was responsible for the cash that Johnson withdrew before leaving for Washington for his political career each year. This money was used to pay the white salaried workers in the estate, including teachers at the Choctaw Academy. As an enslaved woman, this cash relationship in particular, connected her to the world of commerce in ways that were unusual for someone of her gender and background at the time. In her role as plantation manager, Chinn was able to improve the lives of her extended family as well: her brother Daniel and his sons worked in the house. Nevertheless, their safety could not be guaranteed and, in 1821, Johnson mortgaged Daniel and his wife, to raise money to pay debts.

Not everyone on the plantation welcomed Chinn's supervision: one historian reports that when she was in charge many of the male enslaved field hands skipped work or refused their tasks and that when she asked male neighbors to punish the rebellious men, none would agree to.

In 1825, Johnson opened a school for Native American boys, on his Blue Springs plantation. Chinn handled the management of the school and payment of its teachers while Johnson was away. She also acted as its nurse. The Native American students paid for their tuition. Apparently, they resented that Chinn would report on any misbehavior by them to Johnson and the schoolteachers.

== Later life ==
In 1833, there was a cholera outbreak at the Choctaw Academy, part of a regional cholera epidemic. Chinn nursed many of the boys and eventually contracted the disease that would be the cause of her death. She died in July 1833. The location of her grave is unknown.

At the time of Chinn's death, their daughters—as the children of an enslaved woman—were technically her husband's slaves. Although he never liberated Chinn, he did free their surviving daughter.

Although Johnson treated these two daughters as his own, according to Myers, the surviving Imogene was prevented from inheriting his estate at the time of his death. The court noted she was illegitimate, and so without rights in the case. Upon Johnson's death, the Fayette County Court found that "he left no widow, children, father, or mother living." It divided his estate between his living brothers, John and Henry.

Bevins's account, written for the Georgetown & Scott County Museum, says that Adeline's son Robert Johnson Scott, her first cousin, Richard M. Johnson Jr., and Imogene's family (husband Daniel Pence, first daughter Malvina and son-in-law Robert Lee, and second daughter and son-in-law Josiah Pence) "acquired" Johnson's remaining land after his death.

== Legacy ==
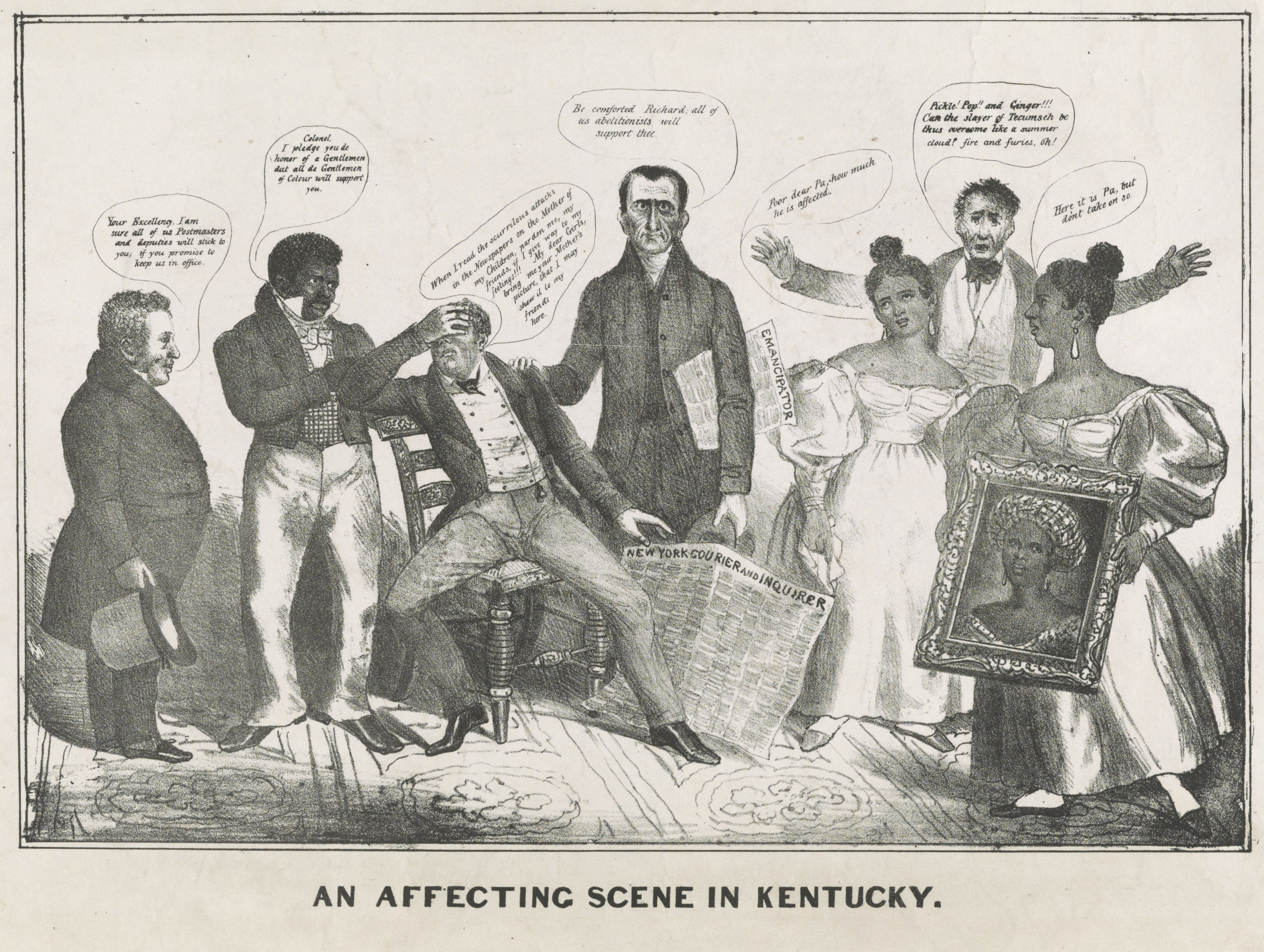
"An affecting scene in Kentucky" – racist cartoon by Henry R. Robinson depicting Johnson, Chinn, and their daughters in which racial characteristics of the women are overemphasized

Throughout her lifetime, Chinn fulfilled the traditional role for the wife of a politician. When the Marquis de Lafayette visited the plantation, Chinn helped organize entertainment in his honor, both at the plantation and throughout the county. This entailed a high degree of organization, both of the property she was responsible for, as well as the management of relations with the white political society in the community.

Johnson's Senate career ended in 1828 when he was not re-elected to his Kentucky seat. He was eliminated from consideration as a candidate for vice president during the Andrew Jackson campaign for president, with whom Johnson had hoped to run. Apparently, his relationship with Chinn contributed to this because fears existed about its potential to be damaging by association to the reputation of the president hopeful. While interracial sex was common, interracial relationships were expected to be hidden—something Johnson did not do.

After Chinn's death, Johnson ran for the vice-presidency alongside the eighth president, Martin Van Buren, and was elected. However, during the campaign numerous cartoons and broadsides were published that disparaged Johnson because of his relationships with Chinn and their two daughters. In one cartoon, dated to 1836, Johnson is featured with both daughters one of whom holds a picture of Chinn and one of the captions reads: "When I read the scurrilous attacks in the Newspapers on the Mother of my Children, pardon me, my friends if I give way to feelings!!! My dear Girls, bring me your Mother's picture, that I may show it to my friends here." In the cartoon, the color of the skin of Chinn and her daughters was darkened deliberately. Chinn reportedly had only one black ancestor, a great-grandparent, and it is likely her skin was much paler than depicted in the cartoon. Likewise, 'otherness' was suggested in the cartoon by depicting her as wearing a turban.

No records remain that were written by Chinn or her two daughters. Historian Amrita Myers believes that Johnson's brothers destroyed much of his archive after his death for two reasons: first, so that they might disinherit his daughters, whom he had named as beneficiaries in his will; second, because they were ashamed of his relationship with Chinn.

In 2020, discussion was raised in Johnson County, Iowa, as to whether the county should be renamed, removing its association with Richard Mentor Johnson. Reasons given for removal included Johnson's killing of numerous Native Americans during battles, including Tecumseh, and his enslavement of many people, including Chinn.

== Literature ==
Chinn and her husband, Richard Mentor Johnson, are the subject of the 2021 novel Great Crossing by Judalon de Bornay.

In October 2023, the University of North Carolina Press published a biography, The Vice President’s Black Wife: The Untold Life of Julia Chinn, by historian Amrita Myers.
