= Senator Johnston =

Senator Johnston may refer to:

== Members of the Australian Senate ==
- Bertie Johnston (1880–1942), Australian Senator from Western Australia from 1929 to 1942
- David Johnston (Australian politician) (born 1956), Australian Senator from Western Australia from 2002 to 2016

== Members of the Canadian Senate ==
- John Frederick Johnston (1876–1948), Canadian Senator from Saskatchewan from 1943 to 1948

== Members of the Northern Irish Senate ==
- James Johnston (Northern Ireland politician) (1849–1924), Northern Irish Senator from 1921 to 1924
- John Stewart Johnston (born 1906), Northern Irish Senator from 1958 to 1965 and from 1967 to 1973
- William Ernest George Johnston (1884–1951), Northern Irish Senator from 1949 to 1951

== Members of the United States Senate ==
- J. Bennett Johnston (1932–2025), U.S. Senator from Louisiana from 1972 to 1997
- John W. Johnston (1818–1889), U.S. Senator from Virginia from 1870 to 1883
- Joseph F. Johnston (1843–1913), U.S. Senator from Alabama from 1907 to 1913
- Josiah S. Johnston (1784–1833), U.S. Senator from Louisiana from 1824 to 1833
- Olin D. Johnston (1896–1965), U.S. Senator from South Carolina from 1945 to 1965
- Rienzi Melville Johnston (1849–1926), U.S. Senator from Texas in 1913; also served in the Texas State Senate
- Samuel Johnston (1733–1816), U.S. Senator from North Carolina from 1789 to 1793

== United States state senate members ==
- Alva Johnston (politician) (1872–1953), Nebraska State Senate
- David Emmons Johnston (1845–1917), West Virginia State Senate
- George Doherty Johnston (1832–1910), Alabama State Senate
- Harry Johnston (American politician) (1931–2021), Florida State Senate
- Henry S. Johnston (1867–1965), Oklahoma State Senate
- J. Mark Johnston (born 1962), South Dakota State Senate
- James Johnston (colonel) (1740s–1805), North Carolina State Senate
- Joseph F. Johnston (1843–1913), Alabama State Senate
- Mike Johnston (Colorado politician) (born 1974), Colorado State Senate
- Mike Johnston (Kansas politician) (born 1945), Kansas State Senate
- Patrick Johnston (American politician) (born 1946), California State Senate
- Rod Johnston (1937–2018), Wisconsin State Senate
- Thomas D. Johnston (1840–1902), North Carolina State Senate
- W. Broughton Johnston (1905–1978), West Virginia State Senate
- William Agnew Johnston (1848–1937), Kansas State Senate
- William Johnston (California politician) (1829–1905), California State Senate

== See also ==
- Archibald Johnstone (1924–2014), Canadian Senator from Prince Edward Island from 1998 to 1999
- Senator Johnson (disambiguation)
