= E. Thome Johnson =

American politician (1905–1984)

Member of the Nebraska Legislature from the 15th district
- In office November 25, 1968 – January 5, 1977
- Preceded by: Ross Rasmussen
- Succeeded by: Barry Reutzel

Personal details
- Born: January 4, 1905 Broken Bow, Nebraska
- Died: August 13, 1984 (aged 79) Fremont, Nebraska
- Party: Republican
- Spouse: Jean Claney (m. 1930)
- Children: 2 (William, Howard)
- Education: University of Nebraska
- Occupation: Farmer, businessman

E. Thome Johnson (January 4, 1905 – August 13, 1984) was a Republican politician from Nebraska who served as a member of the Nebraska Legislature from the 15th district from 1968 to 1977.

== Early life ==
Johnson was born in Broken Bow, Nebraska, in 1905, and graduated from Broken Bow High School in 1923. He attended the University of Nebraska, graduating in 1927. Johnson moved to Fremont in 1941 and operated a farm outside of the city.

In 1956, when State Senator Earl Lee declined to seek re-election, Johnson ran to succeed him in the 11th district, which included Dodge and Washington counties. In the nonpartisan primary, he faced attorney Ray Simmons. Simmons narrowly placed first in the primary, winning 23 votes more that Johnson, and they advanced to the general election. Simmons narrowly defeated Johnson, winning 51 percent of the vote to Johnson's 49 percent.

Johnson ran for the Dodge County Board of Supervisors in 1966 from the 7th district. He won the Republican nomination unopposed, and was uncontested in the general election.

== Nebraska Legislature ==
In 1968, Johnson ran for the state legislature from the 15th district, which included only Dodge County, challenging incumbent State Senator Ross Rasmussen for re-election. He was joined in the nonpartisan primary by former Fremont Mayor Win Menninger. In the primary election, Renninger placed first, receiving 35 percent of the vote. On election night, Johnson was fewer than 50 votes ahead of Rasmussen, and after all votes were counted, the official results confirmed that Johnson had defeated Rasmussen by 42 votes. In the general election, Johnson defeated Renninger, receiving 53 percent of the vote to his 47 percent.

Following Johnson's victory in the general election, Rasmussen announced that he would resign his seat early prior to the convening of a special legislative session, and urged Governor Norbert Tiemann to appoint Johnson as his successor. Tiemann appointed Johnson to serve out the final weeks of Rasmussen's term, and he was sworn in on November 25, 1968.

In 1972, Johnson ran for re-election to a second term, and was challenged by machine operator Alfred Greeley and Patrick Chaulk, a student at the University of Nebraska–Lincoln. Johnson placed first in the primary by a wide margin, receiving 58 percent of the vote to Greeley's 26 percent and Chaulk's 16 percent. He and Greeley advanced to the general election, where Johnson won re-election in a landslide, defeating Greeley with 60 percent of the vote.

Johnson declined to seek a third term in 1976.

== Death ==
Johnson died on August 13, 1984.
