= Ray Simmons =

American politician (1925–2002)

Member of the Nebraska Legislature from the 11th district
- In office January 1, 1957 – January 3, 1961
- Preceded by: Earl Jackson Lee
- Succeeded by: Ross Rasmussen

Personal details
- Born: August 17, 1925 Washington, D.C.
- Died: July 31, 2002 (aged 76) Fremont, Nebraska
- Party: Republican
- Spouse: Marianne Kelley (m. 1957)
- Children: 2 (Mike, Betsy)
- Parent: Robert G. Simmons (father)
- Education: Peru State Teachers College; Doane College; University of Nebraska; University of Nebraska College of Law
- Occupation: Attorney

Military service
- Allegiance: United States
- Branch/service: United States Navy

Ray Clifford Simmons (August 17, 1925 – July 31, 2002) was a Republican politician from Nebraska who served as a member of the Nebraska Legislature from the 11th district from 1957 to 1961.

== Early life ==
Simmons was born in Washington, D.C., in 1925, the son of Congressman Robert G. Simmons, who later served as Chief Justice of the Nebraska Supreme Court. He attended Peru State Teachers College and Doane College. He was commissioned in the U.S. Navy and served during World War II. Simmons graduated from the University of Nebraska with his bachelor's degree in 1947, and then from the University of Nebraska College of Law in 1950. He subsequently clerked for Justice Harold H. Burton on the United States Supreme Court. Simmons subsequently served as an attorney in the Navy, and was an assistant prosecutor in the investigation of the collision between the USS Hobson and the USS Wasp.

In 1953, Simmons settled in Fremont, and began working for the law firm of Spear and Lamme. Simmons was active in the Nebraska Republican Party, and served as the chairman of the Nebraska Young Republicans. He was proposed as a possible candidate for U.S. Attorney in 1956, but Robert Spire was ultimately recommended by U.S. Senators Carl Curtis and Roman Hruska.

== Nebraska Legislature ==
In 1956, State Senator Earl Lee declined to seek re-election. Simmons ran to succeed him in the 11th district, which included Dodge and Washington counties. In the nonpartisan primary, Simmons faced farmer E. Thome Johnson, and narrowly placed first, receiving 23 more votes than Johnson. They advanced to the general election, which Simmons narrowly won, defeating Johnson, 51–49 percent.

Simmons ran for re-election in 1958, and was re-elected unopposed. He declined to seek a third term in 1960.

== Death ==
Simmons died on July 31, 2002.
