= Lowell Johnson =

American politician (1920–2009)

Member of the Nebraska Public Service Commission from the 3rd district
- In office January 5, 1995 – January 4, 2007
- Preceded by: Duane Gay
- Succeeded by: Tim Schram

Member of the Nebraska Legislature from the 15th district
- In office January 7, 1981 – January 6, 1993
- Preceded by: Barry Reutzel
- Succeeded by: Ray Janssen

Personal details
- Born: June 12, 1920 Dodge County, Nebraska
- Died: September 1, 2009 (aged 89) Fremont, Nebraska
- Party: Republican
- Spouse: Ruth Marion Sloss (m. 1943; died 1992)
- Children: 4 (Mark, Kent, James, Nancy)
- Education: University of Nebraska (B.S.)
- Occupation: Engineer

Lowell C. Johnson (June 12, 1920 – September 1, 2009) was a Republican politician from Nebraska who served as a member of the Nebraska Public Service Commission from the 3rd district from 1995 to 2007. Johnson previously served in the Nebraska Legislature from the 15th district from 1981 to 1993.

== Early career ==
Johnson was born in Dodge County and graduated from North Bend High School in North Bend in 1937. He attended the University of Nebraska and graduated with his bachelor's degree in mechanical engineering in 1942. Johnson served in the United States Navy during World War II. He worked as an engineer for the Phillips Petroleum Company and as a plant manager for Watson Industries, and as a field representative for Republican Congressman Charles Thone prior to his election as Governor.

== Nebraska Legislature ==
In 1980, Johnson ran for the Nebraska Legislature in the 15th district, which was based in Dodge County, against incumbent senator Barry Reutzel. Reutzel placed first in the primary over Johnson, winning 55–45 percent. In a "major upset," Johnson defeated Reutzel by a wide margin in the general election, receiving 57 percent of the vote to Reutzel's 43 percent. Though the race was formally nonpartisan, Reutzel was a Democrat and Johnson was a Republican, and the Nebraska Republican Party invested resources in the district to support Johnson.

Johnson ran for re-election in 1984, and was unopposed in the primary election. However, after the primary election, Judy Larsen, a farmer and substitute teacher, successfully petitioned to appear on the ballot and challenged Johnson. Johnson ultimately defeated Larsen, winning 53 percent of the vote to her 47 percent.

He was elected to a third term unopposed in 1988, and declined to seek a fourth term in 1992.

== Nebraska Public Service Commission ==
In 1994, Johnson announced that he would run for the Nebraska Public Service Commission from the 3rd district, which included most of northeastern Nebraska following redistricting. Incumbent commissioner Duane Gay was drawn into a neighboring district and declined to seek another term. He faced former State Senator Gerald Conway and truck driver Ted Bailey in the Republican primary, and won by a wide margin, receiving 49 percent of the vote to Conway's 31 percent and Bailey's 20 percent. Johnson faced Democratic nominee Willie Buchholz, a warehouse examiner who worked for the commission, in the general election. He defeated Buchholz in a landslide, receiving 66 percent of the vote.

Johnson ran for re-election in 2000, and was challenged in the Republican primary by Dixon County Sheriff Dean Chase. He ultimately defeated Chase to win the primary, receiving 59 percent of the vote to Chase's 41 percent. In the general election, he was challenged by Democratic nominee Rich Hurley, and won his second term in a landslide with 65 percent of the vote.

In 2006, Johnson announced that he would not seek re-election to a third term.

== Death ==
Johnson died on September 1, 2009, in Fremont, Nebraska.
