= Ray Janssen =

American politician from Nebraska (1937–2022)

Member of the Nebraska Legislature from the 15th district
- In office January 6, 1993 – January 7, 2009
- Preceded by: Lowell Johnson
- Succeeded by: Charlie Janssen

Personal details
- Born: July 5, 1937 Hooper, Nebraska
- Died: December 17, 2022 (aged 85) Fremont, Nebraska
- Party: Democratic
- Spouse: Nancy
- Children: 3
- Occupation: Businessman, farmer

Military service
- Allegiance: United States
- Branch/service: United States Army

Ramon E. "Ray" Janssen (July 5, 1937 – December 17, 2022) was a Democratic politician from Nebraska who served as a member of the Nebraska Legislature from the 15th district from 1993 to 2009.

== Early life ==
Janssen was born in Hooper, Nebraska, in 1937, and graduated from Hooper High School. He served in the U.S. Army and owned the City Meat Market in Hooper. Janssen served as a member of the Nickerson Public School Board and the Logan View Junior-Senior High School Board.

== Nebraska Legislature ==
In 1992, when State Senator Lowell Johnson declined to seek re-election, Janssen was elected to succeed him in the 15th district. He was re-elected in 1996, 2000, and 2004. He served on the Revenue, Urban Affairs, and Building Maintenance committees and chaired the Revenue Committee. Janssen was term-limited in 2008, and was succeeded by his nephew, Charlie Janssen.

== Death ==
Janssen died on December 17, 2022.
