= Richard Mentor Johnson =

Vice President of the United States from 1837 to 1841

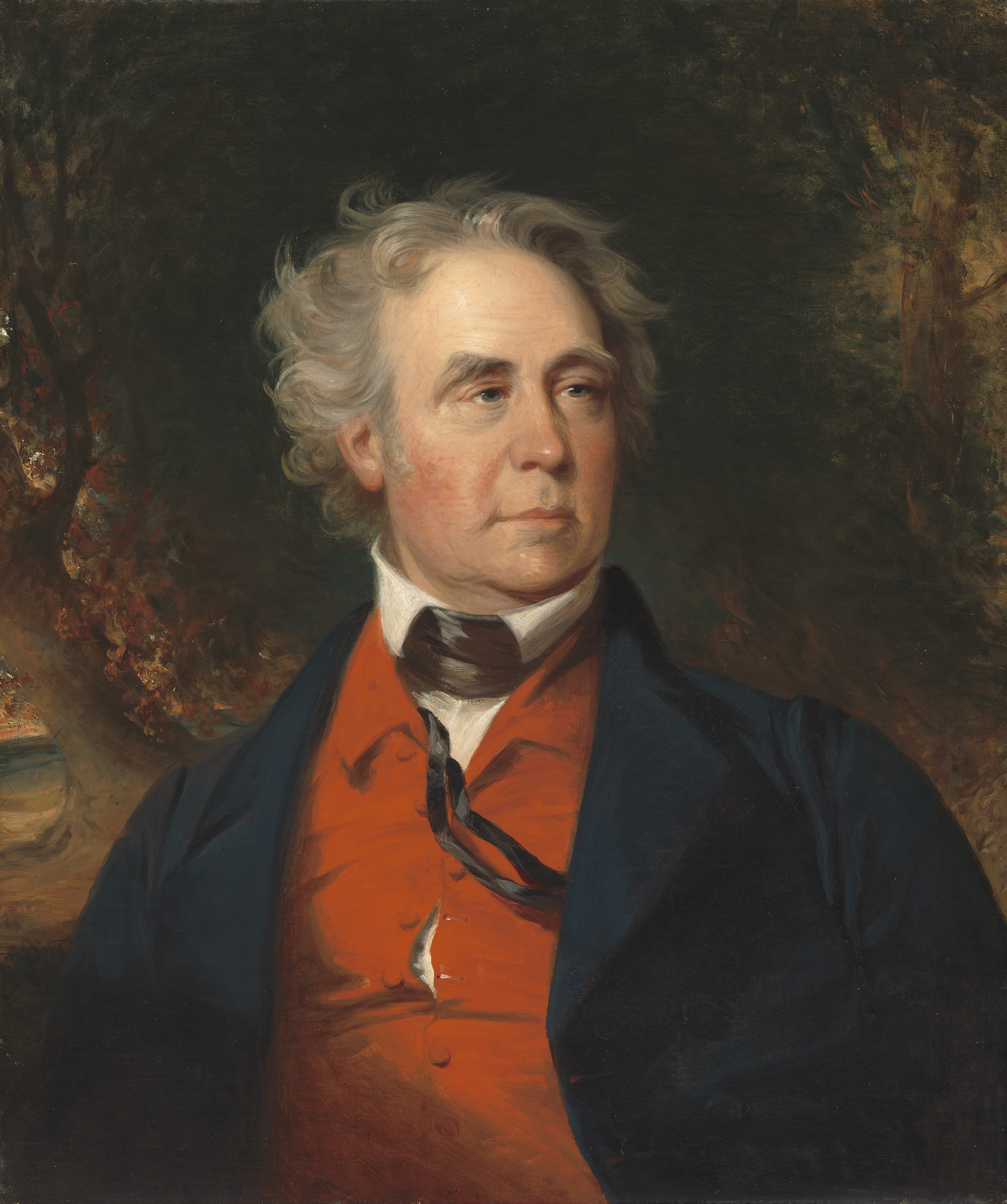
- Portrait c. 1843

9th Vice President of the United States
- In office March 4, 1837 – March 4, 1841
- President: Martin Van Buren
- Preceded by: Martin Van Buren
- Succeeded by: John Tyler

United States Senator from Kentucky
- In office December 10, 1819 – March 3, 1829
- Preceded by: John J. Crittenden
- Succeeded by: George M. Bibb

Member of the U.S. House of Representatives from Kentucky
- In office March 4, 1829 – March 3, 1837
- Preceded by: Robert L. McHatton
- Succeeded by: William W. Southgate
- Constituency: 5th district (1829–1833); 13th district (1833–1837)
- In office March 4, 1807 – March 3, 1819
- Preceded by: Thomas Sandford
- Succeeded by: William Brown
- Constituency: 4th district (1807–1813); 3rd district (1813–1819)

Member of the Kentucky House of Representatives
- In office November 5, 1850 – November 19, 1850
- In office December 30, 1841 – December 29, 1843
- In office August 1819 – c. November 1819
- In office November 6, 1804 – November 4, 1806

Personal details
- Born: October 17, 1780 Beargrass, Virginia (present-day Louisville, Kentucky), U.S.
- Died: November 19, 1850 (aged 70) Frankfort, Kentucky, U.S.
- Resting place: Frankfort Cemetery; 38°11′52.2″N 84°52′01.8″W
- Party: Democratic-Republican (before 1828); Democratic (after 1828)
- Spouse: Julia Chinn (common law marriage)
- Children: 2
- Relatives: Conway-Johnson family
- Education: Transylvania University

Military service
- Allegiance: United States
- Branch/service: United States Volunteers
- Years of service: 1812–1814
- Rank: Colonel
- Battles/wars: War of 1812; Battle of the Thames (WIA)

Richard Mentor Johnson (October 17, 1780 (Note: Emmons and Langworthy give 1781, and Pratt and Sobel accept this date; this has the effect of making him born in Kentucky, which would be a reason to invent it.) – November 19, 1850) was an American lawyer, military officer, and politician who served as the ninth vice president of the United States from 1837 to 1841 under President Martin Van Buren. He is the only vice president elected by the United States Senate under the provisions of the Twelfth Amendment. Johnson also represented Kentucky in the U.S. House of Representatives and Senate. He began and ended his political career in the Kentucky House of Representatives.

After two years in the Kentucky House, Johnson was elected to the U.S. House in 1806. He allied with fellow Kentuckian Henry Clay as a member of the War Hawks faction that favored war with Britain in 1812. At the outset of the War of 1812, Johnson was commissioned a colonel in the Kentucky Militia and commanded a regiment of mounted volunteers from 1812 to 1813. He and his brother James served under William Henry Harrison in Upper Canada. Johnson led troops in the Battle of the Thames. Many reported that he personally killed the Shawnee chief Tecumseh, a claim that he later used to his political advantage.

After the war, Johnson returned to the House of Representatives. The state legislature appointed him to the Senate in 1819 to fill the seat vacated by John J. Crittenden. With his increasing prominence, Johnson was criticized for his interracial relationship with Julia Chinn, a slave who was classified as octoroon (or seven-eighths white). Unlike other upper-class planters and leaders who had African-American mistresses or concubines, but never acknowledged them, Johnson treated Chinn as his common law wife. He acknowledged their two daughters as his children, giving them his surname, much to the consternation of some of his constituents. It is believed that because of this, the state legislature picked another candidate for the Senate in 1828, forcing Johnson to leave in 1829, but his Congressional district voted for him and returned him to the House the same year.

In the 1836 election, Johnson was the Democratic nominee for vice-president on a ticket with Martin Van Buren. Campaigning with the slogan "Rumpsey Dumpsey, Rumpsey Dumpsey, Colonel Johnson killed Tecumseh", Johnson fell one short of the electoral votes needed to secure his election. Virginia's delegation to the Electoral College refused to endorse Johnson, voting instead for William Smith of South Carolina. The Senate elected him to the vice-presidential office. Due to his relationships with several Black or mixed-race women, including his common-law wife Julia Chinn, Johnson proved such a burden for the Democrats in the 1836 election that they refused to renominate him for vice president in 1840. Van Buren campaigned for reelection without a running mate. He lost to William Henry Harrison, a Whig. Johnson then served two more years in the Kentucky House of Representatives. He tried to return to higher office but was defeated. He finally was elected to the Kentucky House in 1850, but died on November 19, 1850, just two weeks into his term.

== Early life and education ==
Richard Mentor Johnson was born in the settlement of Beargrass on the Kentucky frontier (present-day Louisville) on October 17, 1780, the fifth of Robert and Jemima (Suggett) Johnson's 11 children, and the second of eight sons. His brothers John and Henry Johnson survived him. His parents married in 1770. Robert Johnson purchased land in what is now Kentucky, but was then part of Virginia, from Patrick Henry and from James Madison. He had worked as a surveyor and was able to pick out good land. His wife Jemima Suggett "came from a wealthy and politically connected family."

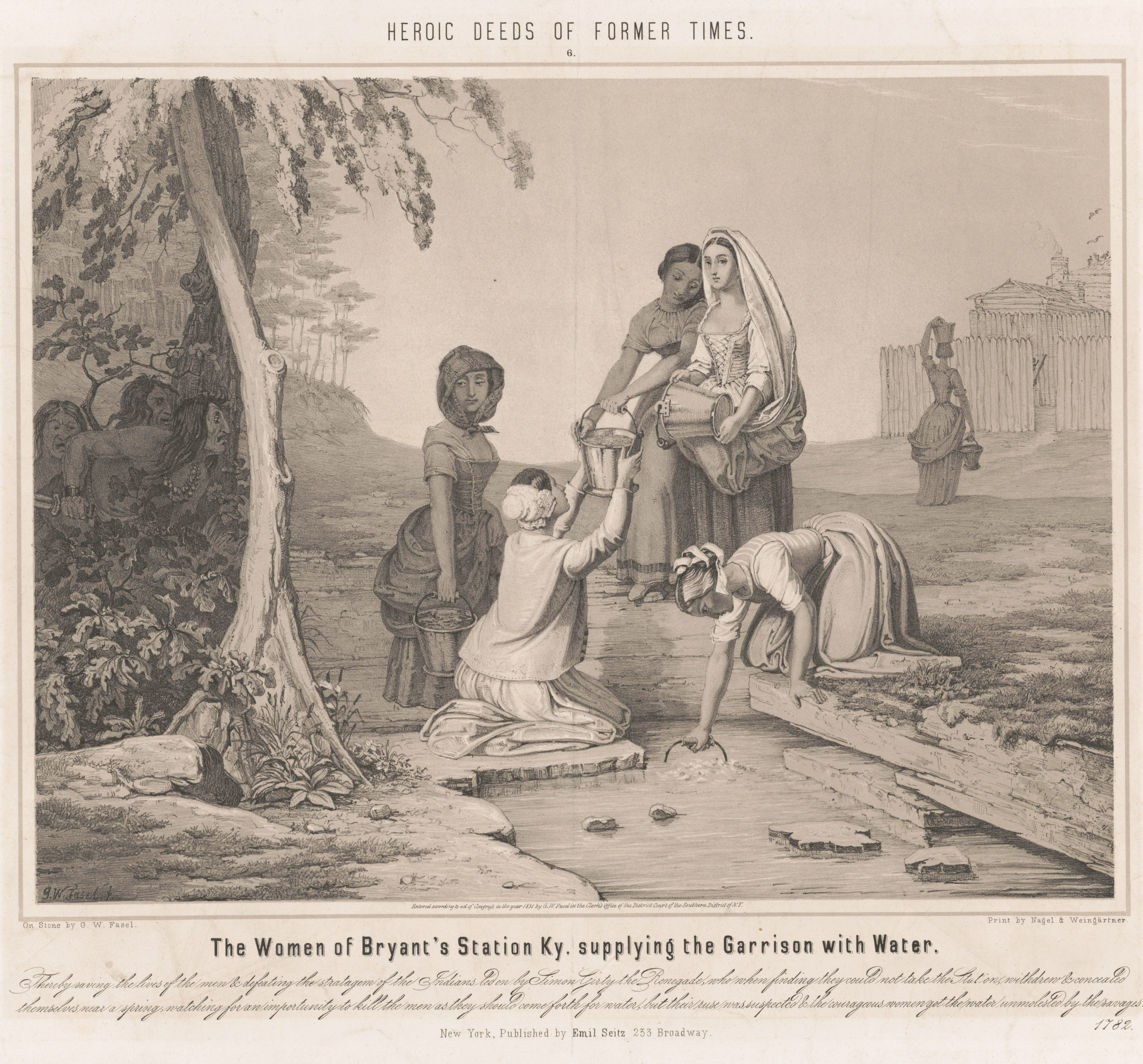
The women of Bryan's Station draw water while the enemy looks on

About the time of Richard's birth, the family moved to Bryan's Station, near present-day Lexington in the Bluegrass Region. This was a fortified outpost, as there was much Native American resistance to white settlement. The Shawnee and Cherokee hunted in this area. Jemima Johnson was remembered as among the community's heroic women because of what was told of her actions during Simon Girty's raid on Bryan's Station in August 1782. According to later reports, with Indian warriors hidden in the nearby woods and the community short on water, she led the women to a nearby spring, and the attackers allowed them to return to the fort with the water. Having the water helped the settlers beat off an attack made with flaming arrows. At the time, Robert Johnson was serving in the legislature in Richmond, Virginia, as he had been elected to represent Fayette County. (Kentucky was part of Virginia until 1792.)

Beginning in 1783, Kentucky was considered safe enough that settlers began to leave the fortified stations to establish farms. The Johnsons settled on the land Robert had purchased at Great Crossing. As a surveyor, he became successful through well-chosen land purchases and being in the region when he could take advantage of huge land grants.

According to Miles Smith's doctoral thesis, "Richard developed a cheery disposition and seems to have been a generally happy and content child". Richard lived on the family plantation until he was 16. In 1796, he was sent briefly to a local grammar school, and then attended Transylvania University, the first college west of the Appalachian Mountains. While at the Lexington college, where his father was a trustee, he read law as a legal apprentice with George Nicholas and James Brown, later a US Senator.

== Career ==
Johnson was admitted to the Kentucky bar in 1802, and opened his law office at Great Crossing. Later, he owned a retail store as a merchant and pursued a number of business ventures with his brothers. Johnson often worked pro bono for poor people, prosecuting their cases when they had merit. He also opened his home to disabled veterans, widows, and orphans. Johnson also became a prominent Freemason, and in the late 1830s was part of a Masonic organization, the Hunters Lodge, that unsuccessfully planned an invasion of Canada to overthrow the British government there and establish a provisional American administration.

== Marriage and family ==
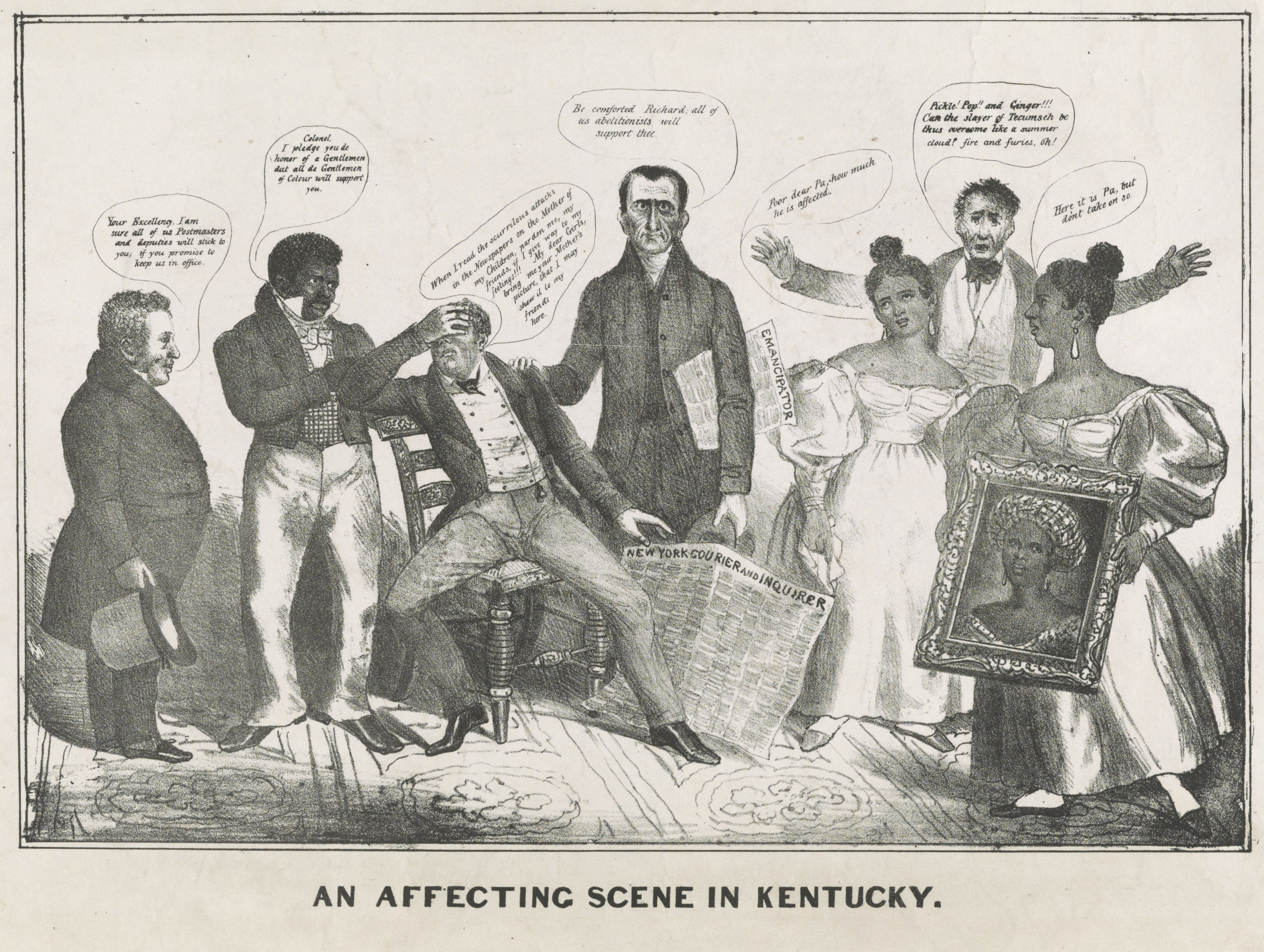
"An affecting scene in Kentucky," a racist cartoon by Henry R. Robinson mocking Johnson's mixed-race family and political allies, 1836

Family tradition holds that Johnson broke off an early marital engagement when he was about sixteen because of his mother's disapproval. Purportedly Johnson vowed revenge for his mother's interference. His former fiancée later gave birth to his daughter, named Celia, who was raised by the Johnson family. Celia Johnson later married Wesley Fancher, one of the men who served in Johnson's regiment at the Battle of the Thames.

After his father died, Richard Johnson inherited Julia Chinn, an octoroon mixed-race woman (seven-eighths European and one-eighth African in ancestry), who was born into slavery around 1790. She had grown up in the Johnson household, where her mother served. Julia Chinn was the daughter of Benjamin Chinn, who was living in Malden, Upper Canada, or London, Canada, and a sister of Daniel Chinn. An 1845 letter from Newton Craig, Keeper of the Penitentiary in Frankfort, Kentucky, to Daniel Chinn, mentions another brother of Julia Chinn named Marcellus, who accompanied Col. Johnson on his first electioneering tour for vice-presidency. Marcellus left Col. Johnson in New York, whereupon Col. Johnson tried to find Marcellus' whereabouts from Arthur Tappan, Esq.

Though Chinn was legally Johnson's concubine, he began a long-term relationship with her and treated her as his common-law wife, which was legal in Kentucky at the time. They had two daughters together and she later became manager of his plantation. Both Johnson and Chinn championed the "notion of a diverse society" by their multi-racial, predominately white family. They were prohibited from marrying because she was a slave. When Johnson was away from his Kentucky plantation, he authorized Chinn to manage his business affairs. She died in the widespread cholera epidemic that occurred in the summer of 1833. Johnson deeply grieved her loss.

The relationship between Johnson and Chinn shows the contradictions within slavery at the time. There were certainly numerous examples that "kin could also be property". Johnson was unusual for being open about his relationship and treating Chinn as his common-law wife. He was heard to call her "my bride" on at least one occasion, and they acted like a married couple. According to oral tradition, other slaves at Great Crossings were said to work on their wedding.

Chinn gradually gained more responsibilities. As she spent much of her time in the "plantation's big house", a two-story brick home, she managed Johnson's estate for at least half of each year, with her purview later expanding to all of his property, even acting as "Richard's representative" and allowing her to handle money. This gave, as historical scholar Christina Snyder argues, some independence, since Johnson told his white employees that Chinn's authority must be respected, and her role allowing her children's lives to be different from "others of African descent at Great Crossings", giving them levels of privileged access within the plantation. This was further complicated by the fact that Chinn was still enslaved but supervised the work of slaves, which the Chinn family never sold or mortgaged off, but she did not have the power to "challenge the institution of slavery or overturn the government that supported it", she only had the power to gain some personal autonomy, with Johnson never legally emancipating her. This may have been because, as Snyder says, liberating her from human bondage would erode "ties that bound her to him" and keeping her enslaved supported his idea of being a "benevolent patriarch".

Johnson and Chinn had two daughters, Adaline (or Adeline) Chinn Johnson and Imogene Chinn Johnson, whom he acknowledged and gave his surname to, with Johnson and Chinn preparing them "for a future as free women". Johnson taught them morality and basic literacy, with Julia undoubtedly teaching her own skills, with both later pushing for both of them to "receive regular academic lessons" which he later educated at home to prevent the scorn of neighbors and constituents. Later Johnson would provide for Adaline and Imogene's education. Both daughters married white men. Johnson gave them large farms as dowries from his own holdings. There is confusion about whether Adeline Chinn Scott had children; a 2007 account by the Scott County History Museum said she had at least one son, Robert Johnson Scott (with husband Thomas W. Scott) who became a doctor in Missouri. Meyers said that she was childless. There is also disagreement about the year of her death. Bevins writes that Adeline died in the 1833 cholera epidemic. Meyers wrote she died in 1836. The Library of Congress notes that she died in February 1836.

Although Johnson treated these two daughters as his own, according to Meyers, the surviving Imogene was prevented from inheriting his estate at the time of his death. The court noted she was illegitimate, and so without rights in the case. Upon Johnson's death, the Fayette County Court found that "he left no widow, children, father, or mother living." It divided his estate between his living brothers, John and Henry.

Bevins's account, written for the Georgetown & Scott County Museum, says that Adeline's son Robert Johnson Scott, her first cousin, Richard M. Johnson, Jr., and Imogene's family (husband Daniel Pence, first daughter Malvina and son-in-law Robert Lee, and second daughter and son-in-law Josiah Pence) "acquired" Johnson's remaining land after his death.

After Chinn's death, Johnson began an intimate relationship with another family slave. When she left him for another man, Johnson had her picked up and sold at auction. Afterward he began a similar relationship with her sister, also a slave.

== Political career ==
=== Early years ===
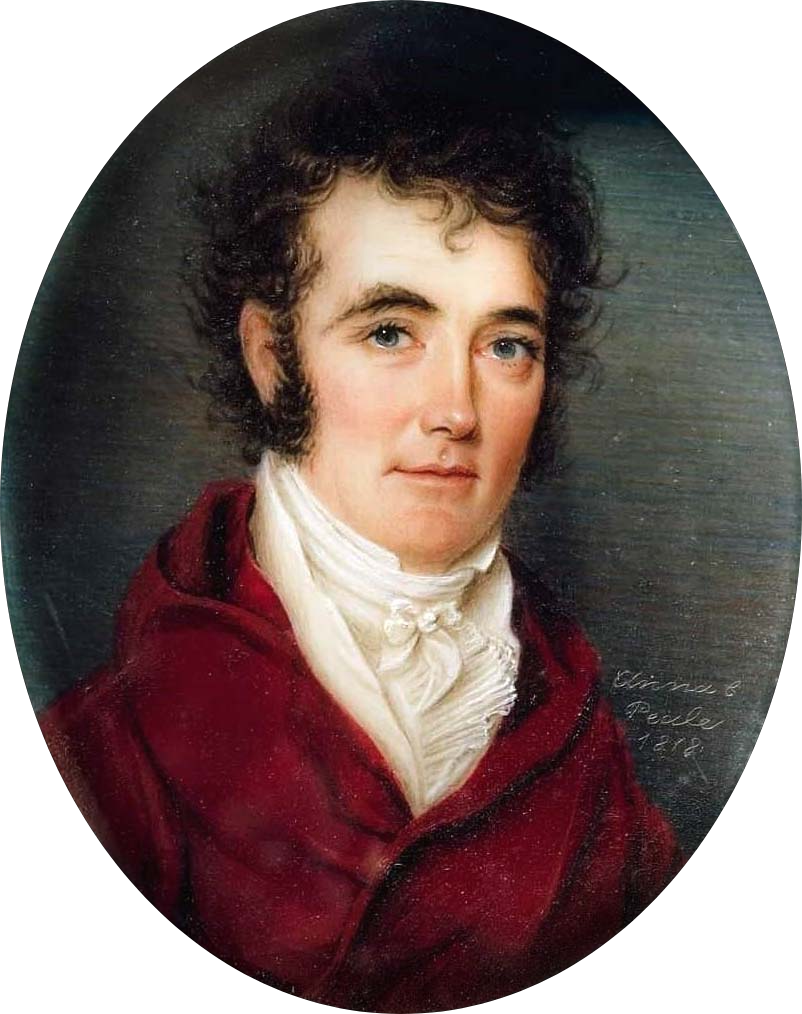
Portrait by Anna C. Peale, 1818

After passing the bar, Johnson returned to Great Crossing, where his father gave him a plantation and slaves to work it. The many lawsuits over ownership of land provided him with much legal work, and, combined with his agricultural interests, he quickly became prosperous.

Johnson ran for a seat in the U.S. House of Representatives in 1803, but finished third, behind the winner, Thomas Sandford, and William Henry. At that time, following the inauguration of Thomas Jefferson in 1801, many young, democratically minded aspiring politicians were seeking office. While Jefferson and Johnson agreed on the need for greater democracy, Jefferson felt that the people should be led by the elite, such as himself, while Johnson took a more populist view.

In 1804, Johnson ran for the Kentucky House of Representatives for Scott County (where Great Crossing is) and this time was elected, the first native Kentuckian to serve in the state's legislature. Although the Kentucky Constitution imposed an age requirement of twenty-four for members of the House of Representatives, Johnson was so popular that no one raised questions about his age, and he was allowed to take his seat. Seeking to protect his constituents, most of whom were small farmers, he introduced a proposed U.S. constitutional amendment limiting the power of the federal courts to matters involving the U.S. Constitution. Throughout his political career, Johnson sought to limit the jurisdiction of federal courts, which he deemed undemocratic.

In 1806, Johnson was elected as a Democratic-Republican to the United States House of Representatives, serving as the first native Kentuckian to be elected to Congress. In the three-way election, he defeated Congressman Sandford and James Moore. At the time of his election in August 1806, he did not meet the U.S. Constitution's age requirement for service in the House (25), but by the time the congressional term began the following March, he had turned 25. He was re-elected and served six consecutive terms. During the first three terms from 1807 to 1813, he represented Kentucky's Fourth District.

Johnson took his seat in the House on October 26, 1807; Congress had been called into special session by President Jefferson to consider how to react to the Chesapeake–Leopard affair, the forcible boarding of an American naval ship by a British vessel, with four sailors seized as deserters and one hanged. Jefferson had tried to maintain neutrality with the main combatants in the Napoleonic Wars, Britain and France, and at his urging, Congress passed the Embargo Act of 1807, with Johnson voting in support, finding economic warfare preferable to the use of guns: "we fear no nation, but let the time for shedding human blood be protracted, when consistent with our safety".

Over the following year, Congress attempted to tighten the embargo, which was widely evaded, especially in the Northeast, with Johnson voting in favor each time. Johnson generally supported Jefferson's proposals, and those of his successor James Madison: all three were Democratic-Republicans, and Johnson saw the party's proposals as superior to any suggested by the Federalists, whom he saw as not acting in the best interests of the country. In 1809, Johnson supported Jefferson in adopting the administration's proposal to replace the Embargo Act with the Non-Intercourse Act, as the embargo had proven ineffective except in causing a serious recession in the United States.

Although Johnson is considered one of the War Hawks, the young Southern and Western Democratic-Republicans who sought expansion and development of the nation, he was cautious in the runup to the War of 1812. Johnson saw Britain as the major obstacle to United States control of North America, but worried about what a war might bring. By the time Congress met in late 1811, he had come around to war, and joined the War Hawks in electing one of their own, Henry Clay of Kentucky, as Speaker. Like the other War Hawks, though, he was initially unwilling to support increased taxes and borrowing to finance the construction of naval vessels. When Madison asked Congress for a declaration of war against Britain in June 1812, Johnson voted in favor as the House passed the resolution, 79–49. Madison signed the declaration on June 18, 1812.

For his fourth consecutive term from 1813 to 1815, he had secured one of Kentucky's at-large seats in the House. For his fifth and sixth consecutive terms, 1815 to 1819, he represented Kentucky's Third District. Johnson continued to represent the interests of the poor as a member of the House. He first came to national attention with his opposition to rechartering the First Bank of the United States.

Johnson served as chairman of the Committee on Claims during the Eleventh Congress (1809–1811). The committee was charged with adjudicating financial claims made by veterans of the Revolutionary War. He sought to influence the committee to grant the claim of Alexander Hamilton's widow to wages which Hamilton had declined when serving under George Washington. Although Hamilton was a champion of the rival Federalist Party, Johnson had compassion for Hamilton's widow; before the end of his term, he secured payment of the wages.

=== War of 1812 ===
==== Initial service ====
Within a week of the declaration of war, Johnson urged the House of Representatives to recommend the raising of troops in the western states, lest disaster befall settlers on the frontier. After the adjournment, Johnson returned to Kentucky to recruit volunteers. So many men responded that he chose only those with horses, and raised a body of mounted rifles. The War of 1812 was extraordinarily popular in Kentucky; Kentuckians depended on sea trade through the port of New Orleans and feared that the British would stir up another Indian war. (Note: Carr also sees, as background motives, the British hostility to slavery, and a consequent wish to disentangle Britain from the United States.) The land war fought in the Northern United States pitted American troops against British forces and their Indian allies. Johnson recruited 300 men, divided into three companies, who elected him major. They merged with another battalion, forming a regiment of 500 men, with Johnson as colonel, with the merged volunteer forces becoming a brigade commanded by General Edward W. Tupper of Ohio. The Kentucky militia was under the command of General William Henry Harrison, the Governor of the Indiana Territory.

Johnson's force was originally intended to join General William Hull at Detroit, but Hull surrendered Detroit on August 16 and his army was captured. Harrison by then was in command of the entire Northwest frontier and ordered Johnson to relieve Fort Wayne in the northeast of the Territory, which was already being attacked by the Indians. On September 18, 1812, Johnson's men reached Fort Wayne in time to save it, and turned back an Indian ambush. They returned to Kentucky and disbanded, going out of their way to burn Potawatomi villages along the Elkhart River en route.

Johnson returned to his seat in Congress in the late fall of 1812. Based on his experience, he proposed a plan to defeat the mobile, guerrilla warfare of the Indians. American troops moved slowly, dependent on a supply line. Indians would evade battle and raid supplies until the American forces withdrew or were overrun. Mounted riflemen could move quickly, carry their own supplies, and live off the woods. If they attacked Indian villages in winter, the Indians would be compelled to stand and fight for the supplies they used to wage war and could be decisively defeated. Johnson submitted this plan to President James Madison and Secretary of War John Armstrong, who approved it in principle. They referred the plan to Harrison, who found winter operations impracticable. Johnson was permitted to try the tactics in the summer of 1813; later, the US conducted Indian wars in winter with his strategy.

Johnson left Washington, D.C., just before Congress adjourned. He raised one thousand men, nominally part of the Kentucky militia under Governor Isaac Shelby, but largely operating independently. He disciplined his men, required that every man have arms in prime condition and ready to hand, and hired gunsmiths, blacksmiths, and doctors at his own expense. He devised a new tactical system: when any group of men encountered the enemy, they were to dismount, take cover, and hold the enemy in place. All groups not in contact were to ride to the sound of firing, and dismount, surrounding the enemy when they got there. Between May and September, Johnson raided throughout the Northwest, burning the war supply centers of Indian villages, surrounding their fighting units and scattering them, killing some warriors each time.

==== Battle of the Thames ====
In September, Oliver Hazard Perry captured a British squadron at the Battle of Lake Erie, taking control of the lake. This made the British army, then at Fort Malden (now Amherstburg, Ontario) vulnerable to having its supply lines cut. The British, under General Henry Procter, withdrew to the northeast, pursued by Harrison, who had advanced through Michigan while Johnson kept the Indians engaged. The Indian chief Tecumseh and his allies covered the British retreat, but were countered by Johnson, who had been called back from a raid on Kaskaskia that had taken the post where the British had distributed arms and money to the Indians. Johnson's cavalry defeated Tecumseh's main force on September 29, took British supply trains on October 3, and was one of the factors inducing Procter to stand and fight at the Battle of the Thames on October 5, as Tecumseh had been demanding he do. One of Johnson's slaves, Daniel Chinn, accompanied Johnson to the battle.

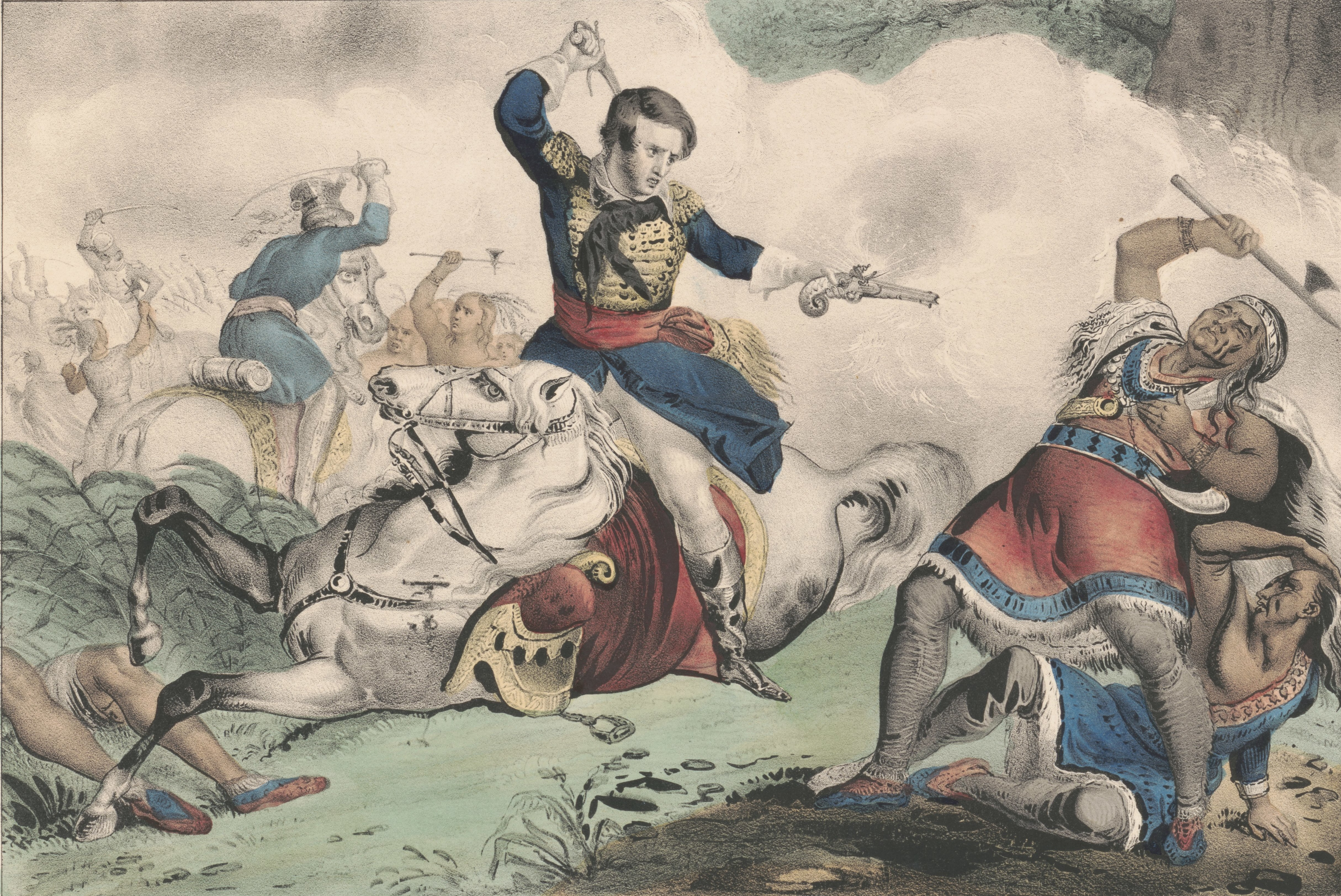
Nathaniel Currier's lithograph (c. 1846) is one of many images that portrayed Johnson as Tecumseh's killer.

At the battle itself, Johnson's forces were the first to attack. One battalion of five hundred men, under Johnson's elder brother, James Johnson, engaged the British force of eight hundred regulars; simultaneously, Richard Johnson, with the other, now somewhat smaller battalion, attacked the fifteen hundred Indians led by Tecumseh. There was too much tree cover for the British volleys to be effective against James Johnson; three-quarters of the regulars were killed or captured.

The Indians were a harder fight; they were out of the main field of battle, skirmishing on the edge of an adjacent swamp. Richard Johnson ordered a suicide squad of twenty men to charge with him and draw the Indians' fire, with the rest to attack as the Indians reloaded. But he was unable to push his troops through the enemy position due to the swampy ground. Johnson had to order his men to dismount and hold until Shelby's infantry came up. By then, under the pressure of Johnson's attack, the Native American force broke and fled into the swamp, during which time Tecumseh was slain.

The question of who shot and killed Tecumseh was highly controversial in Johnson's lifetime, as he was most often named as the shooter. Johnson himself did not publicly say that he had killed Tecumseh, stating that he had killed "a tall, good-looking Indian", but initial published accounts named him, and it was not until 1816 that another claimant, a man named David King, appeared. John Sugden, in his book on the Battle of the Thames, found that Johnson's "claim is surely the stronger". Jones suggested that the issue did not truly catch the public's attention until Johnson became a potential candidate for national office in the 1830s, and was promoted through such means as a campaign biography, stage play and song. In any event, he found, "Colonel Johnson truly was a war hero at the Battle of the Thames. By ... leading the suicide mission on horseback, more lives were saved than lost. Johnson was lucky to have been only wounded, since fifteen men died instantly during the charge."

There are reports from Indians that support Johnson's account, but most were made decades after the battle, by which time the question of whether Johnson shot Tecumseh had become politically charged. Tecumseh was said to have been shot from a firearm pointed at a downward angle, as if from a horse, with a ball and three buckshot, which Johnson's pistol was said to be loaded with. Evidence that it was so loaded is lacking, and the angle of the wound did not exclude the possibility that he had been stooping when shot. Some accounts have muskets loaded with cartridges containing a ball and three buckshot being commonly carried by American soldiers, and whether the Americans identified the proper body as Tecumseh (whose death was attested to by British officers who had been at the battle) is another source of contention.

On April 4, 1818, an act of Congress requested that the President of the United States present to Johnson a sword in honor of his "daring and distinguished valor" at the Battle of the Thames. The sword was presented to Johnson by President James Monroe in April 1820. Johnson was one of only 14 military officers to be presented a sword by an act of Congress prior to the American Civil War.

==== Return to Washington ====
With the American success at the Battle of the Thames, the war in the northwest was effectively over. Although there was no organized resistance to his presence in Canada, Harrison withdrew to Detroit because of supply problems. Johnson remained, wounded, at Detroit as his men began their return to Kentucky. Once he had recovered enough to bear the journey, he was conveyed home in a bed in a carriage, arriving there in early November 1813. It took him five months to recover, though he was still left with a damaged left arm and hand, and was later described as walking with a limp. He returned to Congress in February 1814, but due to his wounds was unable to participate in debates until the following session of Congress. He received a hero's welcome, still suffering from war wounds that would plague him for the rest of his life.

In August 1814, British forces attacked Washington, D.C., and burned the White House and Capitol, and when Congress reconvened on September 19, with Johnson present, it was in temporary quarters. On September 22, Johnson moved for the appointment of a committee to look into why the British had been allowed to burn the city, and he was appointed as chairman. Johnson's committee compiled a voluminous report, but it was objected to by Representative Daniel Webster, who felt the report, including much correspondence, needed to be printed so that all congressmen could study it. This postponed any debate to 1815, by which time the Treaty of Ghent had been ratified, and the United States was again at peace. With Congress having little interest in debating the matter, it was dropped. Had the war continued, Johnson was ready to return to Kentucky to raise another military unit.

=== Post-war career in the House ===
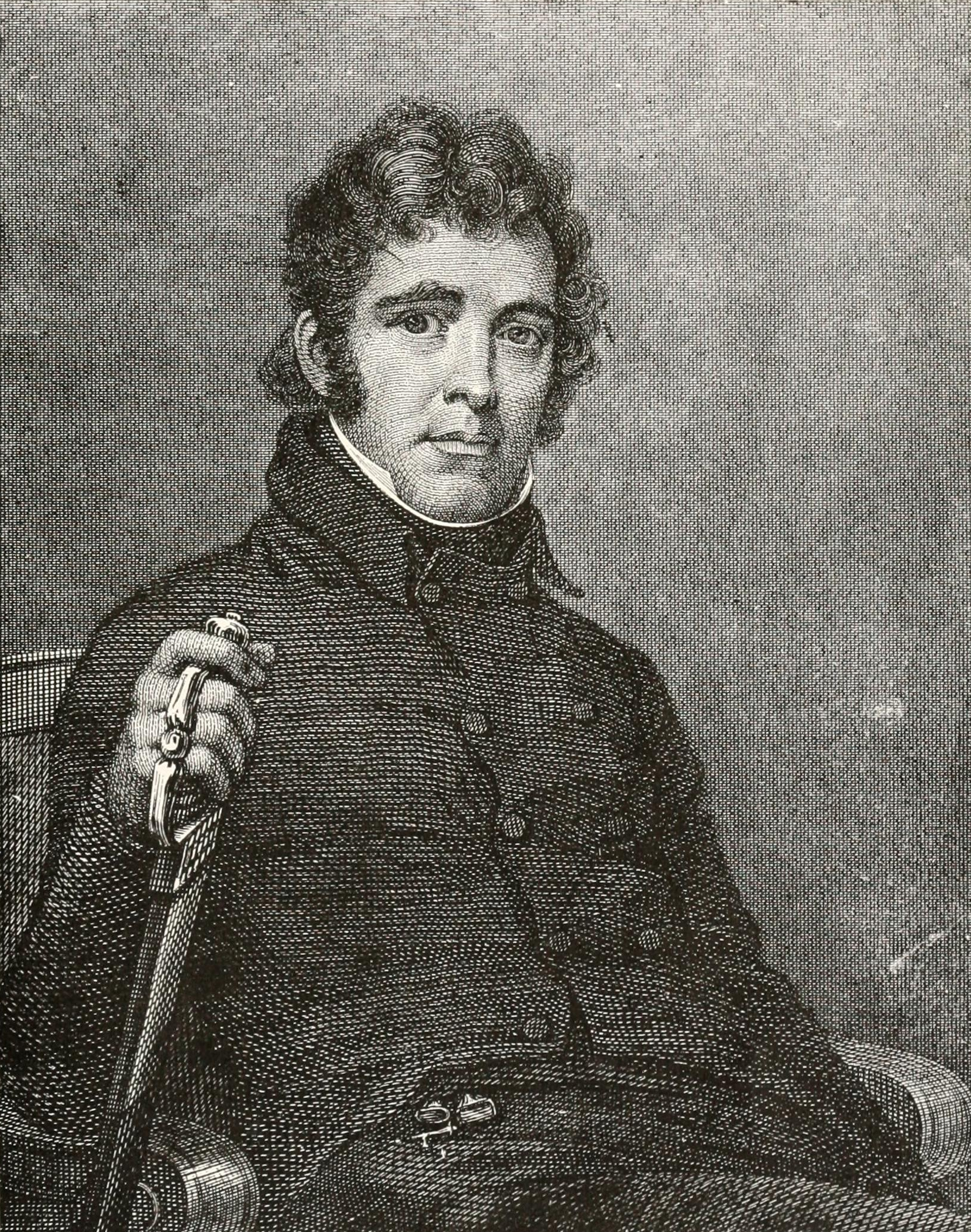
Portrait of Johnson in uniform

With the end of the war, Johnson, who was made chairman of the House Committee on Military Affairs, turned his legislative attention to issues such as securing pensions for widows and orphans and funding internal improvements in the West. There were widespread reports of Americans, including women and children, captured by Indians during the war, and Johnson used his congressional office to investigate these matters, and to try to secure the release of captives. Western Democratic-Republicans like Johnson strongly supported the military and urged aid for the veterans; in December 1815, Johnson introduced legislation for the "relief of the infirm, disabled, and superannuated officers and soldiers". Fearing that the United States Military Academy at West Point, New York produced dandies, not soldiers, Johnson expanded on a proposal by President Madison to establish three additional military academies, urging the placement of one of them in Kentucky. Despite the support of such influential members of the House as Clay and John C. Calhoun, the proposal did not pass, but Johnson worked to have federal facilities built in the West throughout his time in Congress.

Johnson believed that Congressional business was too slow and tedious and that the per diem system of compensation encouraged delays on the part of members. To remedy this, he sponsored legislation to pay annual salaries of $1,500 to congressmen rather than a $6 per diem for the days the body was in session. At the time, this had the effect of increasing the total compensation from about $900 to $1500. Johnson noted that congressmen had not had a pay increase in 27 years, during which time the cost of living had greatly increased, and that $1,500 was less than the salaries of 28 of the clerks employed by the government. The popular Johnson's sponsorship of the measure provided political cover for proponents; Maryland's Robert Wright wondered how his colleagues would feel if, "the highly honorable mover of this bill, who slew Tecumseh with his own hands ... he who came up here covered with wounds and glory, with his favorite war-horse and his more favorite servant—his attendant in the army, his nurse and necessary assistant" was "obliged to sell his war-horse or his servant"; salaries would prevent such things from coming to pass. The bill passed the House and Senate quickly and was made law on March 19, 1816. But, the measure proved extremely unpopular with voters, in part because it gave Congress an immediate pay raise, rather than waiting until after the next election. (Note: Today, this would violate the Twenty-seventh Amendment.) Many members who supported the bill lost their seats as a result, including Johnson's colleague Solomon P. Sharp from Kentucky. Johnson's overall popularity helped him retain his seat against a challenge, one of only 15 of 81 who voted to pass the bill to keep their seats in the House. The old Congress met for a lame-duck session in December, repealed the new law effective when the new Congress was sworn in, but at Johnson's suggestion, did not revive the old per diem, thus forcing the new legislators to act on the matter if they wanted to get paid. Compensation for members of Congress remained on a per diem basis until an annual salary of $3,000 (~$81,979 in 2025) was prescribed in 1855. According to Edward J. McManus, who wrote Johnson's entry in the American National Biography, "Johnson, instead of defending the merits of the reform, avoided the backlash by pledging to work for the repeal of his own measure. He justified his reversal by arguing that representatives should reflect the popular will, but lack of political stamina may have been closer to the truth."

Johnson disliked the idea of a national bank, and had voted in 1811 not to renew the charter of the First Bank of the United States. Calhoun's bill for a Second Bank of the United States passed Congress in early 1816. Johnson was opposed, but was absent for the vote, busy with other matters. A bonus was to be paid to the government by the Second Bank, and a bill was introduced early in 1817 to spend that money on internal improvements. Although Johnson was opposed to the national bank, he supported the bill, believing that the improvements to transportation would benefit his constituents, and the bill passed the House by two votes. Madison, then in his final days in office, vetoed the bill. Johnson joined the effort to override the veto, but it failed. The break from the administration was unusual for Johnson, but he believed the war had shown the need for better roads and canals.

When he took office in 1817, President James Monroe's first choice for Secretary of War was Henry Clay, who declined the position. The post ultimately went to Calhoun. The result was that Johnson became chair of the Committee on Expenditures where he wielded considerable influence over defense policy in the Department of War during the Fifteenth Congress. In 1817, Congress investigated General Andrew Jackson's execution of two British subjects during the First Seminole War. Johnson chaired the inquiry committee. The majority of the committee favored a negative report and a censure for Jackson. Johnson, a Jackson supporter, drafted a minority report that was more favorable to Jackson and opposed the censure. The ensuing debate pitted Johnson against fellow Kentuckian Clay. Johnson's report prevailed, and Jackson was spared censure. This disagreement between Johnson and Clay, however, marked the beginning of a political separation between the two that lasted for the duration of their careers.

In 1818, Calhoun approved an expedition to build a military outpost near the present site of Bismarck, North Dakota on the Yellowstone River; Johnson awarded the contract to his brother James. Although the Yellowstone Expedition was an ultimate failure and expensive to the U.S. Treasury, the Johnsons escaped political ill will in their home district because the venture was seen as a peacekeeping endeavor on the frontier. However, the Panic of 1819 caused Congress to investigate the Yellowstone matter, and in 1820, a report found that James Johnson had overcharged the government by $76,000. Richard and James Johnson, as well as other family members, remained in debt until 1824, when arrangements were made with the largest creditor, the Second Bank of the United States, to settle the liabilities.

=== Senator ===
==== Monroe years (1819–1825) ====
Johnson announced his intent to retire from the House of Representatives in early 1818. Sources differ on why he did; David Petriello, in his biography of Johnson, stated that the Kentucky congressman had determined to move on to the Senate; an earlier biographer, Leland Winfield Meyer stated that Johnson's departure from the House was because he believed in rotation in office and felt he had served there long enough. Jones stated that Johnson planned to return to private life to deal with family business interests.

Under the original federal Constitution, state legislators, not the voters, elected U.S. senators, and the Kentucky General Assembly was to choose a replacement for outgoing senator Isham Talbot in December 1818. Johnson was considered a strong contender if he entered the race, and in October he let it be known through the press that he would accept the Senate seat if the General Assembly elected him. On December 18, 1818, legislators chose William Logan over Johnson, 67–55. Newspapers noted that the former congressman had never officially declared his candidacy, and that Johnson's political friends intended to nominate him for governor in the 1820 election.

Johnson's term in the House expired March 3, 1819, but by August, he had been elected to the Kentucky House of Representatives, where he worked to secure passage of a law that abolished imprisonment for debtors in the state, though it did not pass until 1821. But when Senator John J. Crittenden resigned in November 1819, the legislature was called upon to fill the seat. The following month, the General Assembly elected Johnson to the Senate in a 68–53 vote over John Adair, who would be Kentucky's next governor.

Johnson was sworn in on January 3, 1820. The Senate was at that time grappling with the admission of the Missouri Territory and the Maine District (then part of Massachusetts) as states. When a bill was introduced which would bar slavery in the territories north and west of Missouri, Johnson was assigned to a select committee of five senators to consider it. The Maine and Missouri questions had been combined into one bill; Johnson voted against an amendment to separate them, which was defeated.

On February 17, the Senate voted to bar slavery outside Missouri in the part of the Louisiana Purchase north of the 36°30′ north latitude line, with Johnson voting in favor. The bill passed, and was signed by President Monroe in March. Missouri's admission was delayed due to controversial clauses in its draft constitution, such as one forbidding the entry to the state of free African-Americans. Johnson served on the committee of House and Senate members which brokered a resolution, enabling Missouri's admission in August 1821.

Johnson was re-elected to a full term in 1822, so that in total, his Senate tenure ran from December 10, 1819, to March 4, 1829. In 1821, he introduced legislation chartering Columbian College (later The George Washington University) in Washington, D.C. During this time period, his views on Western expansion were clear. He believed that the US "empire of liberty" should extend across the continent, arguing in debates leading up to the Missouri Compromise that western expansion and emancipation should go hand in hand, acknowledging issues with white racism but advocating for gradual emancipation. Furthermore, he went against the ideas put forward by sympathizers of the Colonization movement, arguing in "favor of meaningfully incorporating people of color into a multiracial empire".

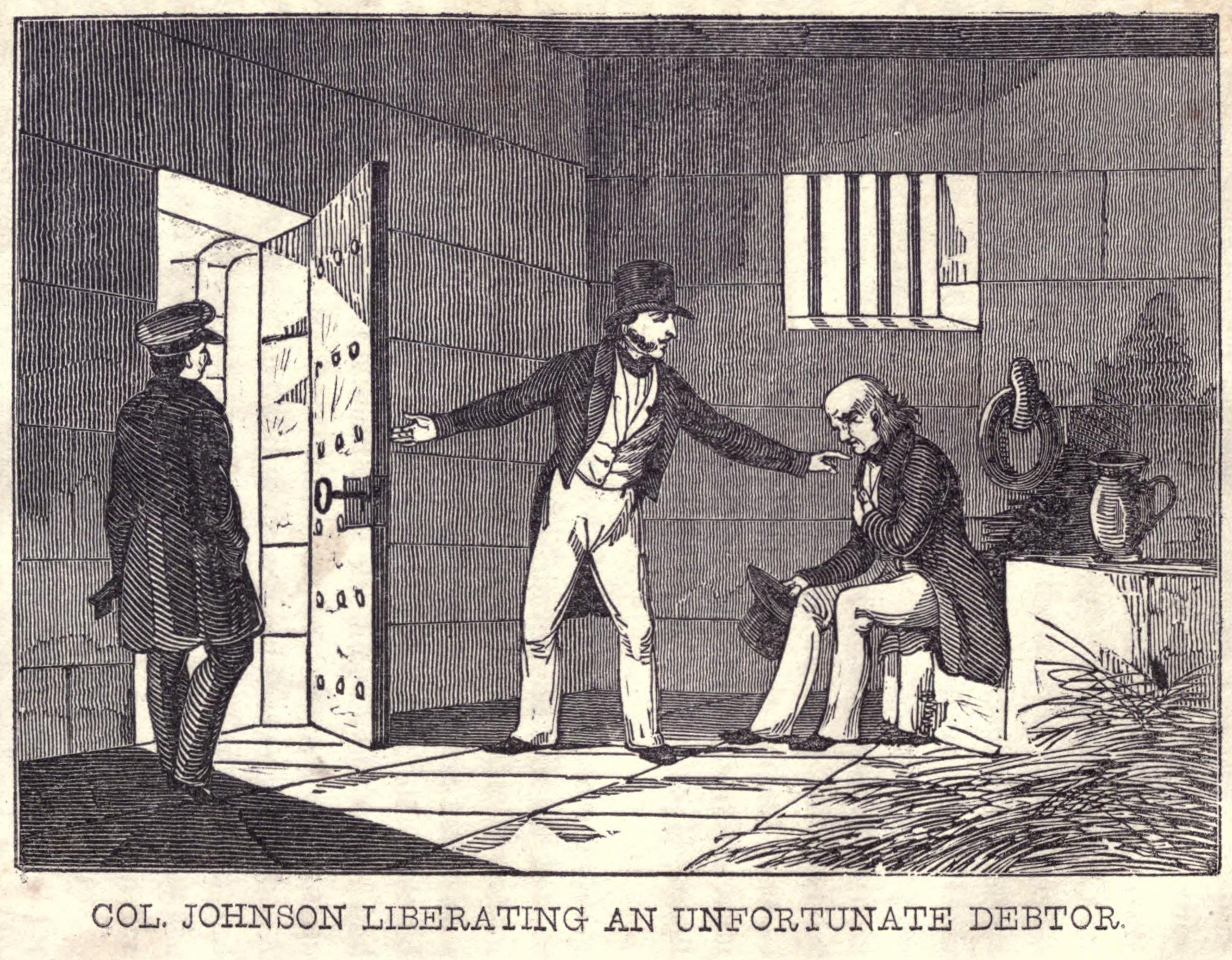
"Col. Johnson liberating an unfortunate debtor," an illustration published in an 1843 biographical sketch of Johnson

In December 1822, Johnson introduced legislation to abolish imprisonment for debt at the federal level. He first spoke to the issue in the Senate on December 14, 1822, pointing to the positive effects its cessation had effected in his home state. The bill failed, but Johnson persisted in re-introducing it every year. In 1824, it passed the Senate but was too late to be acted upon by the House. It passed the Senate a second time in 1828, but again, the House failed to act on it, and the measure died for some years, owing to Johnson's exit from the Senate the next year. Passage would have made only a modest impact since few were imprisoned for debt at the federal level, but Johnson hoped to advance the cause of abolishing it in the states. The reform was opposed by the business community, but Jackson's support after he became president in 1829 eventually gave the movement fresh life, and a limited bill was passed in 1832. Within ten years after that, imprisonment for debt had been abolished in most states.

Johnson also sought help for debtors not in prison, such as some form of bankruptcy legislation, which would help his own problems and those of his neighbors. Johnson knew this politically pressing issue, which he worked on into the 1830s, quite well because it affected him personally. He was in debt himself from his business losses and support for Western expansion. He also continued to advocate for the positions he had held while a member of the House. As the chair of the Committee on Military Affairs, Johnson pushed for higher veterans pensions, and a liberal policy to enable settlers to buy land in the West more easily.

==== Adams opponent (1825–1829) ====
The congressional nominating caucus system for choosing presidential and vice presidential candidates was unpopular by 1824, though a caucus did choose William H. Crawford of Georgia. State legislatures chose the other presidential candidates: Clay, Jackson and Secretary of State John Quincy Adams. Johnson supported Clay, his fellow Kentuckian, and Clay gained the state's electoral votes. Jackson led in both the popular and electoral vote for president, but did not have a majority, so the election for president was thrown into the House of Representatives, though Calhoun gained a majority of the electoral vote for vice president. Clay had finished fourth in electoral vote, and as the Constitution limits the House's choice to the top three finishers, he was eliminated. Johnson supported Jackson, and there were rumors Johnson would be Secretary of War in a Jackson administration. Clay threw his support to Adams, who was elected, and many believed Clay (who became Secretary of State) and Adams had made a Corrupt Bargain. Johnson was the one who informed Jackson of this. Many of Jackson's supporters were enraged by the outcome, including Johnson, who promised to oppose the Adams administration: "for by the Eternal, if they act as pure as the angels that stand at the right hand of the throne of God, we'll put them down". Johnson opposed Adams's policies, and became a member of the faction, later the Democratic Party, that New York Senator Martin Van Buren was forming to promote Jackson's candidacy in 1828.

Already known for securing government contracts for himself, as well as his brothers and friends, he offered land to establish the Choctaw Academy, a school devoted to the European-American education of Indians from the Southeast tribes. Johnson had tried to establish an Indian school at Great Crossings in 1818, partnering with the Kentucky Baptist Society, but the school folded in 1821 after it failed to gain the support of the federal government or private donors. The new academy would come into being a few years later. The academy, sitting on his farm in Scott County in 1825, was overseen by Johnson; and not only was part of treaty negotiations with the Choctaw Nation but appealed to his colleagues as a form "peaceful conquest" or "expansion with honor" as Henry Knox put it. Although he never ran afoul of the conflict of interest standards of his day, some of his colleagues considered his actions ethically questionable. Johnson was paid well for the school by the federal government, which gave him a portion of the annuities for the Choctaw. It was promoted by the Baptist Missionary Society as well. Some European-American students also attended the academy, including his nephew Robert Ward Johnson from Arkansas.

Another pet project Johnson supported was prompted by his friendship with John Cleves Symmes Jr., who proposed that the Earth was hollow. In 1823, Johnson proposed in the Senate that the government fund an expedition to the center of the Earth. The proposal was soundly defeated, receiving only twenty-five votes in the House and Senate combined.

Johnson served as chairman of the Committee on Post Office and Post Roads during the Nineteenth and Twentieth Congresses. Near the end of his term in the Senate, petitioners asked Congress to prevent the handling and delivery of mail on Sunday because it violated biblical principles about not working on the Sabbath. These petitions were referred to Johnson's committee. In response, Johnson, a practicing Baptist, drafted a report now commonly referred to as The Sunday Mail Report. In the report, presented to Congress on January 19, 1829, Johnson argued that government was "a civil, and not a religious institution", and as such could not legislate the tenets of any particular denomination. The report was applauded as an elegant defense of the doctrine of separation of church and state. But Johnson was criticized for conflicts of interest in his defense, as he had friends who were contracted to haul mail, and who would have suffered financially from such a ban.

In 1828, Johnson was an unsuccessful candidate for re-election, owing in part to his relationship with the biracial slave Julia Chinn, with whom he lived in a common-law marriage. Although residents of his own district seemed little bothered by the arrangement, slaveholders elsewhere in the state were not so forgiving. The Democratic Party in Kentucky was split, with enough dissidents to be able to join with the opposition to block Johnson's re-election. Johnson's managers withdrew his name and proposed George M. Bibb, who was elected. In his own defense, Johnson said, "Unlike Jefferson, Clay, Poindexter and others I married my wife under the eyes of God, and apparently He has found no objections." (The named men were suspected or known to have similar relationships with slave women.) According to Henry Robert Burke, what people objected to was Johnson trying to introduce his daughters to "polite society". People were used to planters and overseers having relationships with slave women, but they were expected to deny them.

=== Return to the House ===
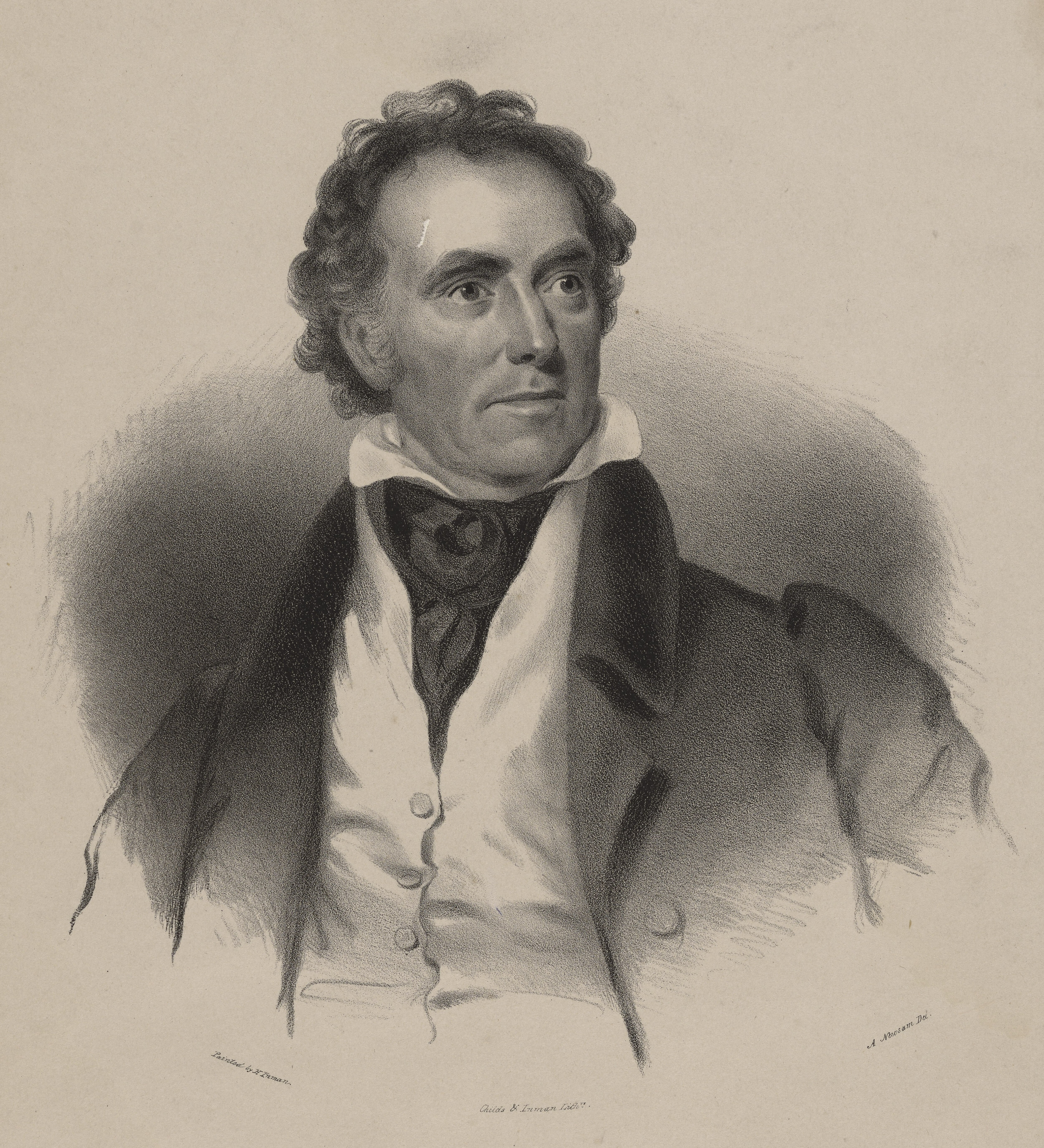
Lithograph by Albert Newsam, 1832

After his failed Senatorial re-election bid, Johnson returned to the House, representing Kentucky's Fifth District from 1829 to 1833, and Thirteenth District from 1833 to 1837. During the Twenty-first and Twenty-second Congresses, he again served as chairman of the Committee on Post Office and Post Roads. In this capacity, he was again asked to address the question of Sunday mail delivery. He drew up a second report, largely similar in content to the first, arguing against legislation preventing mail delivery on Sunday. The report, commonly called "Col. Johnson's second Sunday mail report", was delivered to Congress in March 1830.

Some contemporaries doubted Johnson's authorship of this second report. Many claimed it was instead written by Amos Kendall. Kendall claimed he had seen the report only after it had been drafted and said he had only altered "one or two words". Kendall speculated that the author could be Reverend O.B. Brown, but historian Leland Meyer concludes that there is no reason to doubt that Johnson authored the report himself.

Johnson chaired the Committee on Military Affairs during the Twenty-second, Twenty-third, and Twenty-fourth Congresses. Beginning in 1830, there arose a groundswell of public support for Johnson's "pet project" of ending debt imprisonment. The subject began to appear more frequently in President Jackson's addresses to the legislature. Johnson chaired a House committee to report on the subject, and delivered the committee's report on January 17, 1832. Later that year, a bill abolishing the practice of debt imprisonment passed both houses of Congress, and was signed into law on July 14.

Johnson's stands won him widespread popularity and endorsement by George H. Evans, Robert Dale Owen, and Theophilus Fisk for the presidency in 1832, but Johnson abandoned his campaign when Andrew Jackson announced he would seek a second term. He then began campaigning to become Jackson's running mate, but Jackson favored Martin Van Buren instead. At the Democratic National Convention, Johnson finished a distant third in the vice-presidential balloting, receiving only the votes of the Kentucky, Indiana, and Illinois delegations; William B. Lewis had to persuade him to withdraw

=== Election of 1836 ===
After the election of 1832, Johnson continued to campaign for the vice presidency which would be available in 1836. He was endorsed by the New York labor leader Ely Moore on March 13, 1833, nine days after Jackson and Van Buren were inaugurated. Moore praised his devotion to freedom of religion and his opposition to imprisonment for debt. (Note: Note that Emmons, like Langworthy, was published in New York City.)

William Emmons, the Boston printer, published a biography of Johnson in New York dated July 1833. Richard Emmons, from Great Crossing, Kentucky, followed this up with a play entitled Tecumseh, of the Battle of the Thames and a poem in honor of Johnson. Many of Johnson's friends and supporters – Davy Crockett and John Bell among them – encouraged him to run for president. Jackson, however, supported Vice President Van Buren for the office. Johnson accepted this choice, and worked to gain the nomination for vice president.

Emmons's poem provided the line that became Johnson's campaign slogan: "Rumpsey Dumpsey, Rumpsey Dumpsey, Colonel Johnson killed Tecumseh." Jackson supported Johnson for vice-president, thinking that the war hero would balance the ticket with Van Buren, who had not served in the War of 1812. Jackson made his decision based on Johnson's loyalty but also the president's anger at the primary rival candidate, William Cabell Rives.

Despite Jackson's support, the party was far from united behind Johnson. Van Buren preferred Rives as a running mate. In a letter to Jackson, Tennessee Supreme Court justice John Catron doubted that "a lucky random shot, even if it did hit Tecumseh, qualifies a man for the vice presidency." Although Johnson was a "widower" after Chinn's death in 1833, there was still dissension related to Johnson's open relationship with a slave. The 1835 Democratic National Convention, in Baltimore, in May 1835, was held under the two-thirds rule, largely to demonstrate Van Buren's wide popularity. Although Van Buren was nominated unanimously, Johnson barely obtained the necessary two-thirds of the vote. (A motion was made to change the rule, but it obtained only a bare majority, not two-thirds.)

Tennessee's delegation did not attend the convention. Edward Rucker, a Tennessean who happened to be in Baltimore, was picked to cast its 15 votes, so that all the states would endorse Van Buren. Senator Silas Wright, of New York, prevailed upon Rucker to vote for Johnson, giving him just more than twice the votes cast for Rives, and the nomination.

Jackson's faith in Johnson to balance the ticket proved misplaced. In the general election, Johnson cost the Democrats votes in the South, where his relationship with Chinn was particularly unpopular. He also failed to garner much support from the West, where he was supposed to be strong due to his reputation as an Indian fighter and war hero. He even failed to deliver his home state of Kentucky for the Democrats. Regardless, the Democrats still won the popular vote.

When the electoral vote was counted in Congress on February 8, 1837, Van Buren was found to have received 170 votes for president, but Johnson had received only 147 for vice-president. Although Virginia had elected electors pledged to both Van Buren and Johnson, the state's 23 "faithless electors" refused to vote for Johnson, leaving him one electoral vote short of a majority. For the only time, the Senate was charged with electing the vice president as Twelfth Amendment required the Senate to choose the vice president from the top two candidates if none of them received a majority. The vote on February 8, 1837 divided mostly along party lines, with Johnson becoming vice-president by a vote of 33, as opposed to 16 for Francis Granger; three senators were absent.

== Vice presidency (1837–1841) ==
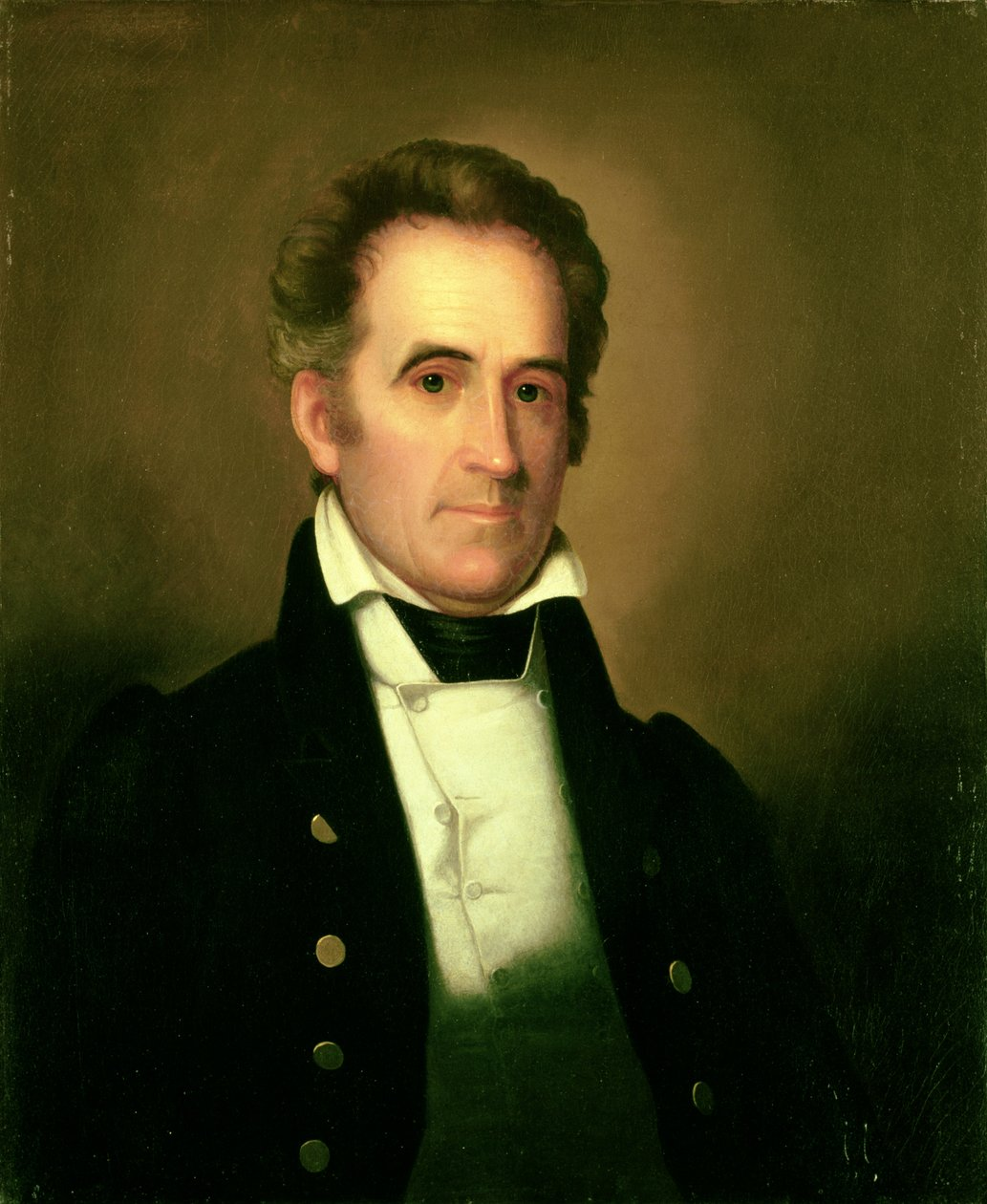
Portrait of a middle-aged Johnson by Rembrandt Peale

Johnson served as vice president from March 4, 1837, to March 4, 1841. His term was largely unremarkable, and he enjoyed little influence with President Van Buren. His penchant for wielding his power for his own interests did not abate. He lobbied the Senate to promote Samuel Milroy, whom he owed a favor, to the position of Indian agent. When Lewis Tappan requested presentation of an abolitionist petition to the Senate, Johnson, who was still a slaveholder, declined the request.

As presiding officer of the Senate, Johnson was called on to cast a tie-breaking vote fourteen times, more than all of his predecessors save John Adams and John Calhoun. Despite the precedent set by some of his predecessors, Johnson never addressed the Senate on the occasion of a tie-breaking vote; however, on one occasion, he did explain his vote — via an article in the Kentucky Gazette.

After the financial Panic of 1837, Johnson took a nine-month leave of absence, during which he returned home to Kentucky and opened a tavern and spa on his farm to offset his continued financial problems. Upon visiting the establishment, Amos Kendall wrote to President Van Buren that he found Johnson "happy in the inglorious pursuit of tavern keeping – even giving his personal superintendence to the chicken and egg purchasing and water-melon selling department".

In his later political career, he became known for wearing a bright red vest and tie. He adopted this dress during his term as vice-president when he and James Reeside, a mail contractor known for his drab dress, passed a tailor's shop that displayed a bright red cloth in the window. Johnson suggested that Reeside should wear a red vest because the mail coaches he owned and operated were red. Reeside agreed to do so if Johnson would also. Both men ordered red vests and neckties, and were known for donning this attire for the rest of their lives.

=== Election of 1840 ===
By 1840, it had become clear that Johnson was a liability to the Democratic ticket. Even former president Jackson conceded that Johnson was "dead wait [sic]," and threw his support to James K. Polk. President Van Buren stood for re-election, and the Whigs once again countered with William Henry Harrison. Van Buren was reluctant to drop Johnson from the ticket, fearing that dropping the Democrats' own war hero would split the party and cost him votes to Harrison. A unique compromise ensued, with the Democratic National Convention refusing to nominate Johnson, or any other candidate, for vice president. The idea was to allow the states to choose their own candidates, or perhaps return the question to the Senate should Van Buren be elected with no clear winner in the vice-presidential race.

Undaunted by this lack of confidence from his peers, Johnson continued to campaign to retain his office. Although his campaign was more vigorous than that of Van Buren, his behavior on the campaign trail raised concern among voters. He made rambling, incoherent speeches. During one speech in Ohio, he raised his shirt in order to display to the crowd the wounds that he had received during the Battle of the Thames. Charges he leveled against Harrison in Cleveland were so poorly received that they touched off a riot in the city.

In the end, Johnson received only forty-eight electoral votes. One elector from Virginia and all eleven from South Carolina voted for Van Buren for president but selected someone other than Johnson for vice-president. Johnson lost his home state of Kentucky again and his home district.

== Post-vice presidency (1841–1850) ==
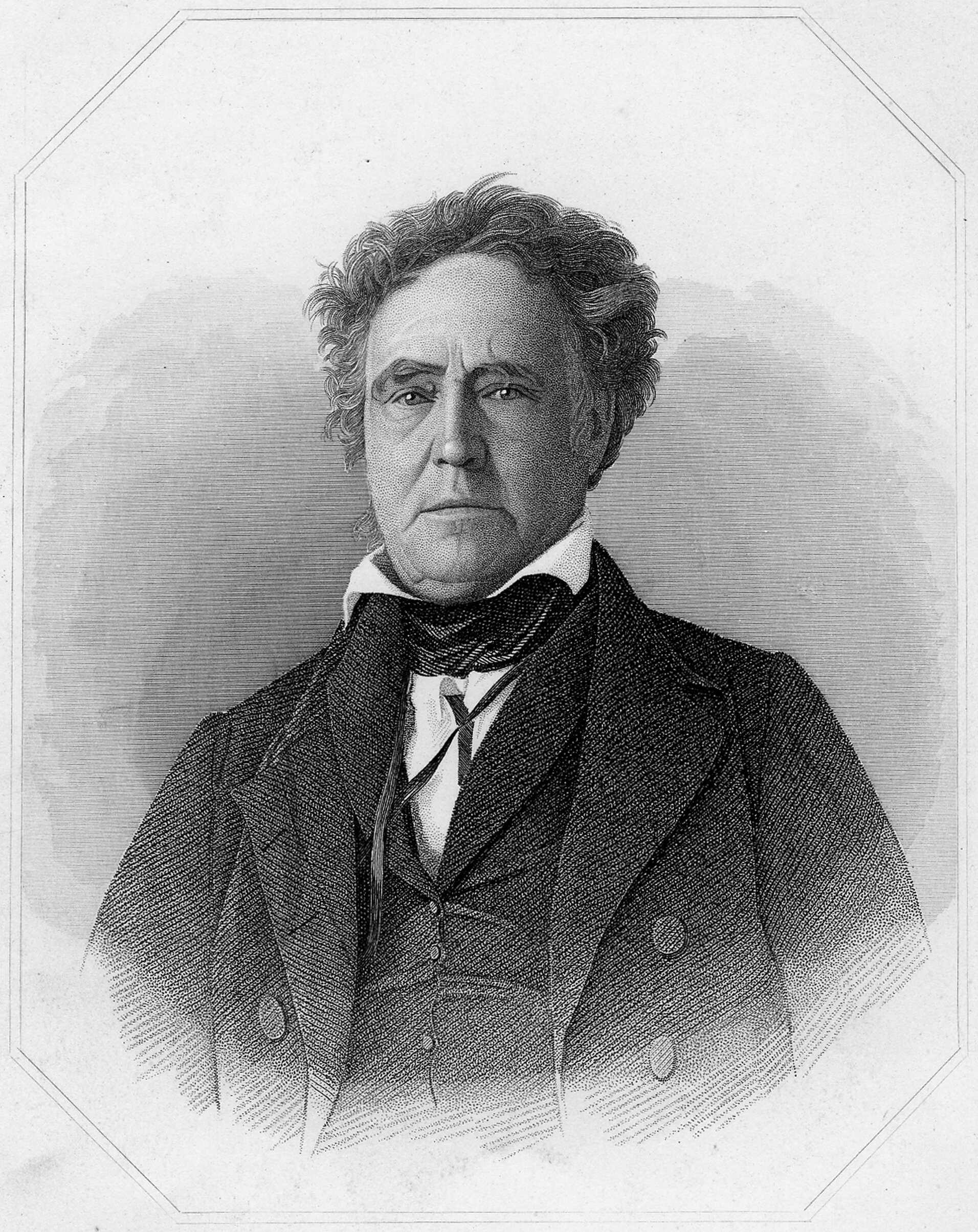
Engraving of Johnson by J. B. Forrest, from a daguerreotype miniature by I. T. Warner, published in The United States Magazine and Democratic Review in 1844

After his term as vice president, Johnson returned to Kentucky to tend to his farm and oversee his tavern. He again represented Scott County in the Kentucky House from 1841 to 1843. In 1845, he served as a pallbearer when Daniel Boone was re-interred in Frankfort Cemetery.

Johnson never gave up on a return to public service. He ran an unsuccessful campaign for the U.S. Senate against John J. Crittenden in 1842. He briefly and futilely sought his party's nomination for president in 1844. He also ran as an independent candidate for Governor of Kentucky in 1848, but after talking with the Democratic candidate, Lazarus W. Powell, who had replaced Linn Boyd on the ticket, Johnson decided to drop out and back Powell. Some speculated that the real object of this campaign was to secure another nomination to the vice-presidency, but this hope was denied.

Johnson finally returned to elected office in 1850, when he was elected to the Kentucky House of Representatives. By this time, however, his physical and mental health was already failing. On November 9, the Louisville Daily Journal reported that "Col. R. M. Johnson is laboring under an attack of dementia, which renders him totally unfit for business. It is painful to see him on the floor attempting to discharge the duties of a member. He is incapable of properly exercising his physical or mental powers."

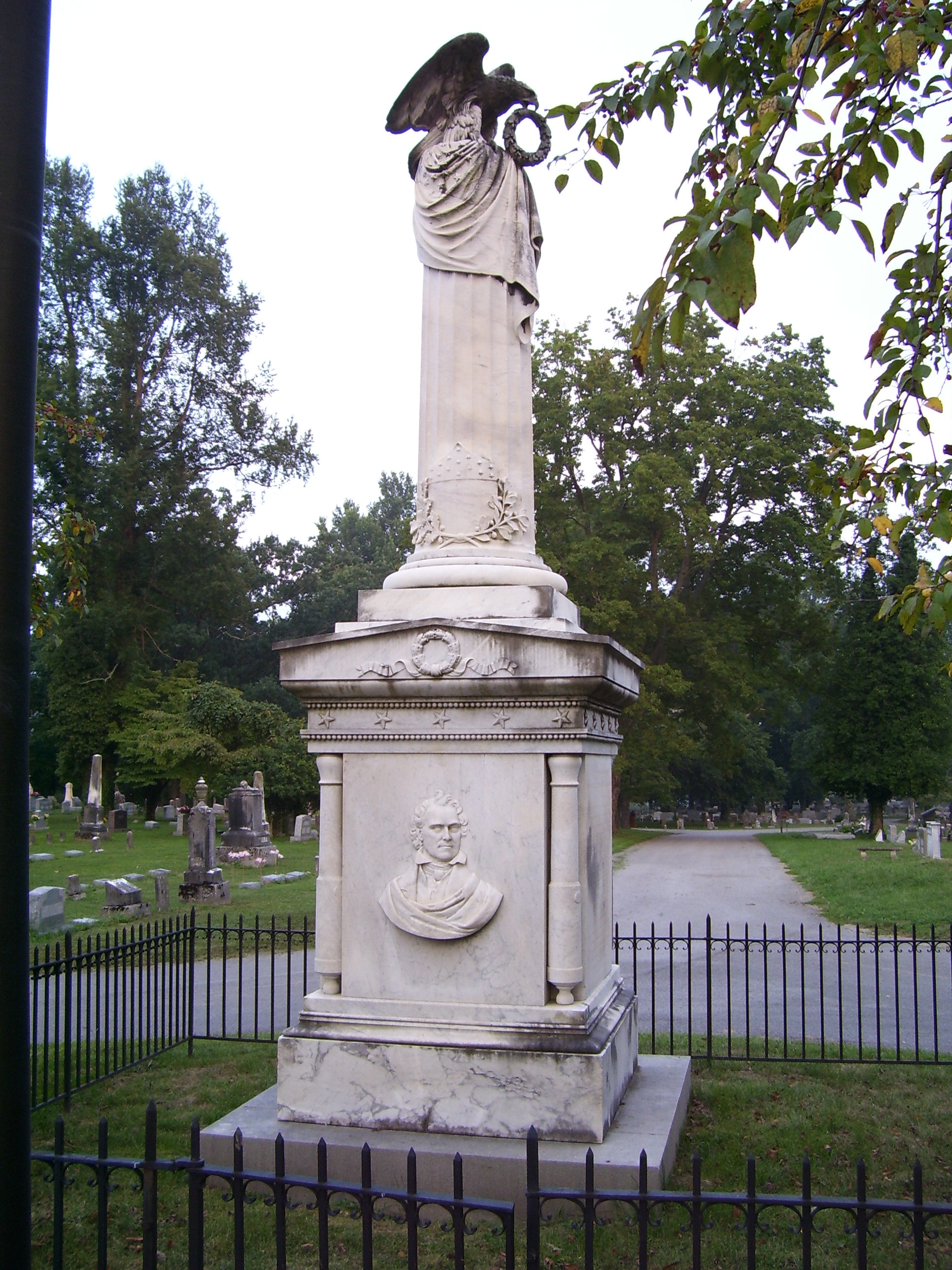
Johnson's gravesite at Frankfort Cemetery

He died of a stroke on November 19, just two weeks into his term, aged 70. He was interred in the Frankfort Cemetery, in Frankfort, Kentucky.

== Legacy ==
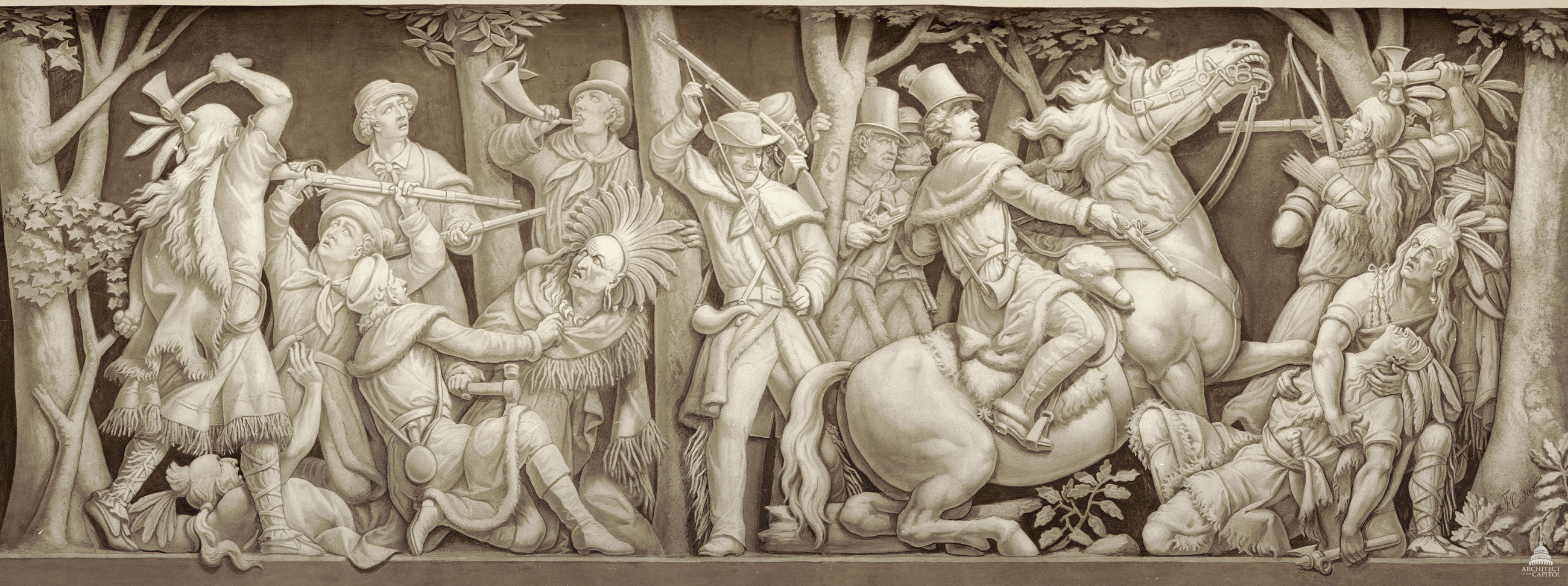
Johnson (center right) killing Tecumseh, from the frieze of the rotunda of the U.S. Capitol

Counties in four U.S. states are named for Johnson, namely in Illinois, Kentucky, Missouri, and Nebraska. Richard Mentor Johnson is also the namesake of Dick Johnson Township, Indiana.

His political prominence led to a family dynasty: his brothers James and John Telemachus Johnson, and his nephew Robert Ward Johnson were all elected to the House of Representatives, the first two from Kentucky, and Robert from Arkansas. Robert was later elected as a senator before the Civil War.

== See also ==
- List of federal political sex scandals in the United States
- List of people from Kentucky

== Notes ==
U.S. House of Representatives
| Preceded by Thomas Sandford | Member of the U.S. House of Representatives from Kentucky's 4th congressional district 1807–1813 | Succeeded by Joseph Desha |
| Preceded by Stephen Ormsby | Member of the U.S. House of Representatives from Kentucky's 3rd congressional district 1813–1819 | Succeeded by William Brown |
| Preceded by Robert L. McHatton | Member of the U.S. House of Representatives from Kentucky's 5th congressional district 1829–1833 | Succeeded by Robert P. Letcher |
| New constituency | Member of the U.S. House of Representatives from Kentucky's 13th congressional district 1833–1837 | Succeeded by William Southgate |
U.S. Senate
| Preceded by John J. Crittenden | U.S. Senator (Class 2) from Kentucky; 1819–1829; Served alongside: William Logan, Isham Talbot, John Rowan | Succeeded by George M. Bibb |
Party political offices
| Preceded by Martin Van Buren | Democratic nominee for Vice President of the United States; 1836^{1}, 1840^{2} | Succeeded by George M. Dallas |
Political offices
| Preceded by Martin Van Buren | Vice President of the United States; 1837–1841 | Succeeded by John Tyler |
Notes and references
1. The Democratic vice presidential nomination split this year between Johnson and William Smith.; 2. The Democratic vice presidential nomination split this year between Johnson, Littleton Tazewell and James K. Polk.
