= 1832–33 United States Senate elections =

- Dates vary by state
- Class 1

16 of the 48 seats in the United States Senate (plus special elections) 25 seats needed for a majority
	Majority party	Minority party
Party	National Republican	Jacksonian
Last election	20 seats	26 seats
Seats before	22	24
Seats won	8	6
Seats after	23	21
Seat change	▲1	▼3
Seats up	7	9
	Third party
Party	Nullifier
Last election	1 seat
Seats before	2
Seats won	0
Seats after	2
Seat change	Steady
Seats up	0
- Results: Jacksonian hold Jacksonian gain Anti-Jacksonian hold Anti-Jacksonian gain Nullifier hold Legislature failed to elect
Majority Party before election
Jacksonian
Elected Majority Party
Anti-Jacksonian

The 1832–33 United States Senate elections were held on various dates in various states. As these U.S. Senate elections were prior to the ratification of the Seventeenth Amendment in 1913, senators were chosen by state legislatures. Senators were elected over a wide range of time throughout 1832 and 1833, and a seat may have been filled months late or remained vacant due to legislative deadlock. In these elections, terms were up for the senators in Class 1.

The Anti-Jacksonian coalition assumed control of the Senate from the Jacksonian coalition, despite Andrew Jackson's victory in the 1832 presidential election.

== Change in composition ==
=== Before the elections ===
After the January 3, 1832 special election in Indiana.

						NR_{1}	NR_{2}	NR_{3}	NR_{4}
NR_{14}	NR_{13}	NR_{12}	NR_{11}	NR_{10}	NR_{9}	NR_{8}	NR_{7}	NR_{6}	NR_{5}
NR_{15}	NR_{16} Conn. Ran	NR_{17} Del. Ran	NR_{18} Mass. Ran	NR_{19} R.I. Ran	NR_{20} Maine; Retired	NR_{21} Ohio; Retired	NR_{22} Vt. Retired	N_{1} S.C. Hold	N_{2}
Majority (with VP tie-breaking vote) →									J_{24} Pa. Retired
J_{15}	J_{16} Ind. Ran	J_{17} Mo. Ran	J_{18} Tenn. Ran	J_{19} Va. Ran	J_{20} Md. Unknown	J_{21} Miss. Unknown	J_{22} N.J. Unknown	J_{23} N.Y. Unknown	J_{24} Pa. Retired
J_{14}	J_{13}	J_{12}	J_{11}	J_{10}	J_{9}	J_{8}	J_{7}	J_{6}	J_{5}
						J_{1} N.Y. Hold	J_{2} Va. Hold	J_{3}	J_{4}

=== As a result of the regular elections ===
						NR_{1}	NR_{2}	NR_{3}	NR_{4}
NR_{14}	NR_{13}	NR_{12}	NR_{11}	NR_{10}	NR_{9}	NR_{8}	NR_{7}	NR_{6}	NR_{5}
NR_{15}	NR_{16} Del. Re-elected	NR_{17} Mass. Re-elected	NR_{18} R.I. Re-elected	NR_{19} Conn. Hold	NR_{20} Vt. Hold	NR_{21} Md. Gain	NR_{22} N.J. Gain	NR_{23} Va. Gain	N_{1}
Plurality ↑									N_{2}
J_{15}	J_{16} Ind. Re-elected	J_{17} Mo. Re-elected	J_{18} Tenn. Re-elected	J_{19} N.Y. Hold	J_{20} Maine; Gain	J_{21} Ohio; Gain	V_{1} Miss. J Loss	V_{2} Pa. J Loss	N_{2}
J_{14}	J_{13}	J_{12}	J_{11}	J_{10}	J_{9}	J_{8}	J_{7}	J_{6}	J_{5}
						J_{1}	J_{2}	J_{3}	J_{4}

=== At the beginning of the first session, December 2, 1833 ===
						NR_{1}	NR_{2}	NR_{3}	NR_{4}
NR_{14} Ala. Gain	NR_{13}	NR_{12}	NR_{11}	NR_{10}	NR_{9}	NR_{8}	NR_{7}	NR_{6}	NR_{5}
NR_{15} N.C. Gain	NR_{16}	NR_{17}	NR_{18}	NR_{19}	NR_{20}	NR_{21}	NR_{22}	NR_{23}	NR_{24}
Majority →									NR_{25}
J_{15} Ga. Hold	J_{16}	J_{17}	J_{18}	J_{19}	V_{1}	N_{2} S.C. Hold	N_{1}	NR_{26} Miss. Gain	NR_{25}
J_{14}	J_{13}	J_{12}	J_{11}	J_{10}	J_{9}	J_{8}	J_{7}	J_{6}	J_{5}
						J_{1}	J_{2}	J_{3}	J_{4}

Key:

NR_{#}	= Anti-Jacksonian
J_{#}	= Jacksonian
N_{#}	= Nullfier
V_{#}	= Vacant

== Race summaries ==
=== Special elections during the 22nd Congress ===
In these special elections, the winners were seated during 1832 or before March 4, 1833; ordered by election date.

State	Incumbent			Results	Candidates
State	Senator	Party	Electoral history	Results	Candidates
Indiana (Class 1)	Robert Hanna	National; Republican	1831 (appointed)	Interim appointee retired when elected successor qualified. New senator elected January 3, 1832. Winner was also elected to the next term, see below. Jacksonian gain.	▌ ✓ John Tipton (Jacksonian); [data missing]
Virginia (Class 2)	Littleton Waller Tazewell	Jacksonian	1824 (special); 1829	Incumbent resigned July 16, 1832. New senator elected December 10, 1832. Jacksonian hold.	▌ ✓ William C. Rives (Jacksonian); [data missing]
South Carolina (Class 2)	Robert Y. Hayne	Nullifier	1822; 1828	Incumbent resigned December 13, 1832 to become Governor of South Carolina. New senator elected December 29, 1832. Nullifier hold.	▌ ✓ John C. Calhoun (Nullifier); [data missing]
New York (Class 3)	William L. Marcy	Jacksonian	1831	Incumbent resigned January 1, 1833 to become Governor of New York. New senator elected January 4, 1833. Jacksonian hold.	▌ ✓ Silas Wright (Jacksonian); ▌John C. Spencer (Anti-Masonic); ▌James Burt (Unknown); ▌Gerrit Smith (Abolitionist); ▌James Kent (Unknown); ▌Albert Gallatin (Unknown); ▌Gideon Hawley (Unknown); ▌John Birdsall (Anti-Masonic); ▌Myron Holley (Unknown); ▌William Thompson (Unknown); ▌Albert H. Tracy (Anti-Masonic); ▌Samuel A. Foot (Unknown)

=== Races leading to the 23rd Congress ===
In these regular elections, the winner was seated on March 4, 1833; ordered by state.

All of the elections involved the Class 1 seats.

State	Incumbent			Results	Candidates
State	Senator	Party	Electoral history	Results	Candidates
Connecticut	Samuel A. Foot	National; Republican	1826	Incumbent lost re-election, and was then elected to the U.S. House of Representatives instead. New senator elected in 1832. National Republican hold.	▌ ✓ Nathan Smith (National Republican); [data missing]
Delaware	Arnold Naudain	National; Republican	1830 (special)	Incumbent re-elected in 1832.	▌ ✓ Arnold Naudain (National Republican); [data missing]
Indiana	John Tipton	Jacksonian	1832 (special)	Incumbent re-elected in 1832.	▌ ✓ John Tipton (Jacksonian); [data missing]
Maine	John Holmes	National; Republican	1820 (special); 1820; 1826 (retired or lost); 1829 (special)	Incumbent retired. Winner elected January 23, 1833. Jacksonian gain.	▌ ✓ Ether Shepley (Jacksonian) 61.5%; ▌Simon Greenleaf (National Republican) 35.0%; ▌William Pitt Preble (Jacksonian) 1.5%; ▌Isaac Isley (Unknown) 1.5%; ▌Arthur Ware (Unknown) 0.5%
Maryland	Samuel Smith	Jacksonian	1802; 1809; 1815 (lost); 1822 (special); 1827	Incumbent retired or lost re-election. New senator elected in 1833. National Republican gain.	▌ ✓ Joseph Kent (National Republican); [data missing]
Massachusetts	Daniel Webster	National; Republican	1827 (special)	Incumbent re-elected in 1833.	▌ ✓ Daniel Webster (National Republican); [data missing]
Mississippi	John Black	Jacksonian	1832 (Appointed)	Legislature failed to elect. Jacksonian loss. Incumbent would later be elected as an National Republican; see below.	[data missing]
Missouri	Thomas H. Benton	Jacksonian	1821; 1827	Incumbent re-elected in 1833.	▌ ✓ Thomas H. Benton (Jacksonian); [data missing]
New Jersey	Mahlon Dickerson	Jacksonian	1817; 1823; 1829 (resigned); 1829 (special)	Incumbent retired. New senator elected February 23, 1833. National Republican gain.	▌ ✓ Samuel L. Southard (National Republican) 37; ▌Robert F. Stockton (Jacksonian) 23
New York	Charles E. Dudley	Jacksonian	1829 (special)	Incumbent retired. New senator elected in 1833. Jacksonian hold.	▌ ✓ Nathaniel P. Tallmadge (Jacksonian); ▌Francis Granger (Anti-Masonic) (Note: also National Republican); ▌Benjamin Butler (Jacksonian)
Ohio	Benjamin Ruggles	National; Republican	1815; 1821; 1827	Incumbent retired. New senator elected in 1833. Jacksonian gain.	▌ ✓ Thomas Morris (Jacksonian); [data missing]
Pennsylvania	George M. Dallas	Jacksonian	1831 (special)	Incumbent retired. Legislature failed to elect. Jacksonian loss.	▌Samuel McKean (Jacksonian); ▌William Clark (Anti-Masonic); ▌Thomas H. Crawford (Jacksonian); ▌James Buchanan (Jacksonian); ▌Garrick Mallery (National Republican); ▌Adam King (Jacksonian)
Rhode Island	Asher Robbins	National; Republican	1825 (special); 1827	Incumbent re-elected January 19, 1833.	▌ ✓ Asher Robbins (National Republican) 41; ▌Elisha Reynolds Potter (Unknown) 25; ▌Dutee J. Pearce (Anti-Masonic) 12
Tennessee	Felix Grundy	Jacksonian	1829 (special)	Incumbent re-elected in 1833.	▌ ✓ Felix Grundy (Jacksonian); [data missing]
Vermont	Horatio Seymour	National; Republican	1821; 1827	Incumbent retired to run for Vermont Governor. New senator elected in 1833. National Republican hold.	▌ ✓ Benjamin Swift (National Republican); [data missing]
Virginia	John Tyler	Jacksonian	1827	Incumbent re-elected as a National Republican in 1833. National Republican gain.	▌ ✓ John Tyler (National Republican); [data missing]

=== Elections during the 23rd Congress ===
There were two late regular elections and three special elections, in which the winners were seated in 1833 after March 4. They are ordered here by election date.

State	Incumbent			Results	Candidates
State	Senator	Party	Electoral history	Results	Candidates
Georgia (Class 2)	George Troup	Jacksonian	1816 (special); 1816; 1818 (resigned); 1828	Incumbent resigned November 8, 1833. Successor elected November 21, 1833. Jacksonian hold.	▌ ✓ John Pendleton King (Jacksonian); [data missing]
Mississippi (Class 1)	Vacant			Legislature had failed to elect and the seat was vacant from March 4, 1833. Incumbent Jacksonian appointee was then elected as an Anti-Jacksonian late November 22, 1833. National Republican gain.	▌ ✓ John Black (National Republican); [data missing]
South Carolina (Class 3)	Stephen D. Miller	Nullifier	1830	Incumbent resigned March 2, 1833 due to ill health. Successor elected November 26, 1833. Nullifier hold.	▌ ✓ William C. Preston (Nullifier); [data missing]
Pennsylvania (Class 1)	Vacant			Legislature had previously failed to elect. Successor elected late December 7, 1833. Jacksonian gain.	▌ ✓ Samuel McKean (Jacksonian) 55.64%; ▌William Clark (Anti-Masonic) 21.05%; ▌Thomas H. Crawford (Jacksonian) 14.29%; ▌James Buchanan (Jacksonian) 3.76%; ▌Garrick Mallery (National Republican) 2.26%; ▌Adam King (Jacksonian) 0.75%; Not voting 2.26%
Louisiana (Class 3)	Josiah S. Johnston	National Republican	1824 (special); 1825; 1831	Incumbent died May 19, 1833. Successor elected December 13, 1833 on the second ballot. National Republican hold.	▌ ✓ Alexander Porter (National Republican) 32; ▌Joseph Marshall Walker (Jacksonian) 30

== Georgia (special) ==
Jacksonian George Troup resigned November 8, 1833 and Jacksonian John Pendleton King was elected November 21, 1833 to finish the term that would end March 3, 1835.

== Indiana ==
Class 1 Anti-Jacksonian senator James Noble died February 26, 1831, having served in office since statehood in 1816. Anti-Jacksonian Robert Hanna was appointed August 19, 1831 to serve until a special election, and Hanna did not run for the seat.

=== Indiana (special) ===
On January 3, 1832, Jacksonian John Tipton was elected to finish Noble's term, ending March 3, 1833.

=== Indiana (regular) ===
That same day, Jacksonian John Tipton was also elected to the next term, beginning March 4, 1833.

== Maryland ==
1833 United States Senate election in Maryland
- January 25, 1833

80 members of the Maryland General Assembly
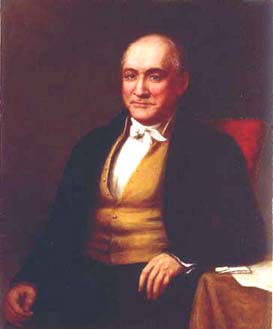

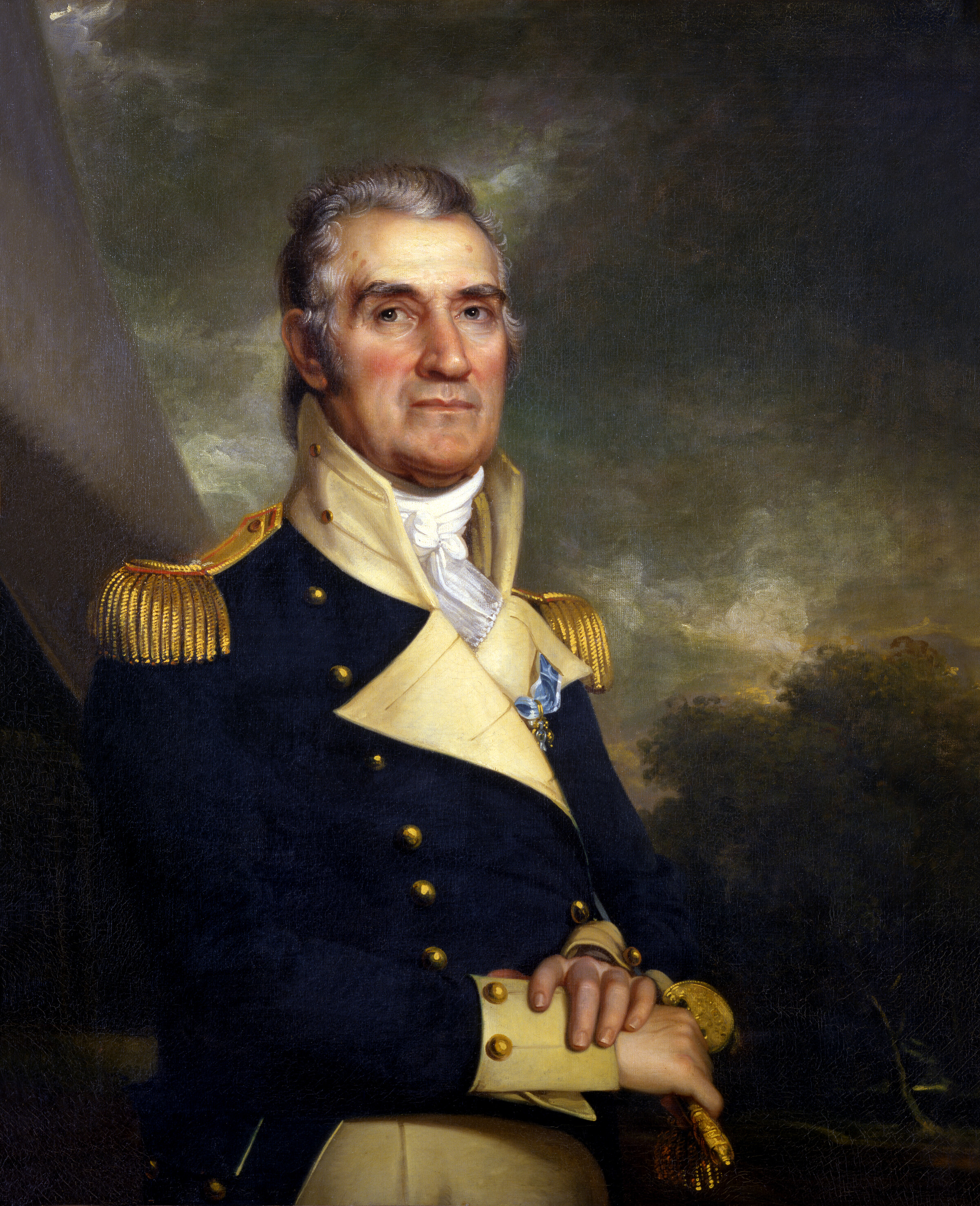
Candidate	Joseph Kent	Samuel Smith
Party	National Republican	Jacksonian democracy
Legislative vote	61	25
Percentage	70.93%	29.07

Joseph Kent won election over Samuel Smith by a margin of 41.86%, or 36 votes, for the Class 1 seat.

== Mississippi ==
Jacksonian senator Powhatan Ellis resigned July 16, 1832 to become a U.S. District Judge. The governor appointed Jacksonian John Black to finish the term. But when the term ended March 3, 1833, the legislature had failed to appoint a successor.

Black was eventually elected to the seat November 22, 1833, this time as an Anti-Jacksonian.

== New York ==
=== New York (special) ===
William L. Marcy had been elected in 1831 to the class 3 seat. In November 1832, Marcy was elected governor, and upon taking office resigned his Senate seat on January 1, 1833.

On January 4, 1833, Silas Wright Jr. was the choice of both the Assembly and the Senate and was declared elected.

1833 United States Senate special election result
Candidate	Party	Senate (32 members)	Assembly (128 members)
Silas Wright Jr.	Jacksonian	24	99
John C. Spencer	Anti-Mason	3	8
James Burt		1	2
Gerrit Smith		1	1
James Kent			4
Albert Gallatin			3
Gideon Hawley			3
John Birdsall	Anti-Mason		1
Myron Holley			1
William Thompson			1
Albert H. Tracy	Anti-Mason		1
Samuel A. Foot			1

=== New York (regular) ===
For the regular election, Nathaniel P. Tallmadge received majorities in both the Assembly and the Senate, and was declared elected. Due to the controversy about his eligibility, he received only very small majorities - one more than necessary in the Senate, and four more than necessary in the Assembly - although his party had large majorities in both houses of the Legislature.

1833 United States Senator election result
House	Jacksonian		Anti-Mason/National Republican		Jacksonian	
State Senate (32 members)	Nathaniel P. Tallmadge	18	Francis Granger	6	Benjamin F. Butler	2
State Assembly (128 members)	Nathaniel P. Tallmadge	69	Francis Granger	25	Benjamin F. Butler	12

== Pennsylvania ==
The election was held on eleven separate dates from December 1832 to December 1833. On December 7, 1833, Samuel McKean was elected by the Pennsylvania General Assembly to the United States Senate.

The Pennsylvania General Assembly, consisting of the House of Representatives and the Senate, convened on December 11, 1832, for the regularly scheduled Senate election for the term beginning on March 4, 1833. A total of thirty-six ballots were recorded. Ballots 1-17 were recorded on four separate dates (11th, 12th, 13th, 15th) in December 1832. Ballots 18-21 were recorded on two separate dates (9th and 10th) in January 1833. Ballots 22-29 were recorded on two separate dates (19th and 20th) in February 1833. The thirtieth ballot was recorded on March 12, 1833, followed by three additional ballots on April 2. Following the thirty-third ballot on April 2, the election convention adjourned sine die without electing a Senator.

Upon the expiration of incumbent George M. Dallas's term on March 4, 1833, the seat was vacated. It was vacant until the election convention of the General Assembly re-convened on December 7, 1833, and elected Jacksonian Samuel McKean to the seat after three additional ballots. The results of the third and final ballot (thirty-sixth ballot in total) of both houses combined during the December 7 session are as follows:

State Legislature results
Party	Candidate	Votes	%
Jacksonian	Samuel McKean	74	55.64
Anti-Masonic	William Clark	28	21.05%
Jacksonian	Thomas H. Crawford	19	14.29%
Jacksonian	James Buchanan	5	3.76%
Anti-Jacksonian	Garrick Mallery	3	2.26%
Jacksonian	Adam King	1	0.75%
N/A	Not voting	3	2.26%
Totals		133	100.00%

== South Carolina (special) ==
There were two special elections to the U.S. Senate in South Carolina during this cycle.

=== South Carolina (special, class 2) ===
The first election, on December 29, 1832, was to the class 2 seat held by Nullifier Robert Y. Hayne, who had resigned December 13, 1832 to become Governor of South Carolina. That election, for the term ending March 3, 1835, was won by Nullifier John C. Calhoun.

=== South Carolina (special, class 3) ===
The second election, on November 25, 1833, was to the Class 3 seat held by Nullifier Stephen D. Miller, who had resigned March 2, 1833. That election, for the term ending March 3, 1837, was won by Nullifier William C. Preston.

== Virginia ==
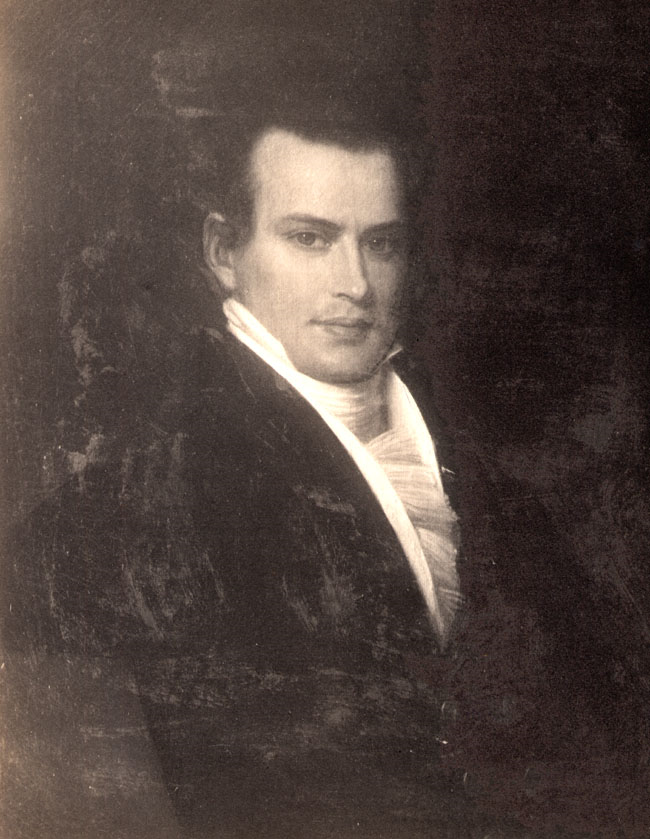
Senator William C. Rives

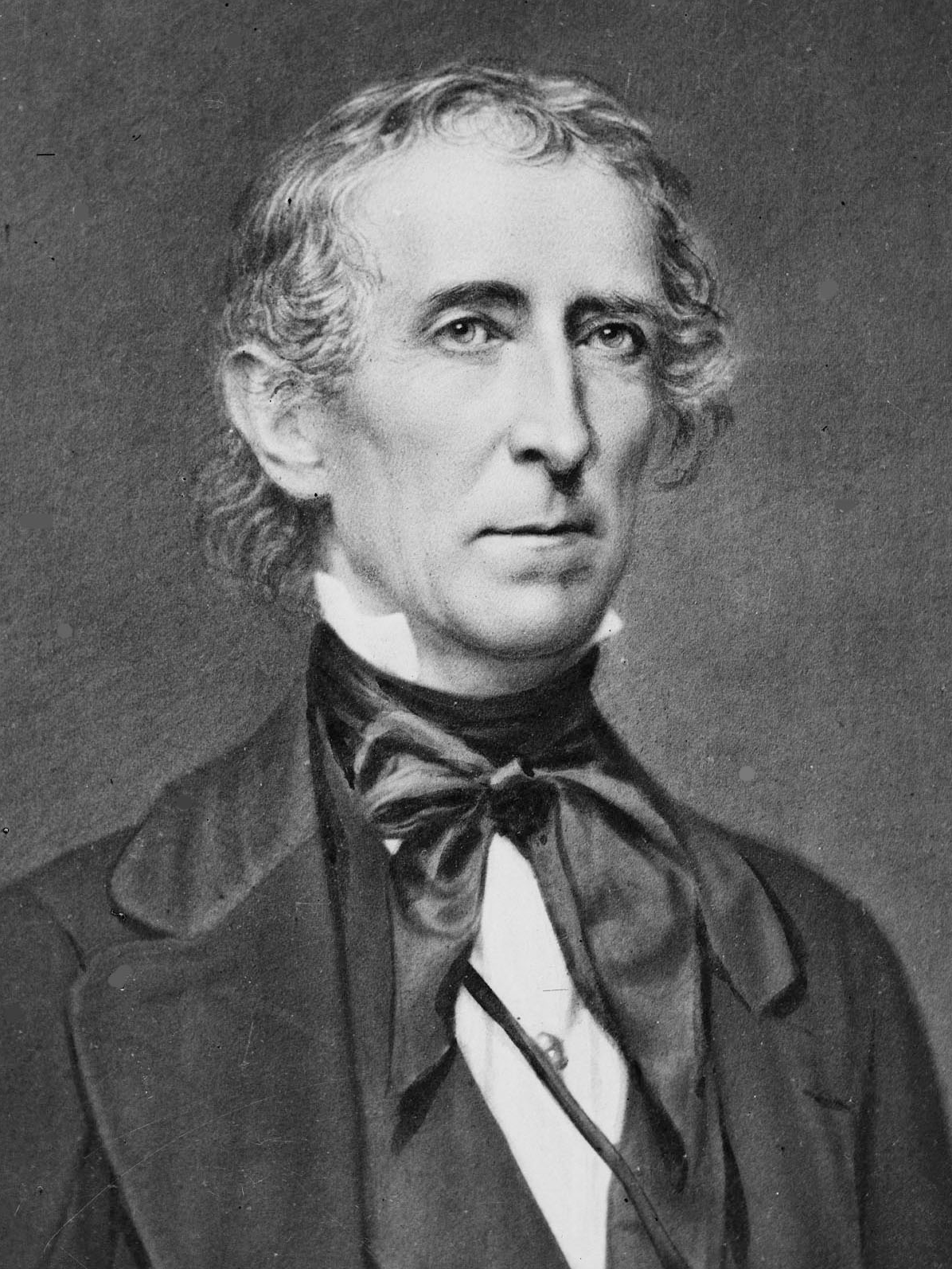
Senator John Tyler

=== Virginia (special) ===
Incumbent Jacksonian senator Littleton Tazewell resigned July 16, 1832 to become Governor of Virginia. On December 10, 1832, Jacksonian William C. Rives was elected to finish the Class 2 seat's term ending March 3, 1837. He would only serve, however, until his February 22, 1834 resignation.

=== Virginia (regular) ===
Incumbent senator (and future president), John Tyler was re-elected to the Class 1 seat in 1833, changing from Jacksonian to Anti-Jacksonian.

== See also ==
- 1832 United States elections
  - 1832 United States presidential election
  - 1832–33 United States House of Representatives elections
- 22nd United States Congress
- 23rd United States Congress
