= 1838–39 United States Senate elections =

- Dates vary by state
- Class 1

17 of the 52 seats in the United States Senate (plus special elections) 27 seats needed for a majority
	Majority party	Minority party
Party	Democratic	Whig
Last election	35 seats	17 seats
Seats before	35	17
Seats won	3	10
Seats after	28	20
Seat change	▼7	▲3
Seats up	10	7
- Results: Democratic hold Whig gain Whig hold Legislature failed to elect
Majority Party before election
Democratic
Elected Majority Party
Democratic

The 1838–39 United States Senate elections were held on various dates in various states. As these U.S. Senate elections were prior to the ratification of the Seventeenth Amendment in 1913, senators were chosen by state legislatures. Senators were elected over a wide range of time throughout 1838 and 1839, and a seat may have been filled months late or remained vacant due to legislative deadlock. In these elections, terms were up for the senators in Class 1.

The Democratic Party lost seven seats, but still retained a majority.

== Results summary ==
Senate party division, 26th Congress (1839–1841)

- Majority party: Democratic (28–29)
- Minority party: Whig (19–23)
- Total seats: 52

== Change in composition ==
=== Before the elections ===
After the January 4, 1838 special election in Maryland.

				D_{1}	D_{2}	D_{3}	D_{4}	D_{5}	D_{6}
D_{16}	D_{15}	D_{14}	D_{13}	D_{12}	D_{11}	D_{10}	D_{9}	D_{8}	D_{7}
D_{17}	D_{18}	D_{19}	D_{20}	D_{21}	D_{22}	D_{23}	D_{24}	D_{25}	D_{26} Maine; Ran
Majority →									D_{27} N.Y. Ran in different party
W_{17} Vt. Retired	D_{35} Conn. Retired	D_{34} Ind. Retired	D_{33} Ohio; Retired	D_{32} Va. Retired	D_{31} Pa. Unknown	D_{30} Miss. Unknown	D_{29} Mich. Unknown	D_{28} Mo. Ran	D_{27} N.Y. Ran in different party
W_{16} R.I. Unknown	W_{15} Tenn. (reg); Ran	W_{14} N.J. Ran	W_{13} Mass. Ran	W_{12} Md. Ran	W_{11} Del. Ran	W_{10}	W_{9}	W_{8}	W_{7}
				W_{1}	W_{2}	W_{3}	W_{4}	W_{5}	W_{6}

=== Result of the elections ===
				D_{1}	D_{2}	D_{3}	D_{4}	D_{5}	D_{6}
D_{16}	D_{15}	D_{14}	D_{13}	D_{12}	D_{11}	D_{10}	D_{9}	D_{8}	D_{7}
D_{17}	D_{18}	D_{19}	D_{20}	D_{21}	D_{22}	D_{23}	D_{24}	D_{25}	D_{26} Maine; Re-elected
Majority →									D_{27} Mo. Re-elected
W_{17} Vt. Hold	W_{18} Conn. Gain	W_{19} Ind. Gain	W_{20} Miss. Gain	V_{4} Va. D Loss	V_{3} Pa. D Loss	V_{2} N.Y. D Loss	V_{1} Mich. D Loss	D_{28} Ohio; Hold	D_{27} Mo. Re-elected
W_{16} R.I. Hold	W_{15} Tenn. (reg); Re-elected	W_{14} N.J. Re-elected	W_{13} Mass. Re-elected	W_{12} Md. Re-elected	W_{11} Del. Re-elected	W_{10}	W_{9}	W_{8}	W_{7}
				W_{1}	W_{2}	W_{3}	W_{4}	W_{5}	W_{6}

=== Beginning of the next term ===
				D_{1}	D_{2}	D_{3}	D_{4}	D_{5}	D_{6}
D_{16}	D_{15}	D_{14}	D_{13}	D_{12}	D_{11}	D_{10}	D_{9}	D_{8}	D_{7}
D_{17}	D_{18}	D_{19}	D_{20}	D_{21}	D_{22}	D_{23}	D_{24}	D_{25}	D_{26}
Majority →									D_{27}
W_{17}	W_{18}	W_{19}	V_{5} Tenn. (reg); W Declined	V_{4}	V_{3}	V_{2}	V_{1}	D_{28}	D_{27}
W_{16}	W_{15}	W_{14}	W_{13}	W_{12}	W_{11}	W_{10}	W_{9}	W_{8}	W_{7}
				W_{1}	W_{2}	W_{3}	W_{4}	W_{5}	W_{6}

Key:

D_{#}	Democratic
W_{#}	Whig
V_{#}	Vacant

== Race summaries ==
=== Special elections during the 25th Congress ===
In these special elections, the winners were seated during 1838 or before March 4, 1839; ordered by election date.

State	Incumbent			Results	Candidates
State	Senator	Party	Electoral history	Results	Candidates
Maryland (Class 1)	Joseph Kent	Whig	1833	Incumbent died November 24, 1837. New senator elected January 4, 1838. Whig hold. Winner was also elected to the next term, see below.	▌ ✓ William Duhurst Merrick (Whig); [data missing]
Mississippi (Class 1)	Thomas H. Williams	Democratic	1838 (appointed)	Interim appointee elected January 30, 1839. Winner was not elected to the next term; see below.	▌ ✓ Thomas H. Williams (Democratic); [data missing]

=== Races leading to the 26th Congress ===
In these regular elections, the winners were elected for the term beginning March 4, 1839; ordered by state.

All of the elections involved the Class 1 seats.

State	Incumbent			Results	Candidates
State	Senator	Party	Electoral history	Results	Candidates
Connecticut	John Niles	Democratic	1835 (special)	Incumbent retired. Winner elected in 1838 or 1839. Whig gain.	▌ ✓ Thaddeus Betts (Whig); [data missing]
Delaware	Richard H. Bayard	Whig	1836 (special)	Incumbent re-elected in 1838 or 1839.	▌ ✓ Richard H. Bayard (Whig); [data missing]
Indiana	John Tipton	Democratic	1832 (special); 1832	Incumbent retired. Winner elected in 1838. Whig gain.	▌ ✓ Albert White (Whig); [data missing]
Maine	Reuel Williams	Democratic	1837 (special)	Incumbent re-elected January 17, 1839.	▌ ✓ Reuel Williams (Democratic) 125; ▌George Evans (Whig) 71; ▌John S. Tenney (Unknown) 6; ▌Ezekiel Whitman (Unknown) 3; ▌John Holmes (Whig) 1
Maryland	William Merrick	Whig	1838 (special)	Incumbent re-elected in 1839.	▌ ✓ William Merrick (Whig); [data missing]
Massachusetts	Daniel Webster	Whig	1827 (special); 1833	Incumbent re-elected in 1839.	▌ ✓ Daniel Webster (Whig); [data missing]
Michigan	Lucius Lyon	Democratic	1835	Incumbent retired. Legislature failed to elect until 1840. Democratic loss.	[data missing]
Mississippi	Thomas H. Williams	Democratic	1838 (appointed); 1839 (special)	Incumbent retired or lost re-election. Winner elected in 1838. Whig gain.	▌ ✓ John Henderson (Whig); [data missing]
Missouri	Thomas H. Benton	Democratic	1821; 1827; 1833	Incumbent re-elected in 1839.	▌ ✓ Thomas H. Benton (Democratic); [data missing]
New Jersey	Samuel L. Southard	Whig	1821 (appointed); 1820; 1823 (resigned); 1833	Incumbent re-elected in 1838.	▌ ✓ Samuel L. Southard (Whig) 36; ▌Mahlon Dickerson (Democrat) 24
New York	Nathaniel P. Tallmadge	Democratic	1833	Incumbent ran for re-election as a Whig. Legislature failed to elect. Democratic loss.	▌Nathaniel P. Tallmadge (Whig); ▌Samuel Nelson (Democratic); ▌Samuel Beardsley (Democratic); Others
Ohio	Thomas Morris	Democratic	1833	Incumbent retired. Winner elected in 1838. Democratic hold.	▌ ✓ Benjamin Tappan (Democratic); [data missing]
Pennsylvania	Samuel McKean	Democratic	1833	Incumbent retired or lost re-election. Legislature failed to elect until 1840 after the December 1838 election was postponed due to the Buckshot War. Democratic loss.	None.
Rhode Island	Asher Robbins	Whig	1835 (special); 1827; 1833	Incumbent retired or lost re-election. Winner elected November 3, 1838. Whig hold.	▌ ✓ Nathan F. Dixon (Whig) 54 votes; ▌Benjamin Babock Thurston (Democratic) 26 votes; ▌Albert C. Greene (Whig) 1 vote; ▌Dutee Jerauld Pearce (Democratic) 1 vote
Tennessee	Felix Grundy	Democratic	1829 (special); 1833	Incumbent resigned July 4, 1838 to become U.S. Attorney General. A new senator had already been elected October 21, 1837. Whig gain. Winner was then appointed to finish the unexpired term but declined to serve the next term (see below).	▌ ✓ Ephraim H. Foster (Whig) 65; ▌William Carroll (Democratic) 33
Vermont	Benjamin Swift	Whig	1833	Incumbent retired. Winner elected in 1839. Whig hold.	▌ ✓ Samuel S. Phelps (Whig); [data missing]
Virginia	William C. Rives	Democratic	1832 (special); 1834 (resigned); 1836 (special)	Incumbent retired or lost re-election. Legislature failed to elect until 1841. Democratic loss.	[data missing]

=== Special election during the 26th Congress ===
In this special election, the winner was seated in 1839 after March 4.

State	Incumbent			Results	Candidates
State	Senator	Party	Electoral history	Results	Candidates
Tennessee (Class 1)	Vacant			Appointed incumbent Ephraim H. Foster had been elected to the next term (see above), but declined to serve the next term and left office at the end of the term. New senator elected November 19, 1839. Democratic gain.	▌ ✓ Felix Grundy (Democratic) 56; ▌Ephraim H. Foster (Whig) 44

== Maryland ==
=== Maryland (special) ===
1838 United States Senate special election in Maryland
- December 1837

80 members of the Maryland General Assembly
Candidate	William Duhurst Merrick
Party	Whig
Legislative vote	-
Percentage	-%

William Duhurst Merrick won election over to fill the seat vacated by Joseph Kent by an unknown margin of votes, for the Class 1 seat.

=== Maryland (regular) ===
1839 United States Senate election in Maryland
- February 1839

80 members of the Maryland General Assembly
Candidate	William Duhurst Merrick
Party	Whig
Legislative vote	-
Percentage	-%

William Duhurst Merrick won election to a full term by an unknown margin of votes, for the Class 1 seat.

== New York ==
The New York election was held February 5, 1839 by the New York State Legislature. Nathaniel P. Tallmadge had been elected as a Jacksonian Democratic in 1833 to this seat, and his term would expire on March 3, 1839.

On February 4, 1839, the State Legislature elected on joint ballot Spencer, Cooke, Hall and Haight to the offices they were nominated for, but on the next day they could not agree on a U.S. Senator.

The Assembly nominated Nathaniel P. Tallmadge "by the votes of all the Whig members." (see Hammond, page 512)

Although the Democratic State Senate majority did not object to be outvoted on joint ballot for the election of Whigs to State offices, they rejected the idea of electing a renegade Democratic to the U.S. Senate, and took refuge to the only means to defeat Tallmadge: They did not nominate anybody, following the precedents of 1819–1820 and 1825–1826, so that a joint ballot could not be held. On the first ballot, Tallmadge received 13 votes out of 31 cast, all Whigs. (Note: Whig John Maynard did not vote on the first five ballots.) The Democratic vote was scattered among many men, nobody receiving more than 2. Four more ballots were held with a similar result. (Note: The on-line copy of the Senate journal omits the pages with the second and third ballot.) On the sixth ballot, all Whigs and two Democrats voted for Samuel Beardsley, who received 16 votes, one short of the necessary number for a nomination. The Democrats then abandoned further balloting, fearing that the Whigs would vote for anybody who received by chance three Democratic votes, just to force any nomination, thus enabling the Legislature to proceed to the joint ballot.

Candidate	Party	New York Senate (32 members)						Assembly (128 members)
Candidate	Party	First ballot	Second ballot	Third ballot	Fourth ballot	Fifth ballot	Sixth ballot	First ballot
Nathaniel P. Tallmadge	Whig	13			13	13		✓ 82
Samuel Nelson	Democratic	2						
Samuel Beardsley	Democratic	1			2	2	16	
William C. Bouck	Democratic	1			1	1	1	
Churchill C. Cambreleng	Democratic	1			1	1	1	
Hiram Denio	Democratic	1			1	1	1	
John A. Dix	Democratic	1			1	1	1	
Charles E. Dudley	Democratic	1			1	1	1	
Azariah C. Flagg	Democratic	1			1	1	1	
Freeborn G. Jewett	Democratic	1			1	1	1	
Ebenezer Mack	Democratic	1			1	1	1	
Charles McVean	Democratic	1			1	1	1	
Joseph D. Monell	Democratic	1			1	1	1	
John Savage	Democratic	1			1	1	1	
Jacob Sutherland	Democratic	1			1	1	1	
John Tracy	Democratic	1			1	1	1	
Greene C. Bronson	Democratic	1						
Reuben H. Walworth	Democratic	1						
Levi Beardsley	Democratic				1	1	1	
Benjamin F. Butler	Democratic				1	1	1	
Abijah Mann Jr.	Democratic				1	1	1	

No further action was taken by this Legislature, and the seat became vacant on March 4, 1839. Tallmadge would later be elected in 1840.

== Tennessee ==
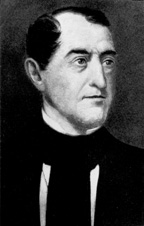
Senator Ephraim H. Foster

There were two elections to the same seat due to the July 4, 1838 resignation of Democrat Felix Grundy to become U.S. Attorney General. Whig Ephraim H. Foster was appointed September 17, 1838, to finish Grundy's term.

=== Tennessee (regular) ===
Foster, who had already been elected to the next term, declined the seat, refusing to take the Tennessee General Assembly's instructions on how to vote, so he left office March 3, 1839, and the seat was vacant when the term began.

=== Tennessee (special) ===
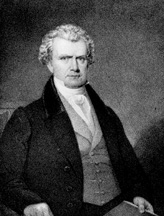
Senator Felix Grundy

The legislature then elected Grundy back to the seat November 19, 1839, but he died a year later.

== See also ==
- 1838 United States elections
  - 1838–39 United States House of Representatives elections
- 25th United States Congress
- 26th United States Congress

== Sources ==
- Party Division in the Senate, 1789–Present, via Senate.gov
