= Isaac S. Tallmadge =

19th century American politician

District Attorney of Fond du Lac County, Wisconsin
- In office January 1, 1856 – January 1, 1858
- Preceded by: Edward S. Bragg
- Succeeded by: Albert W. Paine
- In office January 1, 1850 – January 1, 1852
- Preceded by: S. S. N. Fuller
- Succeeded by: William H. Ebbets

Member of the Wisconsin State Assembly from the Fond du Lac 3rd district
- In office January 3, 1853 – January 2, 1855
- Preceded by: Position Established
- Succeeded by: William H. Ebbets

Personal details
- Born: Isaac Smith Tallmadge; May 31, 1824 New York, U.S.
- Died: May 27, 1882 (aged 57) Bellevue Hospital, New York, New York, U.S.
- Cause of death: Abscess
- Party: Democratic
- Spouse: Cornelia Ruggles (m. 1847–1882)
- Children: William Davis Tallmadge^{(b. 1849; died young)}; Harriet Smith (Butler)^{(b. 1851; died 1925)}; Minnie Beall (Eycleshimer)^{(b. 1852; died 1937)}; Alfred Ruggles Tallmadge^{(b. 1854; died 1932)}; Eliza Collins Tallmadge^{(b. 1858; died 1885)}; Charlotte W. Tallmadge^{(b. 1861; died 1863)}; Anna Tallmadge^{(b. 1866)}
- Parents: Nathaniel P. Tallmadge (father); Abby Lewis (Smith) Tallmadge (mother)
- Relatives: James Tallmadge Jr.^{(1st cousin, once removed)}; Matthias B. Tallmadge^{(1st cousin, once removed)}; Charles Ruggles Boardman^{(nephew)}; John J. Tallmadge^{(2nd cousin)}
- Profession: lawyer

Isaac Smith Tallmadge (May 31, 1824 – May 27, 1882) was an American lawyer, Democratic politician, and Wisconsin pioneer. He was a member of the Wisconsin State Assembly, representing central Fond du Lac County during the 1853 and 1854 terms. He also served two terms as district attorney of Fond du Lac County.

He was the eldest son of Nathaniel P. Tallmadge, who served as United States senator from New York and the 3rd governor of the Wisconsin Territory. They were members of the Tallmadge (or Talmadge) family of New England, which had many notable members in American political and cultural history.

== Biography ==
Isaac Tallmadge was born on May 31, 1824, in New York. He graduated from Union College in 1842. In 1849 and 1855, he was elected district attorney of Fond du Lac County, Wisconsin, and in 1853 he served in the Wisconsin State Assembly, representing Fond du Lac County. In 1859 he was the Democratic candidate for Wisconsin circuit court in the 4th circuit, but was defeated by David Taylor.

Sometime after 1859, he moved to New York City and practiced law.

Tallmadge was run over by a horse-drawn cart in 1881 and developed a severe abscess on his back. He died from complications related to that abscess on May 27, 1882, at New York's Bellevue Hospital.

== Personal life and family ==
Isaac Smith Tallmadge was the eldest of nine children born to Nathaniel P. Tallmadge (1795–1864) and his first wife, Abigail Lewis (née Smith; 1804–1857). Nathaniel Tallmadge served two terms as United States senator from New York, and was then appointed the 3rd governor of the Wisconsin Territory. He was also one of the first significant landowners in what is now Fond du Lac County, Wisconsin, and his former estate is the site of Rienzi Cemetery. The Tallmadge family were descendants of the Thomas Talmadge, who emigrated from England to the Massachusetts Bay Colony in 1631.

Isaac Tallmadge married Cornelia Ruggles in December 1847. They had seven children together, but at least two died in infancy. They were married for 35 years before his death in 1882.

Wisconsin State Assembly
District created	Member of the Wisconsin State Assembly from the Fond du Lac 3rd district January 3, 1853 – January 2, 1855	Succeeded by William H. Ebbets
Legal offices
Preceded by S. S. N. Fuller	District Attorney of Fond du Lac County, Wisconsin; January 1, 1850 – January 1, 1852	Succeeded by William H. Ebbets
Preceded by Edward S. Bragg	District Attorney of Fond du Lac County, Wisconsin; January 1, 1856 – January 1, 1858	Succeeded by Albert W. Paine
