= 1838 United States elections =

- ← 1836 1837 1838 1839 1840 → Midterm elections
- Incumbent president: ▌Martin Van Buren (D)
- Next Congress: 26th

Senate elections
- Overall control: Democratic hold
- Seats contested: 17 of 52 seats
- Net seat change: Whig +3

House elections
- Overall control: Democratic hold
- Seats contested: All 242 voting seats
- Net seat change: Whig +16

Elections occurred in the middle of Democratic President Martin Van Buren's term, during the Second Party System. Members of the 26th United States Congress were chosen in this election.

Whigs picked up a moderate number of seats in both the House and Senate, but the Democratic Party retained a majority in both chambers. However, due to a split in the Democratic party, Whig Congressman Robert M. T. Hunter was elected to be the Speaker of the House.

== See also ==
- 1838–39 United States House of Representatives elections
- 1838–39 United States Senate elections
