= Governor Talmadge =

Governor Talmadge may refer to:

- Eugene Talmadge (1884–1946), 67th Governor of Georgia
- Herman Talmadge (1913–2002), 71st Governor of Georgia

== See also ==
- Nathaniel P. Tallmadge (1795–1864), 3rd Governor of Wisconsin Territory
