= 1832 United States elections =

- ← 1830 1831 1832 1833 1834 → Presidential election year
- Incumbent president: ▌Andrew Jackson (D)
- Next Congress: 23rd

Presidential election
- Partisan control: Democratic hold
- Popular vote margin: Democratic +16.8%
- Electoral vote
- Andrew Jackson (D): 219
- Henry Clay (NR): 49
- Others: 18
- 1832 presidential election results. Blue denotes states won by Jackson, light yellow denotes state won by Clay, teal denotes states won by Floyd, and orange denotes states won by Wirt. Numbers indicate the number of electoral votes allotted to each state.

Senate elections
- Overall control: Anti-Jacksonian gain
- Seats contested: 18 of 52 seats
- Net seat change: Anti-Jacksonian +1

House elections
- Overall control: Democratic hold
- Seats contested: All 240 voting members
- Net seat change: Democratic +17

Elections for the 23rd United States Congress, were held in 1832 and 1833. Taking place during the Second Party System and a political conflict over the re-authorization of the Second Bank of the United States, the elections were contested between Andrew Jackson's Democratic Party and opponents of Jackson, including the National Republicans. Though the Democrats retained the presidency and the House, they lost their Senate majority. The Anti-Masonic Party also fielded the first notable presidential candidacy from a third party.

In the presidential election, the Democratic President Andrew Jackson easily defeated the National Republican Senator Henry Clay from Kentucky. The Anti-Masonic candidate William Wirt received 7% of the popular vote, the strongest popular vote showing by a third party up to that point, while the Nullifier John Floyd was the first third-party candidate to win electoral votes. Jackson was the last president to win a second term until Abraham Lincoln won a second term in 1864. The first presidential nominating conventions took place during this election. Also, for the first time, every state except South Carolina chose its presidential electors via statewide popular vote.

Following the 1830 census, the House increased in size, adding 27 seats. Opponents of Jackson maintained the same number of seats, but the Democrats won several seats, increasing their majority.

In the Senate, the anti-Jackson faction won moderate gains, taking the majority in the Senate.

== See also ==
- 1832 United States presidential election
- 1832–33 United States House of Representatives elections
- 1832–33 United States Senate elections
