= 1836 United States elections =

- ← 1834 1835 1836 1837 1838 → Presidential election year
- Incumbent president: ▌Andrew Jackson (D)
- Next Congress: 25th

Presidential election
- Partisan control: Democratic hold
- Popular vote margin: Democratic +14.2%
- Electoral vote
- Martin Van Buren (D): 170
- William Henry Harrison (W): 73
- Hugh Lawson White (W): 26
- Others: 25
- 1836 presidential election results. Blue denotes states won by Van Buren, Buff denotes states won by Harrison, purple denotes states won by White, coral pink denotes states won by Webster, and bluegrass green denotes states won by Mangum. Numbers indicate the number of electoral votes allotted to each state.

Senate elections
- Overall control: Democratic hold
- Seats contested: 17 of 52 seats
- Net seat change: Democratic +3

House elections
- Overall control: Democratic hold
- Seats contested: All 242 voting members
- Net seat change: Whig +25

Elections for the 25th United States Congress, were held in 1836 and 1837. The election saw the emergence of the Whig Party, which succeeded the National Republican Party in the Second Party System as the primary opposition to the Democratic Party. The Whigs chose their name in symbolic defiance to the leader of the Democratic Party, "King" Andrew Jackson, and supported a national bank and the American System. Despite the emergence of the Whigs as a durable political party, Democrats retained the presidency and a majority in both houses of Congress.

In the presidential election, the Whigs ran multiple candidates designed to deny the Democratic candidate a majority of the electoral vote, and carried a scattering of states in the South, the West, and the Northeast. However, the Democratic Vice President Martin Van Buren still took a majority of the popular and electoral vote, defeating the Whig candidates William Henry Harrison of Ohio, Hugh Lawson White of Tennessee, Daniel Webster of Massachusetts, and Willie Person Mangum of North Carolina. Virginia's electors refused to vote for Richard Mentor Johnson, Van Buren's running mate, leaving Johnson short of a majority of electoral votes for vice president. The Senate elected Johnson in a contingent election, the only time the Senate has ever chosen the vice president. Van Buren was the last sitting vice president to win election as president until George H. W. Bush's election in 1988; this is also the most recent election in which a Democrat was elected to the U.S. presidency in succession to another Democrat, who had served two terms as U.S. president.

In the House, Whigs won moderate gains, but Democrats retained a solid majority in the chamber.

In the Senate, Democrats gained many seats, boosting their majority.

== See also ==
- 1836 United States presidential election
- 1836–37 United States House of Representatives elections
- 1836–37 United States Senate elections
