= List of elections in 1839 =

The following elections occurred in the year 1839.

== Europe ==
- 1839 Belgian general election
- 1839 French legislative election
- 1839 Hungarian parliamentary election
- 1839 Spanish general election

== North America ==
=== United States ===
- 1839 Massachusetts gubernatorial election

==== United States Senate ====
- 1838 and 1839 United States Senate elections
- United States Senate election in Massachusetts, 1839
- United States Senate election in New York, 1839/1840

==== United States House of Representatives ====
- 1838 and 1839 United States House of Representatives elections

==== United States lieutenant gubernatorial ====
- 1839 Connecticut lieutenant gubernatorial election

==== United States gubernatorial ====
- 1839 Alabama gubernatorial election
- 1839 Connecticut gubernatorial election
- 1839 Georgia gubernatorial election
- 1839 Maine gubernatorial election
- 1839 Massachusetts gubernatorial election
- 1839 Michigan gubernatorial election
- 1839 Mississippi gubernatorial election
- 1839 New Hampshire gubernatorial election
- 1839 New Jersey gubernatorial election
- 1839 Rhode Island gubernatorial election
- 1839 Tennessee gubernatorial election
- 1839 Vermont gubernatorial election

==== United States mayoral elections ====
- 1839 Chicago mayoral election
- 1839 Philadelphia mayoral election

== See also ==
- Category:1839 elections
