= 1834 United States elections =

- ← 1832 1833 1834 1835 1836 → Midterm elections
- Incumbent president: ▌Andrew Jackson (D)
- Next Congress: 24th

Senate elections
- Overall control: Anti-Jacksonian hold
- Seats contested: 16 of 48 seats
- Net seat change: Democratic +2

House elections
- Overall control: Democratic hold
- Seats contested: All 242 voting seats
- Net seat change: Anti-Jacksonian +12

Elections occurred in the middle of the Democratic President Andrew Jackson's second term. Members of the 24th United States Congress were chosen in this election. Taking place during the Second Party System, elections were contested between Andrew Jackson's Democratic Party and opponents of Jackson, including the remnants of the National Republican Party (Anti-Jacksonian Party). During this election, the anti-Jacksonian faction began to transition into the Whig Party. Arkansas and Michigan joined the union during the 24th Congress.

In the House, the anti-Jacksonian faction picked up some seats from the Anti-Masonic Party, but the Democrats retained a commanding majority.

In the Senate, the Democrats picked up a moderate number of seats, but the Anti-Jacksonian faction maintained narrow control of the chamber. However, the Democrats later won control of the chamber during the next Congress.

== See also ==
- 1834–35 United States House of Representatives elections
- 1834–35 United States Senate elections
