= 1839–1840 United States Senate election in New York =

- February 5, 1839; January 14, 1840

Majority approval in both houses needed to win
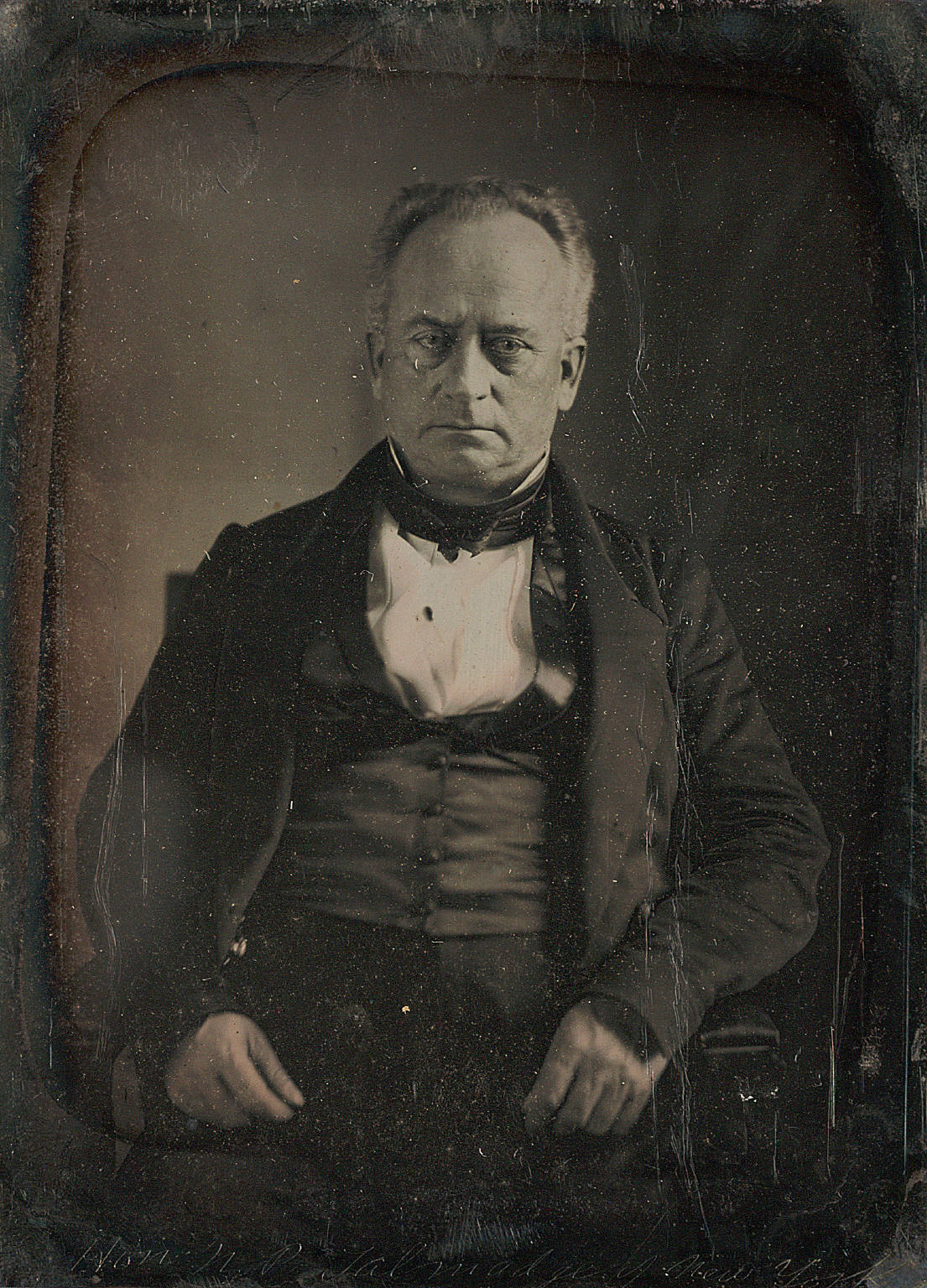
Candidate	Nathaniel P. Tallmadge
Party	Whig
Senate	19
Senate %	59.4%
U.S. senator before election
Nathaniel P. Tallmadge
Democratic
Elected U.S. Senator
Philip Schuyler
Whig

The 1839—1840 United States Senate election in New York was held on February 5, 1839, and January 14, 1840. Incumbent Senator Nathaniel P. Tallmadge was re-elected to a second term in office over scattered opposition.

Though his first election was as a Jacksonian Democrat, Tallmadge left the Democrats in 1838 to join a "Conservative" faction in support of the new Whig Party ticket led by William Seward. The originally scheduled 1839 election for Tallmadge's seat ended without a conclusion because the Democratic-controlled Senate refused to nominate an opponent. After Whigs took the Senate in the 1839 election, Tallmadge was finally elected to the term expiring in 1845.

== Background ==
=== Tallmadge party switch ===
Nathaniel P. Tallmadge had been elected as a Jacksonian Democrat in 1833 to this seat, and his term would expire on March 3, 1839.

In 1838, the Whigs nominated William H. Seward for Governor, the Democrats re-nominated Governor Marcy. A faction of former Democrats met on October 3 at Syracuse, New York under the name of "Conservatives," among them U.S. Senator Nathaniel P. Tallmadge, and endorsed the Whig candidates Seward and Bradish. Seward was elected Governor

=== Legislative composition ===
After the Panic of 1837, the new Whig Party managed to wrest the power from the Democratic Party. At the state election in November 1837, 101 Whigs and 27 Democrats were elected to the assembly, and 6 Whigs and 2 Democrats were elected to the state senate.

At the 1838 state election, 82 Whigs and 46 Democrats were elected to the assembly, and 5 Whigs and 3 Democrats to the state senate. This added up to 18 Democrats and 14 Whigs in the senate. The 62nd New York State Legislature met from January 1 to May 7, 1839, at Albany, New York.

== Candidates ==
The Whig state legislators met in caucus on January 31, 1839, to nominate candidates for state offices. The terms of Secretary of State John Adams Dix, State Comptroller Azariah C. Flagg, Attorney General Samuel Beardsley and State Treasurer Gamaliel H. Barstow would expire early in February, and the term of Nathaniel P. Tallmadge in the U.S. Senate early in March. Dix, Flagg and Beardsley were Democrats, and John C. Spencer, Bates Cooke and Willis Hall were nominated to succeed them. Dr. Barstow was a Whig but declined to continue in office, and Jacob Haight was nominated for treasurer. Tallmadge, a former Democrat, was now a member of the Conservative faction, and having endorsed the Whig ticket at the last state election, had considerable support but also met some rejection. He was nominated by a "strong vote." (see Hammond, page 511).

== 1839 election ==
On February 4, 1839, the state legislature elected on joint ballot Spencer, Cooke, Hall and Haight to the offices they were nominated for, but on the next day they could not agree on a U.S. Senator.

The Assembly nominated Nathaniel P. Tallmadge "by the votes of all the Whig members." (see Hammond, page 512)

Although the Democratic State Senate majority did not object to be outvoted on joint ballot for the election of Whigs to State offices, they rejected the idea of electing a renegade Democrat to the U.S. Senate, and took refuge to the only means to defeat Tallmadge: They did not nominate anybody, following the precedents of 1819–1820 and 1825–1826, so that a joint ballot could not be held. On the first ballot, Tallmadge received 13 votes out of 31 cast, all Whigs. The Democratic vote was scattered among many men, nobody receiving more than 2. Four more ballots were held with a similar result. On the sixth ballot, all Whigs and two Democrats voted for Samuel Beardsley, who received 16 votes, one short of the necessary number for a nomination. The Democrats then abandoned further balloting, fearing that the Whigs would vote for anybody who received by chance three Democratic votes, just to force any nomination, thus enabling the legislature to proceed to the joint ballot.

1839 United States Senator election result
Office	Candidate	Party	Senate (32 members) (first ballot)	Senate (32 members) (second ballot)	Senate (32 members) (third ballot)	Senate (32 members) (fourth ballot)	Senate (32 members) (fifth ballot)	Senate (32 members) (sixth ballot)	Assembly (128 members)
U.S. Senator	Nathaniel P. Tallmadge	Whig	13			13	13		82
	Samuel Nelson	Democrat	2						
	Samuel Beardsley	Democrat	1			2	2	16	
	William C. Bouck	Democrat	1			1	1	1	
	Churchill C. Cambreleng	Democrat	1			1	1	1	
	Hiram Denio	Democrat	1			1	1	1	
	John A. Dix	Democrat	1			1	1	1	
	Charles E. Dudley	Democrat	1			1	1	1	
	Azariah C. Flagg	Democrat	1			1	1	1	
	Freeborn G. Jewett	Democrat	1			1	1	1	
	Ebenezer Mack	Democrat	1			1	1	1	
	Charles McVean	Democrat	1			1	1	1	
	Joseph D. Monell	Democrat	1			1	1	1	
	John Savage	Democrat	1			1	1	1	
	Jacob Sutherland	Democrat	1			1	1	1	
	John Tracy	Democrat	1			1	1	1	
	Greene C. Bronson	Democrat	1						
	Reuben H. Walworth	Democrat	1						
	Levi Beardsley	Democrat				1	1	1	
	Benjamin F. Butler	Democrat				1	1	1	
	Abijah Mann Jr.	Democrat				1	1	1	

No further action was taken by this Legislature, and the seat became vacant on March 4, 1839.

== 1839 state legislature election ==
At the state election in November 1839, 7 Whigs and 3 Democrats were elected to the state Senate, which gave the Whigs a majority, the first anti-Bucktails/Jacksonian/Democratic majority in 20 years. The 63rd New York State Legislature met from January 7 to May 14, 1840, at Albany, New York. The strength of the parties in the Assembly, as shown by the vote for Speaker, was: 68 for Whig George Washington Patterson and 56 for Democrat Levi S. Chatfield.

== 1840 election ==
Nathaniel P. Tallmadge received a majority in both the Assembly and the Senate, and was declared elected.

1840 United States Senator election result
Office	Candidate	Party	Senate (32 members)	Assembly (128 members)
U.S. Senator	Nathaniel P. Tallmadge	Whig	19	
	Samuel Beardsley	Democrat	2	
	Levi Beardsley	Democrat	1	
	William C. Bouck	Democrat	1	
	Benjamin F. Butler	Democrat	1	
	Churchill C. Cambreleng	Democrat	1	
	Hiram Denio	Democrat	1	
	John A. Dix	Democrat	1	
	Azariah C. Flagg	Democrat	1	
	John Savage	Democrat	1	
	John Tracy	Democrat	1	

== Aftermath ==
Tallmadge re-took his seat on January 27, 1840, and remained in office until June 17, 1844, when he resigned to be appointed Governor of Wisconsin Territory. Daniel S. Dickinson was appointed to fill the vacancy temporarily, and subsequently elected by the state legislature to succeed Tallmadge.

== Sources ==
- The New York Civil List compiled in 1858 (see: pg. 63 for U.S. Senators; pg. 132 for state senators 1839 and 1840; pg. 221f for Members of Assembly 1839; pg. 223f for Members of Assembly 1840;)
- Members of the 26th United States Congress (omits date on which Tallmadge took his seat)
- Members of the 28th United States Congress
- History of Political Parties in the State of New-York, Vol. II by Jabez Delano Hammond (State election, 1839: pg. 486; U.S. Senate election 1839: pg. 512; State election, 1839: page 517; Speaker election, 1840: pg. 519; U.S. Senate election 1840: pg. 523)
- The Tribune Almanac and Political Register for 1838 published by the New York Tribune, edited by Horace Greeley (State election result 1837: page 10)
- Journal of the Senate (62nd Session) (1839; pg. 107–113)
- Journal of the Senate (63rd Session) (1839; pg. 86)
