= 1830 United States elections =

- ← 1828 1829 1830 1831 1832 → Midterm elections
- Incumbent president: ▌Andrew Jackson (D)
- Next Congress: 22nd

Senate elections
- Overall control: Democratic hold
- Seats contested: 16 of 48 seats
- Net seat change: Democratic +1

House elections
- Overall control: Democratic hold
- Seats contested: All 213 voting seats
- Net seat change: Anti-Masonic +12
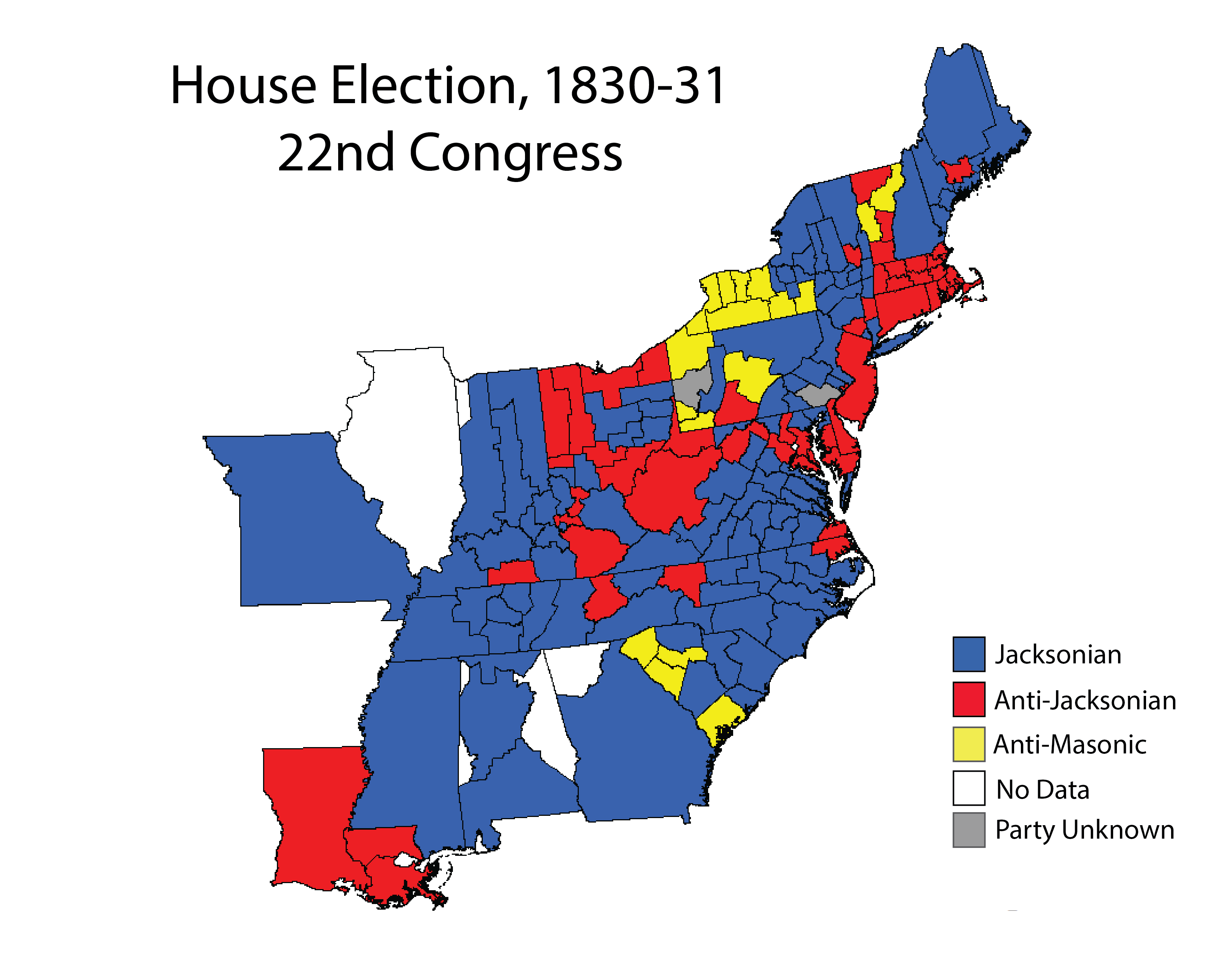
- 1830 House of Representatives election results Democratic seat Anti-Jacksonian seat Anti-Masonic seat

Elections occurred in the middle of Democratic President Andrew Jackson's first term, during the Second Party System. Members of the 22nd United States Congress were chosen in this election. The election saw Jackson's Democrats retain control of both chambers of Congress over the National Republicans and other members of the anti-Jackson faction, while the Nullifier Party won seats in Congress for the first time.

In the House, both major parties lost seats to the Anti-Masonic Party, but Democrats retained a commanding majority.

In the Senate, both parties lost one seat to the Nullifiers, leaving the Democrats with half of the seats in the Senate. No party had a clear majority because Vice President John C. Calhoun aligned with the Nullifiers, and eventually resigned before the end of the 22nd Congress. However, Democrats retained control of the chamber, electing three different President pro tempores: Samuel Smith, Littleton W. Tazewell, and Hugh Lawson White.

== See also ==
- 1830–31 United States House of Representatives elections
- 1830–31 United States Senate elections
