= List of elections in 1833 =

The following elections occurred in the year 1833.

== Europe ==
- 1833 Belgian general election

== North America ==
- 1833 Bahamian general election
- 1833 Central American federal election
- 1833 Costa Rican Head of State election

=== United States ===
==== United States Senate ====
- 1832 and 1833 United States Senate elections
- United States Senate election in New York, 1833
- United States Senate special election in New York, 1833
- United States Senate election in Pennsylvania, 1833

==== United States House of Representatives ====
- 1832 and 1833 United States House of Representatives elections
- 1833 Pennsylvania's 1st congressional district special election
- 1832–33 United States House of Representatives elections in Missouri

==== United States gubernatorial ====
- 1833 Alabama gubernatorial election
- 1833 Connecticut gubernatorial election
- 1833 Georgia gubernatorial election
- 1833 Maine gubernatorial election
- 1833 Maryland gubernatorial election
- 1833–34 Massachusetts gubernatorial election
- 1833 Mississippi gubernatorial election
- 1833 New Hampshire gubernatorial election
- 1833 New Jersey gubernatorial election
- 1833 North Carolina gubernatorial election
- 1833 Rhode Island gubernatorial election
- 1833 Tennessee gubernatorial election
- 1833 Vermont gubernatorial election

==== United States mayoral elections ====
- 1833 Boston mayoral election

== South America ==
- 1833 Colombian presidential election

== See also ==
- Category:1833 elections
