= Luther Reily =

American politician

Luther Reily (October 17, 1794 – February 20, 1854) was a member of the U.S. House of Representatives from Pennsylvania.

Luther Reily was born in Myerstown, Pennsylvania. He studied medicine and began practice in Harrisburg, Pennsylvania. He held various local offices. During the War of 1812, he served as a private in Capt. R.M. Crane’s company of Pennsylvania Volunteers from August 3 to September 7, 1814, and as surgeon’s mate in Maj. Gen. R. Watson’s company from September 7 to December 5, 1814.

Reily was elected as a Democrat to the Twenty-fifth Congress. He resumed the practice of his profession and died in Harrisburg in 1854. Interment in Harrisburg Cemetery.

== Sources ==
- United States Congress. "Luther Reily (id: R000158)". Biographical Directory of the United States Congress.
- The Political Graveyard

U.S. House of Representatives
| Preceded by William Clark | Member of the U.S. House of Representatives from Pennsylvania's 10th congressional district 1837–1839 | Succeeded by William Simonton |
