= 1829 United States Senate special election in New York =

The 1829 United States Senate special election in New York was held on January 15, 1829, by the New York State Legislature to elect a U.S. senator (Class 1) to represent the State of New York in the United States Senate.

== Background ==
Martin Van Buren had been re-elected in 1827 to this seat, but resigned his seat on December 20, 1828, after his election as Governor of New York.

Governor DeWitt Clinton died on February 11, 1828, which led to a re-alignment of the two major parties in the State. The previously opposed "Clintonians" and "Bucktails" (Anti-Clintonians) had lost their reference point, and now became "Jacksonians" (supporters of Andrew Jackson, later known as the Democratic Party, led by Martin Van Buren), and "Anti-Jacksonians" or "Adams men" (supporting the re-election of John Quincy Adams, later known as the National Republican Party). Besides, the Anti-Masonic Party appeared as a strong third party in the western part of the State.

At the State election in November 1828, Van Buren was elected Governor, a Jacksonian majority was elected to the Assembly, and of the nine State Senators elected, four were Jacksonians, four Anti-Masons, and one Adams man who joined the Jacksonians after Adams's defeat for the presidency. The 52nd New York State Legislature met from January 6 to May 5, 1829, at Albany, New York.

== Candidates ==
Governor Van Buren chose one of his personal friends, and member of the Albany Regency, Mayor of Albany Charles E. Dudley to fill the vacancy.

== Result ==
Charles E. Dudley was the choice of both the Assembly and the Senate, and was declared elected.

1829 United States Senator special election result
Office	House	Jacksonian		Anti-Jacksonian
U.S. Senator	State Senate (31 members)	Charles E. Dudley	23	
	State Assembly (127 members)	Charles E. Dudley	79	

== Aftermath ==
Dudley took his seat on January 29, 1829, and remained in office until March 3, 1833.

== Sources ==
- The New York Civil List compiled in 1858 (see: pg. 63 for U.S. Senators; pg. 127f for State Senators 1829; pg. 207ff for Members of Assembly 1829)
- Members of the 20th United States Congress
- History of Political Parties in the State of New-York, Vol. II by Jabez Delano Hammond (State election, 1828: pg. 289ff; U.S. Senate election, 1829: pg. 303ff)
