= The Healing of the Nations =

Book written in the style of the King James Bible

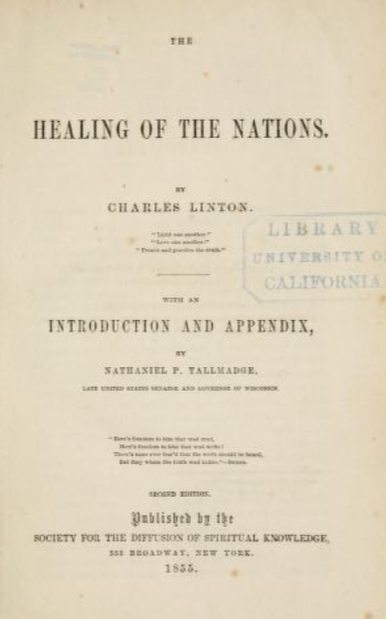
- Title page for The Healing of the Nations (1855)
- Author: Charles Linton
- Genre: Spiritualism
- Publication date: 1855

The Healing of the Nations is an 1855 work by Charles Linton (1828-1886), a 22-year-old blacksmith. The work is a "340-page religious rhapsody" written in the style of the King James Bible. A work of Spiritualism, the work claims Linton merely served as medium, creating the book by automatic writing. The book features an endorsement by Nathaniel P. Tallmadge, formerly a U.S. senator from New York and a governor of the Wisconsin Territory.

== Creation and publication ==
Charles Linton had worked as a blacksmith, a clerk in Philadelphia, and later, a bookkeeper. He became a "writing medium", creating writings purportedly by Daniel Webster and William Shakespeare.

The work was published by The Society for the Diffusion of Spiritual Knowledge, an American spiritualist group that had been organized in 1844 by Tallmadge and others.

== Contents ==
The main text is written by Charles Linton in the style of the King James Bible. It presents a Spiritualist theology dealing with God and creation, the nature of the soul, death and the afterlife, communication between spirits and the living, and the moral improvement of humanity. Christian subjects including Jesus, Scripture, prayer, sin, heaven, and salvation are discussed within this Spiritualist framework.

=== Main text ===
The text is formatted into chapter and verse, in fitting with its emulation of the King James Bible. The text begins:

1. GOD the Father reigneth. His are the heavens and the earth. His is space, and its numberless inhabitants are but fruits of His will.
2. All His creation enjoyeth each one its own perfected happiness.
3. He giveth joy unto all; for He being the center of goodness, His effects are purely happy.

The work presents earthly life as part of a larger spiritual existence and describes death as a transition rather than an end. It also treats communication with spirits as possible and as part of the divine order.

=== Introduction and appendix by Gov. Tallmadge ===
Tallmadge gives a biography of Charles Linton, and then describes personal witness to the work's creation:

A large portion of the book has been written in my presence. I have, therefore, had the very best opportunity of judging of the manner of the writer. During the time I was with him he wrote from five to ten pages a day. He wrote rapidly whilst the influence was on him, and when it left he would cease writing, and generally not resume it till the next day. I have frequently interrupted him in the middle of a sentence, and engaged him in conversation. As soon as the conversation ceased he would go on and finish the sentence without a moment's hesitation.

In the appendix, Tallmadge discusses Linton's claimed mediumship and places the work within the broader Spiritualist belief in communication between the living and the dead.

== Reception ==
Author David Linton listed The Healing of Nations as among the four most important books on religious subjects, observing: "The fact that an un-learned farmer's boy of Pennsylvania should have written so wonderful a book as the 'Healing of the Nations' is to me one of the most wonderful facts of this wonderful age." English researcher Frank Podmore opined that The Healing of Nations "represents inspirational writing at its best".
