= James Clark (Jesuit) =

American Jesuit educator (1809–1885)

The Reverend James Clark SJ
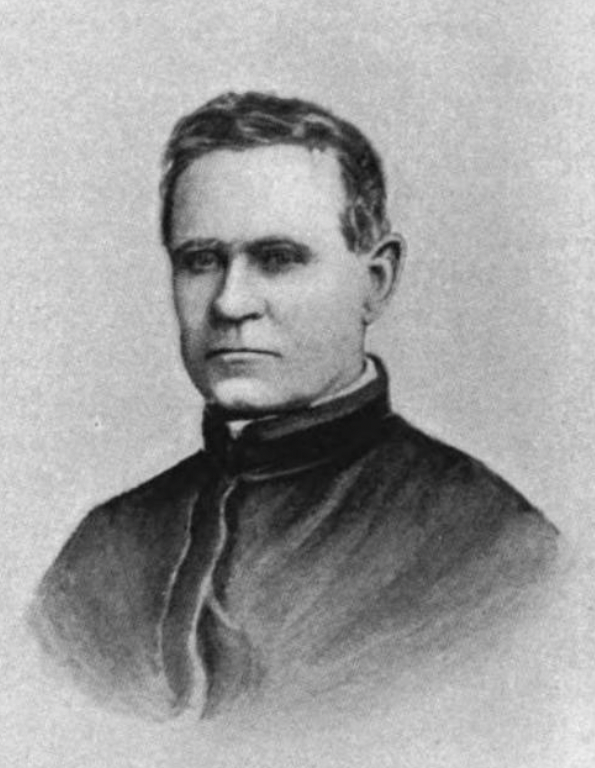
- Portrait of Clark

7th President of the College of the Holy Cross
- In office 1861–1867
- Preceded by: Anthony F. Ciampi
- Succeeded by: Robert W. Brady

Personal details
- Born: October 21, 1809 Meadville, Pennsylvania, U.S.
- Died: September 9, 1885 (aged 75) Washington, D.C., U.S.
- Parent: William Clark (father)
- Education: United States Military Academy; Mount St. Mary's University

Orders
- Ordination: 1847

James Clark SJ (October 21, 1809 – September 9, 1885) was an American Catholic priest and Jesuit who led the College of the Holy Cross during the American Civil War as president from 1861 to 1867. Born in Pennsylvania, he was educated at the United States Military Academy and served as an officer in the U.S. Army for one year, before converting to Catholicism and later entering the Society of Jesus.

Clark held administrative positions and taught mathematics and the sciences at Georgetown University, before being appointed president of Holy Cross. He was not well received as at Holy Cross, where there were frequent complaints that he was overly strict, which led to his removal. From 1869 to 1875, he was the president of Gonzaga College (later a high school) and oversaw its relocation to a new campus on the outskirts of Washington, D.C., which nearly destroyed the school. He spent his later years at Georgetown.

== Early life ==
James Clark was born on October 21, 1809, in Meadville, Pennsylvania. His father, William Clark, was a future congressman and the Treasurer of the United States. Both of Clark's parents were Protestant. He was appointed to the United States Military Academy at West Point, New York as a cadet on July 1, 1825. He graduated on July 1, 1829, with honors and ranked 34th, out of a class of 46 graduates. Among his classmates was Robert E. Lee, and he attended the academy at the same time as Jefferson Davis, who graduated in 1828.

Upon graduating, Clark was assigned to the 4th Infantry Regiment and stationed at Fort St. Philip in Plaquemines Parish, Louisiana, and was promoted to the rank of brevet second lieutenant. He resigned from the U.S. Army on August 18, 1830.

== Early academic career ==
After leaving the army, Clark converted to Catholicism and was baptized in 1834, becoming the second known graduate of West Point to convert to Catholicism. (Note: The first known West Point graduate to convert to Catholicism was Abbott Hall Brisbane, who graduated in 1825.) Clark enrolled in Mount St. Mary's University in Emmitsburg, Maryland. He then taught mathematics, chemistry, and natural philosophy at St. Mary's Seminary and University in Baltimore from 1837 to 1844.

Clark entered the Society of Jesus on August 14, 1844, becoming the first graduate of West Point to do so. He eventually attained the rank of gradus in the order, indicating that he had passed the examen ad gradum at the end of his Jesuit formation and had professed all four vows of the Jesuit order. He was ordained a priest in 1847. From 1845 to 1849, Clark taught at Georgetown University in Washington, D.C., as a professor of mathematics and chemistry.

Clark became a professor of mathematics and chemistry at the College of the Holy Cross in Worcester, Massachusetts during the academic year of 1849 to 1850. He also spent time at the Jesuit novitiate in Frederick, Maryland. He then returned to Georgetown University, where he held multiple positions. He initially became first prefect, before becoming a professor of mathematics, chemistry, and natural philosophy between 1850 and 1861. Additionally, from 1854 to 1857, Clark served as treasurer of the school and from 1859 to 1861 as vice president. In 1861, he was also appointed to the board of visitors of West Point.

== College of the Holy Cross ==
Clark became the president of the College of the Holy Cross on August 10, 1861, succeeding Anthony F. Ciampi. He took office just several months after the start of the American Civil War. The college's enrollment had dropped significantly, numbering just 80 by the end of 1861. The percentage of students from the South and Mid-Atlantic decreased and by the end of the war, nearly all students were from New England. In addition to his duties as president, Clark taught mathematics, physics, and French at the college during the war.

In 1862, Clark oversaw the purchase of 48 acres (19 hectares) of farmland adjacent to the campus, and in 1866, he purchased five more acres. In 1865, the college applied to the Massachusetts General Court for a charter, which was granted, and Governor John Albion Andrew signed the bill chartering the College of the Holy Cross into law on March 24, 1865. Until then, Holy Cross conferred degrees under Georgetown University's charter. On April 24, 1865, Georgetown transferred ownership of the Holy Cross' land and buildings to the newly chartered college.

Some people criticized Clark for people being overly strict and granting the Jesuit scholastics too few liberties. Beginning in 1863, Jesuit scholastics began making formal complaints to the provincial superior, Angelo Paresce, about Clark's leadership. By 1866, complaints about Clark had become frequent, and the Jesuit Superior General, Peter Jan Beckx, informed Clark that he would be removed as president in the middle of the academic year. Clark was succeeded as president of the school by Robert W. Brady on February 27, 1867.

Clark returned to Georgetown University, where he again became the vice president and treasurer of the university, as well as a professor of mathematics.

== Gonzaga College ==
Clark succeeded Bernardin F. Wiget as the president of Gonzaga College (later a high school) in Washington, D.C., in August 1869. Charles H. Stonestreet served as the acting president between Wiget's leave of absence and eventual resignation and Clark's appointment as president. At the same time, Clark became the pastor of St. Aloysius Church. That year, a new Jesuit scholasticate, Woodstock College, opened, which resulted in the removal of many Jesuit teachers from various Jesuit colleges, including Gonzaga, to Woodstock. This required that Clark recruit lay teachers to fill the positions. Many parents of students at Gonzaga College were not pleased, desiring their sons to be taught by Jesuits. As a result, there was sharp decrease in the number of students enrolled in 1869, from several hundred to just 117. The number of students rose slightly over the following several years.

At the 1871 graduation, Clark announced that Gonzaga College would move from F Street NW, between 9th and 10th Streets, to its present location on I Street adjacent to St. Aloysius Church. The college purchased land and a building from the Sisters of Mercy and opened at its new location in September 1871. Many people affiliated with the school disagreed with the decision to relocate from the center of Washington to what was then its outskirts, where there were few buildings and people. The school's sodalities and dramatic and literary societies ceased to exist or were greatly diminished following the move. In 1874, Gonzaga College granted the last academic degrees it would ever confer.

The school's annual fundraising fair was postponed due to the assassination of President Abraham Lincoln in Ford's Theater, one-half block from Gonzaga, on April 14, 1865, and 250 Gonzaga students marched in Lincoln's funeral procession.

The relocation of the school proved to be disastrous and nearly resulted in its closure. The number of students continued to decrease in the final years of Clark's term in office, and the school had incurred substantial debt from relocating and from the construction of St. Aloysius Church. Clark resigned the presidency and was succeeded by Charles K. Jenkins on February 2, 1875.

== Later years ==
After leaving Gonzaga College, Clark returned to Georgetown University as a teacher and spiritual counselor. In 1879, Clark suffered a stroke and became paralyzed. He spent the last six years of his life in the Georgetown University infirmary. He suffered a second stroke and died on the evening of September 9, 1885.

== Notes ==
Academic offices
Preceded by Anthony F. Ciampi	7th President of the College of the Holy Cross; 1861–1867	Succeeded by Robert W. Brady
Preceded by Bernardin F. Wiget	12th President of Gonzaga College; 1869–1875	Succeeded by Charles K. Jenkins
Catholic Church titles
Preceded by Bernardin F. Wiget	4th Pastor of St. Aloysius Church; 1869–1875	Succeeded by Charles K. Jenkins
