= William H. Ebbets =

American lawyer and politician

William Henry Ebbets (January 4, 1825 – March 8, 1890) was an American lawyer and politician.

Born in New York City on January 4, 1825, Ebbets graduated from Columbia University where he was a member of the Philolexian Society. He studied law and was admitted to the New York bar in 1850. He lived in Fond du Lac, Wisconsin from 1850 to 1855, where he practiced law. He served as Fond du Lac County, Wisconsin district attorney. In 1855, Ebbets served in the Wisconsin State Assembly. In 1855, Ebbets moved to Janesville, Wisconsin, where he continued to practice law. From 1873 to his death in 1890, Ebbets lived in Milwaukee, Wisconsin practicing law. He died in Milwaukee was buried at Oak Hill Cemetery in Janesville, Wisconsin.
