= Nathaniel P. Tallmadge =

19th-century American politician

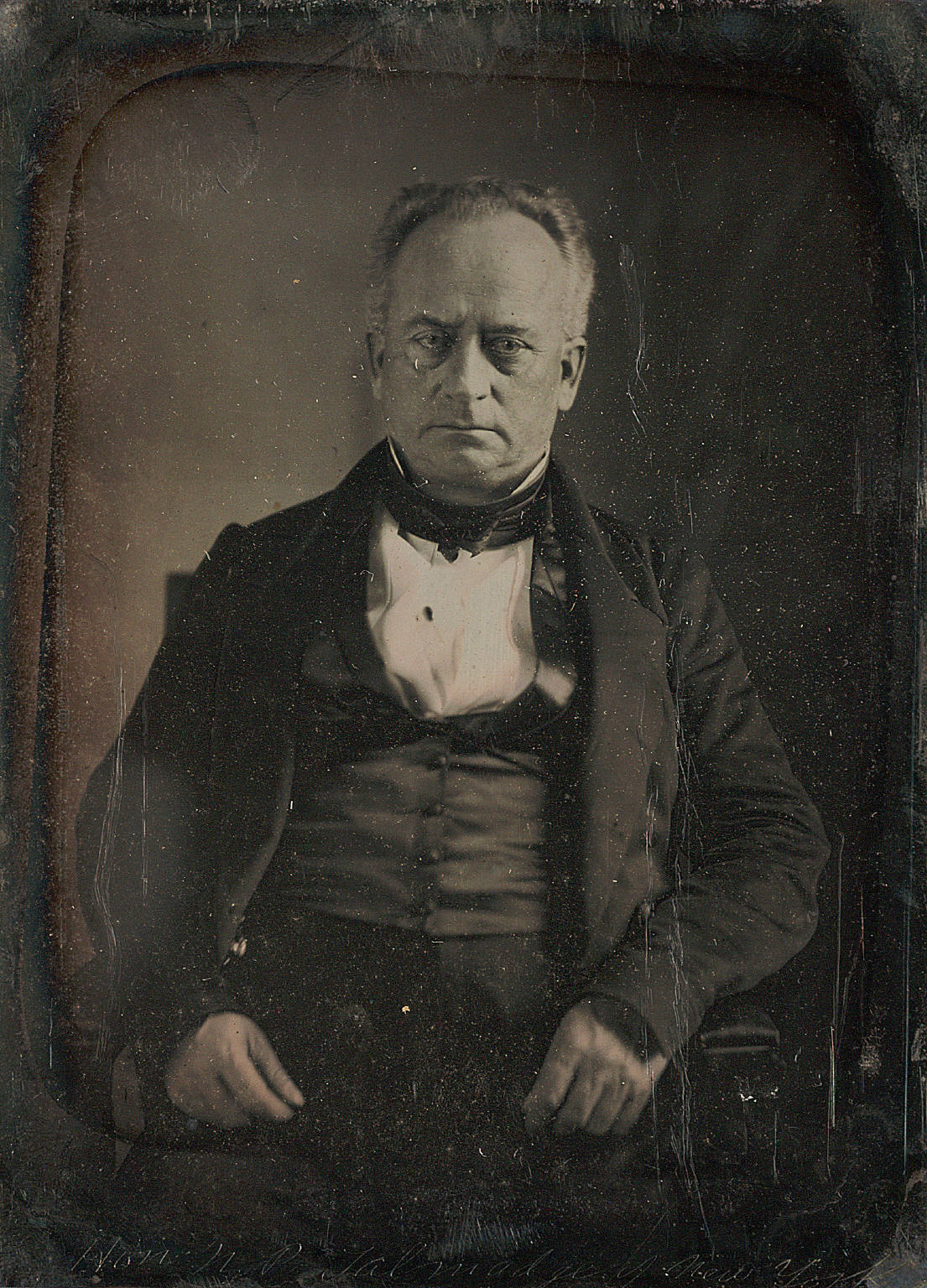
- March 1849 daguerreotype photograph by Mathew Brady

United States Senator from New York
- In office January 14, 1840 – June 17, 1844
- Preceded by: Himself
- Succeeded by: Daniel S. Dickinson
- In office March 4, 1833 – March 4, 1839
- Preceded by: Charles E. Dudley
- Succeeded by: Himself

3rd Governor of Wisconsin Territory
- In office June 21, 1844 – April 8, 1845
- Appointed by: John Tyler
- Preceded by: James Duane Doty
- Succeeded by: Henry Dodge

Member of the New York Senate from the 2nd District (Class 3)
- In office 1830–1833
- Preceded by: Peter R. Livingston
- Succeeded by: Leonard Maison

Personal details
- Born: Nathaniel Potter Tallmadge; February 8, 1795 Chatham, New York, U.S.
- Died: November 2, 1864 (aged 69) Battle Creek, Michigan, U.S.
- Resting place: Rienzi Cemetery, Fond du Lac, Wisconsin
- Party: Jacksonian, Democratic, Whig
- Spouses: Abby Lewis Smith (m. 1824; died 1857); Clementine Ring (m. 1864)
- Children: with Abby Smith; 9 children, including Isaac S. Tallmadge; with Clementine Ring; 1 child
- Relatives: James Tallmadge Jr. (cousin); Matthias B. Tallmadge (cousin); John J. Tallmadge (cousin); Charles Boardman (grandson)
- Education: Union College
- Profession: Lawyer
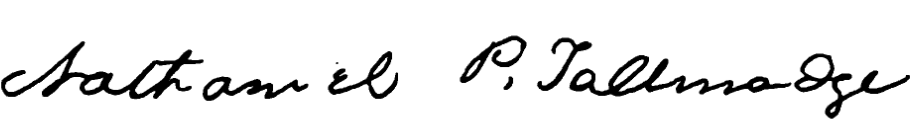
- Signature

Nathaniel P. Tallmadge (February 8, 1795 – November 2, 1864) was an American lawyer, politician, and Wisconsin pioneer. He served two terms as United States senator from New York (1833–1839; 1840–1844) and was the 3rd governor of the Wisconsin Territory (1844–1845). Originally active in politics as a Jacksonian Democrat, he fell out with the party during the presidency of Martin Van Buren and eventually became a Whig.

Tallmadge was one of the first landowners in what is now Fond du Lac, Wisconsin. His former estate outside Fond du Lac is now the site of the city's oldest cemetery, Rienzi Cemetery. He was a member of the Tallmadge (or Talmadge) family of New England, which had many notable members in American political and cultural history. His eldest son, Isaac S. Tallmadge, was a member of the Wisconsin Legislature, and his grandson, Charles R. Boardman, was adjutant general of Wisconsin.

His middle name is a matter of dispute. His Congressional biography and other sources list it as Pitcher, indicating association with New York governor Nathaniel Pitcher; however, his gravestone lists his middle name as Potter—his mother's maiden name.

== Early life ==
Tallmadge was born in Chatham, New York, on February 8, 1795. He attended Williams College before transferring to Union College, from which he graduated in 1815. He then moved to Poughkeepsie to study law with his first cousin, James Tallmadge Jr. He attained admission to the bar in 1818, and entered into a legal practice in partnership with his cousin, James. The partnership continued until James Tallmadge's election as Lieutenant Governor of New York in 1825, after which Nathaniel Tallmadge continued to practice on his own.

== Career ==
Tallmadge became active in politics as a Jacksonian. He was a member of the New York State Assembly (Dutchess Co.) in 1828, and he served in the New York State Senate (2nd D.) from 1830 to 1833, sitting in the 53rd, 54th, 55th and 56th New York State Legislatures.

=== United States Senator ===
In 1833, he was elected as a Jacksonian Democrat to the United States Senate for the term beginning on March 4, 1833. In 1838, he was a member of the "Conservatives," a faction of former Democrats unhappy with the policies of Andrew Jackson's successor, Martin Van Buren and Van Buren's grip on New York politics as head of the Albany Regency political machine. The conservatives endorsed the Whig candidates for Governor and Lieutenant Governor, William H. Seward and Luther Bradish, who were narrowly elected over incumbents William L. Marcy and John Tracy. The defection of the conservatives was considered a harbinger for the 1840 presidential election, at which Van Buren was defeated by William Henry Harrison.

By the time of New York's 1839 election for U.S. Senator, Tallmadge had become identified with the Whigs, who nominated him for reelection. Democrats controlled the State Senate, and they objected to Tallmadge because of his decision to abandon Van Buren. By refusing to vote, the Democrats in the State Senate prevented any candidate from obtaining a majority. As a result of the legislature's failure to make a choice, Tallmadge's seat became vacant on March 4, 1839. By 1840, the Whigs controlled both houses of the legislature. On January 13, 1840, they reelected Tallmadge to the Senate, and indicated in their approved resolutions that the effective date was as of March 4, 1839. He took his seat on January 27, 1840, and served until June 17, 1844, when he resigned to accept appointment as a territorial governor.

In 1840, Tallmadge was offered the Whig nomination for vice president. He declined, and John Tyler was nominated and elected on the Whig ticket with Harrison. According to published accounts in 1841, Tallmadge also declined a cabinet post and an ambassadorship, because he preferred to remain in the Senate.

=== Governor of Wisconsin Territory ===
In the early 1840s, Tallmadge purchased a large tract of land in what became Fond du Lac, Wisconsin, in anticipation of constructing a home for his retirement; he was likely drawn to Fond du Lac by his former associate from Poughkeepsie, Henry Conklin. In 1844, John Tyler, who had become president following Harrison's death, offered Tallmadge the governorship of Wisconsin Territory. He accepted, and moved to Fond du Lac. The Senate confirmed the appointment in June, and Tallmadge arrived in Wisconsin in August. James Duane Doty, who had been governor since 1841, had a contentious relationship with the territorial legislature. Although legislators were initially suspicious of Tallmadge, who had not lived in Wisconsin prior to his appointment, he won them over by taking a conciliatory approach in his initial message. Promising not to take an overly partisan approach, he advocated for the expansion of railroads, in keeping with the position he had taken as a state legislator and a U.S. Senator. He also argued against extending the naturalization period for Wisconsin citizenship to 21 years, and promoted experimental farms and agricultural societies. The legislature authorized printing and distribution of his message, including 750 copies in German, the first time Wisconsin legislators had ever taken such an action.

The 1844 presidential election was won by Democrat James K. Polk. In April 1845, Polk nominated Henry Dodge to serve as territorial governor. Dodge, who had also been Wisconsin Territory's first governor, was easily confirmed by the U.S. Senate, and assumed his new post on April 8, 1845.

=== Later years ===
Tallmadge decided to stay in Wisconsin, and built his planned residence in Fond du Lac, where he practiced law while living in semi-retirement. He also maintained a home in Washington, D.C., where he frequently traveled to serve as an unofficial ambassador for Wisconsin to the federal government and lobbyist for its interests.

Later in his life Tallmadge became a spiritualist, and was convinced of the existence of the afterlife. He had previously been a believer in premonitions, and claimed he had one that resulted in him narrowly escaped death aboard the USS Princeton when a cannon exploded and took the lives of five people. In the 1840s, he began to claim that he was visited by spirits, and he authored introduction to Charles Linton's The Healing of the Nations, a book which Linton claimed had been dictated to him by ghosts. He also wrote an Appendix to the first volume of Spiritualism by John W. Edmonds and George T. Dexter. After the death of John C. Calhoun, Tallmadge claimed to be visited by his spirit, and said that it could communicate with him. Tallmadge was also reported to be a believer in other supposed spirit communications, including the floor and table rappings that typically accompanied séances.

== Personal life and family ==
Nathaniel Tallmadge was the eighth of at least ten children born to Joel Tallmadge (1756–1834) and his wife Phebe Rhoda (née Potter; 1779–1842). Joel Tallmadge was a veteran of the American Revolutionary War and a blacksmith before attaining success as a farmer and lumber merchant at his home on Tallmadge Hill in Barton, New York. The Tallmadge family were descendants of Thomas Talmadge, who emigrated from England to the Massachusetts Bay Colony about 1633.

Nathaniel's first cousin, James Tallmadge Jr., was a U.S. representative from New York (1817–1819), Lieutenant Governor of New York (1825–1826), and first President of New York University from its founding (which James had helped with) in 1831 until 1850. James's sister, another first cousin of Nathaniel, was Rebecca Tallmadge, who married Theodorus Bailey, a U.S. representative and United States senator from New York, as well as postmaster of New York City. Nathaniel's other contemporary first cousins also included Benjamin Tallmadge, the celebrated leader of the Culper spy ring, which operated against the British occupation of New York City during the American Revolutionary War, and John J. Tallmadge, who served as mayor of Milwaukee in the 1860s. Through the Tallmadge family's many lines and descendants, Nathaniel is a distant cousin of Ernest Hemingway and Ben Affleck.

In 1824, Tallmadge was married to Abigail Lewis Smith (1804–1857), the daughter of Judge Isaac Smith of Washington, New York. He had nine children with her before her death in 1857. In 1864, Tallmadge married for a second time, to Clementine Ring. The children of Nathaniel Tallmadge were:

- Isaac Smith Tallmadge (1824–1882), who became a member of the Wisconsin State Assembly.
- William Davies Tallmadge (1827–1845), who died soon after his graduation from Union College.
- Grier Tallmadge (1827–1862), a United States Military Academy graduate and captain in the United States Army. He died at Fort Monroe during the American Civil War.
- Louisa Tallmadge (1829–1830), who died young.
- Mary Louisa Tallmadge (1831–1893), the wife of first Napoleon Boardman of Wisconsin, and second William Baldwin of Philadelphia.
- Laura Tallmadge (1833–1889), the wife of Dr. William T. Galloway of Eau Claire, Wisconsin.
- John James Tallmadge (1835–1897), the postmaster of Peebles, Wisconsin, and the Peebles agent for the Sheboygan and Fond du Lac Railroad
- Julia Tallmadge (1835–1919), the wife of bank president Augustus G. Ruggles of Fond du Lac.
- Emily Bartlett Tallmadge (1840–1900), the wife of James D. Tallmadge of Chicago.

Through his daughter Mary Louisa Tallmadge (wife of Napoleon Boardman), he was a grandfather of Charles Ruggles Boardman, who served as adjutant general of Wisconsin from 1897 to 1913.

When his son William died in 1845, Tallmadge buried him on a piece of his land outside Fond du Lac. In 1853, Tallmadge donated eight and a half acres around his son's grave to be used in creating a cemetery, now known as Rienzi Cemetery. The cemetery trustees subsequently purchased 24 additional acres, which it used for expansion. The cemetery is now 60 acres and represents the final resting place for 24,000 people, including most of the notable residents of Fond du Lac throughout history.

In his later years, Tallmadge resided in Harmonia, a planned community for spiritualists in Battle Creek, Michigan. He died in Battle Creek on November 2, 1864, and was buried at Rienzi Cemetery in Fond du Lac.

== Sources ==
=== Books ===
- Andreas, A. T. (1881). History of Northern Wisconsin. Chicago, IL: Western Historical Company.
- Byrd, Robert C. (1993). The Senate, 1789-1989. Vol. 4, Historical Statistics. Washington, DC: US Government Printing Office. ISBN 9780160632563.
- Edmonds, Michael; Snyder, Samantha (2017). Warriors, Saints, and Scoundrels. Madison, WI: Wisconsin Historical Society Press. ISBN 978-0-87020-792-1.
- Gutierrez, Cathy (2009). Plato's Ghost: Spiritualism in the American Renaissance. New York, NY: Oxford University Press. ISBN 978-0-19-538835-0.
- Lanman, Charles (1887). Biographical Annals of the Civil Government of the United States. New York, NY: Joseph M. Morrison. p. 489.
- New York State Assembly (1840). Journal of the Assembly of the State of New York (1840). Albany, NY: Thurlow Weed.
- Raymond, William (1851). Biographical Sketches of the Distinguished Men of Columbia County. Albany, NY: Weed, Parsons and Company. p. 86.
- Talmadge, Arthur White (1909). The Talmadge, Tallmadge and Talmage Genealogy. New York, NY: Grafton Press.
- Wilson, Brian C. (2014). Dr. John Harvey Kellogg and the Religion of Biologic Living. Bloomington, IN: Indiana University Press. ISBN 978-0-253-01447-4.
- Excelsior Publishing (1894). Portrait and Biographical Record of Sheboygan County, Wisconsin. Chicago, IL: Excelsior Publishing Company.

=== Magazines ===
- Edwards, E. J. (May 1895). "Tammany: Early Spoilsmen, and the Reign of the Plug-Uglies". McClure's. Vol. IV, no. 6. New York, NY: S. S. McClure, Limited.
- Kellogg, Louise Phelps (June 1920). "The Story of Wisconsin, 1634-1848: Chapter VI, Politics and Statehood". The Wisconsin Magazine of History. Vol. 3, no. 4. Madison, WI: State Historical Society of Wisconsin.

=== Internet ===
- Garrett, Eugene G. (2016). "Photo Description, Brigadier General Charles R. Boardman". oshkosh.pastperfectonline.com. Oshkosh, WI: Oshkosh Public Museum.

== Notes ==
New York State Senate
Preceded by Peter R. Livingston	Member of the New York Senate from the 2nd District (Class 3); 1830–1833	Succeeded by Leonard Maison
U.S. Senate
Preceded by Charles E. Dudley	U.S. senator (Class 1) from New York; 1833–1839; 1840–1844; Served alongside: Silas Wright Jr.	Succeeded by Daniel S. Dickinson
Political offices
Preceded by James D. Doty	Governor of the Wisconsin Territory; 1844–1845	Succeeded by Henry Dodge
