= Garrick Mallery =

American ethnologist

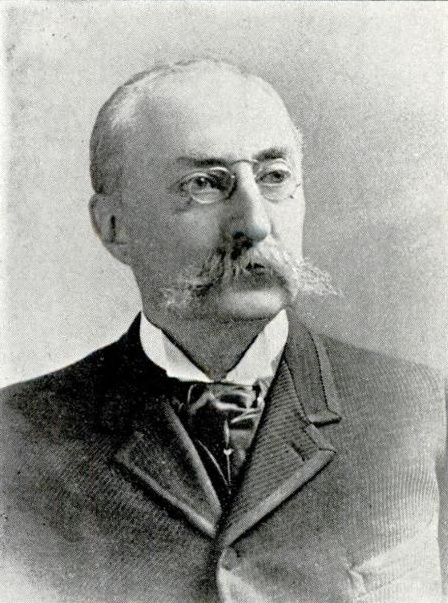
- Mallery c. 1892
- Born: April 25, 1831; Wilkes-Barre, Pennsylvania, U.S.
- Died: October 24, 1894 (aged 63); Washington, D.C., U.S.
- Burial place: Arlington National Cemetery
- Relatives: Garrick Mallery (father)
- Military career
- Allegiance: United States of America
- Branch: Union Army (1861–1866); United States Army (1866–1879)
- Service years: 1861–1879
- Rank: Lieutenant Colonel
- Units: 71st Pennsylvania Infantry Regiment; 13th Pennsylvania Cavalry Regiment; United States Army Signal Corps
- Conflicts: American Civil War; American Indian Wars

Garrick Mallery (April 25, 1831 in Wilkes-Barre, Pennsylvania – October 24, 1894) was an American ethnologist specializing in Native American sign language and pictographs.

== Family ==
His father was Judge Garrick Mallery, who was born April 17, 1784, and graduated at Yale College in 1808. He was a member of the Pennsylvania legislature from 1827 to 1830, and was distinguished for the zeal with which he promoted prison reform. In 1831 he was appointed judge of the third judicial district, composed of the Pennsylvania counties of Berks, Northampton, and Lehigh. He resigned from the bench in 1836 and removed to Philadelphia, where he practiced as a lawyer for many years. He died in Philadelphia on July 6, 1866.

Garrick's mother was the judge's second wife. She was descended from John Harris, Jr., the founder of Harrisburg, and from William Maclay, one of the first United States senators from Pennsylvania, and their wives.

== Education ==
Mallery received an excellent early education and was prepared by a private tutor for his entrance into his father's alma mater, Yale College, where he matriculated in his fifteenth year. He graduated in 1850. Three years later, he received the degree of LL.B. from the University of Pennsylvania. In the same year he was admitted to the bar in Philadelphia and commenced practice there. He devoted some of his leisure time to editorial and literary work, and was steadily advancing in professional standing when the Civil War began in 1861.

== Military career ==
Mallery was a volunteer and served as a first-lieutenant in the 71st Pennsylvania Infantry. On June 30, 1862, he was severely wounded at Peach Orchard (Allen's Farm) during the Seven Days Battles in Virginia. Having been left on the battlefield unable to move, he was captured and sent to Libby Prison, in Richmond. Upon being exchanged some time later, he was sent to his home in Philadelphia.

When recovered, he returned to the field and, in February 1863, was commissioned as lieutenant colonel of the 13th Pennsylvania Cavalry. During the military occupation of Virginia, Mallery was appointed judge advocate of the First Military District. He was honorably mustered out of the volunteer service in November 1866.

At the same time he accepted a commission in the regular army as captain, with an assignment to the 43rd Infantry, where he received the brevet commissions of major, lieutenant-colonel, and colonel for "gallant and meritorious services during the war." Beginning in 1870, he was on duty with the Signal Corps for almost ten years and served as executive officer, until he was posted to field duty in 1876. Due to his old wounds rendering him unfit for strenuous work, he was retired at his own request in 1879.

== Bureau of American Ethnology ==
During Mallery's tenure with the Signal Corps, he was briefly stationed at Fort Rice in Dakota Territory, where the indigenous system of communication by signs and gestures attracted his attention. He began to make note of them, which led to a parallel investigation of the pictographs on rocks, skins, and bark, of which he made a large number of transcriptions. He foresaw that these customs would ultimately be lost and forgotten as the Indians were brought more and more under the control of the authorities. Before Mallery began his researches, European Americans generally supposed that the pictographs, some of which were believed to be of pre-Columbian origin, were simply pictures and devoid of meaning. He was gradually convinced that gesture-speech and the cognate pictographs formed a complete system, involving mythology and history and having an important relation to the spoken language.

In 1877, as a result of this work, he was ordered to report to Major John Wesley Powell, who was doing a survey of the Rocky Mountain region. Later, when Mallery retired from the Army, Powell arranged for his appointment as an ethnologist with the Bureau of American Ethnology, which had been established that year. In 1880 Mallery produced a 72-page pamphlet, with 33 figures, entitled "Introduction to the Study of Sign-language among the North American Indians as Illustrating the Gesture-speech of Mankind". This was intended as a manual for students. In the same year, he prepared a quarto volume of 329 pages, entitled "A Collection of Gesture Signs and Signals of the North American Indians, with Some Comparisons." The latter work was distributed to collaborators only.

In 1881 Mallery's second important contribution was published in the First Annual Report of the Bureau, namely, "Sign-language among North American Indians Compared with that Among other People and Deaf-mutes." This treatise comprised 290 pages and was illustrated with 13 plates, a map, and 285 figures. While intended by its author as a preliminary report only, it is now considered to be the first authoritative exposition upon an almost entirely new subject in the field of anthropology.

Mallery's next publication appeared in the Fourth Annual Report of the Bureau, under the title, "Pictographs of the North American Indians; a Preliminary Paper." It consisted of 256 pages, illustrated with 83 plates and 209 figures.

Finally, the Tenth Annual Report of the Bureau was devoted to Mallery's completed work on one of his subjects of investigation. It was entitled, "Picture-writing of the American Indians," filling 807 quarto pages, with 54 plates and 1,290 figures. Mallery's work included a recognition of winter counts of various tribes, which were documented in pictures and visual means, were important keys to their histories, together with oral history transmission.

At the time of his death, Mallery was preparing a treatise on the sign-language of the American Indians, intended to be a companion work to "Picture-writing". This was left unfinished and had to be completed by his colleagues at the Bureau.

In 1882, Mallery was elected as a member of the American Philosophical Society.

== Other activities ==
In addition to the foregoing writings, Mallery was the author of many short critical essays. His "Israelite and Indian", which compared the two cultures, was notable for stirring up a brief controversy. He founded and later served as President of Washington's Anthropological Society. In 1878, he was one of ten founding members of the Cosmos Club, an honorary society. He was also involved with the Literary Society of Washington, where he was a member of the General Committee for many years and served as its President in 1888. His address on retiring from that office had for its subject "Philosophy and Specialties." In it he insisted upon the importance of using a correct and elegant style of writing in scientific papers.

== Available works ==
- The College Experience of Ichabod Academicus (1850)
- Picture-writing of the American Indians. Foreword by J. W. Powell. Dover (1972), 2 v. ISBN 0-486-22842-8
- Sign Language Among North American Indians, Dover (2001) ISBN 0-486-41948-7

== Source cited ==
This article incorporates text from Brief memoirs of Colonel Garrick Mallery, by Robert Fletcher, a publication from 1895, now in the public domain in the United States.

- Fletcher, Robert (16 February 1895), Brief memoirs of Colonel Garrick Mallery, U.S.A., who died October 24, 1894, Washington: Judd & Detweiler, pp. 3–8, briefmemoirsofco00fletrich at the Internet Archive
