= Adam King (American politician) =

American politician

Member of the U.S. House of Representatives from Pennsylvania's 10th district
- In office March 4, 1827 – March 3, 1833
- Preceded by: James S. Mitchell
- Succeeded by: William Clark

Personal details
- Born: Johann Adam King; January 20, 1783 York, Pennsylvania, U.S.
- Died: May 6, 1835 (aged 52) York, Pennsylvania, U.S.
- Resting place: Prospect Hill Cemetery
- Party: Jacksonian
- Education: University of Pennsylvania

Adam King (January 20, 1783 – May 6, 1835) was a Jacksonian member of the U.S. House of Representatives from Pennsylvania.

== Early life ==
Johann Adam King was born in York, Pennsylvania on January 20, 1783. He studied medicine in the University of Pennsylvania at Philadelphia and commenced practice in York.

== Career ==
He edited and published the York Gazette from 1818 to 1835. He served as clerk of the courts of York County, Pennsylvania, from 1818 to 1826.

On January 29, 1825, Dr. Adam King, Col. M.H.Spangler, and Jacob Spangler escorted Gilbert du Motier, marquis de La Fayette and his son George Washington Lafayette, who were touring America, to Harrisburg, Pennsylvania. They returned to York on February 2, where they were greeted by six military companies and large crowds of people hailing Lafayette.

King was elected to the Twentieth Congress and reelected as a Jacksonian to the Twenty-first and Twenty-second Congresses. He was an unsuccessful candidate for reelection in 1832 to the Twenty-third Congress. King then resumed the practice of medicine.

== Death ==
King died in York on May 6, 1835. He was interred at Prospect Hill Cemetery.

His obituary indicates that he died at home by suicide on May 6, 1835. However, his tombstone reads: "Dr. Adam King January 20, 1783 – May 7, 1835 For 6 years (from Mar 4, 1827 – Mar 4, 1833) the deceased ably and honorably represented the county of York in the Congress of the U.S".

== Sources ==
- United States Congress. "Adam King (id: K000192)". Biographical Directory of the United States Congress.
- The Political Graveyard

U.S. House of Representatives
Preceded by James S. Mitchell	Member of the U.S. House of Representatives from Pennsylvania's 10th congressional district 1827–1833	Succeeded by William Clark
