= Garrick Mallery (judge) =

American judge

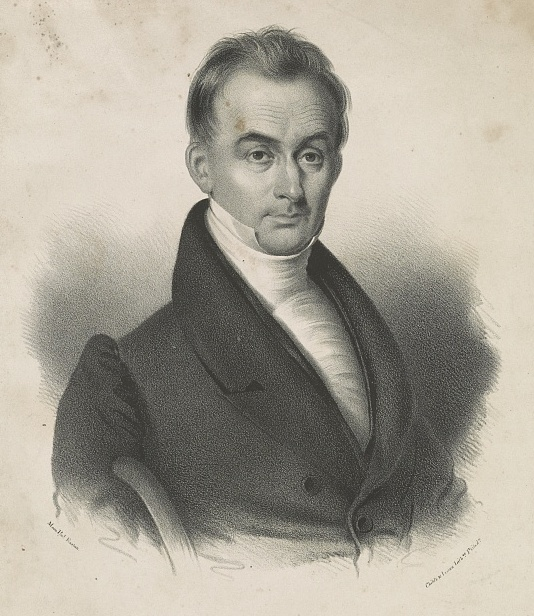
- Garrick Mallery

President Judge of the Third Judicial District of Pennsylvania
- In office 1831–1836
- Appointed by: Governor George Wolf

Personal details
- Born: April 17, 1784 Woodbury, Connecticut, U.S.
- Died: July 6, 1866 (aged 82) Philadelphia, Pennsylvania, U.S.
- Children: 4, including Garrick Mallery

Garrick Mallery (April 17, 1784 – July 6, 1866) was an American jurist and politician. He served several terms in the Pennsylvania General Assembly.

== Early life and education ==
Mallery was born in Woodbury, Connecticut. He graduated from Yale College in 1808. For some time after graduation he was principal of the Academy at Wilkes-Barre, Pennsylvania, where he read law with Mr. Wells. He also attended the Litchfield Law School and was admitted to practice at Wilkes-Barre, in 1811.

== Career ==
In 1827 he was elected to the Pennsylvania legislature, without party nomination, and was reelected in 1828, 1829 and 1830. From his position as chairman of the respective committees, he was largely instrumental in establishing the General Improvement and Penitentiary systems of Pennsylvania. In 1831 he was appointed by Governor George Wolf, President Judge of the Third Judicial District of that State, which position he resigned in 1836, and in November of the same year removed to Philadelphia, to resume the active practice of law. In this he was eminently successful. For several years past he held the office of Master in Chancery for the Supreme Court of Pennsylvania. He received in 1840 the degree of LL. D. from Lafayette College.

Judge Mallery was at the time of his death the oldest practicing member of the bar of Philadelphia. To such an extent did he retain his vigor, that only six weeks before his death he conducted a most important and hotly contested jury trial, lasting more than a week.

== Personal life ==
Mallery married three times and left four children, including ethnologist Garrick Mallery. He died in Philadelphia on July 6, 1866, at the age of 82.
