= Charles R. Boardman =

American World War I general

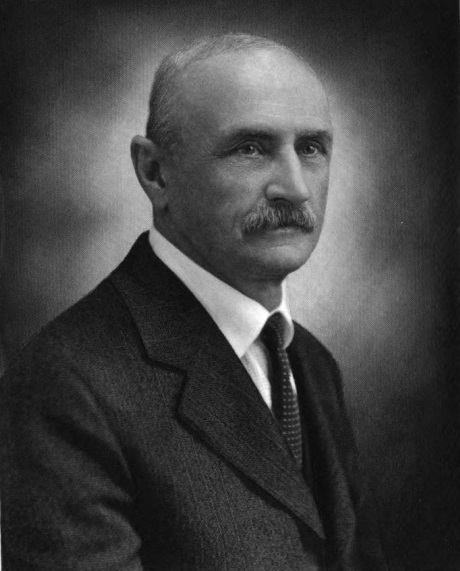
- From Volume III (1930) of History of the Fox River Valley, Lake Winnebago, and the Green Bay Region

20th Adjutant General of Wisconsin
- In office January 4, 1897 – August 1, 1913
- Governor: Edward Scofield; Robert M. La Follette; James O. Davidson; Francis E. McGovern
- Preceded by: Charles King
- Succeeded by: Orlando Holway

Personal details
- Born: Charles Ruggles Boardman; October 28, 1860 Empire, Wisconsin, U.S.
- Died: April 5, 1950 (aged 89) Oshkosh, Wisconsin, U.S.
- Resting place: Riverside Cemetery, Oshkosh, Wisconsin
- Spouse: Adelaide Ryan Paige (m. 1888; died 1934)
- Children: Robert Paige Boardman
- Relatives: Nathaniel P. Tallmadge (grandfather)
- Education: University of Wisconsin (B.A.)

Military service
- Allegiance: United States
- Branch/service: Wisconsin National Guard; United States Army
- Years of service: 1879–1913 (ARNG); 1917–1918 (USA)
- Rank: Brig. General, USA
- Commands: 64th Bde., 32nd Div., U.S. Infantry
- Battles/wars: World War I

Charles Ruggles Boardman (October 28, 1860 – April 5, 1950) was an American journalist, businessman, and Army National Guard officer. He served 16 years as Adjutant General of Wisconsin (1897–1913) and commanded the 64th Brigade of U.S. Infantry during World War I. In civilian life, he was a founder and president of the Wisconsin National Life Insurance Company.

== Early life and education ==
Charles Ruggles Boardman was born in Empire, Fond du Lac County, Wisconsin, on October 28, 1860, to Colonel Napoleon Boardman and his wife Mary Louise (née Tallmadge). He attended Fond du Lac High School, graduating in 1878. He attended the University of Wisconsin–Madison and graduated with a Bachelor of Arts degree in 1884.

== Civilian career ==
Boardman moved to Oshkosh, Wisconsin, in 1884 after graduating from the University of Wisconsin. In 1884, he was the city editor for the Daily Northwestern, the main daily newspaper in Oshkosh. In 1889, he became the secretary-treasurer of the paper. From 1884 to 1887, he also served as the newspaper's business manager.

In 1895, he helped found the Wisconsin National Life Insurance Company. He served as president of the company from 1908 to 1946. and president of the Globe Printing Company.

== Military career ==
In 1879, he enlisted in the Wisconsin National Guard, joining a company called the "Fond du Lac Guards" as a private. In 1885, he was promoted to captain. By 1889, he had received a promotion to major. On January 4, 1897, he was appointed Adjutant General of Wisconsin by Governor Edward Scofield.

He retired on October 1, 1913. He transferred to the National Guard Reserve on May 1, 1917, and was given command of the First Wisconsin Infantry Brigade.

He was sent to France during World War I. While overseas, he commanded the 64th Infantry Brigade as a brigadier general of the 32nd Infantry Division. He was relieved by General John A. Lejeune on August 11, 1918.

On August 13, 1918, he received an honorable discharge. He served for a total of thirty-eight years and was one of the oldest American general officers during World War I.

== Personal life ==
Boardman's maternal grandfather was Nathaniel P. Tallmadge, who served as a United States senator from New York and was the 3rd governor of the Wisconsin Territory.

He married Adelaide Ryan Paige on July 13, 1888. Together, they had a son, Robert Paige Boardman, who was also an Army officer. His wife died in 1934.

== Death and legacy ==
He died on April 5, 1950, in Oshkosh. He was interred at Riverside Cemetery in Oshkosh.

Military offices
Preceded by Charles King	Adjutant General of Wisconsin; January 4, 1897 – August 1, 1913	Succeeded by Orlando Holway
