= William Clark (Pennsylvania politician) =

American politician

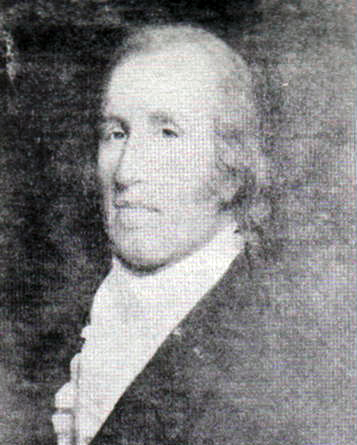
- Portrait of William Clark, US Representative from Pennsylvania

Member of the U.S. House of Representatives from Pennsylvania's 10th district
- In office March 4, 1833 – March 4, 1837
- Preceded by: Adam King
- Succeeded by: Luther Reily

4th Treasurer of the United States
- In office June 4, 1828 – November 1829
- President: John Quincy Adams; Andrew Jackson
- Preceded by: Thomas Tudor Tucker
- Succeeded by: John Campbell

Personal details
- Born: February 18, 1774 Dauphin, Province of Pennsylvania, British America
- Died: March 28, 1851 (aged 77) Dauphin, Pennsylvania, U.S.
- Resting place: English Presbyterian Cemetery
- Party: Anti-Masonic
- Children: James

William Clark (February 18, 1774 – March 28, 1851) was a farmer, jurist, and politician from Dauphin, Pennsylvania.

== Biography ==
He served as secretary of the Pennsylvania land office from 1818 to 1821, and State treasurer from 1821 to 1827. He was Treasurer of the United States from June 4, 1828 to November 1829.

Clark was elected as an Anti-Masonic candidate to the Twenty-third and Twenty-fourth Congresses. He was a member of the State constitutional revision commission in 1837. After Congress, he engaged in agricultural pursuits and died near Dauphin in 1851. He was interred in English Presbyterian Cemetery.

U.S. House of Representatives
Preceded by Adam King	Member of the U.S. House of Representatives from Pennsylvania's 10th congressional district 1833–1837	Succeeded by Luther Reily
Political offices
Preceded by Thomas Tudor Tucker	Treasurer of the United States; 1828–1829	Succeeded by John Campbell
