= 1833 United States Senate election in New York =

- February 5, 1833

Majority approval in both houses needed to win
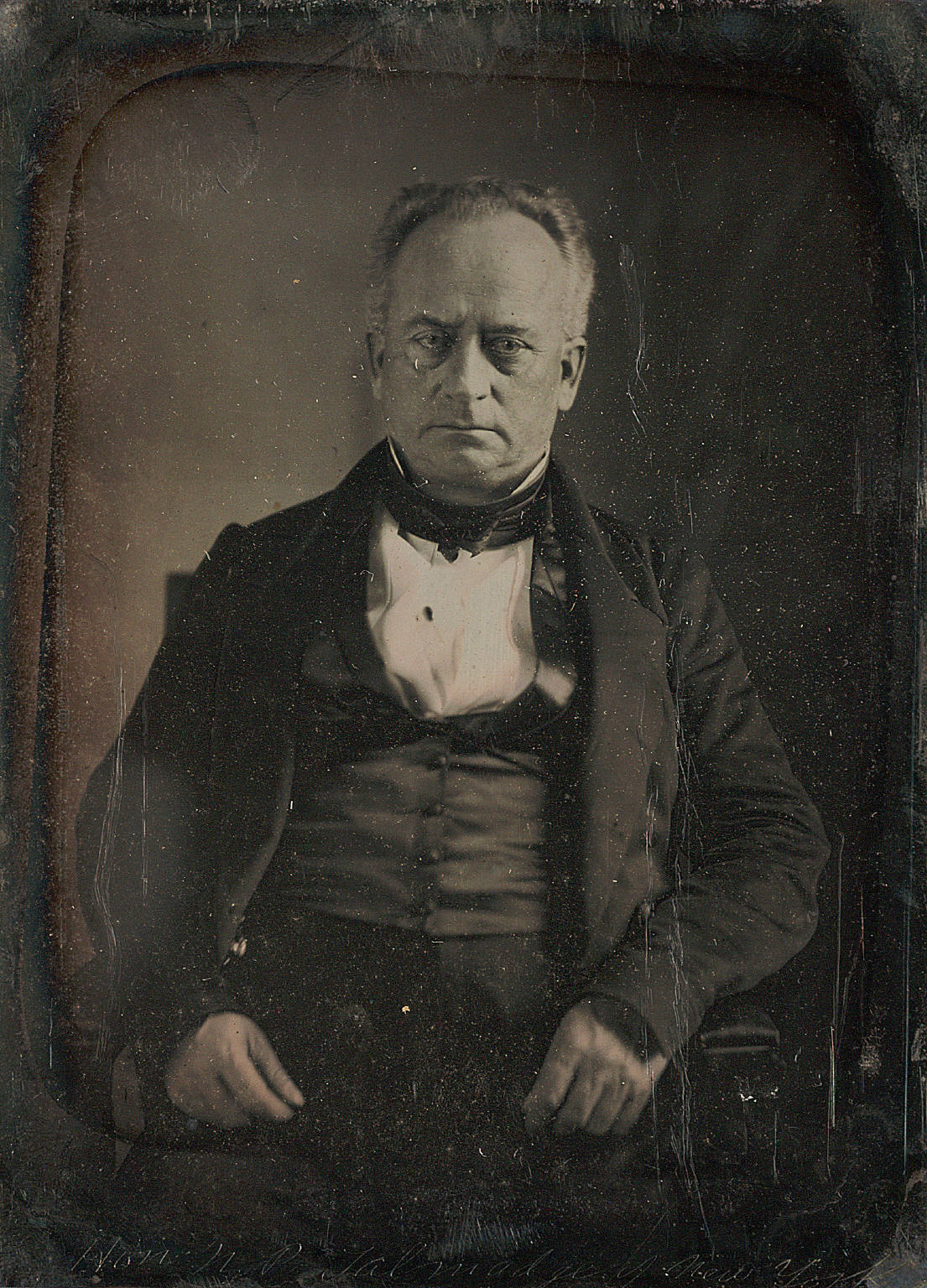

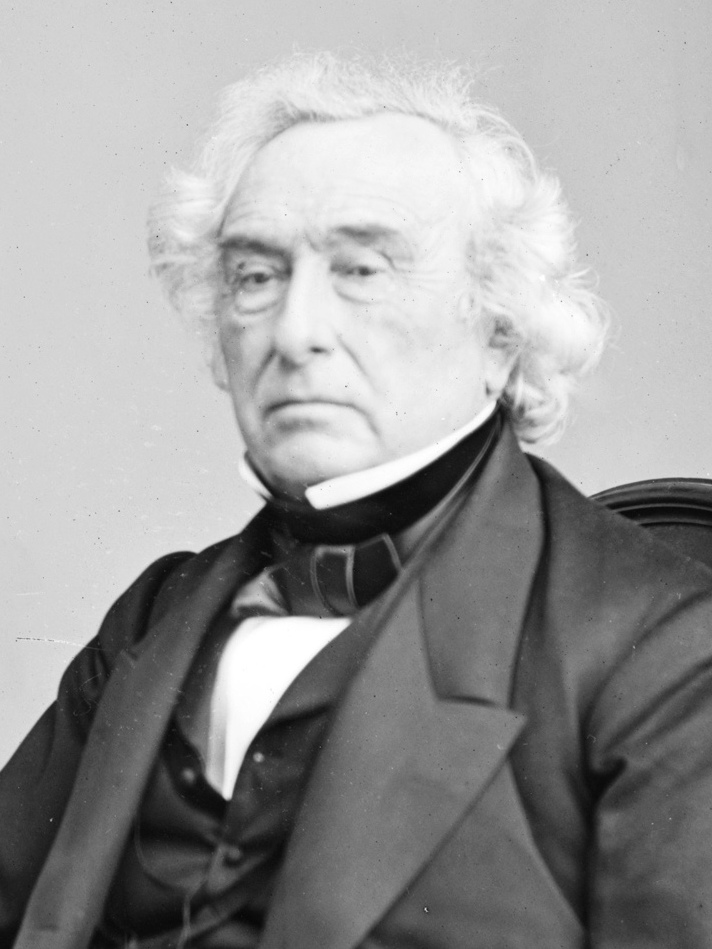

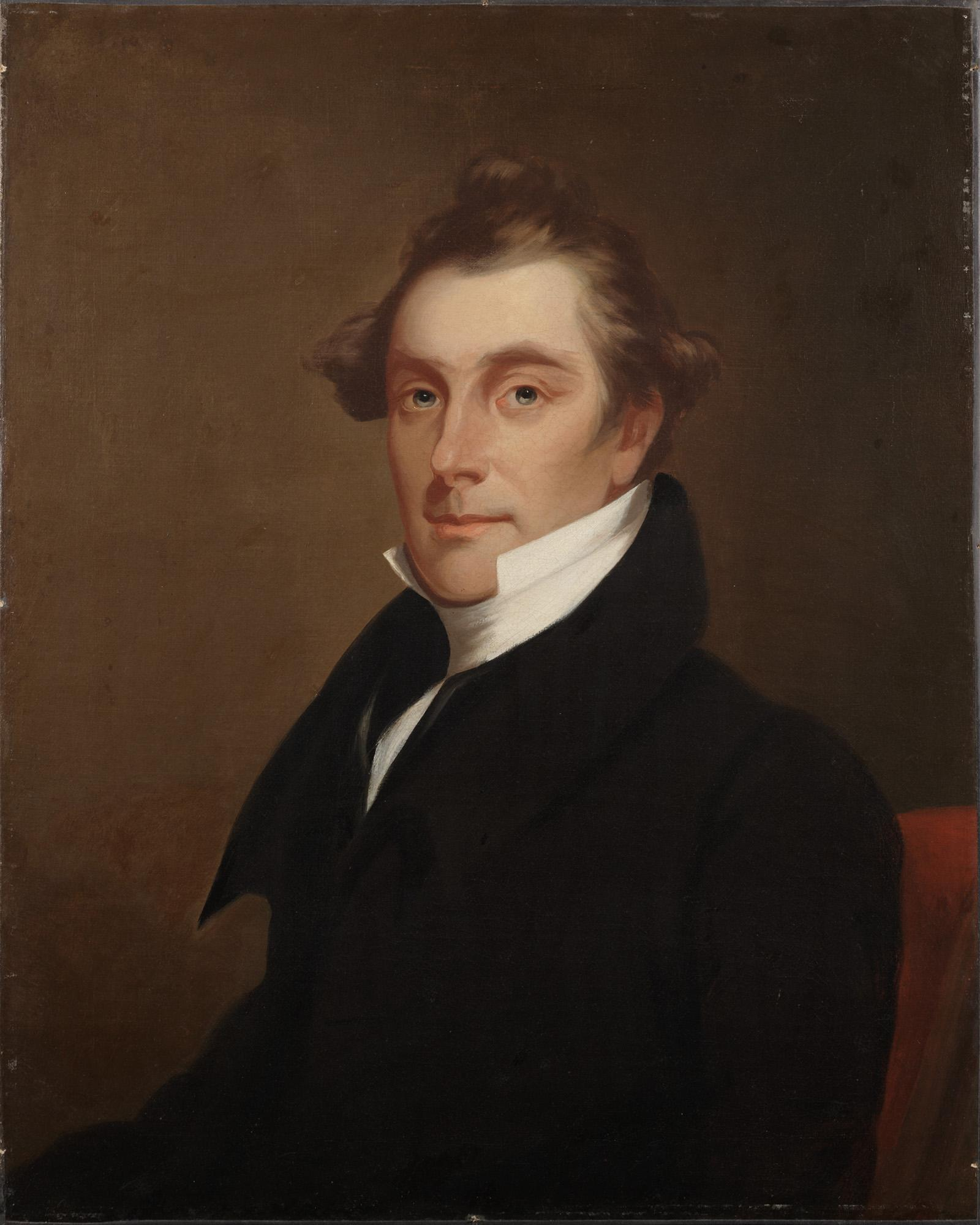
Candidate	Nathaniel P. Tallmadge	Francis Granger	Benjamin F. Butler
Party	Jacksonian	National Republican	Jacksonian
Alliance		Anti-Masonic
Senate	18	6	2
Senate %	56.2%	18.75%	6.25%
House	69	25	12
House %	53.9%	19.5%	9.4%
U.S. senator before election
Charles E. Dudley
Jacksonian
Elected U.S. Senator
Nathaniel P. Tallmadge
Jacksonian

The 1833 United States Senate election in New York was held on February 5, 1833, by the New York State Legislature. Interim Senator Charles E. Dudley was not put forward for re-election to a full term. Jacksonian Nathaniel P. Tallmadge was elected to succeed him after narrowly winning a Jacksonian legislative caucus over Benjamin F. Butler. He then narrowly won majorities in both houses of the legislature.

== Background ==
Charles E. Dudley had been elected in 1829 to this seat to fill the vacancy caused by the resignation of Martin Van Buren who had been elected Governor in November 1828. Dudley's term would expire on March 3, 1833.

At the State election in November 1832, a very large Jacksonian-Democratic majority was elected to the Assembly, and six of the eight State Senators elected were Jacksonian Democrats. The 56th New York State Legislature met from January 1 to April 30, 1833, at Albany, New York. The party strength in the Assembly as shown by the election for Speaker was: 99 for Jacksonian Democrat Charles L. Livingston and 22 for Anti-Mason John C. Spencer.

== Candidates ==
On February 2, the Jacksonian Democratic State legislators held a caucus to nominate a candidate. The members were divided between Nathaniel P. Tallmadge, New York Supreme Court Justice Jacob Sutherland, and Ex-Assemblyman Benjamin F. Butler. On the first ballot no-one received a majority. Sutherland's name was then withdrawn by his brother-in-law Edward Livingston with the intent to join the supporters of Butler and Sutherland against Tallmadge, but Tallmadge was eventually nominated by a very small majority ("three or four" votes [see Hammond, pg. 432]) Nevertheless, some of the Jacksonian Democrats voted for Butler.

Francis Granger, the defeated gubernatorial candidate of the last State election was the candidate of the Anti-Masons and National Republicans.

== Election ==
When Tallmadge's name was brought forward in the Legislature, members of the opposition, among them Isaac L. Varian and John C. Spencer, objected, arguing that Tallmadge as a State Senator was constitutionally ineligible. The State Constitution of 1821 provided in § 10 that "no member of the Legislature shall receive any civil appointment ... from the Legislature, during the term for which he shall have been elected," which supports this point of view. On the other side, § 11 provided that "if any person shall, while a member of the legislature, be elected to Congress ... his acceptance thereof shall vacate his seat," which considers the possibility of such an election. The majority decided that Tallmadge was eligible. However, a large minority of State legislators insisted that Tallmadge was ineligible, § 11 applying only to U.S. Representatives elected by popular vote, and refused to vote.

== Result ==
Nathaniel P. Tallmadge received majorities in both the Assembly and the Senate, and was declared elected. Due to the controversy about his eligibility, he received only very small majorities - one more than necessary in the Senate, and four more than necessary in the Assembly - although his party had large majorities in both houses of the Legislature.

1833 United States Senator election result
Office	House	Jacksonian Democrat		Anti-Mason/National Republican		Jacksonian Democrat	
U.S. Senator	State Senate (32 members)	Nathaniel P. Tallmadge	18	Francis Granger	6	Benjamin F. Butler	2
	State Assembly (128 members)	Nathaniel P. Tallmadge	69	Francis Granger	25	Benjamin F. Butler	12

== Aftermath ==
Tallmadge served a full term (1833–1839), but faced another controversy when running for re-election. In 1839, no choice was made and the seat became vacant. In 1840, Tallmadge was re-elected and served until June 17, 1844, when he resigned to become Governor of the Territory of Wisconsin.

== Sources ==
- The New York Civil List compiled in 1858 (see: pg. 63 for U.S. Senators; pg. 129 for State Senators 1833; pg. 213f for Members of Assembly 1833)
- Members of the 23rd United States Congress
- History of Political Parties in the State of New-York, Vol. II by Jabez Delano Hammond (State election, 1832: pg. 424; Speaker election, 1833: pg. 430; U.S. Senate election, 1833: pg. 432f)
