= Albany Regency =

Group of American politicians

The Albany Regency was a group of politicians who controlled the New York state government between 1822 and 1838. Originally called the "Holy Alliance", it was instituted by Martin Van Buren, who remained its dominating spirit for many years. The group was among the first American political machines. In the beginning they were the leading figures of the Bucktails faction of the Democratic-Republican Party, later the Jacksonian Democrats, and finally the Hunkers faction of the Democratic Party.

== History ==
The Albany Regency was a loosely organized group of politicians with similar views and goals who resided in or near Albany, New York, the state capital. They controlled the nominating conventions and patronage of their party within New York State, and by dictating its general policy, exerted a powerful influence in national as well as state politics. They derived their power largely from their personal influence and political sagacity, and were, for the most part, earnest opponents of political corruption, though they uniformly acted upon the principle, first formulated in 1833 by one of their number (William L. Marcy), that "to the victors belong the spoils."

The Regency developed party discipline and originated the control of party conventions through officeholders and others subservient to it. The spoils system they had created would dominate late-19th-century American politics, but in the beginning, observed the technical qualifications of the candidates for office they nominated. Thurlow Weed, who coined the name "Albany Regency", wrote he "had never known a body of men who possessed so much power and used it so well". However, this also may have been intended by Weed to be a disparaging remark.

The leading figure of the Albany Regency was Martin Van Buren. Upon Van Buren's election to the United States Senate in 1821, several of his friends and aides, including Benjamin F. Butler, Samuel A. Talcott, Silas Wright, William L. Marcy, and Azariah C. Flagg, took over the day-to-day management of the political organization that had been developed under Van Buren. Roger Skinner, state printer Edwin Croswell, Benjamin Knower, John Adams Dix, and Charles E. Dudley also became members of the Regency. Their organ was the Argus newspaper of Albany, founded in 1813 by Jesse Buel (1778–1839) and edited from 1824 to 1854 by Edwin Croswell. The Regency was powerful enough during this era that it largely dictated policy to New York City's Tammany Hall, which served as the Democratic organization of that city.

The Regency ended when Marcy was defeated in the election for Governor of New York by the opposing Whig's candidate William H. Seward in 1838, which led to a radical change in state politics. Also cited as a factor is a bitter factional split in 1848 (see Barnburners) which gave the other party the patronage the Regency used to use against it. The Regency was reduced in a few years to unorganized individuals.

In 1845 Mackenzie published private letters between Jesse Hoyt and various members of the Albany Regency. These letters described negotiations between various members of the Regency for financial transactions and appointments to government office and exposed how members of the Regency were able to profit from speculatory notes and political corruption.

== See also ==
- Tammany Hall
- Harlem Clubhouse

== Sources ==
- Schlesinger, Arthur M., Jr. The Age of Jackson. Boston : Little, Brown, 1953 [1945].
- "New York History (Book 12, Chapter 6, Part 3)". usgennet.org. Archived from the original on 2007-09-30.
- "New York History (Book 12, Chapter 6, Footnotes)". usgennet.org. Archived from the original on 2007-09-30.
- Ward, John William 1955. Andrew Jackson, Symbol for an Age. New York: Oxford University Press.
