= John Tracy (New York politician) =

American judge and politician (1783–1864)

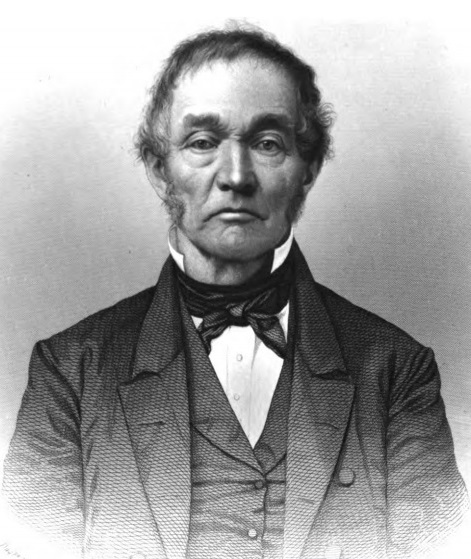

Lieutenant Governor of New York
- In office 1833–1838
- Governor: William L. Marcy
- Preceded by: Edward Philip Livingston
- Succeeded by: Luther Bradish

Personal details
- Born: October 26, 1783 Franklin, Connecticut
- Died: June 18, 1864 (aged 80) Oxford, New York, US
- Party: Democratic-Republican; Democratic
- Spouse: Susan Hyde
- Profession: Attorney

John Tracy (October 26, 1783 in Franklin, Connecticut – June 18, 1864 in Oxford, New York) was an American lawyer and politician who served as the lieutenant governor of New York from 1833 to 1838.

== Life ==
At the beginning of the 19th century he moved to Columbus, New York. In 1805 he moved to Oxford, where he served as deputy county clerk under his relative Uri Tracy. He studied law with Stephen O. Runyan, was admitted to the bar in 1808, and practiced in Oxford. He married Susan Hyde in Franklin, Connecticut, on August 30, 1813.

Tracy was active in politics, first as a Democratic-Republican, and later as a Democrat. In 1815, he was appointed Surrogate of Chenango County, a post he held four years. He was elected to the New York State Assembly in 1820, and returned in 1821, 1822 and 1826.

In 1821 he was re-appointed surrogate, and in 1823 he became First Judge of the Court of Common Pleas, and he served until resigning in 1833. In 1830 the state legislature elected Tracy as a regent of the University of the State of New York, and he served until 1833.

From 1833 to 1838, he was Lieutenant Governor under Governor William L. Marcy. In 1846 he was a delegate to the New York State Constitutional Convention, and was chosen its president. After this convention, Tracy withdrew from politics and government.

For many years Tracy was president of the Oxford Academy board of trustees.

He died in Oxford, New York on June 18, 1864, and was buried at the Riverview Cemetery in Oxford.

His great-great-granddaughter Tracy Dickinson Mygatt was a Socialist playwright and pacifist.

== Sources ==
Political offices
Preceded by Edward Philip Livingston	Lieutenant Governor of New York; 1833–1838	Succeeded by Luther Bradish
