= Charles E. Dudley =

American politician

Charles Dudley
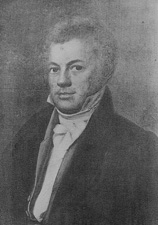

United States Senator from New York
- In office January 15, 1829 – March 3, 1833
- Preceded by: Martin Van Buren
- Succeeded by: Nathaniel P. Tallmadge

Mayor of Albany, New York
- In office 1828–1829
- Preceded by: James Stevenson
- Succeeded by: John Townsend

Member of the New York State Senate
- In office 1820–1825

Mayor of Albany, New York
- In office 1821–1824
- Preceded by: Philip S. Van Rensselaer
- Succeeded by: Ambrose Spencer

Personal details
- Born: May 23, 1780 Johnson Hall, Eccleshall, Staffordshire, England
- Died: January 23, 1841 (aged 60) Albany, New York
- Resting place: Albany Rural Cemetery, Section 61, Lot 1
- Party: Democratic-Republican; Democratic
- Spouse: Blandina Bleecker
- Profession: Merchant

Charles Edward Dudley (May 23, 1780 – January 23, 1841) was an American businessman and politician. A member of Martin Van Buren's Albany Regency, Dudley served as mayor of Albany, New York, a member of the New York State Senate, and a U.S. senator.

== Early life ==
Dudley was born at Johnson Hall, Eccleshall, Staffordshire during the American Revolution to Loyalist parents. His father, Charles Dudley, was an Englishman who had served as Collector of the King's Customs at Newport, Rhode Island, where he married Catherine Cooke, of a Rhode Island colonial family. His paternal grandparents were Thomas Dudley and Mary (née Levett) Dudley of Staffordshire, England.

In November 1775, his father had abandoned his office at Newport and sought refuge on board a British ship of war. The following year, he took up residence in England, where his wife joined him. The family remained in England until his father's death in 1790. In 1795, Dudley's mother returned to Rhode Island, bringing with her the fifteen-year-old youth, who was schooled in Newport.

== Career ==
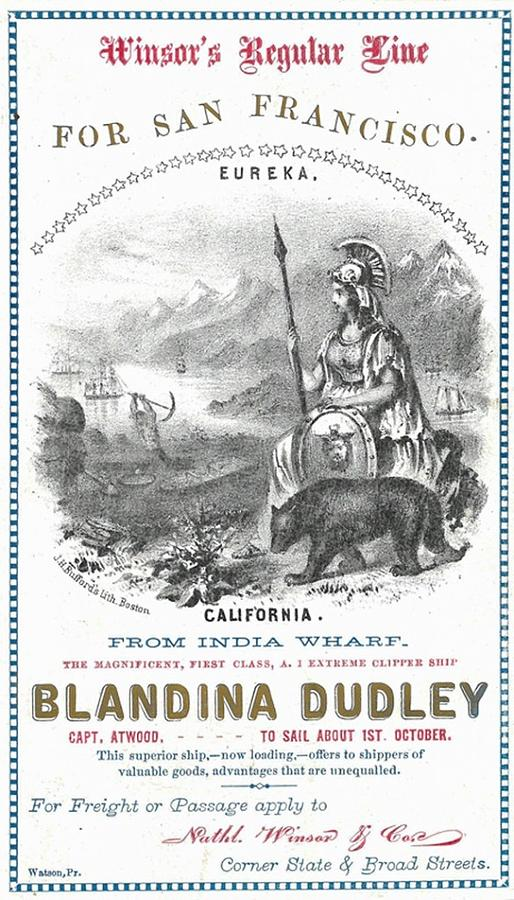
Clipper ship sailing card for a ship named for his wife, Blandina

Near the beginning of the nineteenth century, Dudley worked as a clerk in a counting room and made voyages from New York to the East Indies as a supercargo. He later moved to Albany, New York, where he engaged in the mercantile business and married into a prominent political Albany family.

=== Political career ===
Dudley entered public life when he was in his late thirties. He joined the Albany Regency, the coterie which Martin Van Buren formed to lead the Bucktails, the group which fought DeWitt Clinton for control of New York's Democratic-Republican Party.

Dudley was a presidential elector in the election of 1816 and voted for James Monroe and Daniel D. Tompkins. He served as an Albany alderman from 1819 to 1820. He was mayor from 1821 to 1824, and a member of the New York State Senate from 1820 to 1825. He was mayor again from 1828 to 1829.

=== U.S. Senator ===
Dudley was an unsuccessful candidate for the United States House of Representatives in 1828. When Van Buren resigned his seat in the United States Senate to become Governor of New York in 1829, Dudley was elected to fill the vacancy.

Dudley took his seat on January 15, 1829, and remained in office until the end of his term on March 3, 1833. He was an early example of the businessman in the Senate, where he played an inconspicuous role, but loyally supported the Jackson administration.

=== Later life ===
Dudley retired at the end of his term and spent the rest of his life in Albany, retaining his interest in politics as Jackson, Van Buren and others worked to form the Democratic Party after the Democratic-Republicans split in 1824, depending on which presidential candidate they supported.

== Personal life ==
Dudley married Blandina Bleecker (1783–1863), a member of a prominent Albany family. Blandina was a daughter of Rutger Bleecker (a grandson of mayor Rutger Jansen Bleecker) and Catharine (née Elmendorf) Bleecker.

Dudley died in Albany on January 23, 1841. He was buried at Albany Rural Cemetery.

=== Legacy ===
Dudley was an amateur astronomer. In 1856, his widow provided funds for an observatory in Albany, the Dudley Observatory, which was named for her husband.

== See also ==
- History of Albany, New York
- List of United States senators born outside the United States

U.S. Senate
Preceded by Martin Van Buren	U.S. senator (Class 1) from New York; 1829–1833; Served alongside: Nathan Sanford, William L. Marcy, Silas Wright, Jr.	Succeeded by Nathaniel P. Tallmadge
