= 1852 New York gubernatorial election =

- November 2, 1852
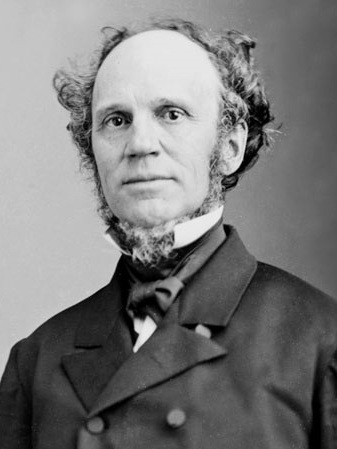

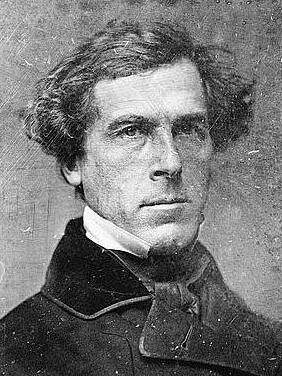
Nominee	Horatio Seymour	Washington Hunt
Party	Democratic	Whig
Popular vote	264,121	241,525
Percentage	50.31%	46.01%
- Results by county Seymour: 40–50% 50–60% 60–70% 70–80% Hunt: 40–50% 50–60%
Governor before election
Washington Hunt
Whig
Elected Governor
Horatio Seymour
Democratic

The 1852 New York gubernatorial election was held on November 2, 1852. Incumbent Governor Washington Hunt ran for re-election to a second term in office. In a rematch of the 1850 race, Hunt was defeated by Horatio Seymour, who was elected to the first of two non-consecutive terms as governor.

== Democratic nomination ==
=== Candidates ===
- John P. Beekman, former State Senator from Kinderhook
- George W. Clinton, former mayor of Buffalo and U.S. Attorney for the Northern District of New York
- Erastus Corning, former State Senator and mayor of Albany
- Zadock Pratt, former U.S. Representative from Prattsville and candidate for governor in 1848
- Augustus Schell, attorney and railroad investor
- Horatio Seymour, former Speaker of the New York Assembly and mayor of Utica and nominee for governor in 1850
- John Vanderbilt, State Senator from Flatbush
- Aaron Ward, former U.S. Representative from Mount Pleasant

=== Results ===
The Democratic state convention met on September 1 and 2 in Syracuse. On the first ballot, Seymour led with 59 votes, but was five short of a majority. Seymour was nominated for governor on the second ballot with 78 votes against 21 for Schell.

1852 Democratic state convention, first ballot
Party	Candidate	Votes	%
Democratic	Horatio Seymour	59	46.46%
Democratic	Zadock Pratt	8	6.30%
Democratic	George W. Clinton	8	6.30%
Democratic	John P. Beekman	7	5.51%
Democratic	Augustus Schell		
Democratic	John Vanderbilt		
Democratic	Erastus Corning		
Democratic	Aaron Ward		
Total votes		127	100.00%

1852 Democratic state convention, second ballot
Party	Candidate	Votes	%
Democratic	Horatio Seymour	78	
Democratic	Augustus Schell	21	
Democratic	Erastus Corning	9	
Democratic	George W. Clinton	3	
Democratic	John P. Beekman		
Democratic	John Vanderbilt		
Democratic	Aaron Ward		
Total votes			

== Whig nomination ==
The Whig state convention met on September 22 at the City Hall in Syracuse. Governor Hunt was re-nominated by acclamation.

== Free Democratic nomination ==
The Free Democratic state convention met on September 29 in Syracuse and passed a series of strong free soil resolutions. They nominated Minthorne Tompkins for governor.

== General election ==
=== Candidates ===
- Washington Hunt, incumbent Governor since 1851 (Whig)
- Horatio Seymour, former Speaker of the New York Assembly and mayor of Utica (Democratic)
- Minthorne Tompkins, former State Senator from Castleton, Staten Island and son of Daniel D. Tompkins (Free Democratic)

=== Results ===
1852 New York gubernatorial election
Party	Candidate	Votes	%	±%
Democratic	Horatio Seymour	264,121	50.31%	▲0.73
Whig	Washington Hunt (incumbent)	214,614	46.01%	▼1.54
Free Soil	Minthorne Tompkins	19,661	3.94%	N/A
Total votes		498,396	100.00%	

== See also ==
- New York gubernatorial elections
- New York state elections
