= Jehiel H. Halsey =

American politician (1788–1867)

Member of the U.S. House of Representatives from New York's 26th district
- In office March 4, 1829 – March 3, 1831 Serving with Robert S. Rose
- Preceded by: John Maynard; Dudley Marvin
- Succeeded by: John Dickson; William Babcock

Personal details
- Born: Jehiel Howell Halsey; October 7, 1788 Southampton, New York, U.S.
- Died: December 5, 1867 (aged 79) Lodi, New York, U.S.
- Resting place: West Lodi Cemetery
- Party: Jacksonian
- Relatives: Nicoll Halsey (brother)

Jehiel Howell Halsey (October 7, 1788 – December 5, 1867) was an American lawyer and politician from New York. From 1829 to 1831, he served one term in the U.S. House of Representatives.

== Early life and education ==
He was the son of Congressman Silas Halsey. Halsey moved to Herkimer County in 1793 with his parents, and settled in what is now the town of Lodi in Seneca County. He attended the common schools.

== Political career ==
He engaged in agricultural pursuits. He was County Clerk of Seneca County from 1819 to 1821.

=== Congress ===
Halsey was elected as a Jacksonian to the 21st United States Congress, holding office from March 4, 1829, to March 3, 1831. He was Chairman of the Committee on Accounts.

=== Later career ===
He was member of the New York State Senate (7th D.) from 1832 to 1835, sitting in the 55th through 58th New York State Legislatures.

He was Surrogate of Seneca County from 1837 to 1843, and Town Supervisor of Lodi from 1845 to 1846.

=== Death ===
He died on December 5, 1868, and was buried at the West Lodi Cemetery.

=== Family ===
Congressman Nicoll Halsey was his brother.

U.S. House of Representatives
Preceded by John Maynard, Dudley Marvin	Member of the U.S. House of Representatives from New York's 26th congressional district 1829–1831 with Robert S. Rose	Succeeded by John Dickson, William Babcock
New York State Senate
Preceded by George B. Throop	New York State Senate; Seventh District (Class 1); 1832–1835	Succeeded by John Beardsley
