= Mary Dickson =

Mary Dickson may refer to:

- Mary Bernard Dickson (c. 1811–1895), English-born New Zealand nun, nurse, and teacher
- Mary Hannah Dickson, birth name of May Brahe (1884–1956), Australian composer
- Mary Dickson Nelson, American wife of circuit judge David Aldrich Nelson

== See also ==
- John and Mary Dickson House, American historic home
