= Senator Beekman =

Senator Beekman may refer to:

- James William Beekman (1815–1877), New York State Senate
- John P. Beekman (1788–1861), New York State Senate
