= 2020 New York's 22nd congressional district election =

- November 3, 2020

New York's 22nd congressional district
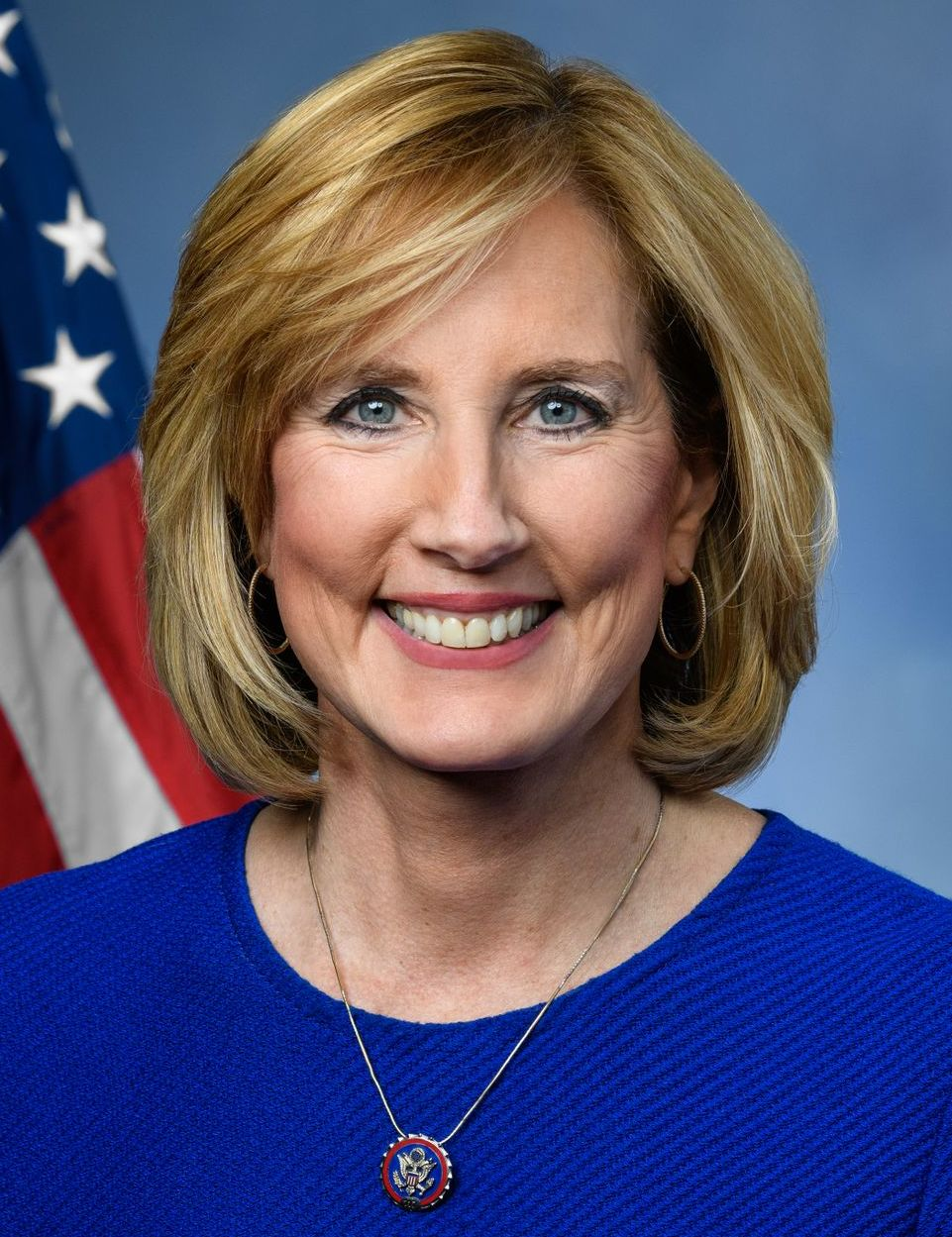

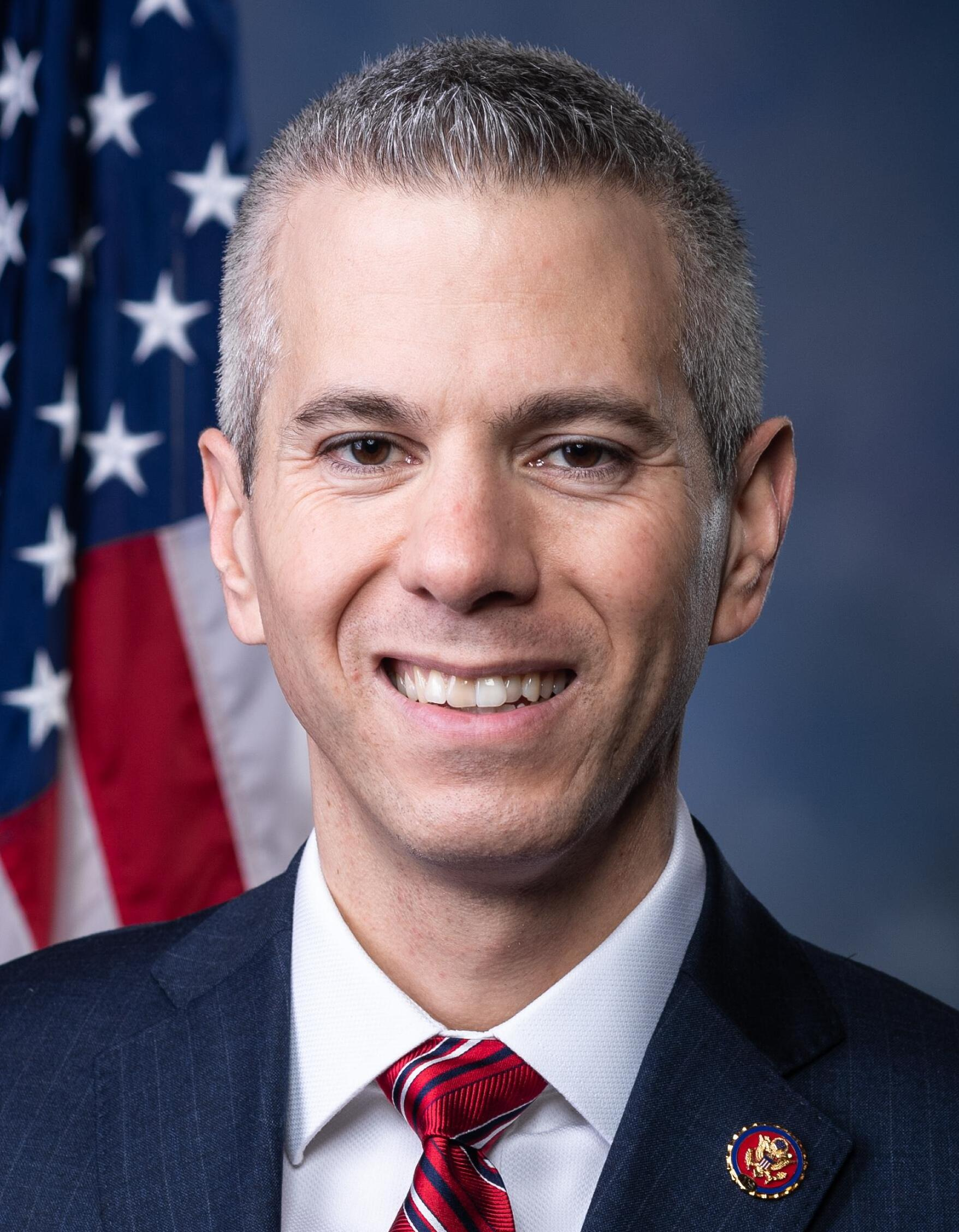
Nominee	Claudia Tenney	Anthony Brindisi
Party	Republican	Democratic
Alliance	Conservative	Working Families; Independence
Popular vote	156,098	155,989
Percentage	47.80%	47.77%
- County results Tenney: 50–60% 60–70% Brindisi: 50–60%
U.S. Representative before election
Anthony Brindisi
Democratic
Elected U.S. Representative
Claudia Tenney
Republican

The 2020 election in New York's 22nd congressional district was part of the 2020 United States House of Representatives elections in the state. The major-party candidates were Democratic incumbent Anthony Brindisi and Republican Claudia Tenney, with a third-party candidate, Libertarian Keith Price, also participating. In the 2018 House race in this district, Brindisi unseated the freshman incumbent Tenney by a margin of less than 1 percent. The rematch was expected to be just as competitive.

The COVID-19 pandemic forced the candidates to adjust their campaign activities, holding many via videoconference. Due to the pandemic, New York State allowed any voter in the 2020 primaries and general election to request an absentee ballot and vote by mail: pandemic precautions also slowed poll operations and canvassing. At the close of polls on November 3, Tenney led by 28,000 votes, but up to 70,000 absentee ballots remained to be returned. As the absentee ballots were counted, Tenney's lead shrank to around 100 votes by November 20.

Errors by boards of elections in the district came to light in late November. Many of the boards were found to have marked disputed ballots in a way inconsistent with state election law. The Oneida County Board of Elections used sticky notes to mark disputed ballots, and those notes came unstuck from the ballots and attached themselves to other ballots, an incident called "Stickygate" by the media. Oneida County was later revealed to have made two more serious errors: it incorrectly rejected 700 absentee ballots that should have been accepted under state election law, and failed to process 2,418 voter registration applications before Election Day. The other county Boards of Elections were also found to have made errors affecting dozens of ballots. In two separate instances, Chenango County misplaced absentee ballots and found them later.

After a partial recount of contested ballots, Tenney was declared the winner on February 5 by 109 votes, or 0.03 percent of the vote. Brindisi conceded three days later, and Tenney was sworn in on February 11, a month after the start of the 117th Congress and 100 days after Election Day.

Both commissioners of the Oneida County Board of Elections were forced to resign. The federal Department of Justice later sued the county over its errors. Despite the multiple errors, no evidence of voter fraud was found in court; instead, the errors seemed to result from incompetence. Donald Trump and many of his allies saw this race as a case of attempted voter fraud and connected it to Trump's false claims of voter fraud in the 2020 presidential election. Republicans also pointed to recent changes in election law that stressed the state's electoral system and may have caused the errors. Legislators and activists of various political alignments proposed reforms in response to the events of this election.

== Background ==
From 2013 to 2023, New York's 22nd congressional district stretched from the eastern end of Lake Ontario to the Pennsylvania border. It contained rural and urban areas, including the cities of Utica, Rome, Cortland, and Binghamton, the entirety of the counties of Chenango, Cortland, Madison, and Oneida Counties, and parts of the counties of Broome, Herkimer, Oswego, and Tioga. At the time of the election it had a Cook Partisan Voting Index of R+6, indicating that it leaned slightly Republican. Republican Richard L. Hanna held the district until his retirement in 2017, after which it began to be considered a swing district.

Claudia Tenney, a resident of the Utica suburb New Hartford, won the 2016 House race with 44 percent of the vote, beating Democrat Kim Myers and independent candidate Martin Babinec. In that year's presidential race, Trump won the district by a 15% margin. Tenney aligned herself with Trump during her campaign, and in her freshman term made herself known as a close ally of his. In early 2018 she made two controversial public statements. Speaking about the Stoneman Douglas High School shooting, she said "so many of these people that commit the mass murders end up being Democrats". Later, she blamed the "deep state" for the Ben Carson office furnishing scandal. Although national media reported on these statements, and late-night talk shows mocked her for them, her Republican base's enthusiasm was unaffected.

The Democratic Party nominated Anthony Brindisi, a resident of Utica, to run against Tenney in the 2018 race. Brindisi, like Tenney, was a member of the New York State Assembly before running for the House. This race was predicted to be very close: it was noted as vulnerable by both the Democratic and National Republican Congressional Committee, and Politico included it in their top 10 House races. After a few weeks' delay to count absentee ballots, Brindisi was announced the winner by 0.9 percent of the vote. This win was part of a nationwide "blue wave" of Democratic success in the 2018 United States elections, and this district was the most Republican district to flip in 2018. In the House, Brindisi co-chaired the Blue Dog Coalition and was a member of the bipartisan Problem Solvers Caucus.

On September 30, 2019, Tenney announced her candidacy for the 2020 race, setting up a rematch with Brindisi. The race was expected to once again be highly competitive.

== Primaries ==
Brindisi did not face a primary challenge. Libertarian candidate Keith Price was unopposed for his party's nomination.

=== Republican primary ===
With two years of congressional experience and an endorsement from Trump, Tenney was the front-runner in the primary over her opponent George Phillips. Tenney faced criticism from Phillips for the attention she attracted for her controversial statements in 2018, her defeat in 2018, and her refusal to participate in primary debates. Phillips and Tenney had previously faced off in the 2016 primary, in which Phillips came in third.

Due to the COVID-19 pandemic, Governor Andrew Cuomo issued an executive order allowing vote by mail for any voter who wished to do so. Postage-paid absentee ballots were mailed automatically to any registered voter who was eligible to vote in a contested primary. New York's primary election night was June 23, postponed from its usual date. Calling back to the 2018 race and foreshadowing the general election to come, absentee ballots ate away some of Tenney's lead after election night. Still, she won handily, by a margin of 19.2% over Phillips. He conceded the next day. This primary did not experience the problems of other primaries in the state that year, many of which did not return results until more than a month later.

==== Candidates ====
===== Nominee =====
- Claudia Tenney, former U.S. representative for New York's 22nd congressional district from 2016 to 2018

==== Eliminated in primary ====
- George Phillips, teacher, former Broome County legislator, and nominee for New York's 22nd congressional district in 2008 and 2010

==== Withdrawn ====
- Steve Cornwell, Broome County district attorney
- Franklin Sager, teacher

===== Declined =====
- Richard C. David, mayor of Binghamton

==== Primary results ====
Republican primary results
Party	Candidate	Votes	%
Republican	Claudia Tenney	23,784	59.6
Republican	George Phillips	16,151	40.4
Total votes		39,935	100.0

== Campaign ==
Predictions
Source	Ranking	As of
Niskanen Center	Lean D	July 26, 2020
Inside Elections	Tilt D	October 28, 2020
RealClearPolitics	Tossup	November 2, 2020
Sabato's Crystal Ball	Lean D	November 2, 2020
The Cook Political Report	Tossup D	November 2, 2020
Politico	Tossup	November 2, 2020
FiveThirtyEight	Lean D	November 3, 2020

Brindisi was initially skeptical of efforts to impeach Trump, calling them divisive, and recommended censure instead. However, he eventually supported the impeachment inquiry and voted in favor of Trump's first impeachment. Republican-aligned groups had been running ads in the district targeting Brindisi and the Democratic Party during the impeachment inquiry, and these ads intensified after Brindisi's vote. The Brindisi campaign began running ads at the end of January. Despite this campaign activity, Brindisi did not formally launch his campaign until February 24.

Normal campaign activities were disrupted by the COVID-19 pandemic, starting in March. New York state government responses to the pandemic such as stay-at-home orders and bans on large gatherings halted canvassing and campaign events. Fundraising became difficult during March and April due to the COVID-19 recession. Campaigns found themselves suddenly changing their strategy due the crisis. Shortly following lockdown in his district, Brindisi self-quarantined after fellow Blue Dog Ben McAdams tested positive. However, he did not contract COVID-19 himself. The new crisis largely knocked Trump's impeachment out of the conversation, replaced by healthcare, unemployment, and revenue loss. In the months that followed, Democratic campaigns deemphasized canvassing in favor of COVID-19-safe virtual campaigning while Republican campaigns continued in-person canvassing, which may have put Democrats at a disadvantage.

In response to the George Floyd protests, both candidates expressed support for the police. Brindisi cosponsored a bill called the "Defund Cities that Defund the Police Act", which died in committee. He also ran campaign ads where he appeared with the Oneida County Sheriff. The Tenney campaign ran an ad criticizing Brindisi's attendance of a June rally for George Floyd. Tenney received endorsements from several police unions in the state and district, who generally supported Republicans in this election cycle.

The presidential race influenced down-ballot campaigning. Brindisi endorsed Biden in the 2020 Democratic Party presidential primaries, incurring criticism from the Tenney campaign. Donald Trump Jr. appeared at a virtual event for Tenney in June. Joint events to support Trump and Tenney were held by local supporters in Central New York.

As of the end of September, the Brindisi campaign had raised a total of $5.2 million, and the Tenney campaign had raised $1.9 million. Spending for both candidates was dwarfed by outside spending: OpenSecrets ranked the race 4th in the nation for spending by outside groups. Those groups spent $10.4 million on ads against Brindisi and $7.3 million on ads against Tenney, with ads supporting either candidate amounting to less than a million each. The National Republican Congressional Committee spent $3.3 million on ads in the district, and the Congressional Leadership Fund spent $2.2 million. According to the Wesleyan Media Project, more campaign ads had been shown in the district than any other House district in the country that year.

In October, the race appeared on NPR and Roll Call's lists of top ten House races.

=== Endorsements ===
Anthony Brindisi (Democrat)

Organizations

- Blue Dog Coalition
- End Citizens United
- League of Conservation Voters Action Fund
- NARAL Pro-Choice America
- New Democrat Coalition
- Planned Parenthood Action Fund
- Sierra Club
- United States Chamber of Commerce

Labor unions

- Communications Workers of America District 1 and Local 1126
- New York State AFL–CIO
- New York State Nurses Association
- New York State United Teachers
- Police Benevolent Association of New York State Law Enforcement (representing state university police, park police, Department of Environmental Conservation police, and forest rangers)

Newspapers

- The Post-Standard
Claudia Tenney (Republican)

Federal politicians

- Newt Gingrich, former U.S. representative (GA-6) and Speaker of the House
- Kevin McCarthy, House Minority Leader, U.S. representative (CA-23)
- Steve Scalise, House Minority Whip, U.S. representative (LA-1)
- Elise Stefanik, U.S. representative (NY-21)
- Donald Trump, 45th president of the United States

State officials

- Mike Huckabee, former governor of Arkansas
- George Pataki, former governor of New York (1995–2006)

Individuals

- Rudy Giuliani, former mayor of New York City
- Matt Roberts, co-founder of Sherrill Manufacturing in Sherrill, New York

Organizations

- Citizens United
- Elevate PAC
- NRA Political Victory Fund
- Susan B. Anthony List

Labor unions

- New York Police Department Sergeants' Benevolent Association
- New York State Police Investigators Association
- New York State Troopers PBA
- United Mine Workers of America Local 717 (representing Remington Arms employees in Ilion, New York)

=== Polling ===
Poll source	Dates administered	Sample size	Margin of error	Anthony Brindisi (D)	Claudia Tenney (R)	Keith Price (L)	Undecided
Siena College	September 27 – October 4, 2020	383 likely voters	± 5%	48%	39%	4%	9%

=== Debates ===
Due to COVID-19 precautions, there were no in-person audiences for these debates. Tenney and Brindisi also debated privately at a virtual editorial board meeting of The Post-Standard on October 9, before it issued its editorial endorsements.

Debates
Date	Held by	Participants	Venue
October 19	Spectrum News	Tenney & Brindisi	Virtual
October 22	WSKG & League of Women Voters	Tenney, Brindisi, & Price	WSKG studios, Vestal
October 26	WBGH, WSYR-TV, & WUTR	Tenney & Brindisi	Schafer Theater, Mohawk Valley Community College, Utica

== General election ==
The COVID-19 pandemic complicated election administration. Bills passed in August allowed any voter in New York to request an absentee ballot and vote by mail in the general election. After an unusual number of ballots were rejected across the state in the June primaries, New York also added provisions for voters to correct, or "cure", rejected absentee ballots. Donald Trump vocally opposed efforts to expand voting by mail, which caused some Republican voters to distrust absentee ballots. Some voters in the state received robocalls with disinformation that mail-in ballots could be used to track down voters for arrest warrants, debt collection, or compulsory vaccination. Aside from concerns about voting by mail, more than half of poll workers from previous elections in New York State were over the age of 60 and vulnerable to COVID-19. Many chose not to work the 2020 general election, creating a shortage of poll workers.

Margin over time
Date	Margin	Ref
11/3/2020	28,422 R	
11/12/2020	21,094 R	
11/13/2020	16,720 R	
11/14/2020	10,294 R	
11/16/2020	7,189 R	
11/17/2020	5,183 R	
11/17/2020	3,576 R	
11/18/2020	2,153 R	
11/19/2020	206 R	
11/20/2020	100 R	
11/25/2020	12–13 D	
11/30/2020	12 R	
12/18/2020	19 R	
12/22/2020	3–5 ?	
12/24/2020	14 D	
12/29/2020	30 R	
12/30/2020	29 R	
1/29/2021	122 R	
2/5/2021	109 R	

Early voting ran from October 24 to November 1, ending two days before Election Day. The House election shared the ballot with the presidential race, state assembly and senate races, and local races; New York did not have a federal senate race that year. After the polls closed, Tenney led Brindisi by around 28,000 votes, but more than 70,000 absentee ballots had been mailed to voters, and only 45,000 of those had been returned at the time. By state law, any absentee ballot postmarked by Election Day and received by November 10 would be counted. Broome County stated that they received 19,000 absentee ballots, of which 300–350 needed to be cured: the process of determining which ballots needed to be cured took a day in prior elections, but due to the volume of absentee ballots in this race it took three days. In addition, the government offices of Chenango County were recovering from a ransomware attack. While the Chenango County Board of Elections said that the attack was not election-related and would not affect voting, it did delay tabulation and reporting.

Tenney and Brindisi both filed suit for judicial oversight of the absentee ballot count. The request came before New York Supreme Court Justice Scott DelConte in Oswego. Justice DelConte allowed the absentee ballot count to begin on the 10th under the court's supervision. Democratic voters were more likely to vote by mail than Republican voters, so as absentee ballots were counted, Tenney's lead evaporated. By the 20th, Tenney's lead had shrunk to around 100 votes. Justice DelConte ordered the counties to provide final vote totals and disputed ballots by November 23.

=== Errors ===
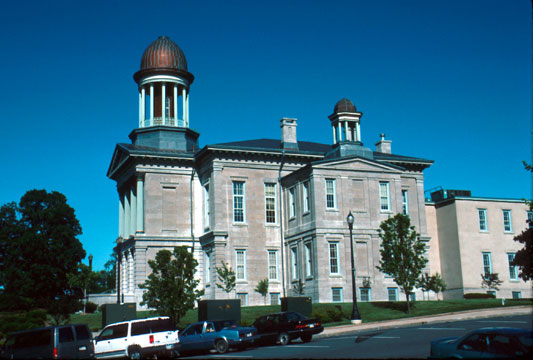
Court sessions took place using videoconferencing and at the Oswego County Courthouse.

Problems began to come to light starting on November 23. New York election law states disputed ballots should be marked in ink on the back of the ballot. However, several counties marked disputed ballots differently than stated by law. Oswego and Oneida County instead applied a color-coded sticky note to each disputed ballot. When Oneida County transported the ballots to the courtroom, some notes came unstuck from their ballot. Some ballots had no note, one had a clearly incorrect note, and one had two notes. Fewer than 200 ballots were affected. When Justice DelConte asked the Oneida County commissioners how to determine which ballots were counted or contested, they admitted it was now impossible, which the judge called "a serious problem." The Madison County Board of Elections used a spreadsheet to store information on disputed ballots instead of marking them, but the judge was unable to match the ballots with the spreadsheet. Justice DelConte ordered a recess until after the Thanksgiving holiday break. In addition to the errors discovered, three voters from Madison County were found to have legally submitted their absentee ballots but then died before Election Day: under New York election law, these were rejected.

Anticipating a lengthy legal process, Brindisi retained Perkins Coie, often regarded as the premier Democratic election law firm. Later Marc Elias, chief counsel for many high-profile Democratic campaigns and recounts, would join Brindisi's legal team.

Based on ballot totals submitted to the court on November 24, Brindisi appeared to have taken the lead by a margin of 12 or 13 votes. A week later Herkimer County corrected a tabulation error in its totals, which gave Tenney a margin of 12 votes. Justice DelConte and Brindisi's legal team expressed concern about this sudden discovery and how it was announced. On December 1, Chenango County stated in court that it had discovered 55 unopened absentee ballots that appeared to have been mislaid. Of those, 11 were from non-registered voters and rejected. The Twitter account for House Judiciary committee Republicans drew attention to this discovery, calling it "fishy". Tenney retweeted them and added that "dead people" and "ballots sent from NYC" were being included, a claim that was not substantiated in court.

At the beginning of December, the focus narrowed to 809 disputed absentee and affidavit ballots. Tenney's counsel moved to conclude the legal proceedings and declare her the winner, arguing that the records and documentation of the initial canvass were inadequate for the judge to make any rulings on those ballots. Brindisi's counsel argued that the judge had broad powers to order a limited recanvass, and asked for the disputed ballots to be reviewed "in a public hearing with watchers present" in order to create a uniform record. Brindisi's counsel also asked for the unopened Chenango County ballots to be included in that hearing. Justice DelConte was critical of both arguments, saying that Tenney's lawyers were proposing to accept results known to be inaccurate, and Brindisi's lawyers were asking for a recount restricted to those areas where he was likely to gain votes. Further complicating matters, an Oneida County election worker tested positive for COVID-19, and was likely to have exposed the rest of the office. While much of the proceedings were being conducted via Zoom videoconferencing, this limited the office's capacity to perform a recount.

On December 8, DelConte ordered a recount of the disputed absentee and affidavit ballots in all counties. In total, more than 2,600 ballots were subject to the recount, most of them affidavit ballots. Oneida County alone rejected 1,500 affidavit ballots: the Brindisi campaign held that 700 of those were valid because the voters were registered at other addresses or did not fill out a part of the affidavit ballot that could be easily verified. The Oneida County commissioners admitted that they did not follow a 2019 "registration portability" law that provided for a voter's registration to move with them if they move within New York State, even between different counties. These votes were eventually included in the count.

The recount process was painstaking, examining individual ballots closely. One ballot received attention due to a stain that may have been either blood or chocolate. Tenney's lawyers claimed that if it was blood the ballot was traceable to the voter via DNA profiling, so it should be disqualified. Brindisi's lawyers countered that nearly every ballot carried the voter's fingerprints. Chenango County found 12 more ballots in an office drawer: Tenney's lead nudged up to 19 after all the mislaid Chenango County ballots were counted. New challenges were raised to 67 Madison County ballots. Justice DelConte called for the counties to wrap it up before the start of the next Congress, but Oneida County's recount proceeded more slowly than expected. As Oneida County's recount progressed, Brindisi briefly gained a 14-vote lead, but Tenney regained a 29-vote margin at the end of the year. A recess was called for the last week of December, although Oneida County continued their recount.

It became clear that the next Congress would start with the seat empty. A bipartisan team from the House came to observe the proceedings. The Trump family had already been drawing parallels between this race and their own post-election lawsuits. Republicans accused Brindisi and Democrats of voter fraud and began a fundraising campaign for what Nick Langworthy, chair of the New York State Republican Committee, referred to as an "emergency legal defense fund". Democrats began a corresponding fundraiser for Brindisi. Trump mentioned the recount in a rally on January 5, implying that the election officials fabricated votes.

Deliberations continued in the new year. A 2020 reform prevents ballots from being rejected due to minor technical violations, as long as they demonstrate "substantial compliance"; the interpretation and scope of that phrase were debated by the Brindisi and Tenney teams. The teams differed on whether to accept affidavit ballots that were left unsealed, or sealed with "I Voted" stickers; due to COVID-19, some voters and poll workers were reluctant to lick envelopes. There was also discussion of voters who missed the deadline to "cure" their ballots; as the change to election law allowing curing was new for that election, the law had not been settled in court yet. Brindisi's team argued in favor of including affidavit ballots that were not signed, ballots from purged voters, and ballots from voters who voted at the wrong polling site, or voted on a ballot with incorrect lower-level races (such as state Senate or state Assembly). This set of arguments from Brindisi's team was considered implausible under New York election law by an election commissioner from neighboring Onondaga County, and met criticism from the judge. Individual ballots continued to be interrogated as well. Brindisi's team estimated that, if each remaining ballot was discussed in court, three weeks or more remained in the proceedings.

The error affecting the largest number of voters came to light in early January, when a clerk from the Oneida County Board of Elections testified that they were unable to process most of a batch of 3,000 voter registration applications received from the state DMV before the election. The clerk said that despite working nights and weekends they were only able to process 640 of them, and pointed to understaffing and COVID-19-related issues. The remainder of the applications, 2,418 in number, were not processed by Election Day. At least 63 such voters filled out affidavit ballots; more may have simply left the polls when they found out. The Oneida County Democratic Commissioner testified that she was unaware of the DMV application backlog until it was revealed in court. Brindisi's team identified ballots from 69 voters and asked for their inclusion, which Tenney's team called "cherry-picking"; instead, DelConte ordered the county to review more than 1,000 affidavit ballots to determine which ones were from voters whose application was not processed on time, and said all such votes would be counted. Brindisi's team filed an appeal to stop this review; it was denied by Appellate Division Justice Patrick NeMoyer in a private hearing, while leaving the possibility for the results of the review to be appealed. Tenney's lead grew to 122 after the review.

On January 29, DelConte's clerk sent a letter to a Tenney campaign volunteer warning her that text messages she was sending to the justice's cell phone appeared to be an attempt to improperly influence him, and to cease immediately. The text messages, sent over a period of about a month, urged him to "STOP LOOKING FOR DEMOCRAT VOTES" and accused him of violating the Constitution. The volunteer had obtained DelConte's private number while she was a delegate for the Conservative Party of New York State and DelConte was seeking their endorsement. DelConte never saw these text messages; they were noticed by his clerk. The volunteer said that she played a minor role in the campaign. FEC records show a $75 payment to her from Tenney's campaign in February 2020 for services as a notary public.

Nearing the end, the judge rejected Brindisi's team's arguments on including purged voters (85 ballots) and voters who voted in the wrong polling place (128 ballots) or left their vote in a drop box in the wrong district (51 votes). However, he ruled in favor of including 92 absentee ballots from Madison County that Brindisi's team argued for, and for including 62 ballots that the Tenney team questioned whether the signature on the ballot matched the signature on record. This reduced Tenney's lead by a few votes but she remained ahead. Brindisi's team asked to halt the certification, arguing that seating Tenney in Congress would render his appeal moot, but the judge rejected that argument.

On February 5, DelConte ruled that Tenney had won the election by 109 votes, and ordered the state to certify the results immediately. Brindisi conceded the election three days later and dropped his appeal. Under the Federal Contested Elections Act, Brindisi had the option to ask the House of Representative to intervene in the 30 days following certification. This would have likely required transporting all ballots to Washington for a recount by the General Accountability Office, and would have taken three months or more. In a statement after conceding, he gave his reasons for not continuing the appeal or taking advantage of the FCEA. He said that he felt more voters in his district were exhausted by the presidential election and Trump's false claims of voter fraud, and did not want to prolong the race any more. Brindisi also spoke about not wanting to seem divisive, and the fact that the House seat would remain vacant until the recount was settled. He did call for an investigation into the election, as did Justice DelConte in his final statement.

==== Summary of errors ====
The court proceedings uncovered a number of violations of election law. The only county to come out blameless was Tioga, only a small portion of which is in the district.

Violations found
County	Violation	Voters affected
Oswego	Improper marking of disputed ballots: used sticky notes instead	6
Oneida	Improper marking of disputed ballots: used sticky notes instead	199 (39 + 160)
Oneida	Improperly rejected affidavit ballots	≈1,500
Herkimer	Counting error	35
Chenango	Ballots misplaced and later discovered	63 (55 + 12)
Madison	Improper marking of disputed ballots: used a spreadsheet	132
Cortland	Candidates not informed of rejected ballots	≈100
Broome	Improper marking of disputed ballots: used a spreadsheet	>300
Oneida	Failure to process voter registrations	2,418

=== Results ===
Results by county: Tenney: 50–60% 60–70% Brindisi: 50–60%

New York's 22nd congressional district, 2020 compared to 2018
Party	Candidate	Votes	%	±%
Republican	Claudia Tenney	143,291	44.83	0.99
Conservative	Claudia Tenney	12,807	4.01	−0.79
Total	Claudia Tenney	156,098	48.84	-0.22
Democratic	Anthony Brindisi	138,898	43.45	−2.72
Working Families	Anthony Brindisi	11,188	3.50	+1.65
Independence	Anthony Brindisi	5,903	1.65	−0.41
Total	Anthony Brindisi (incumbent)	155,989	48.80	−2.04
Libertarian	Keith Price	6,780	2.12	N/A
Write-in		771	0.24	0.14
Margin of victory		109	0.03	−1.75
Total valid votes		319,638		+27.24
Rejected ballots		6,930		+78.24
Turnout		326,568		+28.02
Republican gain from Democratic		Swing	2.04	

By county

County	Claudia Tenney Republican		Anthony Brindisi Democratic		All Others		Margin		Total votes
County	#	%	#	%	#	%	#	%	Total votes
Broome (part)	36,590	40.7%	50,705	56.5%	2,521	2.8%	-14,115	-15.8%	89,816
Chenango	11,922	54.4%	9,319	42.5%	662	3.0%	2,603	11.9%	21,903
Cortland	9,552	43.7%	11,082	50.6%	1,248	5.7%	-1,530	-6.9%	21,882
Herkimer (part)	13,687	56.6%	10,133	41.9%	365	1.5%	3,554	14.7%	24,185
Madison	17,045	51.0%	15,669	46.9%	706	2.1%	1,376	4.1%	33,420
Oneida	50,645	50.1%	48,959	48.5%	1,428	1.4%	1,686	1.6%	101,032
Oswego (part)	13,601	63.4%	7,433	34.6%	425	2.0%	6,168	28.8%	21,459
Tioga (part)	3,056	51.4%	2,689	45.3%	196	3.3%	367	6.1%	5,941
Totals	156,098	48.84%	155,989	48.80%	7,551	2.4%	109	0.04%	319,638

Notes

- New York is an electoral fusion state, where a candidate may run on multiple party lines.
- Tenney was also endorsed by the Reform Party of New York State in 2018, and received about a thousand votes on that party line. The Reform Party lost ballot access after the 2018 election.
- Brindisi was also endorsed by the Women's Equality Party in 2018, and received about 1,300 votes on that party line. The WEP lost ballot access after the 2018 election.
- No third-party candidates ran in the 2018 race.

== Aftermath ==
This election was widely considered a fiasco. The errors may have been even worse than revealed in court: a later review found additional affidavit ballots that may have been rejected improperly. Elias pointed out that many elections may have errors like the ones in this election that go unnoticed because their margins were larger and they are subject to less scrutiny. Head of the state Senate elections committee Zellnor Myrie and Cornell lecturer Dan Lamb observed that if New York were a swing state, the effect of these errors on the presidential election would have been a national scandal. Trump-aligned Republicans saw this election, like the presidential election, as a case of voter fraud. However, no voter fraud was found in the legal proceedings. Other Republicans placed blamed on changes to state election law passed by Democrats, although Judge DelConte disagreed with that being a factor. In his view, the errors in this election were caused by carelessness by the boards of elections, although the State and Oneida County Boards of Elections defended themselves, saying they had been faced with an unprecedented challenge.

Politicians and activists of all political alignments agreed that New York's electoral system needed reform. Tenney described it as "very flawed". Governor Cuomo agreed that the system had flaws, particularly how election commissioners are chosen. Advocates referred to New York's election system as "antiquated" and lacking transparency, and needed to reorient their operations to accommodate higher rates of voting by mail. Like in other states across the country, various election reforms bills were introduced in the legislature. The state branch of Common Cause noted that New York's 58 boards of elections all had different ways of counting and tabulating ballots, and called for a single consistent standard. Others asked for reforms to make it harder for lawyers to raise frivolous challenges to ballots, using the ballot stained with blood or chocolate as an example. The state legislature passed a bill that would require boards of elections to count absentee ballots as they arrive, and eliminated rules that would disqualify ballots with minor technical mistakes. Another bill would let voters track their absentee ballots on a web portal. However, these bills had to compete for attention with other issues in Albany such as COVID-19 and the Andrew Cuomo sexual harassment allegations, so as of August 2021 have not been signed into law. Tenney later formed the House Election Integrity Caucus with co-chair California Representative Mike Garcia, who won his race by only 333 votes. It opposes the For the People Act and other voting laws proposed by Democrats, and promotes laws and efforts to restrict voting and combat voter fraud. The 2021 New York general election included ballot proposals for amendments to the Constitution of New York implementing same-day voter registration and no-excuse absentee voting, but those proposals were not successful.

The 2020 House elections were difficult for Democrats across the country, with many first-term Democrats losing their seats. In a congressional district that went for Trump by a 15% margin in 2016 and 11% in 2020, for the congressional race to end in a near-tie in both 2018 and 2020 was unusual. Despite the loss, Brindisi's margin over the presidential vote in his district was among the top 10 among Democratic House candidates that year.

This was the third consecutive race for Tenney where she did not receive a majority of votes, and the second of those that she won. Eight other races in 2020 did not produce a winner with a majority: Iowa's 2nd, Iowa's 3rd, Minnesota's 1st, Minnesota's 2nd, Nevada's 3rd, Texas's 24th, Utah's 4th, and Washington's 10th congressional districts. The election in Iowa's 2nd district was decided by a smaller margin of only 6 votes. In that race, Rita Hart did not drop her challenge until March 31, 2021, but the provisional winner of that race was seated at the start of Congress, so media sources generally referred to the election for New York's 22nd as the last contested race to be decided from 2020.

=== House vacancy ===
Brindisi's term expired on January 3, at the end of the 116th Congress. Tenney was not sworn into the 117th Congress until February 11. The seat sat vacant in the interim. As is typical for a vacant congressional seat, Brindisi's congressional staff stayed on in a non-partisan capacity reporting to the Clerk of the United States House of Representatives in order to handle constituent calls and manage cases. As a latecomer to Congress, Tenney missed the initial round of committee assignments and an opportunity to sit on the House Appropriations Committee; she was instead assigned to lower-profile committees.

None of the candidates attended the joint session of Congress to certify the Electoral College vote count on January 6, nor were they present during the ensuing Capitol attack. During the attack, Tenney tweeted that "deep concerns over election integrity do not justify violence or property destruction." Brindisi condemned the attack and attributed it to Trump's actions. When asked about the second impeachment of Donald Trump, Brindisi said he would have voted to impeach, while Tenney would not have. Later on, Tenney stated that were she in Congress at the time, she "really would've been torn" on whether to vote to certify the election results, and repeated a claim that many of the rioters were not Trump supporters. She would later vote against the January 6 commission.

=== Oneida County Board of Elections ===
At the beginning of February, the Oneida County Board of Election commissioners—Democrat Carolann Cardone and Republican Rose Grimaldi—were unanimously re-appointed as commissioners by their respective parties. This caused an outcry, since they had been singled out multiple times by the judge during the legal proceedings, and Oneida County was responsible for the most severe errors in the election. Activist organizations had already been calling for Cardone and Grimaldi's resignation; after this reappointment, those organizations were joined by the editorial board of The Post-Standard.

According to state law, county board of election commissioners can only be removed by the governor, therefore, on February 9, Oneida County Executive Anthony Picente, a Republican, sent a letter to Governor Cuomo asking for Cardone and Grimaldi's removal; Brindisi also agreed that the commissioners should be fired. On the 15th, the New York State Board of Elections called on the commissioners to resign: Cardone resigned that day, and Grimaldi followed the next. In her resignation letter, Grimaldi cited "the COVID-19 pandemic, changes in election law, changing executive orders and limited resources" as challenges during the election.

On March 25 the United States Department of Justice notified Oneida County of its intent to sue over violations of the National Voter Registration Act (NVRA) and the Help America Vote Act (HAVA) that were revealed during the recount. In the notification, the Justice Department alleged that the Oneida County Board of Elections failed to process at least 2,400 voter registration applications that had been submitted by the deadline, and improperly rejected hundreds of affidavit ballots. Tenney called the suit a "shakedown" and speculated that it was an attempt to cast doubt on her win. On July 12, the DOJ announced that it had reached a settlement with Oneida County. The settlement requires the Board of Elections to implement policies and procedures to ensure compliance with the NVRA and HAVA, and to periodically submit reports to the DOJ to demonstrate compliance. As of early 2022 the DOJ appears to have accepted Oneida County's changes, and has not pursued further action.

Electoral commissioners in New York State are subject to very few requirements, and the positions are often given out as party patronage. Proposals for reforming boards of elections included term limits, state funding, the option to bring in state workers to assist a Board of Election under stress, adding basic job requirements such as a college degree and relevant experience, and the abolition of the present system of political appointees in favor of permanent civil service positions.

== See also ==
- Similar lengthy recounts:
  - 2000 United States presidential election in Florida
  - 2004 Washington gubernatorial election
  - 2008 United States Senate election in Minnesota
- List of close election results
- List of "-gate" scandals and controversies
