= Robert S. Rose =

American politician

Robert Selden Rose
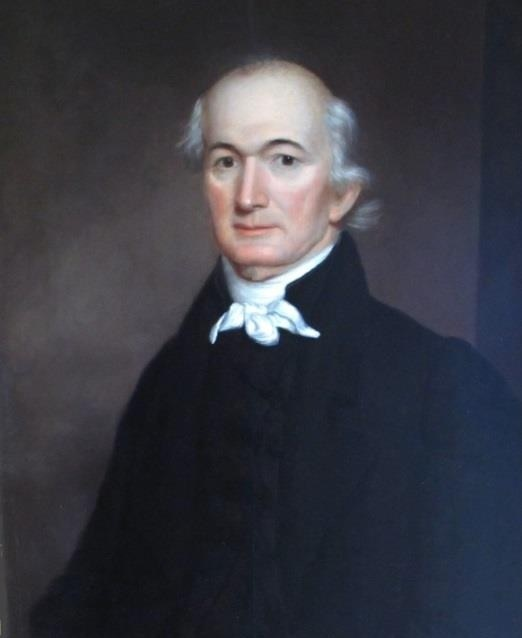
- Robert Selden Rose, New York Congressman

Member of the U.S. House of Representatives from New York's 26th district
- In office March 4, 1823 – March 4, 1827
- Preceded by: District established
- Succeeded by: John Maynard
- In office March 4, 1829 – March 4, 1831
- Preceded by: John Maynard
- Succeeded by: John Dickson

Personal details
- Born: February 24, 1774 Amherst County, Virginia Colony, British America
- Died: November 24, 1835 (aged 61) Waterloo, New York, U.S.
- Resting place: Glenwood Cemetery, Geneva, New York, U.S.
- Party: Adams-Clay Democratic-Republican
- Children: Robert Lawson Rose (son); Robert C. Nicholas (son-in-law)

Robert Selden Rose (February 24, 1774 – November 24, 1835) was a U.S. representative (1823–1827) from New York.

== Early life and education ==
Born in Amherst County in the Virginia Colony, Rose attended the common schools.

== Marriage and family ==
Rose married Jane Lawson in Virginia, and they had seven children, including a son, Robert Lawson Rose (1804–1877), who also served as US Congressman from New York (1847–1851).

== Slave Owner ==
The 1810 Census shows 37 enslaved people in his household, who worked on his plantation and served in his house. The 1820 Census shows 9 enslaved people. Slavery ended in New York state in 1827, and the 1830 Census shows 3 free people of color in his household and no slaves.

== Career ==
In an unusual migration path, Rose moved north to Seneca County, New York in 1803. It was a time when millions of acres of public land were sold at inexpensive prices. He purchased land from Dr. Alexander Coventry and settled at Fayette, New York, near Geneva, New York, where he named his plantation Rose Hill.

He was first elected as a member of the state assembly in 1811. He was elected again in 1820 and 1821. That year he also served as a member of the state constitutional convention at Albany, New York.

In 1822 Rose was elected to the Eighteenth Congress as an Adams-Clay Democratic-Republican. He was reelected as an Adams candidate to the Nineteenth Congress, serving in total from March 4, 1823 – March 3, 1827.

The following year, Rose was elected as an anti-Masonic candidate to the Twenty-first Congress (March 4, 1829 – March 3, 1831). He was later affiliated with the Whig Party. After serving in Congress, he resumed agricultural pursuits.

Rose died in Waterloo, New York, while attending a session of the circuit court, on November 24, 1835. He was interred in the Old Pulteney Street Cemetery. Later his remains were reinterred in Glenwood Cemetery, Geneva, New York.

State Senator Robert C. Nicholas (1801–1854) was his son-in-law.

U.S. House of Representatives
| New district | Member of the U.S. House of Representatives from New York's 26th congressional district 1823–1827 with Dudley Marvin | Succeeded by John Maynard, Dudley Marvin |
| Preceded by John Maynard, Dudley Marvin | Member of the U.S. House of Representatives from New York's 26th congressional district 1829–1831 with Jehiel H. Halsey | Succeeded by John Dickson, William Babcock |
