= John Maynard (New York politician) =

American judge

John Maynard (January 8, 1786 in Frederick County, Maryland – March 24, 1850 in Auburn) was an American lawyer and politician from New York.

== Life ==
Maynard graduated from Union College, Schenectady, New York, in 1810. Then he studied law, and was admitted to the bar and commenced practice at Seneca Falls, New York. He was Clerk of Seneca County from 1821 to 1825. He was a member of the New York State Assembly (Seneca Co.) in 1822.

Maynard was elected as an Adams man to the 20th United States Congress, holding office from March 4, 1827, to March 3, 1829. He was D.A. of Seneca County in 1836 and 1837. He was a member of the New York State Senate (7th D.) from 1838 to 1841, sitting in the 61st, 62nd, 63rd and 64th New York State Legislatures. He resigned his seat on March 4, 1841.

Maynard was elected as a Whig to the 27th United States Congress, holding office from March 4, 1841, to March 3, 1843.

He moved to Auburn, and was a justice of the New York Supreme Court (7th D.) from 1847 until his death. In 1850, he was ex officio a judge of the New York Court of Appeals.

== Sources ==
- United States Congress. "John Maynard (id: M000285)". Biographical Directory of the United States Congress.

U.S. House of Representatives
| Preceded by Dudley Marvin, Robert S. Rose | Member of the U.S. House of Representatives from New York's 26th congressional district 1827–1829 with Dudley Marvin | Succeeded by Jehiel H. Halsey, Robert S. Rose |
New York State Senate
| Preceded by Thomas Armstrong | New York State Senate; Third District (Class 3); 1838–1841 | Succeeded by William Bartlit |
U.S. House of Representatives
| Preceded by Theron R. Strong | Member of the U.S. House of Representatives from New York's 25th congressional district 1841–1843 | Succeeded by George O. Rathbun |
