= West Bloomfield, New York =

- Town
- Location within the state of New York
- Coordinates: 42°54′43″N 77°31′32″W
- Country: United States
- State: New York
- County: Ontario

Government
  - Type: Town Council
  - Town Supervisor: Tim Schiefen
  - Town Council: Town Council members: Ruth Smith; Kevin Carey; Bill Travis; Scott Harman

Area
  - Total: 25.50 sq mi (66.05 km^{2})
  - Land: 25.46 sq mi (65.94 km^{2})
  - Water: 0.039 sq mi (0.10 km^{2})
- Elevation: 965 ft (294 m)

Population (2020)
  - Total: 2,760 ▲
  - Estimate (2021): 2,746
  - Density: 98.5/sq mi (38.05/km^{2})
- Time zone: UTC-5 (Eastern (EST))
  - Summer (DST): UTC-4 (EDT)
- ZIP codes: 14585 (W. Bloomfield) & 14475 (Ionia)
- Area code: 585
- FIPS code: 36-79356
- GNIS feature ID: 0979618
- Website: https://www.westbloomfieldny.gov/

West Bloomfield is a town in Ontario County, New York, United States. The population was 2,760 at the 2020 census.

The Town of West Bloomfield is on the county's western border and sits parallel to the Town of East Bloomfield, both of which lie south of the City of Rochester.

== History ==
The town is within the historic homeland of the Seneca Nation, and tradition holds that three of the tribe's villages were located in the town. As such, during the spring season when much of the town's farmland is being plowed, it is not uncommon to find arrowheads and other artifacts.The first Europeans to visit the area were members of the Jesuits in the 17th century during their westward quests.

Settlement began around 1789 and the Town of West Bloomfield was officially established in 1833 from part of the Town of Bloomfield.

The West Bloomfield Congregational Church was founded in 1799. The Congregation would meet on top of a hill that would later (in 1806, current building erected in 1875) be home to the actual church building.

The town was home to the Batavia Branch Rail Line, or "Peanut Line", of the New York Central Railroad, which brought much prosperity and business to the town for almost a century. Built in 1853, it was a spur line between the rail hubs of Batavia and Canandaigua with stops in both the town itself and its hamlet of Ionia, there was also a trestle constructed on the eastern side of the town that spans the gap now occupied by NY-64 just before entering the Town of East Bloomfield. The line provided daily freight and passenger service, with connections to larger stations, and served as an integral part of the towns development. Service was discontinued in 1939, as ridership had fallen due to the usage of the automobile, and the railroad (experiencing its own financial troubles) was not making enough on freight to justify the cost.

The Ontario and Livingston Mutual Insurance Office and John and Mary Dickson House are listed on the National Register of Historic Places.

== Geography ==
According to the United States Census Bureau, the town has a total area of 25.5 square miles (66 km^{2}), of which 25.5 square miles (66 km^{2}) is land and 0.04 square miles (0.10 km^{2}) (0.16%) is water.

West Bloomfield is the second smallest town in the county by area.

The west town line is the border of Livingston County, formed by Honeoye Creek.

Conjoined US Route 20 and New York State Route 5 cross the town. New York State Route 64 is by the eastern town line, and New York State Route 65 is in the northwestern corner of West Bloomfield.

The town sits on the southern edge of the Hopper Hills and the northern edge of the Bristol Hills, and features a number of high points with views of the Finger Lakes Region (including Honeoye and Canandaigua lake areas).

== Demographics ==
Historical population
Census	Pop.	Note	%±
1840	2,094		—
1850	1,698		−18.9%
1860	1,646		−3.1%
1870	1,651		0.3%
1880	1,713		3.8%
1890	1,481		−13.5%
1900	1,306		−11.8%
1910	1,181		−9.6%
1920	1,113		−5.8%
1930	1,040		−6.6%
1940	1,068		2.7%
1950	1,155		8.1%
1960	1,444		25.0%
1970	1,990		37.8%
1980	2,281		14.6%
1990	2,536		11.2%
2000	2,549		0.5%
2010	2,466		−3.3%
2020	2,760		11.9%
2021 (est.)	2,746		−0.5%
U.S. Decennial Census

As of the census of 2000, there were 2,549 people, 1,013 households, and 729 families residing in the town. The population density was 99.9 inhabitants per square mile (38.6/km^{2}). There were 1,049 housing units at an average density of 41.1 per square mile (15.9/km^{2}). The racial makeup of the town was 98.27% White, 0.43% African American, 0.31% Native American, 0.12% Asian, 0.31% from other races, and 0.55% from two or more races. Hispanic or Latino of any race were 0.78% of the population.

There were 1,013 households, out of which 32.2% had children under the age of 18 living with them, 59.2% were married couples living together, 8.6% had a female householder with no husband present, and 28.0% were non-families. 22.1% of all households were made up of individuals, and 8.4% had someone living alone who was 65 years of age or older. The average household size was 2.52 and the average family size was 2.92.

In the town, the population was spread out, with 24.2% under the age of 18, 6.2% from 18 to 24, 28.6% from 25 to 44, 28.7% from 45 to 64, and 12.3% who were 65 years of age or older. The median age was 40 years. For every 100 females, there were 101.8 males. For every 100 females age 18 and over, there were 97.0 males.

The median income for a household in the town was $43,347, and the median income for a family was $52,206. Males had a median income of $37,340 versus $26,410 for females. The per capita income for the town was $20,309. About 1.9% of families and 3.2% of the population were below the poverty line, including 0.7% of those under age 18 and 6.1% of those age 65 or over.

== Government ==
=== Executive ===
The town's executive government is made up of an elected Town Board (four members) and an elected Town Supervisor, both positions are part-time; terms are four years. The town does operate its own court for minor criminal, civil and traffic matters; this is presided over by an elected Court Justice the current serving Court Justice is Richard L. Whitesell.

=== Public Works/Utilities ===
- An elected Highway Supervisor who oversees operation of the West Bloomfield Town Highway Department; this department is also largely used for general "Public Works" as well.
- The majority of residents have well water due to the sparse, rural population. A small, populated section in the central part of the town does have piped water for homes and fire hydrants; the town managed this via the Highway Department until control was ceded to the Monroe County Water Authority around 2011 as part of a deal to receive significant improvements to the system.
- Electric services are provided by companies such as National Grid, Niagara Mohawk and RG&E, however a growing number of residents are turning to alternative forms of power such as solar or wind.
- The town operates Michael Prouty Memorial Park as the sole town park/recreation area. The park is home to a baseball diamond, a multi use sports field area, a pavilion and a playground. In years past, the town operated a summer recreation program for youths at the park, however in recent years due to funding concerns the town has joined with East Bloomfield to offer a joint program at the central school grounds.

=== Law Enforcement ===
The town does not operate its own police department, and the area maintains low crime rates. It instead relies on the services of the Ontario County Sheriffs Office, who post a Deputy in town, and patrolling Troopers of the New York State Police who will act as a backup unit for the Deputy should the need arise.

=== Emergency Services ===
All 911 calls in the town are directed through the Ontario County Sheriffs Office as the town does not have its own call center.

==== Fire/Rescue ====
The town utilizes two volunteer fire stations; one in the northern hamlet of Ionia and a second is located centrally by the town highway garages on Co Rd 37. In total, roughly thirty men and women operate a combined nine fire/rescue apparatus, responding to ~100 calls for service per year. The majority of fire/rescue personnel are state certified interior/exterior firefighters (those who are not provide support services at scenes) and several hold specialized certifications in the HazMat, Rope Rescue, FAST and EMS fields.

==== EMS/Ambulance ====
For many years (~1960's-2005), the town operated its own volunteer ambulance squad. Due to low membership, aging equipment and rising costs of operation, the squad was disbanded around 2004/2005. The town initially contracted with a local paid private ambulance service that covered the neighboring towns of East Bloomfield and Bristol. Both those towns however either began paying their members or increased volunteerism and dropped the paid private service, resulting in fewer ambulances in the area and increasingly longer response times. In late 2014, the Chief of the fire department approached the Town Supervisor about concerns regarding the fire departments already limited EMS staffing being forced to deal with increased wait times for an ambulance. In 2015, the town severed its contract with the private service and entered into a new contract with the neighboring municipality of Honeoye Falls for use of their ambulance and Paramedic fly-car services on a regular basis.

== Notable people ==
- Joseph H. Bottum, former South Dakota State Senator
- John Dickson, former US Congressman
- Anna Gertrude Hall, author and librarian

== Communities and locations in West Bloomfield ==
- Bush Corner – A hamlet east of West Bloomfield village on US-20.
- Factory Hollow – A historic location.
- Ionia – A hamlet on NY-64 in the northeast part of the town.
- Millers Corners – A historic location also known as "Taylorville," was in the northeast part of West Bloomfield. It would later be renamed "Taylorsville", and then, finally, "Ionia".
- North Bloomfield – A hamlet at the west town line, northwest of West Bloomfield village is on NY-65.
- West Bloomfield – The hamlet of West Bloomfield on US-20/NY-5.
- West Bloomfield Station – A historic location.
