= Justin Dwinell =

American politician

Member of the U.S. House of Representatives from New York's 22nd district
- In office March 4, 1823 – March 3, 1825
- Preceded by: Albert H. Tracy
- Succeeded by: John Miller

Personal details
- Born: October 28, 1785 Shaftsbury, Vermont Republic
- Died: September 17, 1850 (aged 64) Cazenovia, New York, U.S.
- Party: Democratic-Republican
- Children: John W. Dwinelle

Justin Dwinell (October 28, 1785 Shaftsbury, Bennington County, Vermont – September 17, 1850 Cazenovia, Madison County, New York) was an American lawyer and politician from New York.

== Life ==
He was the son of Stephen Dwinell (1745–1801) and Susanna (Olin) Dwinell. He attended Williams College, and graduated from Yale College in 1808. Then he studied law in Troy with John D. Dickinson, was admitted to the bar in 1811, and commenced practice in Cazenovia. On September 12, 1813, he married Louise Whipple, and they had nine children, among them California Assemblyman John W. Dwinelle (1816–1881).

Justin Dwinell was member of the New York State Assembly (Madison Co.) in 1820–21 and 1822. He was First Judge of the Madison County Court from 1823 to 1828.

Dwinell was elected as a Crawford Democratic-Republican to the 18th United States Congress, holding office from March 4, 1823, to March 3, 1825. He was District Attorney of Madison County from 1837 to 1845.

He was buried at the Evergreen Cemetery in Cazenovia, New York.

His last name sometimes appears as "Dwinelle," and that is how it is spelled on his gravestone.

U.S. House of Representatives
Preceded by Albert H. Tracy	Member of the U.S. House of Representatives from New York's 22nd congressional district 1823–1825	Succeeded by John Miller
