= Lewis Riggs =

American politician (1789–1870)

Member of the U.S. House of Representatives from New York's 22nd district
- In office March 4, 1841 – March 3, 1843
- Preceded by: Amasa Dana
- Succeeded by: Seat eliminated

Personal details
- Born: January 16, 1789 Norfolk, Connecticut, U.S.
- Died: November 6, 1870 (aged 81) Homer, New York, U.S.
- Resting place: Glenwood Cemetery
- Party: Democratic
- Occupation: Politician, physician

Lewis Riggs (January 16, 1789 – November 6, 1870) was an American medical doctor and politician who served one term as a U.S. representative from New York from 1841 to 1843.

== Biography ==
Born in Norfolk, Connecticut, Riggs attended the common schools and schools of Latin and Greek. He was apprenticed to the carpenter's trade.

He studied medicine in the village of Torringford, Connecticut, and received his diploma in May 1812. He also attended medical lectures given by Benjamin Rush at the University of Pennsylvania, Philadelphia, Pennsylvania, in 1812. Practiced in East Winsted, Connecticut. He moved to Vernon, New York, in 1813 and later to Homer, New York, continuously practicing his profession.

=== Political career ===
He also engaged in business as a retail druggist and in 1828 in the sale of dry goods. He served as secretary of the Cortland County Medical Society 1820–1823 and as president in 1825 and 1826. He was appointed postmaster of Homer by President Jackson on April 25, 1829, and served until August 7, 1839.

==== Congress ====
He was elected as a Democrat to the Twenty-seventh Congress (March 4, 1841 – March 3, 1843).

=== Later career and death ===
He resumed the practice of medicine. Also operated a flour mill.

He died in Homer, New York, November 6, 1870. He was interred in Glenwood Cemetery.

== Sources ==
- United States Congress. "Lewis Riggs (id: R000255)". Biographical Directory of the United States Congress.

U.S. House of Representatives
Preceded by Amasa Dana	Member of the U.S. House of Representatives from New York's 22nd congressional district 1841–1843	Succeeded by Seat eliminated
