= John Dickson (New York politician) =

American politician

Chairman of the Committee on Revisal and Unfinished Business
- In office 1833–1835

Member of the U.S. House of Representatives from New York's 26th district
- In office March 4, 1831 – March 3, 1835 Serving with William Babcock (1831-1833)
- Preceded by: Jehiel H. Halsey; Robert S. Rose
- Succeeded by: Francis Granger

New York State Assembly
- In office 1829–1830

Personal details
- Born: June 1, 1783 Keene, New Hampshire, U.S.
- Died: February 22, 1852 (aged 68) West Bloomfield, New York, U.S.
- Resting place: Pioneer Cemetery
- Party: Anti-Masonic
- Education: Middlebury College

John Dickson (June 1, 1783 – February 22, 1852) was a U.S. representative from New York.

== Early years ==
Born in Keene, New Hampshire, Dickson graduated from Middlebury College of Vermont in 1808. He studied law and was admitted to the bar in 1812 and commenced practice in West Bloomfield, New York.

== Career ==
He served as member of the State assembly in 1829 and 1830.

Dickson was elected as an Anti-Masonic candidate to the Twenty-second and Twenty-third Congresses (March 4, 1831 – March 3, 1835). He served as chairman of the Committee on Revisal and Unfinished Business (Twenty-third Congress).

== Personal life ==
He resumed the practice of law in West Bloomfield, New York, where he died on February 22, 1852. He was interred in Pioneer Cemetery. His home at West Bloomfield, known as the John and Mary Dickson House, was listed on the National Register of Historic Places in 2005.

U.S. House of Representatives
Preceded by Jehiel H. Halsey and Robert S. Rose (in a two-seat district)	Member of the U.S. House of Representatives from New York's 26th congressional district March 4, 1831 – March 3, 1835; Served alongside: William Babcock (until March 4, 1833, in a two-seat district)	Succeeded by Francis Granger
