= Dudley Marvin =

American politician (1786–1852)

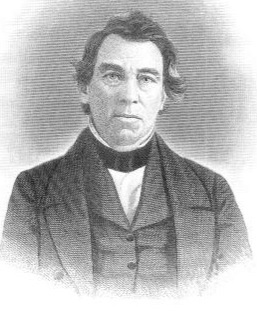

Member of the U.S. House of Representatives from New York's 31st district
- In office March 4, 1847 – March 3, 1849
- Preceded by: Abner Lewis
- Succeeded by: Elijah Risley

Member of the U.S. House of Representatives from New York's 26th district
- In office March 4, 1823 – March 3, 1829 Serving with Robert S. Rose (1823–1827); John Maynard (1827–1829)
- Preceded by: New district
- Succeeded by: Jehiel H. Halsey; Robert S. Rose

Personal details
- Born: May 9, 1786 Lyme, Connecticut, U.S.
- Died: June 25, 1852 (aged 66) Ripley, New York, U.S.
- Resting place: East Ripley Cemetery, Ripley, New York, U.S.
- Party: Whig
- Other political affiliations: Adams-Clay Republican; Adams Republican
- Spouse: Mary Jepson Whalley (m. 1818)
- Children: 1
- Occupation: Attorney

Military service
- Allegiance: United States; New York
- Years of service: 1812–c. 1832
- Rank: Major General
- Unit: New York Militia
- Commands: 11th Regiment; 24th Brigade; 22nd Division
- Wars: War of 1812

Dudley Marvin (May 9, 1786 – June 25, 1852) was an American politician and attorney from New York. He served as a U.S. representative for four two-year terms, 1823 to 1829 and 1847 to 1849.

A native of Lyme, Connecticut, Marvin attended Connecticut's Colchester Academy, then moved to Canandaigua, New York. He studied law from 1807 to 1811, was admitted to the bar, and began to practice in Erie, Pennsylvania. He soon returned to Canandaigua, where he continued to practice law. Marvin joined the New York Militia in 1812, and was promoted through the ranks to major general.

In 1822, Marvin was elected to the U.S. House as an Adams-Clay Republican, and he was reelected in 1824 and 1826 as an Adams Republican. Marvin served in the 18th, 19th, and 20th Congresses, March 4, 1823 to March 3, 1829. After leaving Congress, Marvin practiced law and invented several farm machines and implements, for which he obtained patents. He lived in Maryland and Virginia, then moved to New York City in 1836 and Brooklyn in 1837. In 1843, he moved to Ripley, New York. In 1846, Marvin was again elected to the U.S. House, this time as a Whig. He served in the 30th Congress, March 4, 1847 to March 3, 1849. After leaving Congress, he resumed practicing law in Ripley, where he died on June 25, 1852. Marvin was interred at East Ripley Cemetery in Ripley.

== Early life and career ==
Dudley Marvin was born in Lyme, Connecticut on May 9, 1786, a son of Elisa Marvin and Elizabeth (Selden) Marvin. He was educated in Lyme and attended Colchester Academy in Colchester, Connecticut. In 1807, Marvin moved to Canandaigua, New York, where he studied law at the firm of Nathaniel W. Howell & Greig. He attained admission to the bar in 1811, and began to practice in Erie, Pennsylvania. He returned to Canandaigua later that year, where he continued to practice law. He went on to form a partnership with Mark H. Sibley, who had studied law in his office.

During the War of 1812, Marvin joined the New York Militia as a first lieutenant in the 11th Regiment (Ontario County), and he was with his unit in the Rochester, New York area when it was called up in anticipation of a British attack from Canada. He remained in the militia after the war, and became regimental quartermaster as a captain in 1818, and regimental adjutant in 1819. He was promoted to major in 1820, and became commander of the regiment as a colonel in 1821. He was subsequently promoted to brigadier general as commander of the 24th Brigade, and in 1830 major general as commander of the 22nd Division.

In 1818, Marvin married Mary Jepson Whalley; they were the parents of a son, Selden Marvin. Selden Marvin was an attorney and politician who served as judge of Chautauqua County, New York and mayor of Erie, Pennsylvania.

In 1822, Marvin was elected to the United States House of Representatives as an Adams-Clay Republican. He was reelected as an Adams Republican in 1824 and 1826, and served from March 4, 1823 to March 3, 1829, the 18th, 19th, and 20th Congresses. While in Congress, he became friendly with Henry Clay, and was a supporter of several policies Clay advocated, including protective tariffs. In addition, he was a supporter of John Quincy Adams for president in 1824 and again in 1828.

== Continued career ==
After leaving Congress, Marvin resumed practicing law in Canandaigua, then lived in Maryland and Virginia. In 1836, he moved to New York City, and in 1837 he relocated to Brooklyn. In 1843, Marvin moved to Ripley, New York, where he intended to retire, but his knowledge of and experience in the courts of western New York caused clients and other lawyers to regularly employ him as counsel and co-counsel. In 1844, he supported Clay, the Whig nominee for president. In 1846, he was nominated for delegate to the state constitutional convention; when the convention determined that Chautauqua County was entitled to only two delegates, Marvin withdrew, enabling George W. Patterson and Richard P. Marvin to serve.

In 1846, Marvin was again elected to the U.S. House, this time as a Whig. He served from March 4, 1847 to March 3, 1849, the 30th Congress. During this term, Marvin gave a speech in which he argued that the federal government had the authority to prohibit slavery in territory acquired during the Mexican–American War.

After his term, Marvin resumed practicing law in Ripley, where he was active in the Presbyterian church and was an advocate of the temperance movement. Marvin was an inventor and became active in the American Institute of the City of New York. Among the devices for which he obtained patents were a furnace for heating the iron hoops used in constructing wagon wheels and an inclined plane excavator for excavating and removing soil. Marvin was also active in the Chautauqua County Agricultural Society.

Marvin died in Ripley on June 25, 1852. (Note: Some sources incorrectly give the death year as 1856.) He was buried at East Ripley Cemetery in Ripley.

== Notes ==
U.S. House of Representatives
New district	Member of the U.S. House of Representatives from New York's 26th congressional district 1823–1829 with Robert S. Rose 1823–1827 and John Maynard 1827–1829	Succeeded by Jehiel H. Halsey; Robert S. Rose
Preceded by Abner Lewis	Member of the U.S. House of Representatives from New York's 31st congressional district 1847–1849	Succeeded by Elijah Risley
