= Ontario and Livingston Mutual Insurance Office =

Historic commercial building in New York, United States

- U.S. National Register of Historic Places
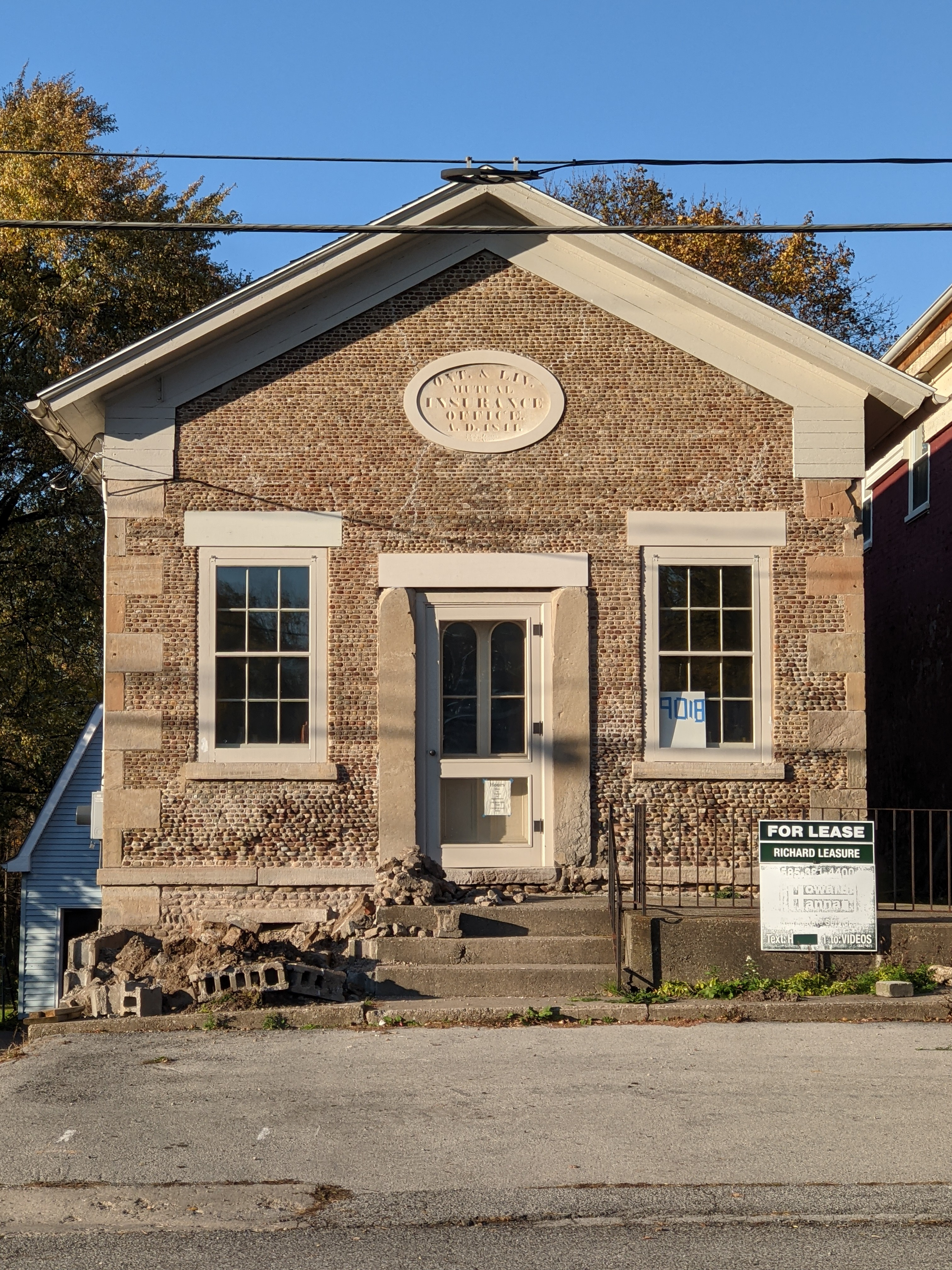

- Location within New York Location within the United States
- Location: 9018 Main St., West Bloomfield, New York
- Coordinates: 42°54′28″N 77°32′13″W
- Area: less than one acre
- Built: 1841
- Architectural style: Greek Revival
- MPS: Cobblestone Architecture of New York State MPS
- NRHP reference No.: 08001078
- Added to NRHP: November 21, 2008

The Ontario and Livingston Mutual Insurance Office was built in 1841. It is significant as one of only about 20 commercial structures known to have been built with cobblestone architecture.
