= Nicoll Halsey =

American politician (1782–1865)

Nicoll Halsey (March 8, 1782 – March 3, 1865) was an American politician who served one term as a U.S. representative from New York from 1833 to 1835.

He was the son of Silas Halsey and brother of Jehiel Howell Halsey.

== Biography ==
Born in Southampton, New York, Halsey moved to Herkimer County in 1793 with his parents, who settled in what is now the town of Lodi, New York. He attended the common schools. He moved to Tompkins County and settled near Trumansburg in 1808.

=== Career ===
He engaged in agricultural pursuits and milling. He was supervisor for Ulysses, New York in 1812, 1814, 1815, 1818, 1821, and 1826. He served as member of the State assembly in 1816 and again in 1824. He was sheriff of Tompkins County from 1819 to 1821.

=== Congress ===
Halsey was elected as a Jacksonian to the Twenty-third Congress, serving from March 4, 1833 to March 3, 1835. He was not a candidate for renomination in 1834.

=== Later career and death ===
He was appointed judge of the Tompkins County Court on February 11, 1834. He resumed the milling business.

He died while on a visit in Marshall, Michigan, March 3, 1865. He was interred in Grove Cemetery, Trumansburg, New York.

U.S. House of Representatives
Preceded by Edward C. Reed	Member of the U.S. House of Representatives from New York's 22nd congressional district 1833–1835	Succeeded by Stephen B. Leonard
