= Hiram Gray =

American judge

Hiram Gray (July 10, 1801 in Salem, Washington County, New York – May 6, 1890 in Elmira, Chemung County, New York) was an American lawyer, jurist, and politician from New York who served one term in the U.S. House of Representatives from 1837 to 1839. He was also a judge at both the federal and state levels.

== Education ==
He graduated from Union College in 1821. Then he studied law, was admitted to the bar in 1823, and commenced practice in Elmira, New York.

== US Congress ==
Gray was elected as a Democrat to the 25th United States Congress, and served from March 4, 1837, to March 3, 1839.

== New York state judiciary ==
He was Judge of the Sixth Judicial District from 1846 to 1847. He was a justice of the New York Supreme Court from 1847 to 1859, and was ex officio a judge of the New York Court of Appeals in 1851 and 1859. He was a Commissioner of Appeals from 1870 to 1875.

Gray wrote the majority opinion in the case of Lawrence v. Fox, 1859, giving contractual rights to the third-party Lawrence in a debt collection case.

== Death ==
Gray was buried at the Woodlawn Cemetery in Elmira.

== External sources ==
- United States Congress. "Hiram Gray (id: G000397)". Biographical Directory of the United States Congress.
- The New York Civil List compiled by Franklin Benjamin Hough (pages 351 and 356; Weed, Parsons and Co., 1858)
- Court of Appeals judges

U.S. House of Representatives
Preceded by Joseph Reynolds	Member of the U.S. House of Representatives from New York's 22nd congressional district 1837–1839; Seat B	Succeeded by Amasa Dana
