= John G. Stower =

American politician

John G. Stower (1791 Madison, Madison County, New York – December 20, 1850 in Chittenango, Madison Co., NY) was an American lawyer and politician from New York and Florida. From 1827 to 1829, he served one term in the U.S. House of Representatives.

== Life ==
He married Harriet (1795–1823), and they had several children. In 1817, he began publishing the Hamilton Recorder with P. B. Havens. He was Surrogate of Madison County from 1821 to 1827. On September 2, 1824, he married Amelia Kellogg (1804–1882), and their only child died in infancy.

=== Congress ===
Stower was elected as a Jacksonian to the 20th United States Congress, holding office from March 4, 1827, to March 3, 1829.

On April 20, 1829, Stower received a recess appointment from President Andrew Jackson as United States Attorney for the Southern District of Florida, and took up his duties at Key West, Florida. He resigned in March 1830, before the U.S. Senate took a vote on the nomination.

=== Later career and death ===
He was a member of the New York State Senate (5th D.) from 1833 to 1835, sitting in the 56th, 57th and 58th New York State Legislatures. He resigned his seat on September 29, 1835.

He was President of the Village of Chittenango, New York from 1847 to 1848.

He died of "consumption and pulmonary attack", and was buried at the Madison Street Cemetery in Hamilton.

== Sources ==
- United States Congress. "John G. Stower (id: S000986)". Biographical Directory of the United States Congress.
- The New York Civil List compiled by Franklin Benjamin Hough (pages 129f, 146 and 414; Weed, Parsons and Co., 1858)
- Journal of the U.S. Senate (1830; pg. 442)
- A Register of Officers and Agents...In the Service of the United States (September 1829; pg. 223)
- Gazetteer of the State of New York by J. H. French (1860; pg. 389)
- Stowers Families of America (pg. 100f) [gives name erroneously as "Stowers"]

U.S. House of Representatives
Preceded by John Miller	Member of the U.S. House of Representatives from New York's 22nd congressional district 1827–1829	Succeeded by Thomas Beekman
Legal offices
Preceded by William Allison McRea	U.S. Attorney for the Southern District of Florida; 1829–1830	Succeeded by John K. Campbell
New York State Senate
Preceded by William H. Maynard	New York State Senate; Fifth District (Class 2); 1833–1835	Succeeded by David Wager
