= Samuel S. Ellsworth =

American politician

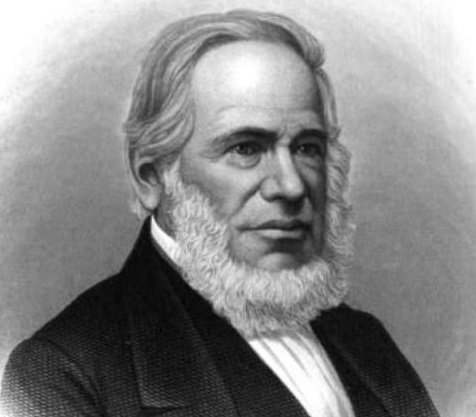
- An illustration of Ellsworth from History of Yates County, N. Y. (1892)

Member of the U.S. House of Representatives from New York's 26th district
- In office March 4, 1845 – March 3, 1847
- Preceded by: Amasa Dana
- Succeeded by: William T. Lawrence

Personal details
- Born: Samuel Stewart Ellsworth; October 13, 1790 Pownal, Vermont, USA
- Died: June 4, 1863 (aged 72) Penn Yan, New York, USA
- Resting place: Lake View Cemetery
- Party: Democratic

Samuel Stewart Ellsworth (October 13, 1790 – June 4, 1863) was an American politician who served one term as a U.S. representative from New York from 1845 to 1847.

== Biography ==
Born in Pownal, Vermont, Ellsworth attended the common schools. He moved to Penn Yan, New York, in 1819 and engaged in mercantile pursuits. Supervisor of Milo, Yates County from 1824 to 1828. He served as judge of Yates County from 1824 to 1829. He served in the State assembly in 1840.

=== Congress ===
Ellsworth was elected as a Democrat to the Twenty-ninth Congress (March 4, 1845 – March 3, 1847).

=== Death ===
He died in Penn Yan, New York, June 4, 1863. He was interred in Lake View Cemetery.

U.S. House of Representatives
Preceded by Amasa Dana	Member of the U.S. House of Representatives from New York's 26th congressional district 1845–1847	Succeeded by William T. Lawrence
