= Edward C. Reed =

American politician

Member of the U.S. House of Representatives from New York's 22nd district
- In office March 4, 1831 – March 3, 1833
- Preceded by: Thomas Beekman
- Succeeded by: Nicoll Halsey

Personal details
- Born: Edward Cambridge Reed; March 8, 1793 Fitzwilliam, New Hampshire, U.S.
- Died: May 1, 1883 (aged 90) Ithaca, New York, U.S.
- Resting place: Glenwood Cemetery, Homer, New York, U.S.
- Party: Jacksonian
- Education: Dartmouth College
- Profession: Politician, lawyer

Military service
- Allegiance: United States
- Battles/wars: War of 1812

Edward Cambridge Reed (March 8, 1793 – May 1, 1883) was an American lawyer and War of 1812 veteran who served one term as a U.S. representative from New York from 1831 to 1833.

== Biography ==
Born in Fitzwilliam, New Hampshire, Reed attended the common schools. He graduated from Dartmouth College, Hanover, New Hampshire, in 1812 and served in the War of 1812 under Governor William L. Marcy.

=== Early career ===
After studying law in Troy, New York, Reed was admitted to the bar in 1816 and commenced his practice in Homer, New York. He was secretary of the board of trustees of Cortland Academy in Homer from 1822 to 1870. Between 1827 and 1836, he served as district attorney of Cortland County. He was admitted to the Court of Chancery in 1830.

=== Congress ===
Reed was elected as a Jacksonian Democrat to the 22nd United States Congress. His term lasted from March 4, 1831 to March 3, 1833.

=== Later career ===
He resumed the practice of law and was an associate judge of the court of common pleas of Cortland County from 1836 to 1840. He also served again as district attorney in 1856. He moved to Ithaca, New York in 1875 and resumed the practice of his profession.

=== Death ===
Reed died in Ithaca on May 1, 1883 and is interred in Glenwood Cemetery, Homer, New York.

== Sources ==
- United States Congress. "Edward C. Reed (id: R000115)". Biographical Directory of the United States Congress.

U.S. House of Representatives
Preceded by Thomas Beekman	Member of the U.S. House of Representatives from New York's 22nd congressional district 1831–1833	Succeeded by Nicoll Halsey
