= Amasa Dana =

American politician (1792–1867)

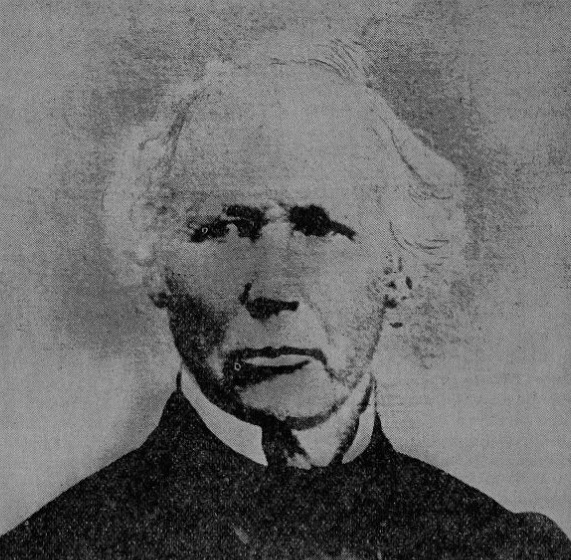
- From 1904's Initial Ithacans by Thomas W. Burns

Member of the United States House of Representatives from New York
- In office March 4, 1843 – March 3, 1845
- Preceded by: Francis Granger
- Succeeded by: Samuel S. Ellsworth
- Constituency: 26th district
- In office March 4, 1839 – March 3, 1841
- Preceded by: Hiram Gray
- Succeeded by: Lewis Riggs
- Constituency: 22nd district

Personal details
- Born: October 19, 1792 Wilkes-Barre, Pennsylvania, U.S.
- Died: December 24, 1867 (aged 75) Ithaca, New York, U.S.
- Resting place: Ithaca City Cemetery
- Party: Democratic
- Profession: Attorney; Judge

Amasa Dana (October 19, 1792 – December 24, 1867) was an American lawyer and politician who served two non-consecutive terms as a U.S. representative from New York from 1839 to 1841, and from 1843 to 1845.

== Biography ==
Born in Wilkes-Barre, Pennsylvania, Dana was the son of Aziel Dana and Rebecca (Cory) Dana. He attended private schools and Dana Academy in Wilkes-Barre, studied law with his uncle Eleazer Dana in Owego, New York, attained admission to the bar in 1817 and practiced in Owego.

=== Political career ===
Dana moved to Ithaca, New York in 1821 and continued the practice of law. He served as district attorney of Tompkins County from 1823 to 1837. He served as member of the New York State Assembly in 1828 and 1829. He served as president and trustee of the village of Ithaca in 1835, 1836, and 1839.

In 1837, Dana was elected judge of the Court of Common Pleas of Tompkins County. He was elected as a Democrat to the Twenty-sixth Congress (March 4, 1839 – March 3, 1841). He was not a candidate for renomination in 1840, and resumed the practice of law. From 1842 to 1843, Dana served as Ithaca's town supervisor.

=== Tenure in Congress ===
Dana was elected to the Twenty-eighth Congress (March 4, 1843 – March 3, 1845). During this term, he served as chairman of the Committee on Expenditures in the Department of the Navy. He resumed practicing law, and also engaged in banking and business, including serving as president of the Tompkins County National Bank. He died in Ithaca, New York, on December 24, 1867. He was interred in Ithaca City Cemetery.

== Family ==
In 1828, Dana married Mary Harper Speed, the daughter of Doctor Joseph Speed of Caroline, New York. They had no children.

== Sources ==
=== Books ===
- Burns, Thomas W. (1904). Initial Ithacans. Ithaca, NY: Ithaca Journal.
- Force, William Q. (1843). Congressional Directory for the First Session of the Twenty-Eighth Congress. Washington, DC: W. Q. Force.
- Kingman, Leroy Wilson (1907). Owego: Some Account of the Early Settlement of the Village in Tioga County. Owego, NY: Owego Gazette.
- Marquis, A. N. (1963). Who Was Who In America. Chicago, IL: Marquis Who's Who, Incorporated.
- Speed, Thomas (1892). Records and Memorials of the Speed Family. Louisville, KY: Courier-Journal Job Printing Company.
- U.S. Comptroller of the Currency (1867). Report of the Comptroller of the Currency. Washington, DC: US Government Printing Office.

U.S. House of Representatives
Preceded by Hiram Gray	Member of the U.S. House of Representatives from New York's 22nd congressional district 1839–1841	Succeeded by Lewis Riggs
Preceded by Francis Granger	Member of the U.S. House of Representatives from New York's 26th congressional district 1843–1845	Succeeded by Samuel S. Ellsworth
