= John Miller (New York politician) =

American politician

Member of the U.S. House of Representatives from New York's 22nd district
- In office March 4, 1825 – March 3, 1827
- Preceded by: Justin Dwinell
- Succeeded by: John G. Stower

Personal details
- Born: November 10, 1774 Amenia, Province of New York, British America
- Died: March 31, 1862 (aged 87) Truxton, New York, U.S.
- Resting place: City Cemetery, Truxton, New York, U.S.

John Miller (November 10, 1774 – March 31, 1862) was an American medical doctor and politician from New York.

== Life ==
He attended the district school and a private classical school in Kent, Connecticut. From 1793 on, he studied medicine, first with an uncle, then with Dr. Moshier in Easton, New York. In 1797, he went to Philadelphia and became a private pupil of Dr. Benjamin Rush, and attended Rush's and Dr. William Shippen's lectures at the University of Pennsylvania. In 1798, he returned to Easton and practiced in partnership with Dr. Moshier. Miller was licensed to practice medicine by the Vermont Medical Society in 1800, the law on licensing physicians not being enacted yet in the State of New York. In 1801, he removed to that part of the Town of Fabius which was split off as the Town of Truxton when Cortland County was established in 1808, and continued the practice of medicine there. In 1805, he married Phoebe (1779–1838), and they had eight children, among them Charles Miller MD (1816–1854).

He was Coroner of Cortland County from 1802 to 1805, Postmaster of Truxton from 1805 to 1825, a Justice of the Peace from 1812 to 1821, and an associate judge of the Cortland County Court from 1817 to 1820. He was a founding member of the Cortland County Medical Society in 1808, and was its first Vice President.

Miller was a member of the New York State Assembly in 1816–17, 1820 and 1846. He was elected as an Adams man to the Nineteenth United States Congress, holding office from March 4, 1825, to March 3, 1827. He was a delegate to the New York State Constitutional Convention of 1846.

Miller was buried at the City Cemetery in Truxton.

== Sources ==
- United States Congress. "John Miller (id: M000737)". Biographical Directory of the United States Congress.
- The New York Civil List compiled by Franklin Benjamin Hough (pages 58, 71, 192, 195, 231 and 292; Weed, Parsons and Co., 1858)
- Transactions of the American Medical Association (Vol. 14, 1864; pages 202f)
- Documents of the Senate of the State of New York (Vol. 5; pages 449ff)
- Death notice of his son Charles, in NYT on January 12, 1854

U.S. House of Representatives
Preceded by Justin Dwinell	Member of the U.S. House of Representatives from New York's 22nd congressional district 1825–1827	Succeeded by John G. Stower
