= New York's 22nd congressional district =

U.S. House district for New York

- Interactive map of district boundaries since January 3, 2025
- Representative: John Mannion; D–Geddes
- Distribution: 57.49% urban; 42.51% rural
- Population (2025): 765,479
- Median household income: $77,444
- Ethnicity: 75.7% White; 9.1% Black; 5.6% Hispanic; 4.6% Two or more races; 4.1% Asian; 0.9% other
- Cook PVI: D+4

New York's 22nd congressional district is a congressional district for the United States House of Representatives currently represented by Democratic John Mannion. Significant cities in the district include Syracuse and Utica; with the newest district boundaries approved by the New York State Legislature, the district also includes Auburn. The district is home to several colleges and universities, including Syracuse University, SUNY Environmental Science and Forestry, SUNY Upstate Medical University, Le Moyne College, Hamilton College, Colgate University, SUNY Cortland and Utica University.

The district now consists of all of Madison and Onondaga Counties, and parts of Cayuga, Cortland, and Oneida Counties.

== Recent election results from statewide races ==
Year	Office	Results
2008	President	Obama 56% – 42%
2012	President	Obama 58% – 42%
2016	President	Clinton 50% – 44%
2016	Senate	Schumer 67% – 30%
2018	Senate	Gillibrand 59% – 41%
2018	Governor	Molinaro 46% – 45%
2018	Attorney General	James 53% – 44%
2020	President	Biden 55% – 43%
2022	Senate	Schumer 54% – 46%
2022	Governor	Zeldin 51% – 49%
2022	Attorney General	James 50.1% – 49.9%
2022	Comptroller	DiNapoli 54% – 46%
2024	President	Harris 54% – 46%
2024	Senate	Gillibrand 56% – 44%

== History ==
2025–2027:

All of Madison, Onondaga
Parts of Cayuga, Cortland, Oneida

2023–2025:

All of Madison, Oneida, Onondaga
Parts of Oswego

2013–2023:

All of Chenango, Cortland, Madison, Oneida
Parts of Broome, Herkimer, Oswego, Tioga

2003–2012:

All of Sullivan, Ulster
Parts of Broome, Delaware, Dutchess, Orange, Tioga, Tompkins

1993–2003:

All of Columbia, Greene, Warren, Washington
Parts of Dutchess, Essex, Rensselaer, Saratoga, Schoharie

1983–1993:

All of Rockland
Parts of Orange, Sullivan, Westchester

1953–1983:

Parts of Bronx

1945–1953:

Parts of Manhattan

1919–1945:

Parts of Bronx, Manhattan

1913–1919:

Parts of New York

Various New York districts have been numbered "22" over the years, including areas in New York City and various parts of upstate New York. From 2003 to 2013, the district included all or parts of Broome, Delaware, Dutchess, Orange, Sullivan, Tioga, Tompkins, and Ulster counties. It included the cities of Binghamton, Ithaca, Kingston, Middletown, Newburgh and Poughkeepsie. The district stretched to include parts of the Finger Lakes region, the Catskill Mountains, and the Hudson Valley.

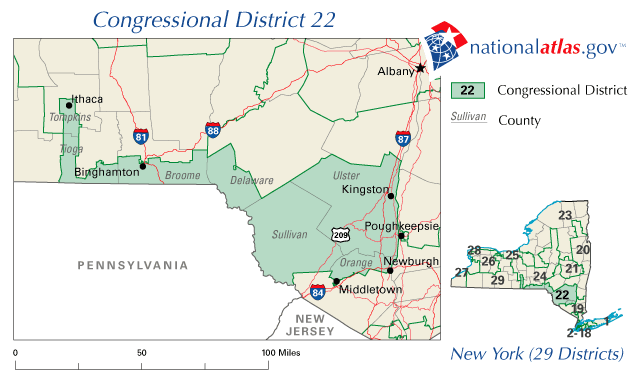
2003–2013

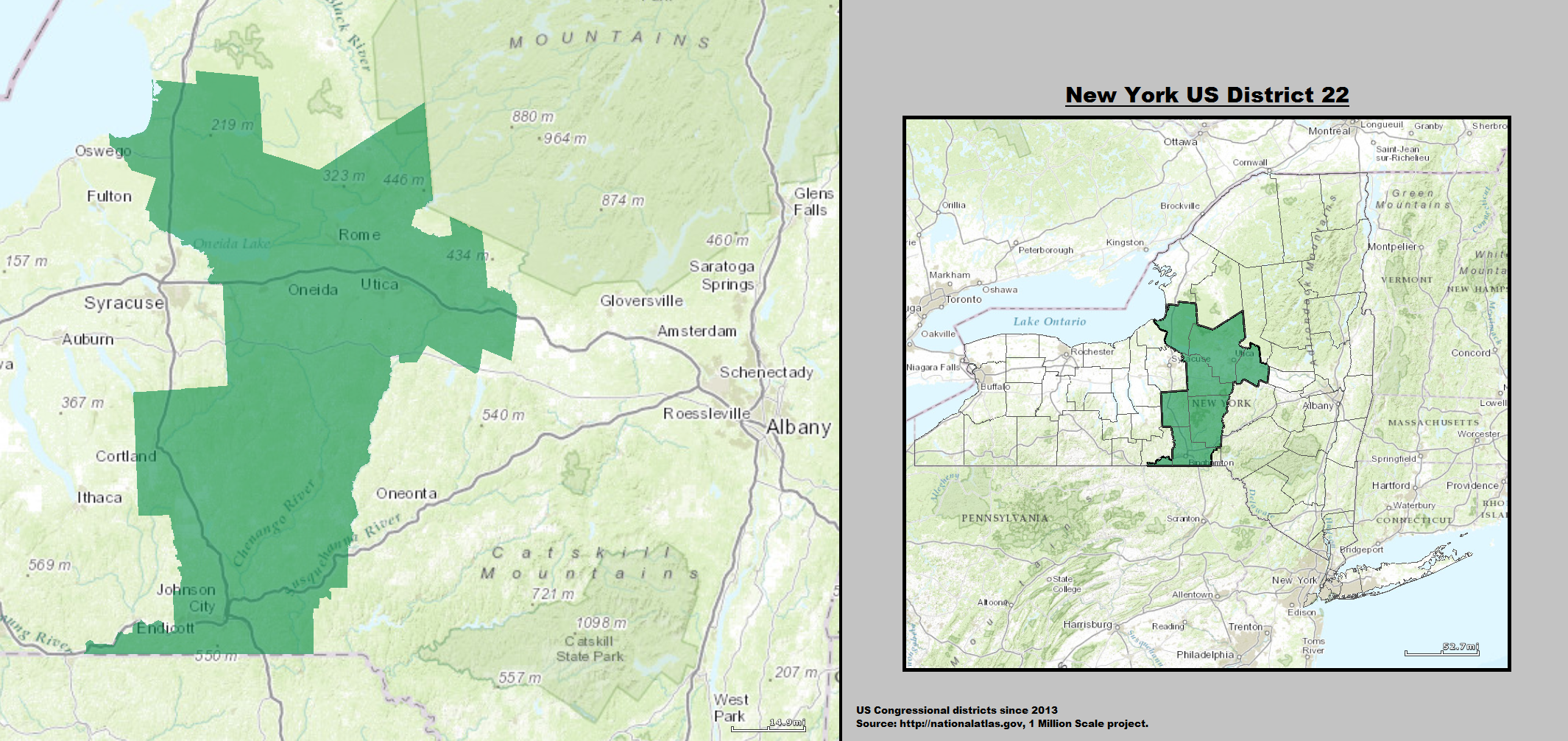
2013–2023

== Counties, towns, and cities ==
For the 119th and successive Congresses (based on the districts drawn following the New York Court of Appeals' December 2023 decision in Hoffman v New York State Ind. Redistricting. Commn.), the district contains all or portions of the following counties, towns, and cities.

Cayuga County (14)

Auburn, Fleming, Genoa, Ledyard, Locke, Moravia, Niles, Owasco, Scipio, Sempronius, Sennett, Springport, Summerhill, Venice

Cortland County (7)

Cortland, Cortlandville, Cuyler, Homer, Preble, Scott, Truxton

Madison County (16)

All 16 towns and cities

Oneida County (14)

Augusta, Bridgewater, Clinton, Kirkland, Marshall, New Hartford, Paris, Sangerfield, Sherrill, Utica, Vernon, Verona (part; also 21st; includes part of Verona CDP), Westmoreland, Whitestown

Onondaga County (20)

All 20 municipalities and cities

== List of members representing the district ==
=== 1821–1833: one seat ===
District was created on March 4, 1821, split from the 2-seat 21st district.

Member	Party	Years	Cong ress	Electoral history	Location
District established March 4, 1821
Vacant		March 4, 1821 – December 3, 1821	17th	Elections were held in April 1821. It is unclear when results were announced or credentials issued.	1821–1823 [data missing]
Albert H. Tracy (Buffalo)	Democratic-Republican	December 3, 1821 – March 3, 1823	17th	Elected in 1821. Redistricted to the 30th district.	1821–1823 [data missing]
Justin Dwinell (Cazenovia)	Democratic-Republican	March 4, 1823 – March 3, 1825	18th	Elected in 1822. [data missing]	1823–1833; Madison and Cortland counties
John Miller (Truxton)	Anti-Jacksonian	March 4, 1825 – March 3, 1827	19th	Elected in 1824. [data missing]	1823–1833; Madison and Cortland counties
John G. Stower (Hamilton)	Jacksonian	March 4, 1827 – March 3, 1829	20th	Elected in 1826. [data missing]	1823–1833; Madison and Cortland counties
Thomas Beekman (Peterboro)	Anti-Jacksonian	March 4, 1829 – March 3, 1831	21st	Elected in 1828. [data missing]	1823–1833; Madison and Cortland counties
Edward C. Reed (Homer)	Jacksonian	March 4, 1831 – March 3, 1833	22nd	Elected in 1830. [data missing]	1823–1833; Madison and Cortland counties

=== 1833–1843: two seats ===
From 1833 to 1843, two seats were apportioned, elected at-large on a general ticket.

Years	Cong ress	Seat A			Seat B		
Years	Cong ress	Representative	Party	Electoral history	Representative	Party	Electoral history
March 4, 1833 – March 3, 1835	23rd	Nicoll Halsey (Trumansburg)	Jacksonian	Elected in 1832. [data missing]	Samuel G. Hathaway (Solon)	Jacksonian	Elected in 1832. [data missing]
March 4, 1835 – March 3, 1837	24th	Stephen B. Leonard (Owego)	Jacksonian	Elected in 1834. [data missing]	Joseph Reynolds (Virgil)	Jacksonian	Elected in 1834. [data missing]
March 4, 1837 – July 27, 1838	25th	Andrew DeWitt Bruyn (Ithaca)	Democratic	Elected in 1836. Died.	Hiram Gray (Elmira)	Democratic	Elected in 1836. [data missing]
July 27, 1838 – December 3, 1838	25th	Vacant			Hiram Gray (Elmira)	Democratic	Elected in 1836. [data missing]
December 3, 1838 – March 3, 1839	25th	Cyrus Beers (Ithaca)	Democratic	Elected to finish Bruyn's term. [data missing]	Hiram Gray (Elmira)	Democratic	Elected in 1836. [data missing]
March 4, 1839 – March 3, 1841	26th	Stephen B. Leonard (Owego)	Democratic	Elected in 1838. [data missing]	Amasa Dana (Ithaca)	Democratic	Elected in 1838. [data missing]
March 4, 1841 – March 3, 1843	27th	Samuel Partridge (Elmira)	Democratic	Elected in 1840. [data missing]	Lewis Riggs (Homer)	Democratic	Elected in 1840. [data missing]

=== 1843–present: one seat ===
Member	Party	Years	Cong ress	Electoral history	District map
Meade Purdy (Norwich)	Democratic	March 4, 1843 – March 3, 1845	28th	Elected in 1842. [data missing]	
Stephen Strong (Owego)	Democratic	March 4, 1845 – March 3, 1847	29th	Elected in 1844. [data missing]	
Ausburn Birdsall (Binghamton)	Democratic	March 4, 1847 – March 3, 1849	30th	Elected in 1846. [data missing]	
Henry Bennett (New Berlin)	Whig	March 4, 1849 – March 3, 1853	31st 32nd	Elected in 1848. Re-elected in 1850. Redistricted to the 21st district.	
Gerrit Smith (Peterboro)	Free Soil	March 4, 1853 – August 7, 1854	33rd	Elected in 1852. Resigned.	
Vacant		August 7, 1854 – November 7, 1854	33rd		
Henry C. Goodwin (Hamilton)	Whig	November 7, 1854 – March 3, 1855	33rd	Elected to finish Smith's term. [data missing]	
Andrew Z. McCarty (Pulaski)	Opposition	March 4, 1855 – March 3, 1857	34th	Elected in 1854. [data missing]	
Henry C. Goodwin (Hamilton)	Republican	March 4, 1857 – March 3, 1859	35th	Elected in 1856. [data missing]	
M. Lindley Lee (Fulton)	Republican	March 4, 1859 – March 3, 1861	36th	Elected in 1858. [data missing]	
William E. Lansing (Chittenango)	Republican	March 4, 1861 – March 3, 1863	37th	Elected in 1860. [data missing]	
De Witt C. Littlejohn (Oswego)	Republican	March 4, 1863 – March 3, 1865	38th	Elected in 1862. [data missing]	
Sidney T. Holmes (Morrisville)	Republican	March 4, 1865 – March 3, 1867	39th	Elected in 1864. [data missing]	
John C. Churchill (Oswego)	Republican	March 4, 1867 – March 3, 1871	40th 41st	Elected in 1866. Re-elected in 1868. [data missing]	
William E. Lansing (Chittenango)	Republican	March 4, 1871 – March 3, 1873	42nd	Elected in 1870. Redistricted to the 23rd district.	
Ellis H. Roberts (Utica)	Republican	March 4, 1873 – March 3, 1875	43rd	Redistricted from the 21st district and re-elected in 1872. [data missing]	
George A. Bagley (Watertown)	Republican	March 4, 1875 – March 3, 1879	44th 45th	Elected in 1874. Re-elected in 1876. [data missing]	
Warner Miller (Herkimer)	Republican	March 4, 1879 – July 26, 1881	46th 47th	Elected in 1878. Re-elected in 1880. Resigned when elected to US Senate	
Vacant		July 26, 1881 – November 8, 1881	47th		
Charles R. Skinner (Watertown)	Republican	November 8, 1881 – March 3, 1885	47th 48th	Elected to finish Miller's term. Re-elected in 1882. [data missing]	
Abraham X. Parker (Potsdam)	Republican	March 4, 1885 – March 3, 1889	49th 50th	Redistricted from the 19th district and re-elected in 1884. Re-elected in 1886.	
Frederick Lansing (Watertown)	Republican	March 4, 1889 – March 3, 1891	51st	Elected in 1888. [data missing]	
Leslie W. Russell (Ogdensburg)	Republican	March 4, 1891 – September 11, 1891	52nd	Elected in 1890. Resigned when elected as justice on New York Supreme Court	
Vacant		September 11, 1891 – November 3, 1891	52nd		
N. Martin Curtis (Ogdensburg)	Republican	November 3, 1891 – March 3, 1897	52nd 53rd 54th	Elected to finish Russell's term. Re-elected in 1892. Re-elected in 1894. [data missing]	
Lucius N. Littauer (Gloversville)	Republican	March 4, 1897 – March 3, 1903	55th 56th 57th	Elected in 1896. Re-elected in 1898. Re-elected in 1900. Redistricted to the 25th district.	
William H. Draper (Troy)	Republican	March 4, 1903 – March 3, 1913	58th 59th 60th 61st 62nd	Redistricted from the 19th district and re-elected in 1902. Re-elected in 1904. Re-elected in 1906. Re-elected in 1908. Re-elected in 1910. [data missing]	
Henry Bruckner (New York)	Democratic	March 4, 1913 – December 31, 1917	63rd 64th 65th	Elected in 1912. Re-elected in 1914. Re-elected in 1916. Resigned.	
Vacant		December 31, 1917 – March 5, 1918	65th		
Anthony J. Griffin (New York)	Democratic	March 5, 1918 – January 13, 1935	65th 66th 67th 68th 69th 70th 71st 72nd 73rd 74th	Elected in 1918. Re-elected in 1920. Re-elected in 1922. Re-elected in 1924. Re-elected in 1926. Re-elected in 1928. Re-elected in 1930. Re-elected in 1932. Re-elected in 1934. Died.	
Vacant		January 13, 1935 – November 5, 1935	74th		
Edward W. Curley (The Bronx)	Democratic	November 5, 1935 – January 6, 1940	74th 75th 76th	Elected to finish Griffin's term. Re-elected in 1936. Re-elected in 1938. Died.	
Vacant		January 6, 1940 – February 20, 1940	76th		
Walter A. Lynch (New York)	Democratic	February 20, 1940 – January 3, 1945	76th 77th 78th	Elected to finish Curley's term. Re-elected in 1940. Re-elected in 1942. Redistricted to the 23rd district.	
Adam Clayton Powell Jr. (New York)	Democratic	January 3, 1945 – January 3, 1953	79th 80th 81st 82nd	Elected in 1944. Re-elected in 1946. Re-elected in 1948. Re-elected in 1950. Redistricted to the 16th district.	
Sidney A. Fine (New York)	Democratic	January 3, 1953 – January 2, 1956	83rd 84th	Redistricted from the 23rd district and re-elected in 1952. Re-elected in 1954. Resigned to serve on New York Supreme Court.	
Vacant		January 2, 1956 – February 7, 1956	84th		
James C. Healey (New York)	Democratic	February 7, 1956 – January 3, 1963	84th 85th 86th 87th	Elected to finish Fine's term. Re-elected in 1956. Re-elected in 1958. Re-elected in 1960. Redistricted to the 21st district.	
Jacob H. Gilbert (The Bronx)	Democratic	January 3, 1963 – January 3, 1971	88th 89th 90th 91st	Redistricted from the 23rd district and re-elected in 1962. Re-elected in 1964. Re-elected in 1966. Re-elected in 1968. [data missing]	
Herman Badillo (The Bronx)	Democratic	January 3, 1971 – January 3, 1973	92nd	Elected in 1970. Redistricted to the 21st district.	
Jonathan B. Bingham (The Bronx)	Democratic	January 3, 1973 – January 3, 1983	93rd 94th 95th 96th 97th	Redistricted from the 23rd district and re-elected in 1972. Re-elected in 1974. Re-elected in 1976. Re-elected in 1978. Re-elected in 1980. [data missing]	
Benjamin Gilman (Middletown)	Republican	January 3, 1983 – January 3, 1993	98th 99th 100th 101st 102nd	Redistricted from the 26th district and re-elected in 1982. Re-elected in 1984. Re-elected in 1986. Re-elected in 1988. Re-elected in 1990. Redistricted to the 20th district.	
Gerald Solomon (Glens Falls)	Republican	January 3, 1993 – January 3, 1999	103rd 104th 105th	Redistricted from the 24th district and re-elected in 1992. Re-elected in 1994. Re-elected in 1996. [data missing]	
John E. Sweeney (Clifton Park)	Republican	January 3, 1999 – January 3, 2003	106th 107th	Elected in 1998. Re-elected in 2000. Redistricted to the 20th district.	
Maurice Hinchey (Saugerties)	Democratic	January 3, 2003 – January 3, 2013	108th 109th 110th 111th 112th	Redistricted from the 26th district and re-elected in 2002. Re-elected in 2004. Re-elected in 2006. Re-elected in 2008. Re-elected in 2010. Retired.	2003–2013
Richard Hanna (Barneveld)	Republican	January 3, 2013 – January 3, 2017	113th 114th	Redistricted from the 24th district and re-elected in 2012. Re-elected in 2014. Retired.	2013–2023
Claudia Tenney (New Hartford)	Republican	January 3, 2017 – January 3, 2019	115th	Elected in 2016. Lost re-election.	2013–2023
Anthony Brindisi (Utica)	Democratic	January 3, 2019 – January 3, 2021	116th	Elected in 2018. Lost re-election.	2013–2023
Vacant		January 3, 2021 – February 11, 2021	117th	Election disputed.	2013–2023
Claudia Tenney (New Hartford)	Republican	February 11, 2021 – January 3, 2023	117th	Elected in 2020. Redistricted to the 24th district.	2013–2023
Brandon Williams (Syracuse)	Republican	January 3, 2023 – January 3, 2025	118th	Elected in 2022. Lost re-election.	2023–2025
John Mannion (Geddes)	Democratic	January 3, 2025 – present	119th	Elected in 2024. Re-elected in 2026.	2025–present

== Election results ==
In New York State electoral politics there are numerous minor parties at various points on the political spectrum. Certain parties will invariably endorse either the Republican or Democratic candidate for every office, hence the state electoral results contain both the party votes, and the final candidate votes (Listed as "Recap").

1996 United States House of Representatives elections in New York: District 22
Party	Candidate	Votes	%
Republican	Gerald B.H. Solomon (Incumbent)	144,125	60.5
Democratic	Steve James	94,192	39.5
Margin of victory		49,933	21.0
Turnout		238,317	?
Republican hold			

1998 United States House of Representatives elections in New York: District 22
Party	Candidate	Votes	%	±%
Republican	John E. Sweeney	106,919	55.3	−5.2
Democratic	Jean P. Bordewich	81,296	42.1	+2.6
Right to Life	Francis A. Giroux	5,051	2.6	+2.6
Margin of victory		25,623	13.3	−7.7
Turnout		193,266	?	−18.9
Republican hold		Swing	?	

2000 United States House of Representatives elections in New York: District 22
Party	Candidate	Votes	%	±%
Republican	John E. Sweeney (Incumbent)	167,368	67.9	+12.6
Democratic	Kenneth F. McCallion	79,111	32.1	−10.0
Margin of victory		88,257	35.8	+22.5
Turnout		246,479	?	+27.5
Republican hold		Swing	?	

2002 United States House of Representatives elections in New York: District 22
Party	Candidate	Votes	%	±%
Democratic	Maurice Hinchey (Incumbent)	113,280	64.2	+32.1
Republican	Eric Hall	58,008	32.9	−35.0
Green	Steve Greenfield	2,723	1.5	+1.5
Right to Life	Paul J. Laux	2,473	1.4	+1.4
Margin of victory		55,272	31.3	−4.5
Turnout		176,484	?	−28.4
Democratic gain from Republican		Swing	?	

2004 United States House of Representatives elections in New York: District 22
Party	Candidate	Votes	%	±%
Democratic	Maurice Hinchey (Incumbent)	167,489	67.2	+3.0
Republican	William A. Brenner	81,881	32.8	−0.1
Margin of victory		85,608	34.3	+3.0
Turnout		249,370	?	+41.3
Democratic hold		Swing	?	

2006 United States House of Representatives elections in New York: District 22
Party	Candidate	Votes	%	±%
Democratic	Maurice Hinchey (Incumbent)	121,683	100.0	+32.8
Margin of victory		121,683	100.0	+65.7
Turnout		121,683	?	−51.2
Democratic hold		Swing	?	

2008 United States House of Representatives elections in New York: District 22
Party	Candidate	Votes	%	±%
Democratic	Maurice Hinchey (Incumbent)	168,558	58.1	−41.9
Republican	George Phillips	85,126	29.3	+29.3
Margin of victory		83,432	28.8	−41.9
Turnout		290,102	?	+138
Democratic hold		Swing	?	

2010 United States House of Representatives elections in New York: District 22
Party	Candidate	Votes	%	±%
Democratic	Maurice Hinchey (Incumbent)	90,613	52.4	−5.7
Republican	George Phillips	82,385	47.6	+18.3
Margin of victory		8,228	4.8	−24.4
Turnout		172,998	?	−59.6
Democratic hold		Swing	?	

2012 United States House of Representatives elections in New York: District 22
Party	Candidate	Votes	%	±%
Republican	Richard L. Hanna (Incumbent)	157,941	60.7	+13.1
Democratic	Dan Lamb	102,080	39.3	−12.9
Margin of victory		55,861	21.4	−15.2
Turnout		280,082	?	N/A
Republican gain from Democratic		Swing	?	

2014 United States House of Representatives elections in New York: District 22
Party	Candidate	Votes	%	±%
Republican	Richard L. Hanna (Incumbent)	129,851	100.0	+39.3
Margin of victory		129,851	100.0	N/A
Turnout		175,372	?	N/A
Republican hold		Swing	?	

2016 United States House of Representatives elections in New York: District 22
Party	Candidate	Votes	%	±%
Republican	Claudia Tenney	129,444	46.5	−53.5
Democratic	Kim Myers	114,266	41.1	N/A
Upstate Jobs	Martin Babinec	34,638	12.4	N/A
Margin of victory		15,278	5.4	N/A
Turnout		278,348	?	N/A
Republican hold		Swing	?	

2018 United States House of Representatives elections in New York: District 22
Party	Candidate	Votes	%	±%
Democratic	Anthony Brindisi	127,715	50.9	+9.8
Republican	Claudia Tenney (Incumbent)	123,242	49.1	+2.6
Margin of victory		4,473	1.8	N/A
Turnout		250,957	?	N/A
Democratic gain from Republican		Swing	?	

2020 United States House of Representatives elections in New York: District 22
Party	Candidate	Votes	%	±%
Republican	Claudia Tenney	156,098	48.84	−0.166
Democratic	Anthony Brindisi (Incumbent)	155,989	48.80	−2.0
Libertarian	Keith Price	6,780	2.125	N/A
Write-in		771	0.24	N/A
Margin of victory		109	0.034	N/A
Turnout		318,998	?	N/A
Republican gain from Democratic		Swing	?	

2022 United States House of Representatives elections in New York: District 22
Party	Candidate	Votes	%	±%
Republican	Brandon Williams	135,544	50.46	+1.62
Democratic	Francis Conole	132,913	49.48	+0.68
Write-in		151	0.06	N/A
Margin of victory		2,631	0.98	N/A
Turnout		268,608	?	N/A
Republican hold		Swing	?	

2024 United States House of Representatives elections in New York: District 22
Party	Candidate	Votes	%	±%
Democratic	John Mannion	178,394	50.1	
Working Families	John Mannion	16,056	4.5	
Total	John Mannion	194,450	54.6	
Republican	Brandon Williams	142,082	39.9	
Conservative	Brandon Williams	19,857	5.6	
Total	Brandon Williams (incumbent)	161,939	45.4	
Total votes		356,389	100.0	
Democratic gain from Republican				

== See also ==
- List of United States congressional districts
- New York's congressional delegations
- New York's congressional districts
