= American Oversight =

US non-profit organization

- Founded: March 13, 2017; 9 years ago
- Legal status: 501(c)(3) organization
- Headquarters: Washington, D.C., US
- Executive Director: Chioma Chukwu
- Revenue: $7.33 million (2024)
- Expenses: $6.43 million (2024)
- Website: americanoversight.org

American Oversight is a non-profit watchdog organization based in Washington, D.C. The organization was founded in 2017 in response to the first Trump administration. The organization has served as part of the legal opposition to both the first and second Trump administrations, primarily through litigation against federal agencies and public record requests, among other legal means.

In the group's 2025 lawsuit against Secretary of Defense Pete Hegseth, American Oversight v. Hegseth, they described their overarching goal as being "committed to promoting transparency in government, educating the public about government activities, and ensuring the accountability of government officials." Officially a non-partisan and independent organization, it was described at its inception as having ties to the Democratic Party. The group has also been described in news sources as liberal and left-leaning.

== History ==
American Oversight was founded in March 2017 by a group of lawyers in response to the first Trump administration. One of the founders and executive director of the organization at the time, Austin Evers, described the group as being "troubled" by the recently inaugurated administration. Further describing the organization's actions, Evers, who had served as senior counsel to the Department of State during the Obama administration, said that they would "be using the tools available" so that "voters can hold their government accountable." One of the founders of the group was Melanie Sloan, who currently serves as Senior Adviser.

Evers stepped down from his role as executive director in 2022 to work in the Biden administration to respond to legislative oversight. After his resignation, Heather Sawyer became the executive director of American Oversight. She stepped down by April 2024, and was succeeded by deputy executive director Chioma Chukwu as the interim executive director.

== Activities ==
In 2017, American Oversight began a FOIA request against the Department of Health and Human Services (HHS) and the Office of Management and Budget (OMB) for communications between the agencies and members of Congress relating to healthcare reform. The same year, the organization, along with the Brennan Center for Justice and the Center for American Progress, called on the Inspector General Michael E. Horowitz to investigate potential misconduct in the firing of James Comey. They also requested records to see about the veracity of Trump's tweets with regards to his allegations of the Obama administration wiretapping Trump Tower during the 2016 election. After further pressing on the issue, they received a DOJ court filing stating that "both the FBI and NSD confirm that they have no records related to wiretaps as described by the March 4, 2017 tweets."

Later on, in response to the scandal in February 2018 involving Housing and Urban Development secretary Ben Carson, American Oversight sued to determine the exact amount that was spent for the office furnishing. The same year, the group, together with Citizens for Responsibility and Ethics in Washington (CREW), called on the Trump administration to stop the destruction of presidential records.

American Oversight, along with Democracy Forward, filed a lawsuit in 2019 against Secretary of State Mike Pompeo and the State Department after the seizure of interpreter notes between Trump and Russian president Vladimir Putin at the 2017 G20 Hamburg summit. The State Department, later in 2019, would release, in response to American Oversight's requests, nearly 100 pages in records dealing with Trump's interactions with Ukraine in light of the 2019 Trump–Ukraine scandal.

In 2020, the organization was able to obtain the release of Postmaster General Louis DeJoy's calendar after his implementation of policy changes that greatly slowed mail delivery times ahead of the 2020 election.

In 2021, the organization secured the release of more 80,000 pages of records regarding the state of Arizona's attempts to audit the 2020 results, which revealed widescale issues with the audit, including partisan bias and the involvement of conspiracy theorists in the ballot count. This would be followed by them filing suit against the state of Texas after announcing a forensic audit of several major counties' vote count during the 2020 election.

In 2023, American Oversight was able to release records surrounding the attempts by the state of Florida's attempt to revise school curricula, including revealing attempts to revise the curriculum on courses about African-American history on the basis that it did not represent "opposing viewpoints" on slavery, as well as restrictions on textbooks for various subjects.

On February 11, 2025, American Oversight filed a lawsuit against the Trump administration for records relating to the Department of Government Efficiency (DOGE), after the administration claimed that the entity was not subject to FOIA requests.

On March 28, the organization filed an order with the United States District Court for the District of Columbia for the preservation of text messages sent by cabinet secretaries through Signal which leaked that same month. The case that followed, docketed as American Oversight v. Hegseth, is currently being presided over by Chief Judge James Boasberg.

In May 2025, American Oversight filed a lawsuit against the Internal Revenue Service (IRS) and the Department of Education for the withholding of records regarding the administration's actions against Harvard University, including threats from Donald Trump to revoke Harvard's tax-exempt status.
