= Ben Carson office furnishing scandal =

Scandal at the US Department of Housing and Urban Development

On February 27, 2018, it was reported that the U.S. Department of Housing and Urban Development had spent $31,561 on a set of dining room furniture for the office of HUD secretary Ben Carson in late 2017, in apparent violation of federal law requiring Congressional approval for department head office redecoration costs exceeding $5,000. Emails released under the Freedom of Information Act (FOIA) contradicted initial agency statements that the Secretary was uninvolved in the purchase decision, which took place amid extensive proposed budget cuts at that agency, affecting programs benefiting the poor and elderly. Media coverage of the purchase led to its cancellation. Inquiries into the propriety of the purchase were made by the Office of Special Counsel and House Oversight Committee.

The news of the office expenditures came amid questions over Carson's son's involvement in a HUD-sponsored "listening tour". Ben Carson Jr. is a federal contractor, and HUD lawyers warned the secretary that his involvement would constitute an apparent conflict of interest in violation of federal ethics rules; in February, Secretary Carson was pressured into requesting an investigation of his son's involvement by the inspector general of HUD.

HUD's inspector general cleared Carson of misconduct in September 2019.

== Events ==
=== Furniture order ===
The custom-made furniture, ordered on December 21 from Sebree and Associates based in Carson's hometown of Baltimore, included a mahogany table, ten chairs with velvet upholstery, a sideboard, and a hutch. According to purchase documents and the dealer, the table pedestals featured "hand applied ebonized inlay with bell flowers topped by hand carved scrolls and a fluted column." Delivery was scheduled for May 2018.

=== Internal whistleblowing ===
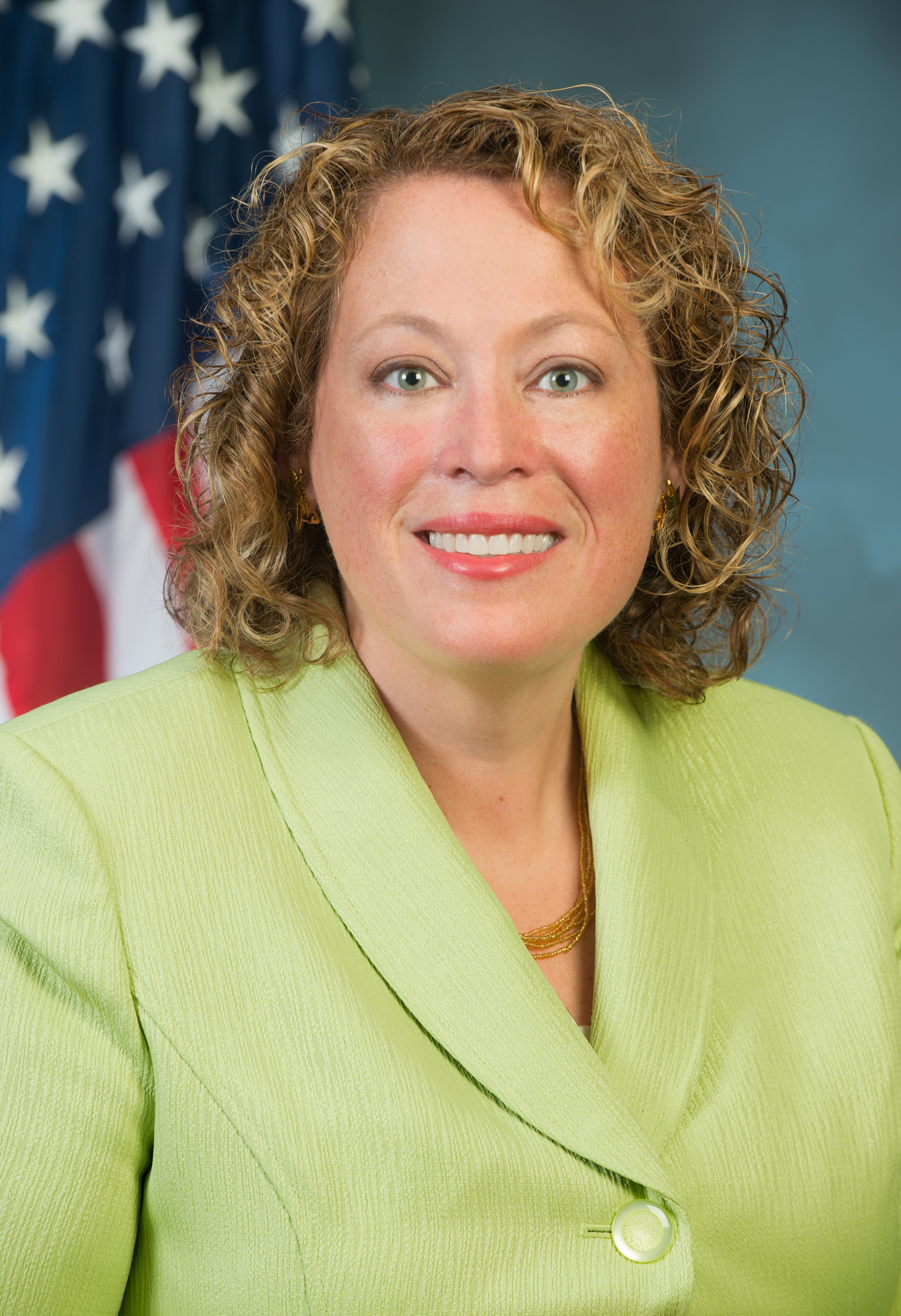
Helen Foster, former Chief Administrative Officer at HUD, who filed a whistleblower complaint

In November 2017, Helen G. Foster, former chief administrative officer at HUD, filed a whistleblower complaint with the Office of Special Counsel, alleging that she had been demoted and transferred as retaliation after refusing to secure funding for the redecoration of the Secretary's office, as well as for exposing a $10 million budget shortfall, and for protesting being barred from handling certain FOIA requests. Foster stated that, beginning prior to Carson's confirmation in March, she had been repeatedly pressured by Carson's wife Candy Carson, through interim secretary Craig Clemmensen, to secure the funding in violation of the law. After conferring with HUD's acting assistant chief financial officer for budget on February 13, Foster claimed to have sent HUD officials the text of the Antideficiency Act requiring Congressional approval of the purchase. She reported being told "$5,000 will not even buy a decent chair."

A February 22 memo from HUD's chief financial officer reiterated the rules surrounding redecoration costs, as well as costs associated with securing Secretary Carson's home.

=== Public statements from HUD officials ===
On February 27, following initial media reports, HUD spokesman Raffi Williams initially claimed that HUD had spent only $3,200 for new blinds for the secretary and deputy secretary's offices, and that the chairs then in the secretary's office had come from the basement of the HUD building. That same day, the organization American Oversight sued HUD to determine how much money had actually been spent on office redecoration.

On the evening of February 28, Carson and his wife denied any wrongdoing via Twitter. Carson claimed to be "as surprised as anyone" about the purchase.

Williams claimed that Secretary Carson and his wife had not requested the new table and were unaware of its purchase, and that the purchasing decision was made by career staffers, but that the secretary did not believe the cost to be excessive, and did not intend to return the items. However, internal emails released on March 14 – under a FOIA request made by American Oversight – contradicted those claims, with one message from a career staffer to Carson's assistant referring to "printouts of the furniture the Secretary and Mrs. Carson picked out". Presented with the discrepancy, Williams acknowledged that "when presented with options by professional staff, Mrs. Carson participated in the selection of specific styles."

Williams claimed that Congressional approval was not sought for the purchase because it addressed a "building-wide need", though the dining set would be located in Carson's personal suite. He also claimed that Foster's reassignment was part of a normal rotation.

On March 1, HUD confirmed that Carson had requested the furniture order be cancelled. HUD announced on March 15 that its chief financial officer Irving Dennis would lead a task force to combat "waste, fraud and abuse" at the agency.

On March 19, Carson testified before the House Appropriations Committee, claiming that he left the purchasing decision to his wife, and that they expressed concerns to staff over the cost. He denied that the furniture constituted a decorating expense, citing apparent safety concerns with the state of the old furniture, and he denied knowing about whistleblower Helen Foster. Congressman David Price, Democrat from North Carolina and ranking member of the committee, called the purchase one of several "major ethical lapses" at HUD, citing "failure to control funds and provide legally required notifications to Congress", "apparently false public statements that intended to obscure the truth about the secretary's involvement", and "the reassignment of the whistleblower who brought these problems to the public's attention."

=== Government investigations ===
Following her initial complaint, Helen Foster was contacted for an interview with the Office of Special Counsel, which has 120 days from the date of the complaint to determine whether it will launch an official investigation. Foster's lawyer, Joe Kaplan, said the OSC could determine to move forward as quickly as the week of March 1.

Trey Gowdy, Republican chairman of the House Oversight Committee, requested records relating to HUD's furniture purchases in 2017, to "determine whether HUD adhered to the applicable spending limitations", as well as documentation relating to Helen Foster's claims of retaliation. Gowdy set a deadline of March 14 for the delivery of these documents.

In May 2019, the Government Accountability Office's general counsel confirmed to Congress that HUD participated in illegal spending with the purchase of the dining set and a new dishwasher and water treatment system, specifically violating section 710 of the Financial Services and General Government Appropriations Acts of 2016 and 2017, and the Antideficiency Act.

On September 12, 2019, HUD's inspector general released a report clearing Carson of misconduct.

== Other reactions ==
The White House was reportedly "furious" about negative stories surrounding spending at HUD, and anonymous sources reported the White House was taking a more active role to address the matter.

Editorials strongly criticized HUD's purchases and Carson's reaction. Vanity Fair called Carson's claimed lack of awareness of the purchase "truly amazing". The Baltimore Sun called the scandal part of a pattern in which Trump administration officials "shamelessly gamed the system for their personal benefit".

Late-night comedians mocked the purchase and HUD's response. Trevor Noah of The Daily Show said that valuing a good chair at $5,000 would make Carson "the worst Price Is Right contestant", and suggested the department use the money to build low-income housing instead, in accordance with its mission. Late Night host Seth Meyers said of Carson that "the man loves furniture. Based on his personality he’s probably been mistaken for furniture."
