= Thomas Beekman =

American politician

Member of the U.S. House of Representatives from New York's 22nd district
- In office March 4, 1829 – March 3, 1831
- Preceded by: John G. Stower
- Succeeded by: Edward C. Reed

Personal details
- Born: July 4, 1790 Kinderhook, New York, United States
- Died: February 2, 1870 (aged 79) Kinderhook, New York, US
- Party: Anti-Jacksonian; Anti-Masonic
- Spouse: Lydia Van Schaack Beekman
- Parent(s): John T. Beekman; Annatje Pruyn
- Relatives: John P. Beekman (brother)
- Profession: lawyer, farmer, politician

Thomas Beekman (July 4, 1790 – February 2, 1870) was an American politician and a U.S. Representative from New York.

== Biography ==
Beekman was born in Kinderhook, New York to John J. Beekman and Annatje Pruyn. His elder brother was Dr. John Pruyn Beekman (1788–1861), a member of the New York State Senate from 1845 to 1847.

Beekman studied law and became an attorney and farmer in Smithfield and later Peterboro.

== Career ==
Beekman served in local offices including as a town clerk, and was active in the militia as aide-de-camp to the commander of its 17th Division. Beekman was also active in the Anti-Masonic movement of the 1820s and 1830s.

Elected as an Anti-Jacksonian to the Twenty-first Congress, Beekman was U. S. Representative for the twenty-second district of New York and served one term, from March 4, 1829, to March 3, 1831. In 1831 he was an unsuccessful Anti-Masonic candidate for the New York State Senate.

Beekman later moved back to Kinderhook, where he farmed, practiced law, was active in several businesses, including the Kinderhook National Bank, and served as Columbia County Excise Commissioner from 1857 to 1859. After his retirement in the 1860s he spent summers in Kinderhook and winters living with his daughter in New York City.

He was married to Lydia Van Schaack.

== Death ==
Beekman died in Kinderhook on February 2, 1870.

U.S. House of Representatives
Preceded by John G. Stower	Member of the U.S. House of Representatives from New York's 22nd congressional district March 4, 1829 – March 3, 1831	Succeeded by Edward C. Reed
