= Craig Clemmensen =

American government official

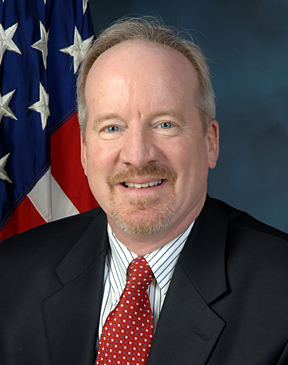

Acting United States Secretary of Housing and Urban Development
- In office January 20, 2017 – March 2, 2017
- President: Donald Trump
- Preceded by: Julian Castro
- Succeeded by: Ben Carson

Personal details
- Party: Republican
- Education: Rider University (BA)

Craig T. Clemmensen is an American government official serving as Director of the United States Department of Housing and Urban Development's Departmental Enforcement Center. He was Acting Secretary of Housing and Urban Development from late January to early March 2017 during the transition of the Trump Administration. He is a member of the Republican Party.

He has worked in the Department of Housing and Urban Development since 1998, initially as part of the management team that established the Departmental Enforcement Center. He moved to the Federal Housing Administration Office of Housing in 2002, and then returned to the Departmental Enforcement Center as its director in May 2010. He holds a bachelor's degree from Rider University.

Political offices
Preceded by Julián Castro	United States Secretary of Housing and Urban Development; Acting; 2017	Succeeded by Ben Carson
