= John and Mary Dickson House =

Historic house in New York, United States

- U.S. National Register of Historic Places
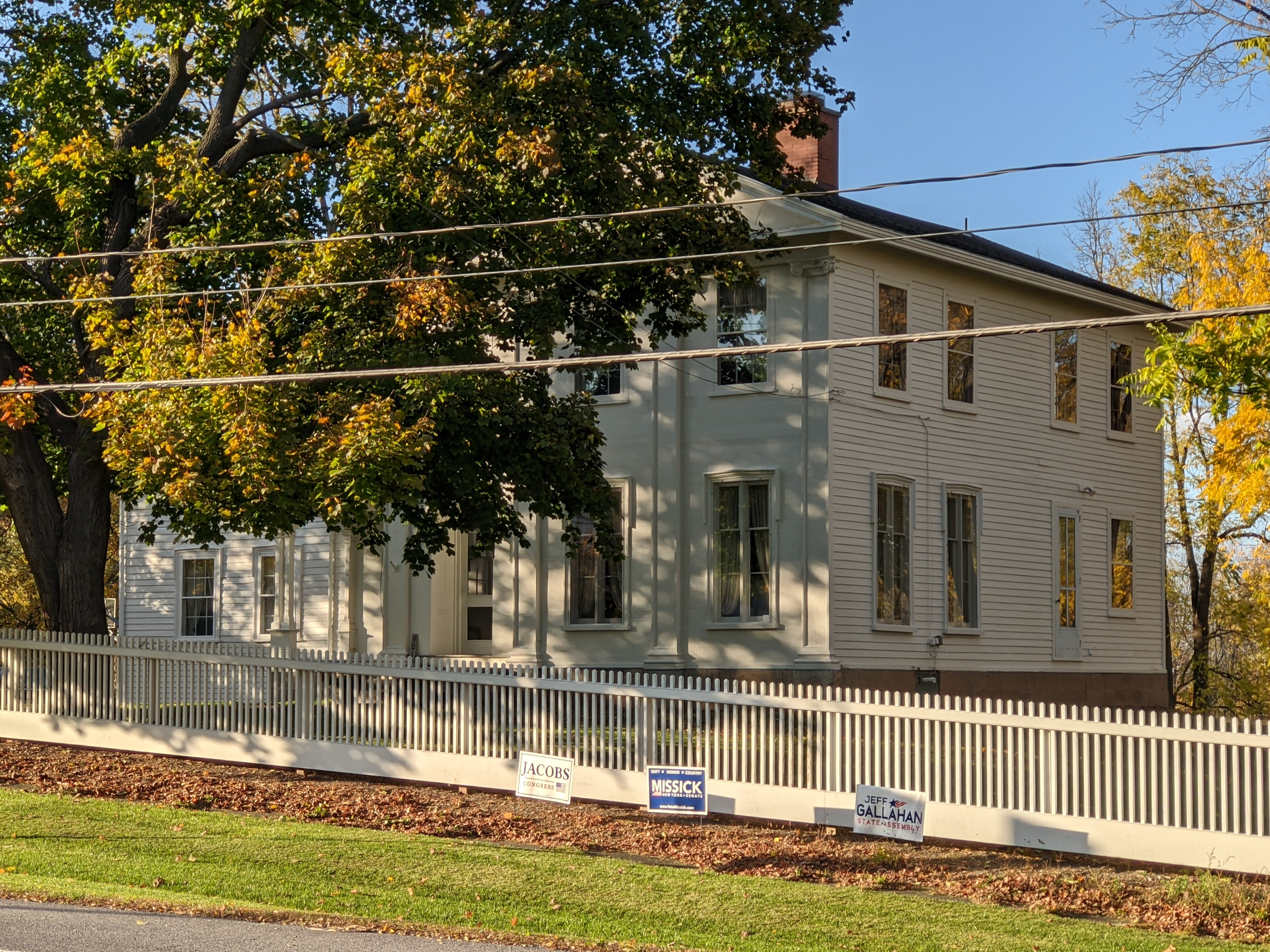

- Location within New York Location within the United States
- Location: 9010 Main St., West Bloomfield, New York
- Coordinates: 42°54′20″N 77°32′19″W
- Area: 9 acres (3.6 ha)
- Built: 1835; 191 years ago
- Architectural style: Federal
- NRHP reference No.: 08001077
- Added to NRHP: November 19, 2008; 17 years ago

John and Mary Dickson House is a historic home located at West Bloomfield in Ontario County, New York. It is an L-shaped, heavy timer-framed dwelling built about 1835 in a late Federal / early Greek Revival style. It was built by John Dickson (1783–1852), a prominent local lawyer and member of the U.S. House of Representatives.

It was listed on the National Register of Historic Places in 2008.
