= John P. Beekman =

American politician

Member of the New York State Senate
- In office January 1, 1845 – December 31, 1847
- Preceded by: Henry W. Strong
- Succeeded by: District abolished

Personal details
- Born: March 13, 1788 Kinderhook, New York
- Died: October 16, 1861 (aged 73) Kinderhook, New York
- Citizenship: United States
- Party: Anti-Jacksonian; Anti-Masonic
- Spouse: Eliza Griffith Clark
- Children: 2
- Parent(s): John T. Beekman; Annatje Pruyn
- Relatives: Thomas Beekman (brother)
- Profession: Physician, farmer, banker, politician

John Pruyn Beekman (March 13, 1788 Kinderhook, Columbia County, New York – October 16, 1861 Kinderhook, New York) was an American medical doctor, farmer, banker and politician from New York.

== Life ==
He was the son of John J. Beekman (1761–1795) and Annetje (Pruyn) Beekman and was the older brother of Thomas Beekman (1790–1870), a member of the United States House of Representatives.

== Career ==
Beekman was a doctor who practiced medicine for about twenty years. He was also a wealthy landowner, President of the New York State Agricultural Society, and was President of the National Bank of Kinderhook, from its establishment in 1839 until his death in 1861.

He was a member of the New York State Senate (3rd D.) from 1845 to 1847, sitting in the 68th, 69th and 70th New York State Legislatures.

== Personal life ==
On May 19, 1821, he married Eliza Griffith Clark (1792–1875), and they had two daughters:

- Catherine Beekman (1822–1890), who died unmarried.
- Anna Rosalie Beeman (1824–1908), who died unmarried.

Beekman died on October 16, 1861.

== Sources ==
Notes

Sources

- The New York Civil List compiled by Franklin Benjamin Hough (pages 135, 140, 215, 224 and 272; Weed, Parsons and Co., 1858)
- Genealogies of New Jersey Families ("Eliza Clark", pg. 158)
- The Village of Kinderhook by Capt. Franklin Ellis (1878) transcribed at US Gen Net

New York State Senate
Preceded by Henry W. Strong	New York State Senate; Third District (Class 2); 1845 – 1847	Succeeded by district abolished
