= William Babcock (politician) =

American politician

Member of the U.S. House of Representatives from New York's 26th district
- In office March 4, 1831 – March 3, 1833
- Preceded by: Thomas Maxwell
- Succeeded by: John Dickson

Personal details
- Born: 1785 Hinsdale, New Hampshire, United States
- Died: October 20, 1838 (aged 52–53) Penn Yan, New York
- Party: Anti-Masonic Party
- Profession: Merchant; hotel keeper; politician

William Babcock (1785 – October 20, 1838) was an American politician and a U.S. representative from New York's twenty-sixth district.

== Biography ==
Born in Hinsdale, New Hampshire, Babcock attended the common schools.

== Career ==
Babcock moved to Penn Yan, New York, in 1813 and engaged in mercantile pursuits owning more that one store. Upon the formation of Yates County he was appointed by the Governor as the first county treasurer in 1823.

Elected as an Anti-Masonic candidate to the Twenty-second Congress, Babcock served as a U.S. Representative for the twenty-sixth district of New York from March 4, 1831 to March 3, 1833. Resuming his mercantile pursuits, he was also engaged as a hotel keeper.

== Death ==
Babcock died in Penn Yan, Yates County, New York, on October 20, 1838 (age about 53 years). He is interred at City Hill Cemetery, near Penn Yan, New York.

U.S. House of Representatives
Preceded by Thomas Maxwell	Representative of the 26th Congressional District of New York; March 4, 1831 – March 3, 1833	Succeeded by John Dickson
