= William L. Marcy =

American lawyer, politician, and judge (1786–1857)

William Marcy
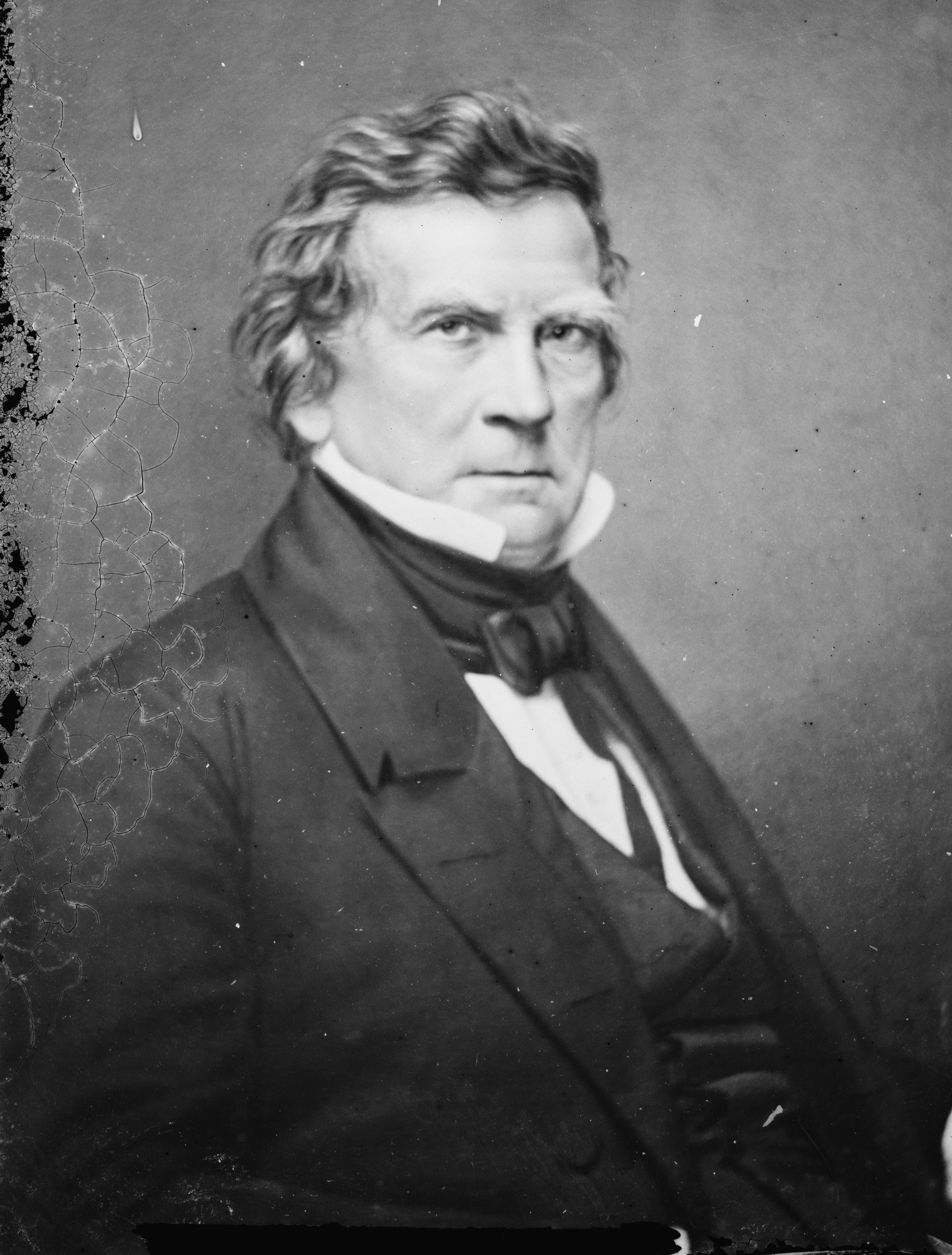
- Marcy c. 1856

21st United States Secretary of State
- In office March 7, 1853 – March 6, 1857
- President: Franklin Pierce; James Buchanan
- Preceded by: Edward Everett
- Succeeded by: Lewis Cass

20th United States Secretary of War
- In office March 6, 1845 – March 4, 1849
- President: James K. Polk
- Preceded by: William Wilkins
- Succeeded by: George W. Crawford

11th Governor of New York
- In office January 1, 1833 – December 31, 1838
- Lieutenant: John Tracy
- Preceded by: Enos T. Throop
- Succeeded by: William H. Seward

United States Senator from New York
- In office March 4, 1831 – January 1, 1833
- Preceded by: Nathan Sanford
- Succeeded by: Silas Wright

Associate Justice of the New York Supreme Court
- In office 1829 – March 4, 1831

8th Comptroller of New York
- In office February 13, 1823 – January 21, 1829
- Governor: Joseph C. Yates; DeWitt Clinton; Nathaniel Pitcher; Martin Van Buren
- Preceded by: John Savage
- Succeeded by: Silas Wright

Personal details
- Born: William Learned Marcy; December 12, 1786 Southbridge, Massachusetts
- Died: July 4, 1857 (aged 70) Ballston Spa, New York, U.S.
- Resting place: Albany Rural Cemetery
- Party: Democratic-Republican (before 1825); Democratic (after 1825)
- Spouse(s): Dolly Newell; Cornelia Knower
- Children: 3
- Education: Brown University (BA)

Military service
- Allegiance: United States
- Branch/service: New York State Militia
- Years of service: 1812–1823
- Rank: Brigadier General
- Commands: Adjutant General of New York
- Battles/wars: War of 1812

William Learned Marcy (December 12, 1786 – July 4, 1857) was an American lawyer and politician from New York. He served as a Justice of the New York Supreme Court, Comptroller of New York, Governor of New York, U.S. Senator, U.S. Secretary of War, and U.S. Secretary of State. In the latter office, he negotiated the Gadsden Purchase, the last major acquisition of land in the contiguous United States.

Born in Southbridge, Massachusetts, Marcy established a legal practice in Troy, New York, after graduating from Brown University. He fought in the War of 1812, as an ensign, first lieutenant and captain in the 155th New York Infantry Regiment. Politically, he aligned with the Bucktail faction of the Democratic-Republican Party and became a leading member of the Albany Regency. As the Democratic-Republicans fractured in the 1820s, he became a member of the Democratic Party. Between 1821 and 1831, he successively served as Adjutant General of New York, New York State Comptroller, and as an associate justice of the New York Supreme Court. In 1831, the New York legislature elected Marcy to the U.S. Senate, and he held that position until 1833, when he became the Governor of New York. He served three terms as governor until his defeat in 1838 by the Whig nominee, William Seward.

He served as Secretary of War under James K. Polk from 1845 to 1849, overseeing the Mexican–American War. After leaving the Polk administration, he resumed the practice of law and became a leader of the "Soft" Hunker faction of the New York Democratic Party. He returned to the Cabinet in 1853, serving as Secretary of State under Franklin Pierce. In this role, he resolved a dispute about the status of U.S. immigrants abroad and directed U.S. diplomats to dress in the plain style of an ordinary American rather than the court-dress many had adopted from Europe. He also negotiated a reciprocity treaty with British North America and the 30,000-square-mile (78,000 km^{2}) Gadsden purchase with Mexico, acquiring territory in present-day Arizona and New Mexico. He left office in 1857 and died shortly thereafter.

== Early life ==
William Learned Marcy was born in what is now Southbridge, Massachusetts, the son of farmer Jedediah Marcy and Ruth (Learned) Marcy. He attended schools in Leicester and graduated from The Woodstock Academy in Woodstock, Connecticut, before enrolling at Brown University, from which he graduated in 1808. After receiving his degree, Marcy, taught school in Dedham, Massachusetts and Newport, Rhode Island. He studied law with Troy, New York attorney William L. Bliss, was admitted to the bar in 1811, and began a practice in Troy. Marcy served in the militia during the War of 1812, first as an ensign in the 155th New York Infantry Regiment, and later advancing through the ranks to first lieutenant and captain. On October 22, 1812, he took part in the storming of the British post at St. Regis, Canada. He remained with the regiment after the war and attained the rank of lieutenant colonel as its second in command.

Afterward he served as Troy City Recorder from 1816 to 1818 and 1821 to 1823. As he sided with the Anti-Dewitt Clinton faction of the Democratic-Republican Party, known as the Bucktails, he was removed from office in 1818 after Clinton was elected governor. He was the editor of the Troy Budget newspaper.

In 1812, Marcy married Dolly Newell of Southbridge, who died in 1821. On April 28, 1824, he married Cornelia Knower (1801–1889, daughter of Benjamin Knower) at the Knower House in Guilderland, New York. They had three children: Samuel (1820–1862), Edmund (1832–1853), and Cornelia (1834–1888). Samuel Marcy was a United States Navy officer who was killed on board the USS Vincennes during the American Civil War. Edmund was ill when he died on board the USS Preble while going to the Azores in the hopes of regaining his health. Cornelia Marcy was the wife of Edmund Henry Pendleton (1845–1910), a Union Army veteran who later became a successful author.

== State politics ==
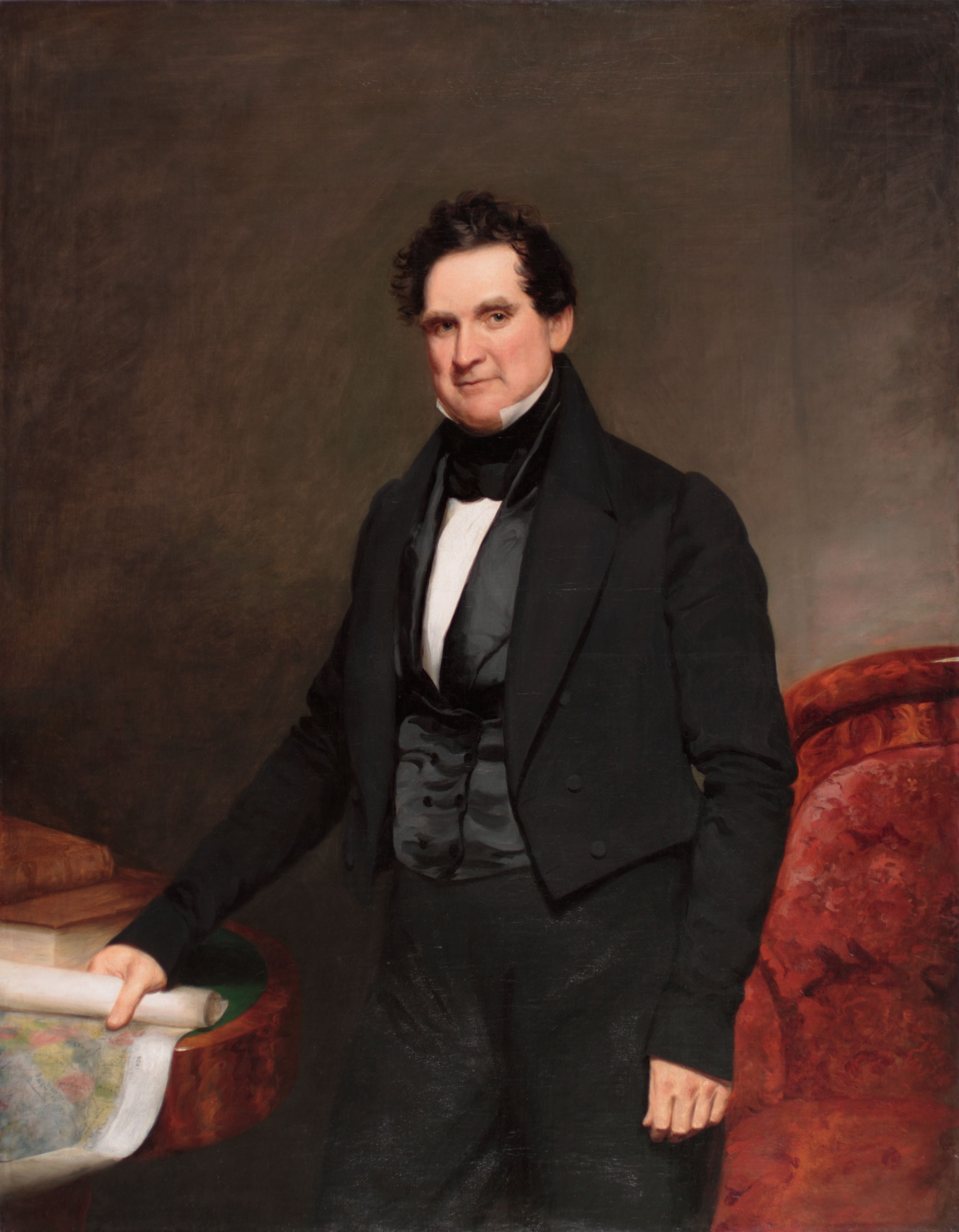
Gubernatorial portrait of William L. Marcy

Marcy became the leading member of the Albany Regency, a group of Democratic politicians who controlled State politics between 1821 and 1838. He was Adjutant General of New York with the rank of brigadier general from 1821 to 1823, New York State Comptroller from 1823 to 1829, and an associate justice of the New York Supreme Court from 1829 to 1831.

In 1831, he was elected U.S. Senator from New York by the state legislature as a Jacksonian Democrat, and served from March 4, 1831, to January 1, 1833. He resigned upon taking office as governor, to which position he was elected in 1832. He sat on the Senate Judiciary Committee in the 22nd Congress. Defending Jackson's nomination of Martin Van Buren as minister to the United Kingdom in 1832, Marcy used the phrase "to the victor belong the spoils", from which the term spoils system is derived to refer to patronage political appointments.

Marcy was elected as Governor of New York in 1832, taking office in 1833. He was re-elected in 1834 and 1836, serving through 1838. As governor he checked the issue of bank charters by the legislature and secured the enactment, in 1838, of a general banking law, which abolished the monopoly features that resulted from the old banking system. In 1838, he was defeated by Whig William H. Seward, which led to a radical change in state politics and then ended the Regency. To the abolitionists who questioned the candidates for governor, Marcy was considered a "doughface", a man with Southern sympathies. He was well aware of the importance of Southern cotton and trade for New York state, both to New York City as a major part of exports from that port and to the upstate textile mills that processed cotton from the Deep South.

Marcy was appointed as a member of the Mexican Claims Commission, serving from 1839 to 1842. Later he was recognized as one of the leaders of the Hunkers, the conservative, office-seeking, and pro-compromise-on-slavery faction of the Democratic Party in New York. He later served in the two pro-slavery administrations of James K. Polk and Franklin Pierce.

== Federal politics ==
Marcy served as United States Secretary of War in the Cabinet of President James K. Polk from 1845 until 1849, when he resumed the practice of law in New York. After 1849, Marcy led the "Soft" faction of the Hunkers that supported reconciliation with the Barnburners. He sought the Democratic presidential nomination in 1852 but was unsuccessful, in part due to "Hard" opposition led by Daniel S. Dickinson.

== Secretary of State ==
Marcy returned to public life in 1853 to serve as United States Secretary of State under President Franklin Pierce. On June 1 of that year, he issued a circular to American diplomatic agents abroad, recommending that whenever practicable, they should appear in the simple dress of an American citizen. This directive created much discussion in Europe, where diplomats typically wore court dress. In 1867, Marcy's recommendation was enacted into law by the US Congress.

Marcy resolved the Koszta Affair (1853), related to detention of an unnaturalized American resident by Austria, gaining his freedom. He negotiated the Gadsden Purchase from Mexico in the Southwest, the last major land acquisition in the contiguous United States. It added land to what are now the states of New Mexico and Arizona. With a southern route of territory all under United States control, southerners worked to promote a railroad from Texas to San Diego but were not successful.

In 1854 Marcy had to deal with the complications growing out of the bombardment of Greytown (now San Juan de Nicaragua), by the United States warship Cyane in retaliation for insults offered the American minister by its inhabitants and for their refusal to make restitution for damages to American property. The expedition of William Walker to Nicaragua, and his assumption of its Presidency, in 1855, further complicated the Central American question.

Upon the 1854 seizure by Spain of the American vessel Black Warrior, on the ground that this vessel had violated the customs regulations of the port of Havana, some propagandists in the United States Congress as well as Pierre Soulé, the American minister in Spain, seemed to prefer war and make possible the seizure of Cuba. It was largely due to Marcy's influence that war was averted, Spain restored the confiscated cargo, paid restitution, and remitted the captain's fine. Three American diplomats met to discuss the future of Cuba, but the resulting Ostend Manifesto was quite unexpected, and Marcy promptly disavowed the document.

The Crimean War led to a diplomatic controversy with Great Britain because of British recruiting in several American cities, and in May 1856, the papers of the British representative Sir John Crampton and several consuls were revoked. The following year the British government sent Sir Francis Napier to Washington to take Crampton's place. A diplomatic disagreement with Britain caused Marcy to reject the Declaration of Paris of 1856, which would have set the rules of international maritime law.

Other affairs that demanded Marcy's attention were a Canadian tariff reciprocity treaty, Commodore Matthew C. Perry's negotiations for naval and trade access with Japan, and a British fishery dispute.

== Death ==
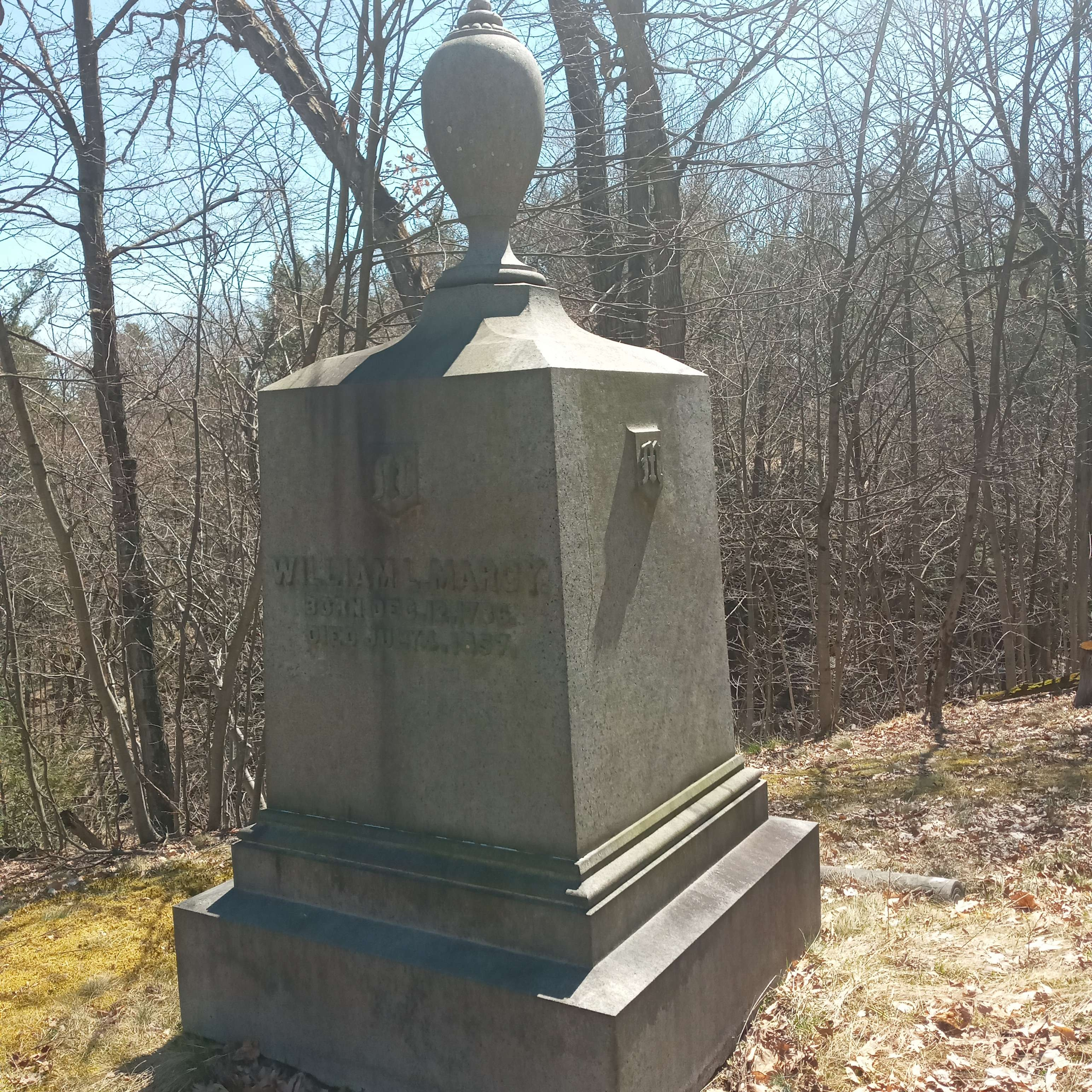
The gravesite of William L. Marcy

Marcy died at Ballston Spa, New York, on July 4, 1857. He was buried at the Rural Cemetery in Albany, New York.

== Legacy and honors ==
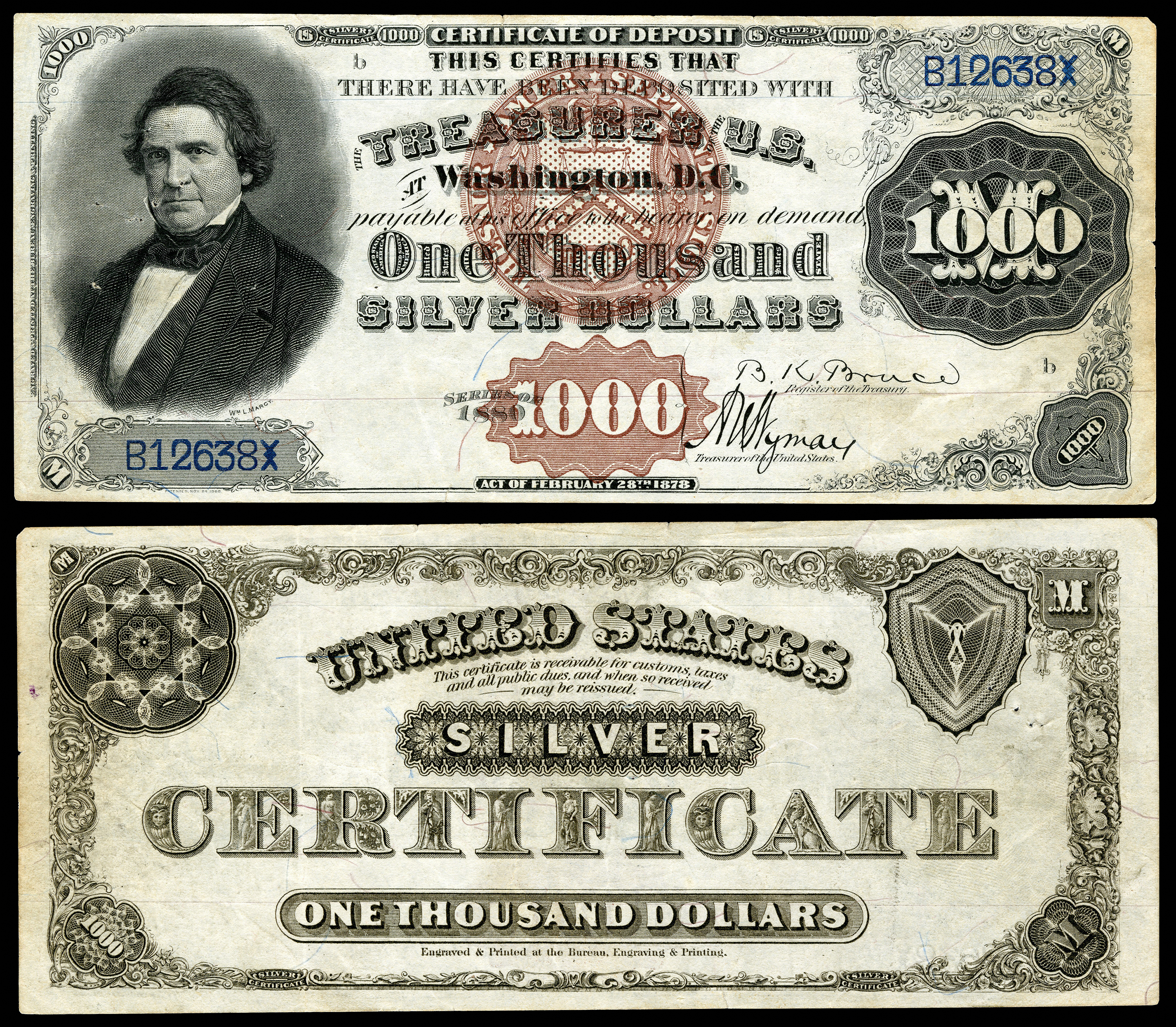
Marcy depicted on the Series 1880 $1,000 silver certificate.

- The United States Revenue Cutter William L. Marcy, launched in 1853, was named in his honor.
- His portrait appeared on American paper currency, the U.S. $1000 Silver Certificate, issued between 1878 and 1891.
- Marcy Street in his hometown Southbridge, Massachusetts, was named for him. He was also born on this street on the corner of Main Street and Marcy Street which is now the site of the St. John Paul II Parish.
- Mount Marcy in Essex County. The 5,343-foot mountain is the highest peak in New York state and the Adirondack Mountains and is named after him.
- The Town of Marcy in Oneida County was named for him.
- Fort Marcy in Santa Fe, New Mexico.
- The Marcy Projects, public housing in Brooklyn, New York, were named for him.
- Marcy School in Minneapolis, was named for him. When Minneapolis neighborhoods were later named for their schools, the Marcy-Holmes neighborhood honored Marcy School and Holmes School.

== Sources ==
- United States Congress. "William L. Marcy (id: M000127)". Biographical Directory of the United States Congress.
- This article incorporates text from a publication now in the public domain: Chisholm, Hugh, ed. (1911). "Marcy, William Learned". Encyclopædia Britannica. Vol. 17 (11th ed.). Cambridge University Press. pp. 696–697.
- "William Learned Marcy". Secretaries of War and Secretaries of the Army. United States Army Center of Military History. Archived from the original on August 26, 2009.
- "Marcy, William Learned". The Political Graveyard. Lawrence Kestenbaum.
- "Descendants of Benjamin Knower of Roxbury". Knower family in America. rootsweb.

Political offices
Preceded by John Savage	Comptroller of New York; 1823–1829	Succeeded by Silas Wright
Preceded by Enos T. Throop	Governor of New York; 1833–1838	Succeeded by William H. Seward
Preceded by William Wilkins	United States Secretary of War; 1845–1849	Succeeded by George W. Crawford
Preceded by Edward Everett	United States Secretary of State; 1853–1857	Succeeded by Lewis Cass
U.S. Senate
Preceded by Nathan Sanford	U.S. Senator (Class 3) from New York; 1831–1833; Served alongside: Charles E. Dudley	Succeeded by Silas Wright
Party political offices
Preceded by Enos T. Throop	Democratic nominee for Governor of New York; 1832, 1834, 1836, 1838	Succeeded by William C. Bouck
