= Israel Thompson =

American politician

Israel Thompson (born New Haven County, Connecticut, March 7, 1742; died Pittstown, New York, November 25, 1805) was an American soldier, politician and an early settler of Pittstown, New York.

== Family ==
Thompson was the son of Enos Thompson (died 1806) and his wife Sara Hitchcock Thompson. His younger brother Jesse Thompson (1749-1834) settled in Dutchess County, New York and was elected six times to the New York State Assembly. His much younger sister Abia or Abiah (1762-1846) married George Bliss Throop (1761-1794) and then George Whitefield Hatch and had a number of notable children - Enos T. Throop (1784-1874), a US Congressman and governor of New York, George B. Throop (1793-1854), a New York state senator and Michigan state representative, Israel Thompson Hatch (1808-1875), a US Congressman, and Eliza Hatch (1800-1885), the wife of first Congressman Gershom Powers and later Judge William B. Rochester.

Israel and Jesse Thompson were first cousins to Ezra Thompson (1738-1816), whose son Smith Thompson (1768-1843) served as United States Secretary of the Navy 1819-1823 and as a justice of the United States Supreme Court (1823-1843). Smith's family was among the Thompsons who migrated to Dutchess County; he was born in Amenia and his father was buried in the Thompson Family Graveyard in North East.

== Life ==
Thompson and his brother Jesse were in Dutchess County, New York at the start of the American Revolution, in the precinct of North East. Israel Thompson was there by 1771, as he was chosen as an assessor of quit rents and as a road commissioner in April, 1771. Israel and Jesse both served as officers in the Dutchess County militia. Promoted to major, Israel Thompson commanded several companies of militia fortifying Red Hook near Peekskill in August–September, 1776. He was later part of the Saratoga Campaign. Later in the Revolution he served as one of the Dutchess County Commissioners of Conspiracies, who were in charge of investigating and arresting Tories and in some cases sending them down-river to British-held New York City.

Arriving in the early 1780s, Thompson was one of the early settlers in Pittstown, New York, to the northeast of Troy. He served in the 5th New York State Legislature (1781-2) and the 8th New York State Legislature (1784). In 1788 he was elected as an Albany County delegate to the state convention which ratified the United States Constitution, where he voted in the negative. He was elected supervisor at the first Pittstown town meeting in 1789. When Rensselaer County was created in 1791, he was made one of the first judges. In 1797 he was elected to the 21st New York State Legislature, which met in 1798, but failed to be elected to the next session.

Thompson's wife's name was Millicent; she was the daughter of Enos Mead, who died about 1774 leaving substantial land claims in Dutchess County to her and his other children.

== Legacy ==
Israel Thompson appears on a mural of the ratification in the United States Post Office (Poughkeepsie, New York), painted as a Works Progress Administration project during the building's construction 1937-9.
