= Jesse Thompson =

American politician (1749–1834)

Jesse Thompson (November 14, 1749 – June 23, 1834) was an American politician from New York State.

== Life ==
Thompson was born on November 14, 1749, in New Haven, Connecticut.

He served as a lieutenant in the 4th Regiment, New York Line, in 1775. He served as a Dutchess County, New York Justice of the Peace from 1799 to 1801 and again from 1813 to 1814; he kept a register of the marriages at which he officiated. He was a member of the New York State Assembly (Dutchess Co.) in 1796, 1796–97, 1798, 1808–09, 1814, and 1819, representing the Federalist Party.

Thompson died on June 23, 1834, in Fleming, Cayuga County, New York.

He was the son of Enos Thompson (d. 1806) and his wife Sara Hitchcock Thompson. The soldier and politician Israel Thompson (1742-1805) was his brother. Governor Enos T. Throop (1784–1874), State Senator George B. Throop (1793–1854), and Congressman Israel T. Hatch (1808–1875) were his nephews, sons of Thompson's much younger sister Abiah (1762-1846).

== Sources ==
- The New York Civil List compiled by Franklin Benjamin Hough (pages 169 and 309; Weed, Parsons and Co., 1858)
- Lives of the Governors of the State of New York by John Stilwell Jenkins (pg. 479ff)
