= George B. Throop =

American politician (1793–1854)

Member of the Michigan House of Representatives
- In office 1847

Member of the New York State Senate from the 7th district
- In office January 1, 1828 – December 31, 1831
- Preceded by: Victory Birdseye
- Succeeded by: Jehiel H. Halsey

Personal details
- Born: George Bliss Throop; April 12, 1793 Johnstown, New York, U.S.
- Died: February 23, 1854 (aged 60) Detroit, Michigan, U.S.
- Party: Democratic
- Other political affiliations: Jacksonian
- Spouse(s): Abigail Hawley Bostwick (m. 1815; died 1825) Frances Hunt (m. 1826)
- Children: 5
- Relatives: Enos T. Throop (brother); Jesse Thompson (uncle); Israel Thompson (uncle)
- Occupation: Politician

George Bliss Throop (April 12, 1793 in Johnstown, then in Montgomery Co., now in Fulton County, New York – February 23, 1854 in Detroit, Wayne County, Michigan) was an American lawyer and politician from New York and Michigan.

== Life ==
He was the son of George Bliss Throop (1761–1794) and Abiah (Thompson) Throop (1762–1846), a sister of assemblymen Jesse Thompson and Israel Thompson.

On August 23, 1815, he married Abigail Hawley Bostwick (1792–1825). On April 10, 1826, he married Frances Hunt (1806–1872), sister of United States Supreme Court justice Ward Hunt, and they had five children.

He was Clerk of Cayuga County from 1821 to 1825, Postmaster of Auburn, and Cashier of the Cayuga County Bank.

He was a member of the New York State Senate (7th D.) from 1828 to 1831, sitting in the 51st, 52nd, 53rd and 54th New York State Legislatures.

About 1836, he removed to Detroit to pursue his banking interests. He was a Democratic member of the Michigan House of Representatives in 1847.

His older brother was Gov. Enos T. Throop (1784–1874). After their father's death, their mother married George W. Hatch, and among their children were Congressman Israel T. Hatch (1808–1875) and Eliza Hatch (1800–1885) who married first Congressman Gershom Powers (1789–1831) and then Judge William B. Rochester (1789–1838).

== Sources ==
- The New York Civil List compiled by Franklin Benjamin Hough (pages 127ff, 146 and 386; Weed, Parsons and Co., 1858)
- Lives of the Governors of the State of New York by John Stilwell Jenkins ("Enos T. Throop"; Auburn, 1851; pg. 478ff)
- Throop genealogy

New York State Senate
Preceded by Victory Birdseye	New York State Senate; Seventh District (Class 1); 1828–1831	Succeeded by Jehiel H. Halsey
