= 1838 New York gubernatorial election =

- November 5–7, 1838
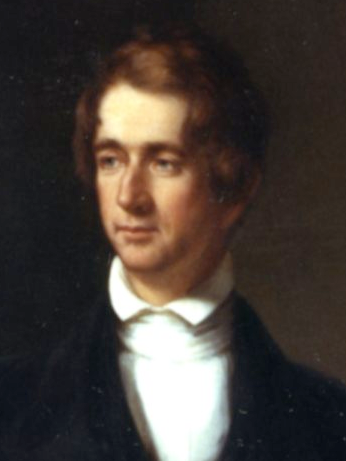

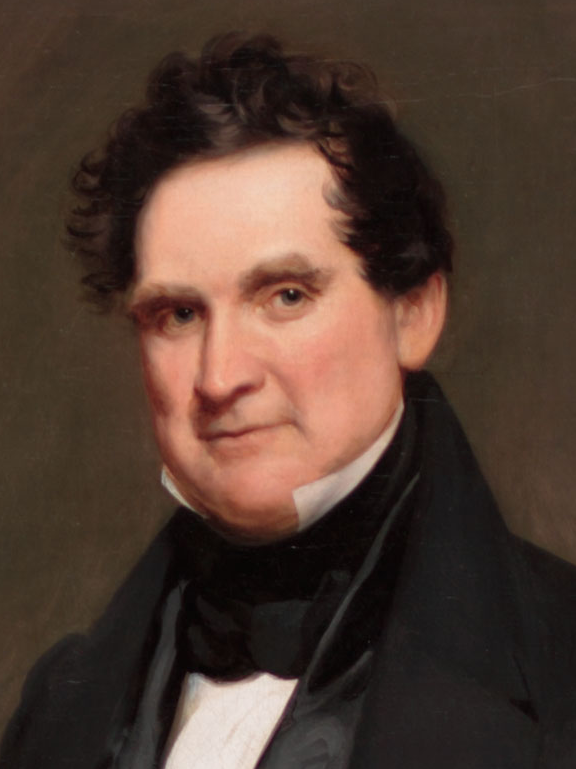
Nominee	William H. Seward	William L. Marcy
Party	Whig	Democratic
Popular vote	192,882	182,461
Percentage	51.39%	48.61%
- Results by county Marcy: 50–60% 60–70% Seward: 50–60% 60–70% No Data/Vote
Governor before election
William L. Marcy
Democratic
Elected Governor
William H. Seward
Whig

The 1838 New York gubernatorial election was held from November 5 to 7, 1838, to elect the Governor of New York.

After winning election, Seward demonstrated considerable support for African Americans, signing legislation during his two terms to guarantee jury trials to alleged fugitive slaves, to repeal the nine-month allowance for slaveholders bringing slaves into the state, to give state support to efforts to gain freedom for free blacks kidnapped and sold into slavery, and establish public education for all children.

== General election ==
=== Candidates ===
- William L. Marcy, incumbent Governor (Democratic)
- William H. Seward, former State Senator from Auburn and nominee for governor in 1834 (Whig)

=== Campaign ===
The issues of slavery and abolition were among the topics of the campaigns. Abolitionists asked the candidates for both positions their stands on the following issues: 1) "the right of blacks to a jury trial when seized as fugitive slaves; 2) a law freeing slaves-in-transit the moment they were brought into the state by their masters; and 3) equal suffrage for blacks."

Incumbent Democrat William Marcy and his running mate were described as doughfaces, not supporting the abolitionist proposals. During the campaign, Seward said that he did not support the latter two proposals, noting that a change to suffrage required a constitutional amendment to be changed. Thus, while abolitionists endorsed Luther Bradish, the Whig candidate for lieutenant governor, who supported all three, some activists recommended voting against Seward.

=== Results ===
The Whig ticket, led by Seward, was elected.

1838 New York gubernatorial election
Party	Candidate	Votes	%	±%
Whig	William H. Seward	192,882	51.39%	+6.77%
Democratic	William L. Marcy (incumbent)	182,461	48.61%	−5.63%
Total votes		375,343	100%	

== Sources ==
- Result: The Tribune Almanac 1841
