= Oliver C. Comstock =

American politician (1780–1860)

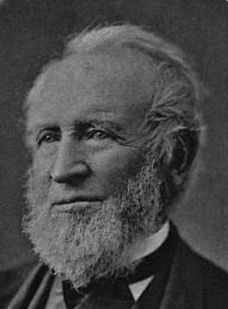

26th Chaplain of the United States House of Representatives
- In office December 20, 1836 – March 3, 1837

Member of the U.S. House of Representatives from New York's 20th district
- In office March 4, 1813 – March 3, 1819
- Preceded by: New District
- Succeeded by: Jonathan Richmond; Caleb Baker

Judge of New York Court of Common Pleas (Tompkins County)
- In office 1817–1818

Judge of New York Court of Common Pleas (Seneca County)
- In office 1812–1815

New York State Assembly
- In office 1810–1812

Personal details
- Born: Oliver Cromwell Comstock; March 1, 1780 Warwick, Rhode Island
- Died: January 11, 1860 (aged 79) Marshall, Michigan
- Party: Democratic-Republican

Oliver Cromwell Comstock (March 1, 1780 – January 11, 1860) was a United States representative from New York.

== Biography ==
He was born on March 1, 1780, in Warwick, Rhode Island, he moved with his parents to Schenectady, New York, when he was a child. He received a liberal schooling and studied medicine, practicing in Trumansburg. He was a member of the New York State Assembly from 1810 to 1812 and was the first judge of New York Court of Common Pleas for Seneca County, holding that office from 1812 to 1815.

Comstock was elected as a Democratic-Republican to the Thirteenth, Fourteenth, and Fifteenth Congresses, holding office from March 4, 1813, to March 3, 1819. He was not a candidate for renomination in 1818, and was the first judge of court of common pleas for Tompkins County in 1817 and 1818. He abandoned the practice of medicine and studied theology. He was licensed to preach and ordained to the Baptist ministry; he was then installed as pastor of the First Baptist Church in Rochester and served in that capacity from 1825 to 1834. He was elected Chaplain of the House of Representatives on December 20, 1836, and served until March 3, 1837. He moved to Michigan and resumed ministerial duties at Detroit in 1839; from 1841 to 1843 he was a regent of the University of Michigan at Ann Arbor, and from 1843 to 1845 he was State superintendent of public instruction. Comstock died in Marshall, Calhoun County, Michigan, in 1860; interment was in Oakridge Cemetery.

U.S. House of Representatives
New district	Member of the U.S. House of Representatives from New York's 20th congressional district 1813–1819 with Daniel Avery 1813–15 and 1816–17, Enos T. Throop 1815–16, and Daniel Cruger 1817–19	Succeeded by Jonathan Richmond, Caleb Baker
Religious titles
Preceded by Thomas H. Stockton	26th US House Chaplain; December 20, 1836 – March 3, 1837	Succeeded by Septimus Tustin
