= Caleb Baker =

American politician

Member of the U.S. House of Representatives from New York's 20th district
- In office March 4, 1819 – March 3, 1821 with Jonathan Richmond
- Preceded by: Daniel Cruger, Oliver C. Comstock
- Succeeded by: David Woodcock, William B. Rochester

Member of the New York State Assembly from the Tioga district
- In office January 1, 1814 – December 31, 1815
- Preceded by: Jabez Beers
- Succeeded by: Gamaliel H. Barstow
- In office January 1, 1829 – December 31, 1829
- Preceded by: William Maxwell
- Succeeded by: John G. McDowell

Personal details
- Born: 1762 Providence, Rhode Island Colony, British America
- Died: June 26, 1849 (aged 86–87) Southport, New York, U.S. (now a part of Elmira)
- Party: Democratic-Republican
- Spouse: Sarah Stull Baker
- Children: 2
- Profession: lawyer; judge; politician

Caleb Baker (1762 – June 26, 1849) was an American politician and a U.S. representative from New York.

== Biography ==
Born in Providence in the Rhode Island Colony, Baker moved to New York in 1790; studied law, was admitted to the bar and began practicing. He married Sarah Stull and they had two children. He resided in the towns of Chemung, Ashland, and Newtown (now Elmira), Tioga County from 1790 to 1836. These towns are now in Chemung County, due to the partitioning of Tioga County. He moved to and lived in Southport, Chemung County, from 1836 until his death.

== Career ==
Baker served as assessor of the town of Chemung in 1791. He taught school in Wellsburg, Chemung County, in 1803 and 1804. He was appointed surrogate of Tioga County on April 7, 1806, April 13, 1825, and again in 1829. He was appointed judge of the Court of Common Pleas in 1810, and served as member of the New York State Assembly in 1814, 1815, and again in 1829. He was a Justice of the Peace of the town of Chemung in 1816.

Elected as a Democratic-Republican to the Sixteenth Congress, Baker served as the U. S. representative for the twentieth district of New York from March 4, 1819 to March 3, 1821.

== Death ==
Baker died in Southport, New York (now a part of Elmira) on June 26, 1849 (age about 86 years). He is interred at Fitzsimmons Cemetery, Elmira, New York.

New York State Assembly
Preceded by Jabez Beers	New York State Assembly; Tioga County; 1814-1815	Succeeded by Gamaliel H. Barstow
Preceded by William Maxwell	New York State Assembly; Tioga County; 1829	Succeeded by John G. McDowell
U.S. House of Representatives
Preceded by Daniel Cruger, Oliver C. Comstock	Member of the U.S. House of Representatives from New York's 20th congressional district March 4, 1819 – March 3, 1821 with Jonathan Richmond	Succeeded by David Woodcock, William B. Rochester
