= Governor Yates =

Governor Yates may refer to:

- Joseph C. Yates (1768–1837), 7th Governor of New York
- Richard Yates (politician) (1815–1873), 13th Governor of Illinois
- Richard Yates Jr. (1860–1936), 22nd Governor of Illinois, son of Richard Yates.
