= 1828 New York gubernatorial election =

- November 3–5, 1828
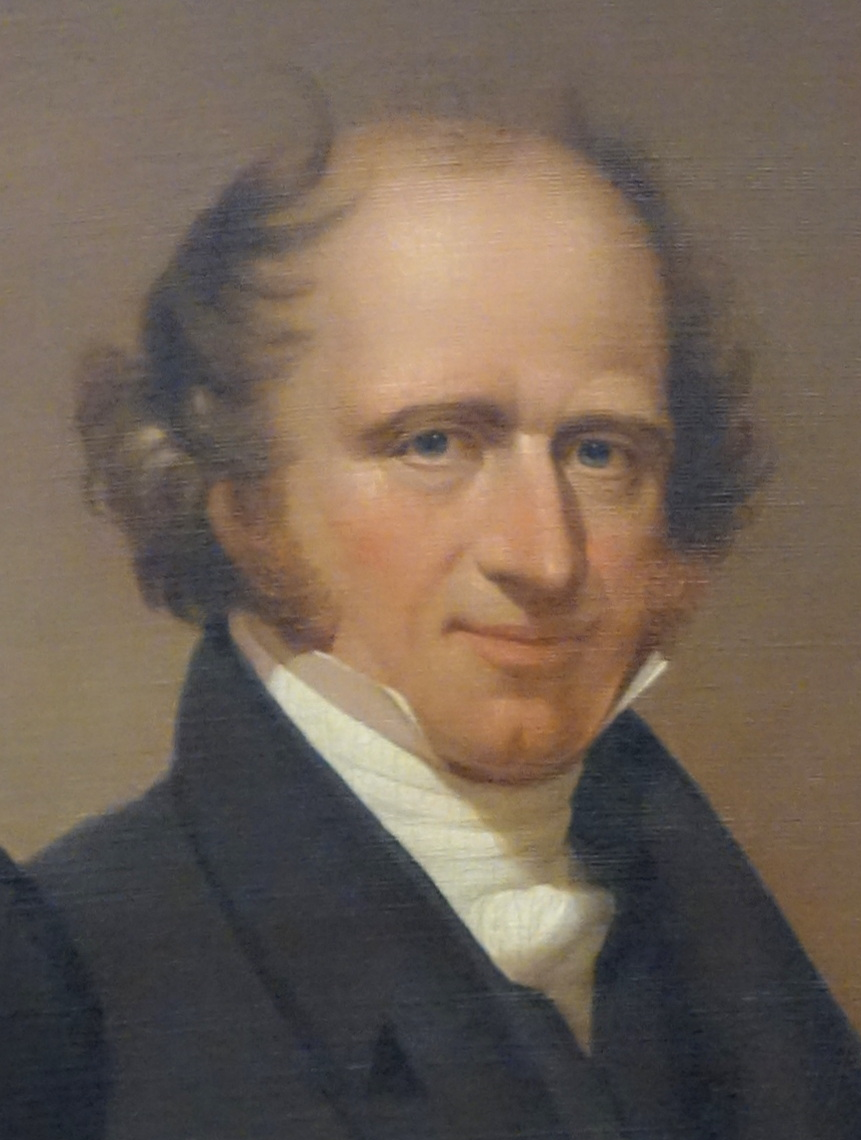

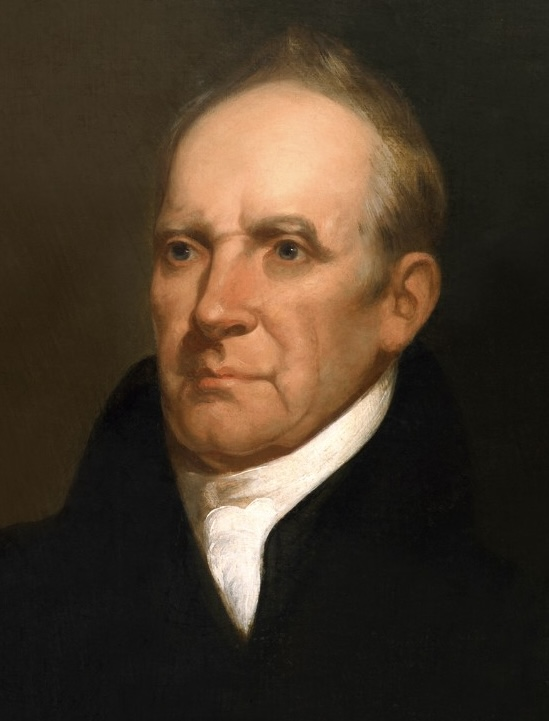

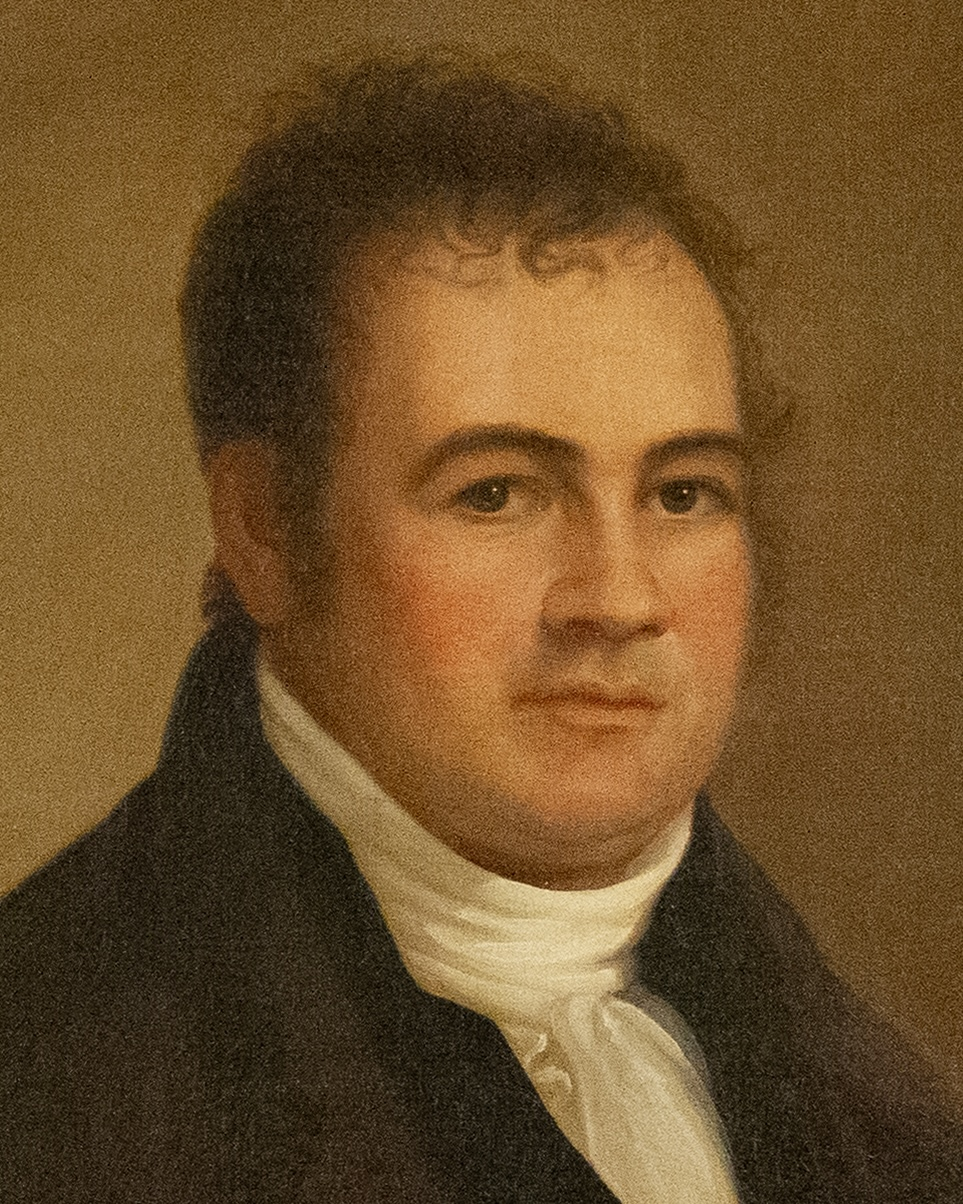
Nominee	Martin Van Buren	Smith Thompson	Solomon Southwick
Party	Democratic	National Republican	Anti-Masonic
Popular vote	136,794	106,444	33,345
Percentage	49.46%	38.48%	12.06%
- County results Van Buren: 40–50% 50–60% 60–70% 70–80% Thompson: 30–40% 40–50% 50–60% Southwick: 30–40% 40–50% 50–60%
Governor before election
Nathaniel Pitcher
Democratic-Republican
Elected Governor
Martin Van Buren
Democratic

The 1828 New York gubernatorial election was held from November 3 to 5, 1828. Incumbent Governor DeWitt Clinton died in office on February 11, 1828. Lieutenant Governor Nathaniel Pitcher succeeded him but was not a candidate for election to the next term.

United States Senator Martin Van Buren was elected Governor over United States Supreme Court Justice Smith Thompson and journalist Solomon Southwick. This is the first election to feature a winning candidate who eventually became President of the United States. This is the first election to also feature a winning candidate who eventually became both Vice President of the United States and President of the United States.

== General election ==
=== Candidates ===
- Solomon Southwick, newspaper publisher and former sheriff of Albany County (Anti-Masonic)
- Smith Thompson, Associate Justice of the United States Supreme Court (National Republican)
- Martin Van Buren, United States Senator from New York (Democratic)

The Democratic Party nominated U.S. senator Martin Van Buren. They nominated former U.S. representative and Judge of the Seventh Circuit Enos T. Throop for Lieutenant Governor.

The National Republican Party nominated Supreme Court Justice Smith Thompson. They nominated state assemblyman Francis Granger for Lieutenant Governor.

The Anti-Masonic Party nominated newspaper publisher Solomon Southwick. They nominated state senator John Crary for Lieutenant Governor.

=== Results ===
1828 New York gubernatorial election
Party	Candidate	Votes	%
Democratic	Martin Van Buren	136,794	49.46%
National Republican	Smith Thompson	106,444	38.48%
Anti-Masonic	Solomon Southwick	33,345	12.06%
Total votes		276,583	100%

== Aftermath ==
Van Buren was sworn into office as governor on January 1, 1829, but quickly resigned from office on March 12, 1829, to serve as United States Secretary of State and was succeeded by Lieutenant Governor Enos T. Throop.

== Sources ==
Result: The Tribune Almanac 1841
