= 1834 New York gubernatorial election =

- November 3–5, 1834
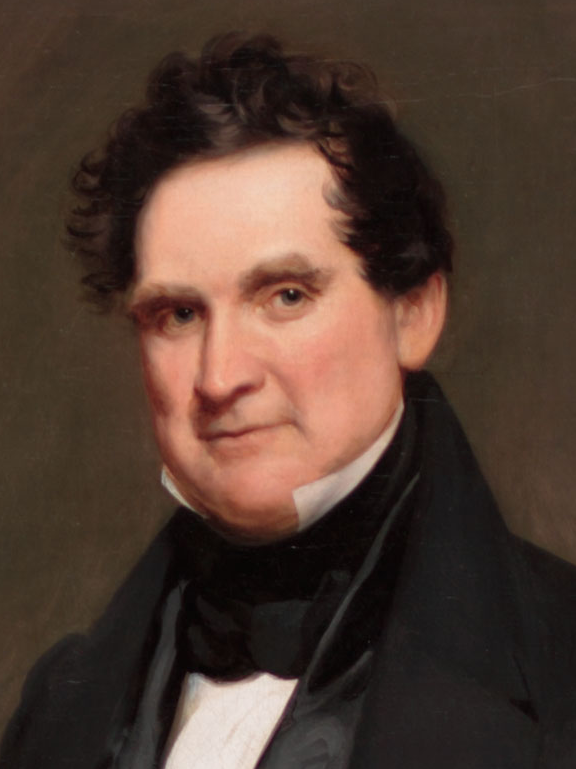

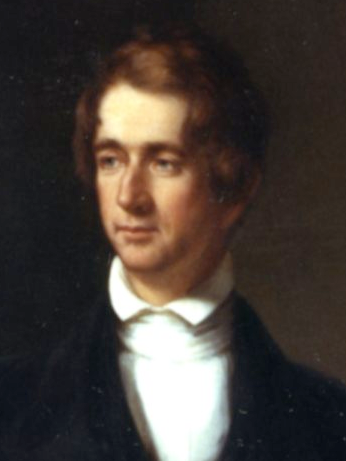
Nominee	William L. Marcy	William H. Seward
Party	Democratic	Whig
Popular vote	181,900	169,008
Percentage	51.84%	48.16%
- Results by county Marcy: 50–60% 60–70% 70–80% 80–90% Seward: 50–60% 60–70%
Governor before election
William L. Marcy
Democratic
Elected Governor
William L. Marcy
Democratic

The 1834 New York gubernatorial election was held from November 3 to 5, 1834 to elect the Governor and Lieutenant Governor of New York. This was the first fall election in which the Whig Party participated.

== Whig nomination ==
=== Candidates ===
- Amos P. Granger, former Syracuse city trustee and president of Manlius
- William H. Seward, State Senator from Auburn
- Daniel C. Verplanck, former Dutchess County Court of Common Pleas judge and U.S. Representative (died March 29)

=== Results ===
Seward fought hard for the nomination; those considered included Amos P. Granger, Daniel C. Verplanck, and others. Eventually Seward, then 33 years old, emerged as the consensus choice.

== General election ==
=== Candidates ===
- William L. Marcy, incumbent Governor since 1833 and former U.S. Senator (Democratic)
- William H. Seward, State Senator from Auburn (Whig)

Incumbent Governor William L. Marcy was re-nominated by the Democratic Party to run against the nominee of the Whig Party, future governor William H. Seward. The Democratic Party nominated the incumbent John Tracy for Lieutenant Governor.

The Whig Party nominated state assemblyman Silas M. Stilwell for Lieutenant Governor.

=== Campaign ===
During the campaign, the Democratic press charged that Seward was too young to serve; the Whig press countered by giving examples of famous people, including DeWitt Clinton, Napoleon, and Henry Clay who had served at young ages. Both sides utilized "slogans and songs," turning the race into a "lively affair."

=== Results ===
The Democratic ticket of Marcy and Tracy was elected.

1834 New York gubernatorial election
Party	Candidate	Votes	%	±%
Democratic	William L. Marcy (incumbent)	181,900	51.84%	+0.33%
Whig	William H. Seward	169,008	48.16%	−0.33%
Total votes		350,908	100%	
