= 1832 New York gubernatorial election =

- November 5–7, 1832
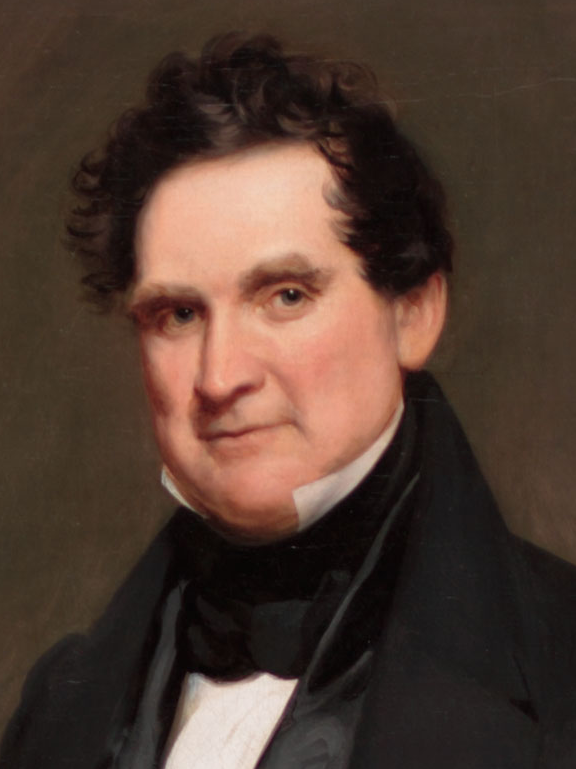

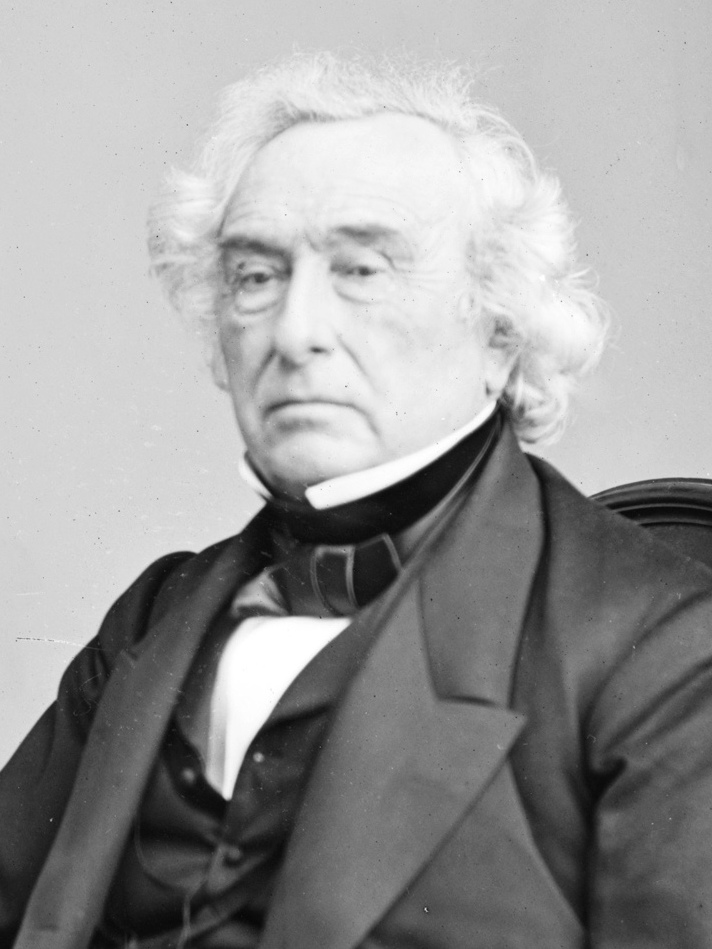
Nominee	William L. Marcy	Francis Granger
Party	Democratic	Anti-Masonic
Alliance		National Republican
Popular vote	166,410	156,672
Percentage	51.51%	48.49%
- County results Marcy: 50–60% 60–70% 70–80% Granger: 50–60% 60–70% 70–80%
Governor before election
Enos T. Throop
Democratic
Elected Governor
William L. Marcy
Democratic

The 1832 New York gubernatorial election was held from November 5 to 7, 1832, to elect the Governor and Lieutenant Governor of New York.

== General election ==
=== Candidates ===
- Francis Granger, Assemblyman from Canandaigua and candidate for Governor in 1830 (Anti-Masonic, National Republican)
- William L. Marcy, U.S. Senator since 1831 (Democratic)

The Democratic Party nominated U.S. senator William L. Marcy. They nominated University of the State of New York regent John Tracy for Lieutenant Governor.

The Anti-Masonic Party nominated state assemblyman and 1830 gubernatorial candidate Francis Granger. They nominated Samuel Stevens for Lieutenant Governor. The National Republicans supported the Granger/Stevens ticket as part of a coalition agreement ahead of the 1832 presidential election, which saw the two parties pool their votes in an unsuccessful effort to deny Andrew Jackson the electoral vote of New York.

=== Results ===
The Democratic ticket of Marcy and Tracy was elected.

1832 New York gubernatorial election
Party	Candidate	Votes	%	±%
Democratic	William L. Marcy	166,410	51.51%	+0.29%
Anti-Masonic	Francis Granger	156,672	48.49%	+0.64%
Total votes		323,082	100%	

== Sources ==
Result: The Tribune Almanac 1841
