= 1830 New York gubernatorial election =

- November 1–3, 1830
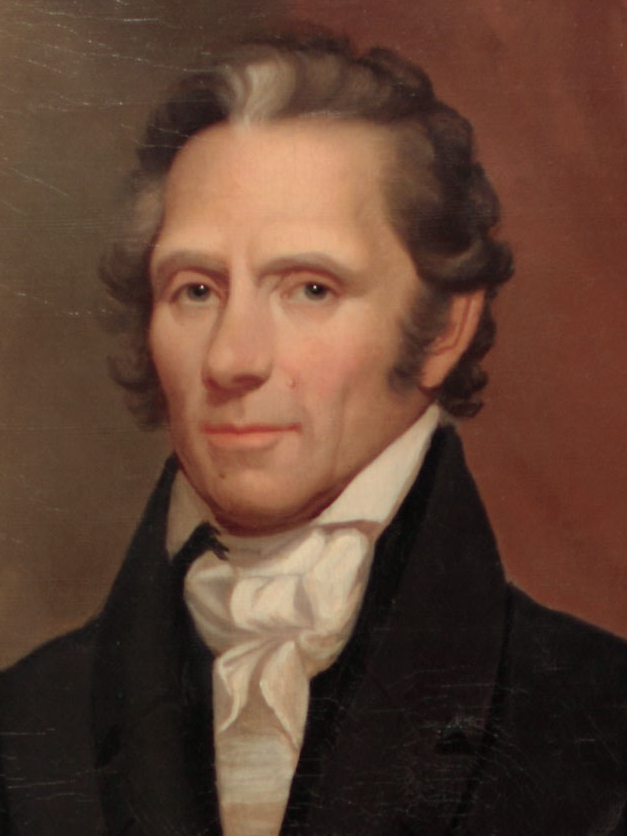

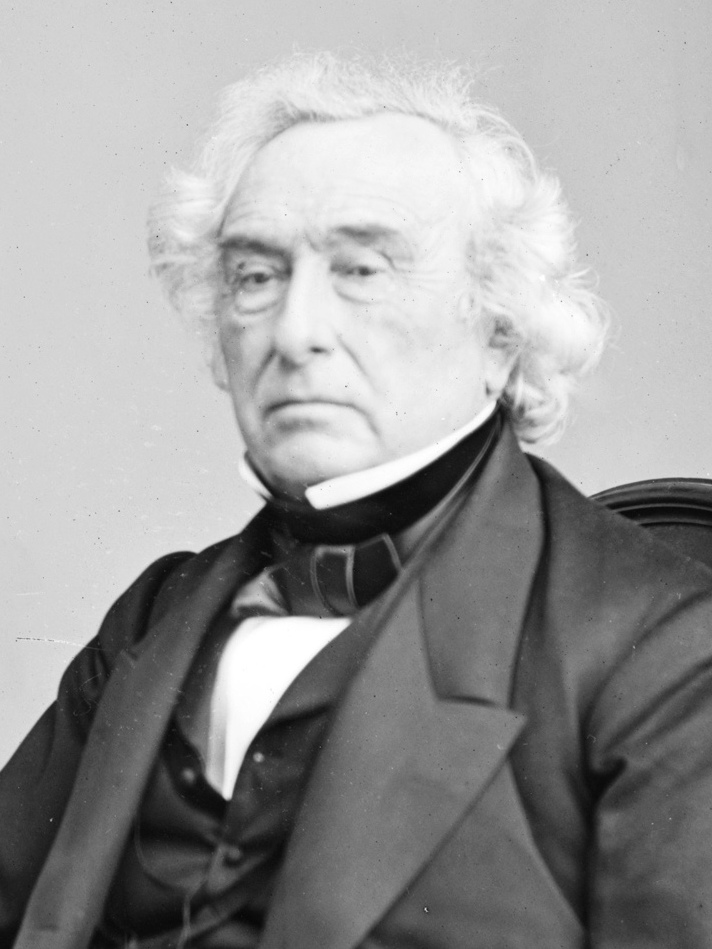
Nominee	Enos T. Throop	Francis Granger
Party	Democratic	Anti-Masonic
Alliance	—	National Republican; Working Men's (Cook faction)
Popular vote	128,842	120,361
Percentage	51.22%	47.85%
- County results Throop: 50–60% 60–70% 70–80% Granger: 50–60% 60–70% 70–80%
Governor before election
Enos T. Throop
Democratic
Elected Governor
Enos T. Throop
Democratic

The 1830 New York gubernatorial election was held from November 1 to 3, 1830, to elect the Governor and Lieutenant Governor of New York. Incumbent governor Enos T. Throop was re-elected to a second term in office over Francis Granger.

== Background ==
Martin Van Buren, who was elected Governor in 1828, was appointed United States Secretary of State by President Andrew Jackson. Van Buren was succeeded in the governorship by his Lieutenant Governor, Enos T. Throop, a member of the Albany Regency faction of the Democratic Party. In 1830, Throop ran for a full term.

== General election ==
=== Candidates ===
- Francis Granger, former state assemblyman from Canandaigua and nominee for governor in 1828 (National Republican, Anti-Masonic)
- Enos T. Throop, incumbent Governor since 1829 (Democratic)
- Ezekiel Williams (Working Men's)

The Democratic Party nominated incumbent Governor Enos T. Throop. They nominated former state senator Edward Philip Livingston for Lieutenant Governor.

The Anti-Masonic Party nominated former state assemblyman and 1828 Lieutenant Gubernatorial candidate Francis Granger. They nominated Samuel Stevens for Lieutenant Governor. The Granger/Stevens ticket was also supported by the National Republicans and by the faction of the Workingmen's Party led by Noah Cook.

The faction of the Working Men's Party led by George Henry Evans and Thomas Skidmore nominated Ezekiel Williams.

=== Results ===
The Democratic ticket of Throop and Livingston was elected.

1830 New York gubernatorial election
Party	Candidate	Votes	%	±%
Democratic	Enos T. Throop (incumbent)	128,842	51.22%	+1.76%
Anti-Masonic	Francis Granger	120,361	47.85%	+9.37%
Working Men's	Ezekiel Williams	2,332	0.93%	N/A
Total votes		251,535	100%	

== Sources ==
Result: The Tribune Almanac 1841
