= Daniel Avery (politician) =

American politician (1766–1842)

Member of the U.S. House of Representatives from New York
- In office September 30, 1816 – March 3, 1817
- Preceded by: Enos T. Throop
- Succeeded by: Daniel Cruger
- Constituency: 20th district
- In office March 4, 1811 – March 3, 1815
- Preceded by: Vincent Mathews
- Succeeded by: Enos T. Throop
- Constituency: 14th district (1811–13); 20th district (1813–15)

Personal details
- Born: September 18, 1766 Groton, Connecticut Colony, British America
- Died: January 30, 1842 (aged 75) Aurora, New York, U.S.
- Citizenship: American
- Party: Democratic Party
- Spouses: Lydia Avery Avery; Abigail Smith Avery; Freelove Mitchell Avery
- Children: 2
- Profession: Attorney

Military service
- Allegiance: United States of America
- Branch/service: Connecticut Militia
- Years of service: May 1794
- Rank: ensign; lieutenant; captain
- Unit: Sixth Company, Eighth Regiment

Daniel Avery (September 18, 1766 – January 30, 1842) was an American politician and a United States representative from New York.

== Biography ==
Born in Groton in the Connecticut Colony, Avery attended the common schools.

== Career ==
Avery was appointed ensign in the Sixth Company, Eighth Regiment of the Connecticut Militia, and served as lieutenant and captain until May 1794. After moving to Aurora, Cayuga County, New York in 1795, he subsequently became the owner of a large tract of land which was farmed by tenants.

Elected as a Democratic-Republican to represent the 14th district during the Twelfth Congress and the 20th district during the Thirteenth Congress, Avery held the office from March 4, 1811, to March 3, 1815. He was elected to represent the 20th District during the Fourteenth Congress to fill the vacancy caused by the resignation of Enos T. Throop and served from September 30, 1816, to March 3, 1817. He resumed the management of his estate and was connected with the land office at Albany for twenty years.

== Death ==
Avery died in Aurora, Cayuga County, New York, on January 30, 1842 (age 75 years, 134 days). He is interred at Oak Glen Cemetery, Aurora, New York.

U.S. House of Representatives
Preceded by Vincent Mathews	Member of the U.S. House of Representatives from New York's 14th congressional district 1811–1813	Succeeded by Jacob Markell
New district	Member of the U.S. House of Representatives from New York's 20th congressional district 1813–1815 with Oliver Comstock	Succeeded by Enos T. Throop, Oliver Comstock
Preceded by Enos T. Throop, Oliver Comstock	Member of the U.S. House of Representatives from New York's 20th congressional district 1816–1817 with Oliver Comstock	Succeeded by Daniel Cruger, Oliver Comstock
