= Israel T. Hatch =

American politician (1808–1875)

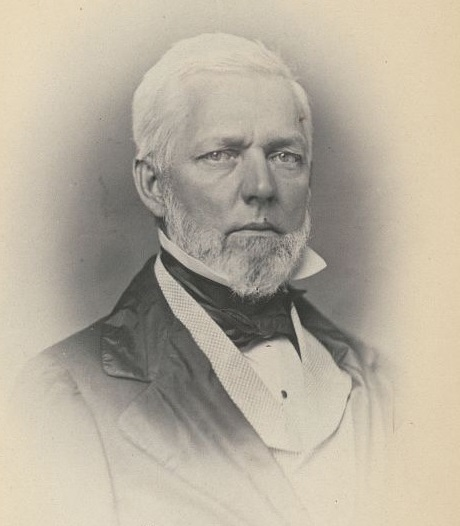

Member of the U.S. House of Representatives from New York's 32nd district
- In office March 4, 1857 – March 3, 1859
- Preceded by: Solomon G. Haven
- Succeeded by: Elbridge G. Spaulding

Personal details
- Born: June 30, 1808 Johnstown, New York, US
- Died: September 24, 1875 (aged 67) Buffalo, New York, US
- Party: Democratic

Israel Thompson Hatch (June 30, 1808 – September 24, 1875) was an American lawyer and politician who served one term as a U.S. representative from New York from 1857 to 1859.

== Biography ==
He was born in Johnstown, New York, on June 30, 1808. Hatch pursued preparatory studies. He was graduated from Union College, Schenectady, New York, in 1829. He studied law. He was admitted to the bar in 1828. He moved to Buffalo the same year and practiced law. He served as assistant secretary of state 1829–1831. Practiced law in Buffalo 1831–1840. He served as member of the State assembly 1833, 1834, and 1851. Surrogate of Erie County 1833–1836. He served as president of the Commercial Bank of Buffalo 1840–1842. Grain merchant.

=== Tenure in Congress ===
Hatch was elected as a Democrat to the Thirty-fifth Congress (March 4, 1857 – March 3, 1859). He served as chairman of the Committee on Militia (Thirty-fifth Congress). He was an unsuccessful candidate for reelection in 1858 to the Thirty-sixth Congress.

=== Later career and death ===
He was appointed by President Buchanan as postmaster of Buffalo, New York, and served from November 11, 1859, to March 27, 1861. He resumed the practice of law. He also engaged in banking and was prominently connected with elevator and dock enterprises. He served as member of the State constitutional convention 1867–1868. He served as commissioner to negotiate a reciprocity treaty between the United States and the Dominion of Canada in 1869 and 1870. Built the Marine and Empire elevators in Buffalo.

He died in Buffalo, New York, on September 24, 1875. He was interred in Forest Lawn Cemetery.

Gov. Enos T. Throop and politician and banker George B. Throop were half-brothers of his, sons of Hatch's mother from her first marriage. Through his sister Eliza he was brother-in-law to Representative Gershom Powers and Representative William B. Rochester.

U.S. House of Representatives
Preceded by Solomon G. Haven	Member of the U.S. House of Representatives from New York's 32nd congressional district 1857–1859	Succeeded by Elbridge G. Spaulding
