= Solomon Southwick =

American newspaper publisher and politician (1773–1839)

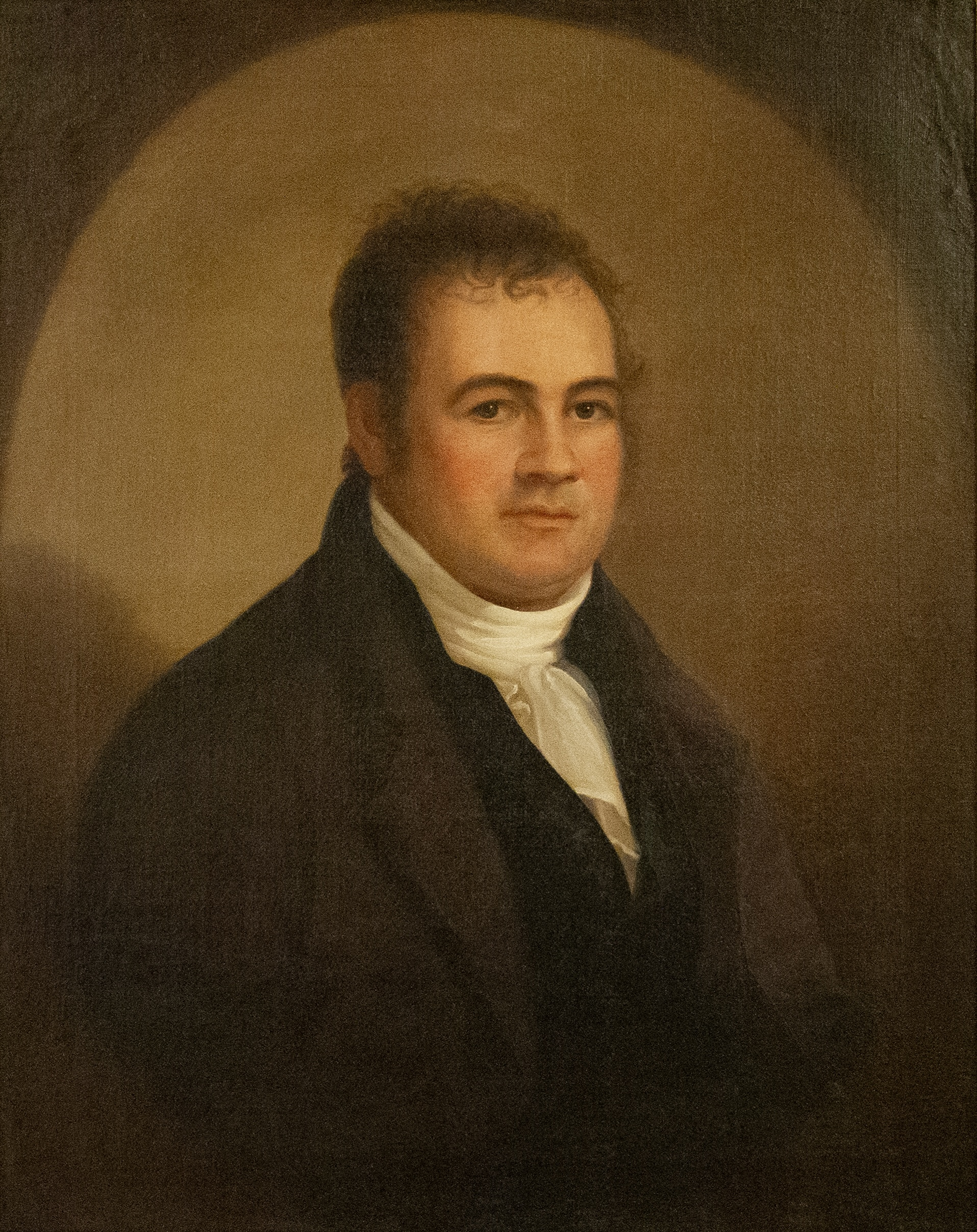
- Portrait, c. 1804

Anti-Masonic Party Nominee for Governor of New York
- In office 1828
- Preceded by: None
- Succeeded by: Francis Granger

Postmaster of Albany, New York
- In office 1821–1822
- Preceded by: Gerrit L. Dox
- Succeeded by: Solomon Van Rensselaer

Member of the Board of Regents of the University of the State of New York
- In office 1812–1823
- Preceded by: Peter Gansevoort
- Succeeded by: Peter Wendell

Sheriff of Albany County, New York
- In office 1808–1810
- Preceded by: Lawrence L. Van Kleeck
- Succeeded by: Jacob Mancius

Clerk of the New York State Senate
- In office 1807–1808
- Preceded by: Henry L. Bleecker
- Succeeded by: Sebastian Visscher

Clerk of the New York State Assembly
- In office 1803–1806
- Preceded by: James Van Ingen
- Succeeded by: Gerrit Y. Lansing

Personal details
- Born: December 25, 1773 Newport, Rhode Island, British America
- Died: November 18, 1839 (aged 65) Albany, New York, U.S.
- Resting place: Albany Rural Cemetery
- Spouse: Jane Barber (m. 1795–1839)
- Children: 9 (5 lived to adulthood)
- Occupation: Printer; Newspaper publisher and editor Bank president Government official Political organizer
- Known for: Organizer and proponent of the Anti-Masonic Party

Solomon Southwick (December 25, 1773 – November 18, 1839) was an American newspaper publisher and political figure who was a principal organizer of the Anti-Masonic Party.

Born in Newport, Rhode Island, Southwick was apprenticed as a baker and trained as a commercial sailor. In 1792, he relocated to Albany, New York to work for the Albany Register newspaper, of which he later became editor and publisher. He also became affiliated with the Democratic-Republican Party and served in a variety of elected and appointed political positions.

In the 1820s, Southwick left the Democratic-Republicans and the Albany Register, and he edited a variety of agricultural and religious newspapers. He also played a major part in founding the Anti-Masonic Party and was its 1828 candidate for Governor of New York. After the Anti-Masons were supplanted by the Whigs as the major alternative to the Democratic Party, Southwick decided to forgo further involvement in politics. He became a successful speaker and lecturer and remained active until his death in Albany.

== Early life ==
Solomon Southwick was born in Newport, Rhode Island on December 25, 1773. He was the son of Solomon Southwick (1731-1797) and Ann Gardner Carpenter Southwick (1748-1783), and the grandson of Solomon Southwick (b. 1672) and his wife Mary.

Southwick's father was the publisher of the Newport Mercury newspaper and an ardent supporter of the Patriot cause during the American Revolution. He was also a member of the first graduating class of the University of Pennsylvania, but did not complete his degree. He later received an honorary bachelor's degree from the University of Pennsylvania, as well as an honorary master's degree from Yale University.

== Start of career ==
The younger Southwick was educated in Newport and initially apprenticed as a baker. He briefly pursued training as a commercial sailor, and moved to New York City in 1791 to become apprenticed as a printer. In 1792 he relocated to Albany, New York to work for the Albany Register, a newspaper aligned with the Democratic-Republican Party, which was owned by Robert and John Barber. His older brother Henry Southwick had also settled in Albany to begin a career as a printer, which likely influenced Solomon Southwick's decision to move from New York City. Henry Southwick later worked with Solomon Southwick on the Albany Register.

Robert Barber left the Albany Register later in 1792, and Solomon Southwick became a partner in the newspaper and its associated printing business. In 1795 he married Jane Barber, the sister of Robert and John Barber.

== Later career ==
In addition to editing the Albany Register, Southwick became active in civic life and took part in politics as a Democratic-Republican. He served on Albany's volunteer fire department beginning in 1801, and was Clerk of the New York State Assembly from 1803 to 1806, and Clerk of the New York State Senate from 1807 to 1808.

From 1808 to 1810 Southwick served as Sheriff of Albany County, New York. In 1812 he was appointed to the New York State Board of Regents, and he served until 1823. Southwick studied law with Harmanus Bleecker, and was admitted to the bar in 1813. He was the official state printer, and continued to serve in local offices, including Postmaster of Albany. At the founding of the Farmers’ and Mechanics’ Bank in 1811, Southwick was elected to serve as its president.

In 1812 Southwick was tried for the charge of attempting to bribe Assembly Speaker Alexander Sheldon to procure Assembly votes in favor of a new central bank to replace the First Bank of the United States after the first bank's charter had expired. Southwick appeared in court in Johnstown to face Judge James Kent. He was prosecuted by Thomas Addis Emmet, and defended by Aaron Burr, Daniel Cady, Abraham Van Vechten and Ebenezer Foote. The trial ended with Southwick's acquittal.

== Anti-Masonic views ==
By 1817 or 1818 Southwick's political views were no longer in line with those of the Democratic-Republicans, and he ceased publication of the Albany Register. He then published several specialty newspapers, including The Plough Boy, a publication which provided information about farming in New York and advocated the creation of local, county and state agricultural societies. He also published and edited the Christian Visitant, a religious magazine, and the National Democrat, a political newspaper which opposed the Democratic-Republicans. Southwick also ran quixotic campaigns for the United States House of Representatives and Governor of New York in 1822 as the candidate of the National Democrats (also called the National Republican Party).

In addition, Southwick opened an office that organized and operated lotteries to raise money for state projects and programs. According to Thurlow Weed and other contemporaries, Southwick appeared in the mid-1820s to have become eccentric, and consulted fortune tellers and mystics in an effort to obtain winning lottery numbers for contests held in other states. Weed and others indicate that Southwick acted for several years as though every time he checked his mail, he was sure to be notified that he had won a large sum, but he never did. When Southwick sustained personal financial losses in operating New York's lotteries, the state reimbursed him.

At the founding of the Anti-Masonic Party, Southwick became one of its chief organizers and proponents. He published the National Observer, an Anti-Masonic newspaper, and he ran unsuccessfully for Governor as an Anti-Mason in 1828.

By 1831 Anti-Masonic influence in New York was on the wane, and Southwick decided to take no further part in politics. He became a popular moralizer and sermonizer on the statewide lecture circuit, and frequently delivered addresses including: The Bible; Temperance; and Self-Education, many of which were also reproduced as pamphlets. From 1837 to 1839 he was associated with the Family Newspaper, a periodical which was published by his son Alfred.

== Additional published works ==
The Pleasures of Poverty, a poem (Albany, 1823); A Solemn Warning Against Free-Masonry (1827); and Five Lessons for Young Men (1837).

== Death and burial ==
Southwick died suddenly in Albany on November 18, 1839. He was originally buried at the Episcopal Church Cemetery on State Street in Albany, and later reinterred at Albany Rural Cemetery, Lot 72, Section 14.

== Family ==
In 1795 Southwick married Jane Barber, the sister of Robert and John Barber, with whom he had worked at the Albany Register. She was born in Albany between 1773 and 1775, and died in Albany on January 31, 1861. Solomon and Jane Southwick had nine children, of whom five lived to adulthood.

== See also ==
- List of early American publishers and printers

Party political offices
New political party	Anti-Masonic nominee for Governor of New York; 1828	Succeeded by Francis Granger
