= Nathaniel Garrow =

American politician (1780–1841)

Member of the U.S. House of Representatives from New York's 24th district
- In office March 4, 1827 – March 3, 1829
- Preceded by: Charles Kellogg
- Succeeded by: Gershom Powers

Personal details
- Born: April 25, 1780 Barnstable, Massachusetts, U.S.
- Died: March 3, 1841 (aged 60) Auburn, New York, U.S.
- Resting place: Fort Hill Cemetery, Auburn, New York, U.S.
- Party: Jacksonian
- Profession: Politician

Nathaniel Garrow (April 25, 1780 – March 3, 1841) was an American politician who served one term as a U.S. representative from New York from 1827 to 1829.

== Biography ==
Born in Barnstable, Massachusetts, Garrow attended the public schools. After this he went to see working as a sailor. He moved to Auburn, New York, in 1796.

He was appointed Justice of the Peace in 1809. He served as Sheriff of Cayuga County from 1815 to 1819 and again from 1821 to 1825.

=== Congress ===
Garrow was elected as a Jacksonian to the Twentieth Congress (March 4, 1827 – March 3, 1829). United States marshal of the northern district of New York from February 1837 to March 1841.

=== Death ===
He died in Auburn, New York, March 3, 1841. He was interred in the family burying ground on his estate. He was reinterred in Fort Hill Cemetery, Auburn, New York.

U.S. House of Representatives
Preceded by Charles Kellogg	Member of the U.S. House of Representatives from New York's 24th congressional district March 4, 1827 – March 3, 1829	Succeeded by Gershom Powers
