= Israel Chapin =

American general

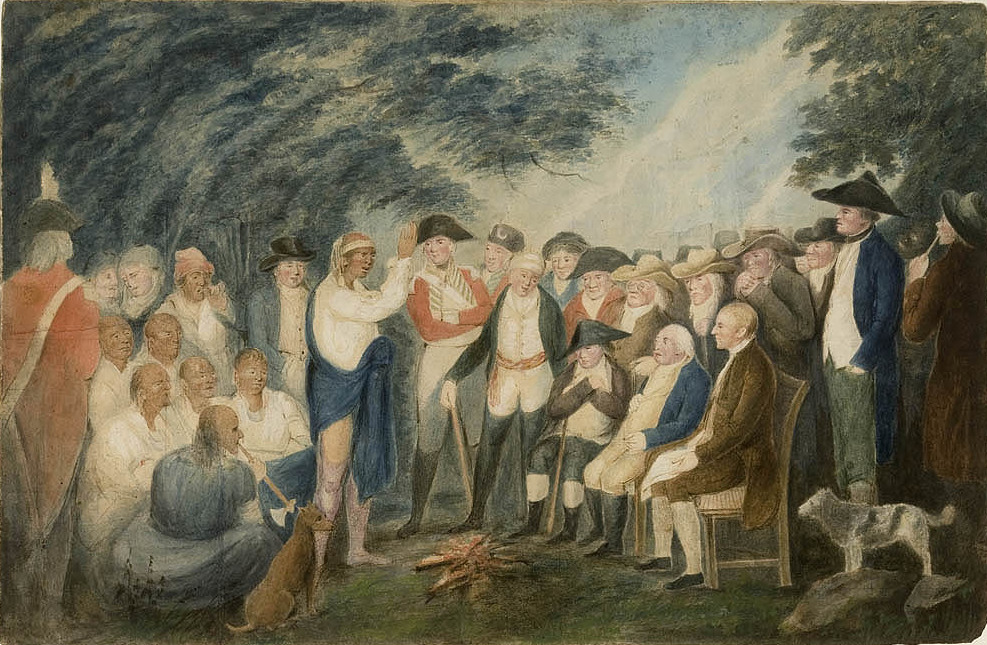
Israel Chapin (standing on right in a pointed hat) at a 1793 council during the Northwest Indian War

Israel Chapin (4 Dec 1740, Hatfield, Massachusetts – 7 Mar 1795, Canandaigua, New York) was a general in the American Revolution and later Deputy Agent to the Five Nations of Indians.

== Revolutionary War ==
Chapin served as captain of the Hatfield Militia at Boston and Lexington. He fought at the Battles of Saratoga as a major, as colonel of the Second Regiment of Hampshire County Militia, and as a brigadier general following the Invasion of Quebec.

== Post-war ==
Chapin was involved in negotiating the Phelps and Gorham Purchase in Western New York in 1788. The following year he settled in Canandaigua. In 1792 Secretary of War Henry Knox appointed Chapin "General Agent for Indian Affairs of the United States." In this capacity he oversaw the negotiations for the Treaty of Canandaigua, which was signed in November 1794. He died shortly after and is buried in Pioneer Cemetery in Canandaigua. Among others the Seneca chief Red Jacket spoke at his funeral, saying "Brothers, we have lost a good friend. The Six Nations weep with the United States."

== Personal ==
Israel Chapin married Elizabeth Marsh around 1763. The couple had seven children, among them Captain Israel Chapin Jr. (1763–1833), who succeeded his father as Superintendent of Indian Affairs. Chapin's granddaughter Clarissa was the wife of US Representative John Greig.
