= Jonathan Richmond =

American politician (1774–1853)

Member of the U.S. House of Representatives from New York's 20th district
- In office March 4, 1819 – March 3, 1821
- Preceded by: Daniel Cruger; Oliver C. Comstock
- Succeeded by: David Woodcock; William B. Rochester

Personal details
- Born: July 31, 1774 Dartmouth, Massachusetts, USA
- Died: July 28, 1853 (aged 78) Aurora, New York, USA
- Resting place: Aurora Cemetery, Aurora, New York
- Party: Democratic-Republican

Jonathan Richmond (July 31, 1774 – July 28, 1853) was a U.S. representative from New York.

Born in Dartmouth, Massachusetts, Richmond completed preparatory studies and moved to western New York in 1813, settling in Aurora, Cayuga County, New York. He was the Sheriff of Cayuga County, New York, from 1808 to 1812, and also worked as a United States internal revenue collector.

Richmond was elected as a Democratic-Republican to the Sixteenth Congress (March 4, 1819 – March 3, 1821).

He died in Aurora, New York, July 28, 1853, and was interred in Aurora Cemetery.

== Sources ==
- United States Congress. "Jonathan Richmond (id: R000235)". Biographical Directory of the United States Congress.

U.S. House of Representatives
Preceded by Daniel Cruger, Oliver C. Comstock	Member of the U.S. House of Representatives from New York's 20th congressional district 1819–1821 with Caleb Baker	Succeeded by David Woodcock, William B. Rochester
