= 1822 New York gubernatorial election =

- November 4–6, 1822
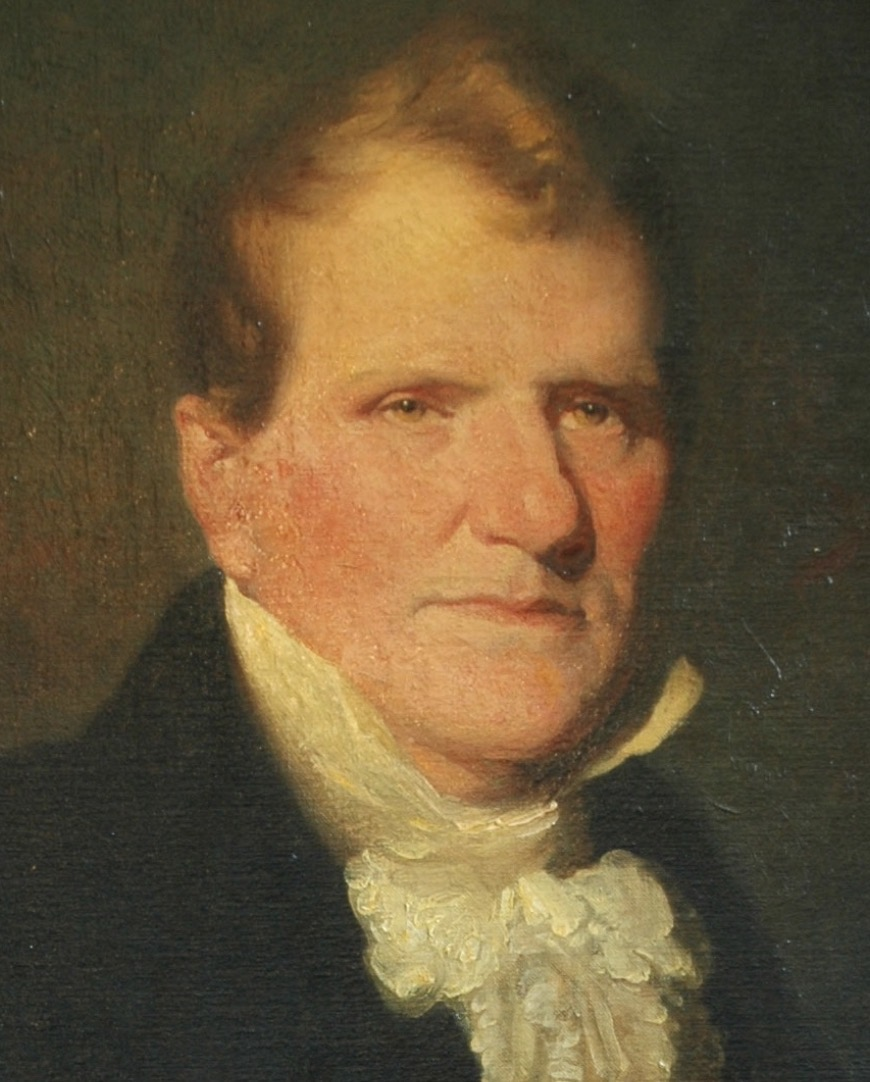
| Nominee | Joseph C. Yates |
| Party | Democratic-Republican |
| Popular vote | 128,493 |
| Percentage | 97.79% |
- County results Yates: 70–80% 80–90% >90%
Governor before election
DeWitt Clinton
Democratic-Republican
Elected Governor
Joseph C. Yates
Democratic-Republican

The 1822 New York gubernatorial election was held from November 4 to 6, 1822. Governor DeWitt Clinton was not a candidate for a third term in office after the legislature voted to shorten his term by one year. In the race to succeed him, Joseph C. Yates won with nominal opposition from Albany Register publisher Solomon Southwick.

== General election ==
=== Candidates ===
- Joseph C. Yates, justice of the New York Supreme Court (Republican)
- Solomon Southwick, publisher of the Albany Register (Independent)

The Republicans nominated State Supreme Court Justice Joseph C. Yates. Newspaper publisher Solomon Southwick ran as an independent.

=== Results ===
1822 New York gubernatorial election
| Party | Candidate | Votes | % |
|---|---|---|---|
| Democratic-Republican | Joseph C. Yates | 128,493 | 97.79% |
| Independent | Solomon Southwick | 2,910 | 2.21% |
| Total votes | | 131,503 | 100% |

== See also ==
- New York gubernatorial elections

== Sources ==
Result: The Tribune Almanac 1841
