= John Greig (politician) =

American politician

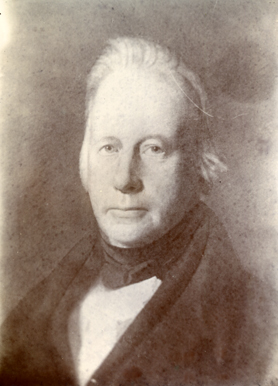

Member of the U.S. House of Representatives from New York's 26th district
- In office May 21, 1841 – September 25, 1841
- Preceded by: Francis Granger
- Succeeded by: Francis Granger

Personal details
- Born: August 6, 1779 Moffat, Dumfriesshire, Scotland
- Died: April 9, 1858 (aged 78) Canandaigua, New York, U.S.
- Resting place: West Avenue Cemetery, Canandaigua, New York, US
- Party: Whig
- Spouse: Clarissa Chapin (m. 1806)
- Occupation: Attorney

John Greig (August 6, 1779 – April 9, 1858) was an American lawyer and politician who served briefly as a United States representative from New York in 1841.

== Biography ==
Greig was born in Moffat, Dumfriesshire, Scotland in the Kingdom of Great Britain on August 6, 1779, and attended the Edinburgh High School.

He immigrated to the United States in 1797 to manage the Western New York land holdings of Sir William Pulteney. Greig subsequently studied law, was admitted to the bar and commenced practice in Canandaigua, New York. He served as president of the Ontario Bank, was president of the Ontario Agricultural Society, and was a member and vice chancellor of the Board of Regents for the University of the State of New York. He was also one of the founders of the Ontario Female Seminary. In 1806, Greig married Clarissa Chapin, the granddaughter of Israel Chapin.

=== Congress ===
Greig was elected as a Whig to the Twenty-seventh Congress, filling the vacancy caused by the resignation of Francis Granger; he served from May 21, 1841, until his resignation on September 25, 1841.

=== Death and legacy ===
He died in Canandaigua on April 9, 1858, with interment in West Avenue Cemetery.

The town of Greig in Lewis County was named for him.

U.S. House of Representatives
Preceded by Francis Granger	Member of the U.S. House of Representatives from New York's 26th congressional district 1841	Succeeded by Francis Granger
