= Daniel Cruger =

American politician (1780–1843)

New York State Assembly
- In office 1826

District attorney (Steuben County)
- In office 1818–1821

Member of the U.S. House of Representatives from New York's 20th district
- In office March 4, 1817 – March 3, 1819
- Preceded by: Daniel Avery; Oliver C. Comstock
- Succeeded by: Caleb Baker; Jonathan Richmond

District attorney (7th Dist.)
- In office 1815–1818

Speaker of the New York State Assembly
- In office 1816

New York State Assembly
- In office 1814–1816

Personal details
- Born: December 22, 1780 Sunbury, Pennsylvania
- Died: July 12, 1843 (aged 62) Wheeling, Virginia, now West Virginia
- Party: Democratic-Republican
- Spouse(s): Hannah Clement; Lydia Boggs Shepherd
- Education: Georgetown University

Military service
- Allegiance: United States
- Branch/service: United States Army
- Rank: Major
- Battles/wars: War of 1812

Daniel Cruger (December 22, 1780 – July 12, 1843) was an American newspaper publisher, lawyer and politician who served as a United States representative from New York.

== Early and family life ==
Daniel Cruger was born in Sunbury, Northumberland County, Pennsylvania, on December 22, 1780. He was the son of Daniel Cruger, Sr. and Elizabeth (née Wheaton) Cruger. He graduated from Georgetown University in 1802. He married twice. His first wife, Hannah (née Clement) Cruger, died in 1831. His second wife, Lydia Boggs Shepherd, was the wealthy widow of Moses Sheperd, a relation of the prominent Virginia Duke Family, who was a man contractor of the National Road. They married on July 16, 1833, in Ohio County, Virginia (now West Virginia).

== Early career and military service ==
Cruger learned the printer's trade, and published the Owego Democrat in Owego, New York. He studied law, was admitted to the bar in 1805, and commenced practice in Bath, New York. Cruger served as a major in the War of 1812.

== Political career ==
He was a member from Allegany and Steuben Counties of the New York State Assembly from 1814 to 1816, and again from Steuben County in 1826. Cruger served as Speaker during 1816.

Cruger was elected as a Democratic-Republican to the Fifteenth Congress, and served from March 4, 1817, to March 3, 1819.

He was District Attorney of the Seventh District of New York from 1815 to 1818, and of Steuben County, New York, from 1818 to 1821. Afterwards he resumed the practice of law.

Daniel Cruger is buried at the Stone Church Cemetery in Wheeling, West Virginia.

Political offices
| Preceded by Samuel Young | Speaker of the New York State Assembly; 1816 | Succeeded by David Woods |
U.S. House of Representatives
| Preceded by Daniel Avery, Oliver C. Comstock | Member of the U.S. House of Representatives from New York's 20th congressional district 1817–1819 with Oliver C. Comstock | Succeeded by Caleb Baker, Jonathan Richmond |
