= Francis Granger =

American politician (1792-1868)

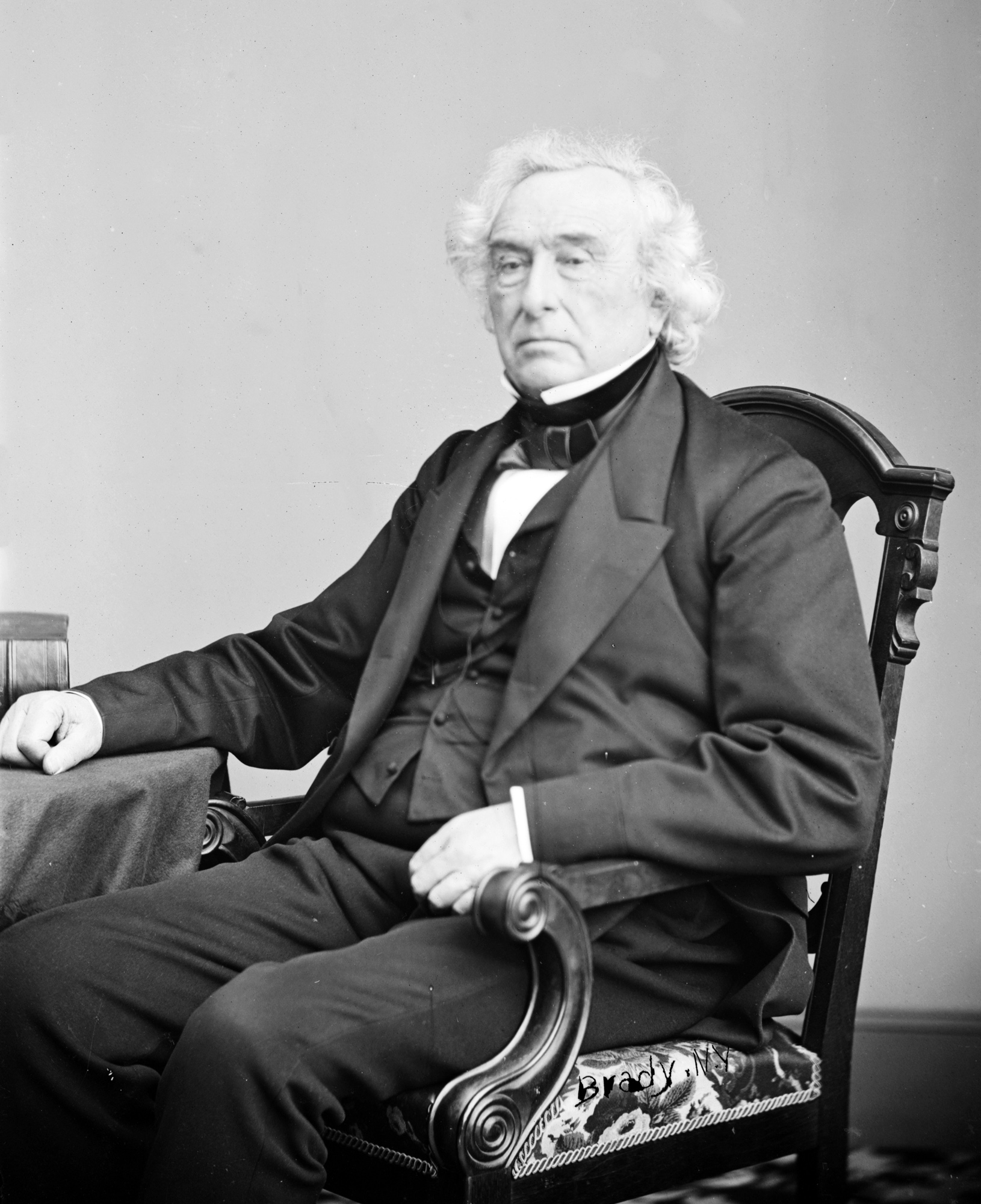
- Granger, 1855–1865

10th United States Postmaster General
- In office March 6, 1841 – September 18, 1841
- President: William Henry Harrison; John Tyler
- Preceded by: John Milton Niles
- Succeeded by: Charles A. Wickliffe

Member of the U.S. House of Representatives from New York's 26th district
- In office November 27, 1841 – March 3, 1843
- Preceded by: John Greig
- Succeeded by: Amasa Dana
- In office March 4, 1839 – March 5, 1841
- Preceded by: Mark H. Sibley
- Succeeded by: John Greig
- In office March 4, 1835 – March 3, 1837
- Preceded by: John Dickson
- Succeeded by: Mark H. Sibley

Personal details
- Born: December 1, 1792 Suffield, Connecticut, U.S.
- Died: August 31, 1868 (aged 75) Canandaigua, New York, U.S.
- Party: Democratic-Republican (before 1828); National Republican (1828–1834); Whig (1834–1860); Constitutional Union (1860-1861)
- Spouse: Cornelia Rutsen Van Rensselaer
- Children: 2
- Relatives: Gideon Granger (Father); Amos Granger (Cousin); Gordon Granger (Cousin) Robert Charles Winthrop (son-in-law)
- Education: Yale University (BA)

Francis Granger (December 1, 1792 – August 31, 1868) was an American politician who represented Ontario County, New York, in the United States House of Representatives for three non-consecutive terms. He was a leading figure in the state and national Whig Party, particularly in its moderate-conservative faction. He served as a Whig vice presidential nominee on the party's multi-candidate 1836 ticket and, in that role, became the only person to ever lose a contingent election for the vice presidency in the U.S. Senate. He also served briefly in 1841 as United States Postmaster General in the cabinet of William Henry Harrison. In 1856, he became the final Whig Party chairman before the party's collapse, after which he joined the Constitutional Union Party.

== Early life ==
Granger was born in Suffield, Connecticut, on December 1, 1792. Granger was born into a prominent political family, with his father, Gideon Granger, serving in the Connecticut House of Representatives before being appointed by Thomas Jefferson as the longest serving Postmaster General in United States history. His mother was Mindwell (née Pease) Granger (1770–1860) and his first cousin, Amos Phelps Granger, also served two terms in the United States House of Representatives.

Granger pursued classical studies at and graduated from Yale College in 1811. He then moved with his father to Canandaigua, New York, in 1814, where he studied law, was admitted to the bar in 1816 and commenced practice.

== Career ==
Granger started his own political career as a member of the New York State Assembly from 1826 to 1828 and from 1830 to 1832. He ran unsuccessful campaigns for Lieutenant Governor of New York in 1828, and for Governor of New York in both 1830 and 1832 with the National Republican Party.

=== National politics ===
He was then elected as an Anti-Jacksonian to the 24th Congress serving from March 4, 1835, to March 3, 1837.

In 1836, the Whig Party was unable to settle on one set of candidates for its presidential ticket. Granger was a regional vice presidential nominee for the northern and border states on the same ticket as William Henry Harrison, though in Massachusetts he was on the Whig ticket headed by Daniel Webster. Though Democrat Martin Van Buren secured enough votes in the Electoral College to win the presidency, Virginia's 23 electors refused to vote for his running mate Richard M. Johnson, who had then lacked only one vote. As a result, votes were split among Johnson, Granger, John Tyler and William Smith with none getting the majority. This triggered a contingent election, the only contingent vice presidential election by the Senate in history, under the Twelfth Amendment with the U.S. Senate deciding between the top two vote-getters Johnson and Granger. As the 25th Congress consisted of 35 Democrats and 17 Whigs, Granger could not hope to be elected and was defeated by Johnson 33–16.

In the general election of the same year, Granger was also running as a Whig candidate for election to the 25th Congress, but failed in that bid as well. He was re-elected to Congress as a Whig to the 26th and 27th Congresses serving from March 4, 1839, to March 5, 1841.

Harrison would win the presidency four years later in 1840 but Granger was not again his running mate and was instead replaced by John Tyler.

If Granger had been reselected as Harrison's running mate in 1840, Granger as vice president would have become president when President Harrison died in April 1841 after a month in office.

In 1841, Granger was appointed Postmaster General in the Cabinet of President William Henry Harrison and served from March 6 to September 18, 1841, the day when almost all Whig Cabinet members left the government of new President John Tyler on the instruction of their party leader Henry Clay. Following that event, he was again elected to the Congress in a special election to fill the vacancy caused by the resignation of Representative John Greig. He served from November 27, 1841, to March 3, 1843, and was not a candidate for reelection in 1842.

=== Later career ===
A supporter of the Compromise of 1850, Granger led the pro-Fillmore group which became known as the Silver Gray Whigs after Granger's own silver hair. This faction would remain in conflict with the anti-Compromise Sewardites until the collapse of the Whig Party in the state in 1855.

Chairman of the Whig National Executive Committee from 1856 to 1860, Granger joined in the call for the convention of the Constitutional Union Party that was held in May 1860. He was then a member of the peace convention of 1861 held in Washington, D.C., in an effort to devise means to prevent the impending war.

== Personal life ==
He married Cornelia Rutsen Van Rensselaer (1798–1823), the daughter of Jeremiah Van Rensselaer and Sybella Adeline (née Kane) Van Rensselaer. She was also the granddaughter of Brigadier General Robert Van Rensselaer, who was a member of the New York Provincial Congress from 1775 to 1777 and later a member of the New York State Assembly in the 1st, 2nd and 4th New York State Legislatures. (Note: Robert Van Rensselaer was the son of Johannes Van Rensselaer, the proprietor and lord of the lower manor of Rensselaerwyck known as Fort Crailo. Robert was also the younger brother of both Jeremiah Van Rensselaer, the 3rd Lieutenant Governor of New York and Catherine Van Rensselaer, who married General Philip Schuyler.) The Grangers' home at Canandaigua from 1817 to 1827, now known as the Francis Granger House, was listed on the National Register of Historic Places in 1984. Together, they had a daughter, son, and an unnamed second daughter who died with her mother in childbirth in 1823.

- Adele Granger (1819–1892), who married John Eliot Thayer (1803–1857), the son of Nathaniel Thayer. After his death, she remarried in 1865 to Robert Charles Winthrop (1809–1894), a U.S. Senator and Representative who served as Speaker of the House.
- Gideon Granger II (1821–1868), who married Isaphine Pierson (1826–1905), the daughter of U.S. Representative Isaac Pierson.

Granger died in Canandaigua on August 31, 1868. He was buried at Woodlawn Cemetery.

Party political offices
| Preceded by Smith Thompson | National Republican nominee for Governor of New York; 1830, 1832 | Succeeded by William H. Seward; Whig |
| Preceded by Solomon Southwick | Anti-Masonic nominee for Governor of New York; 1830, 1832 | Succeeded by None |
| New political party | Whig nominee for Vice President of the United States; 1836; Served alongside: John Tyler¹ | Succeeded by John Tyler |
| Preceded by Amos Ellmaker | Anti-Masonic nominee for Vice President of the United States; Endorsed; 1836 | Succeeded by Daniel Webster |
U.S. House of Representatives
| Preceded by John Dickson | Member of the U.S. House of Representatives from New York's 26th congressional district 1835–1837 | Succeeded by Mark H. Sibley |
| Preceded by Mark H. Sibley | Member of the U.S. House of Representatives from New York's 26th congressional district 1839–1841 | Succeeded by John Greig |
| Preceded by John Greig | Member of the U.S. House of Representatives from New York's 26th congressional district 1841–1843 | Succeeded by Amasa Dana |
Political offices
| Preceded by John Milton Niles | United States Postmaster General; 1841 | Succeeded by Charles A. Wickliffe |
Notes and references
1. The Whig Party ran regional candidates in 1836; Tyler ran in Southern states and Granger ran in Northern states.
