= Enos T. Throop =

Governor of New York from 1829 to 1832

Enos Thompson Throop
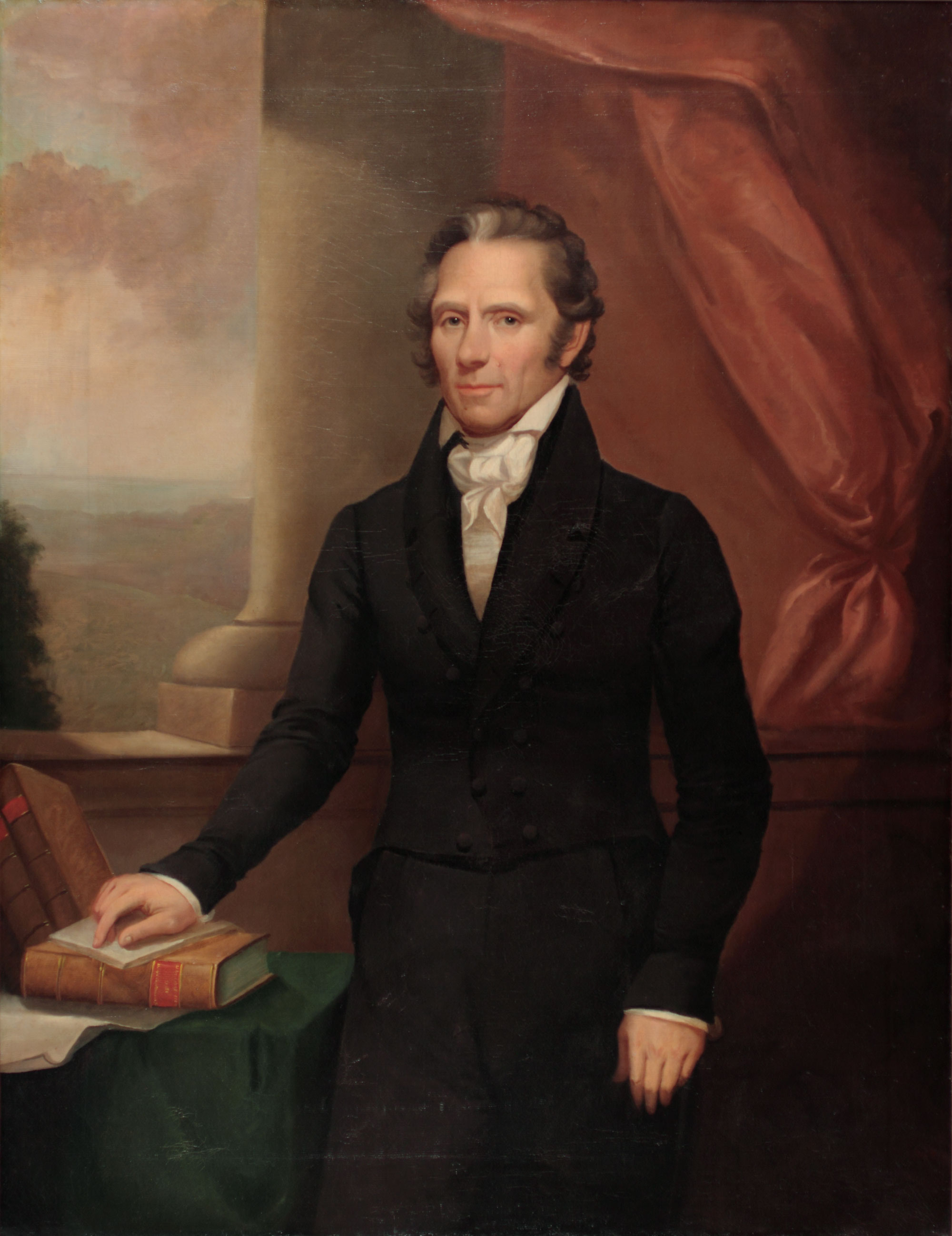

10th Governor of New York
- In office March 12, 1829 – December 31, 1832
- Lieutenant: Charles Stebbins (acting); William M. Oliver (acting); Edward Philip Livingston
- Preceded by: Martin Van Buren
- Succeeded by: William L. Marcy

Lieutenant Governor of New York
- In office January 1, 1829 – March 12, 1829
- Governor: Martin Van Buren
- Preceded by: Charles Dayan (acting)
- Succeeded by: Charles Stebbins (acting)

Member of the U.S. House of Representatives from New York's 20th district
- In office March 4, 1815 – June 4, 1816
- Preceded by: Daniel Avery; Oliver C. Comstock
- Succeeded by: Daniel Avery; Oliver C. Comstock

Personal details
- Born: August 21, 1784 Johnstown, New York
- Died: November 1, 1874 (aged 90) Auburn, New York
- Party: Jacksonian Democratic
- Spouse: Evelina J. Vredenburgh

Enos Thompson Throop (/ˈθruːp/ THROOP; August 21, 1784 – November 1, 1874) was an American lawyer, politician, and diplomat who was the tenth governor of New York from 1829 to 1832.

== Early life and career ==
Throop was born in Johnstown, New York on August 21, 1784, the eldest child of George Bliss Throop and Abiah Thompson. It was a political family; two of his mother's brothers, Israel Thompson and Jesse Thompson, served in the New York Assembly, his younger brother George B. Throop served in the state senate, and his half-sister Eliza married first U.S. Representative Gershom Powers and then U.S. Representative William B. Rochester. He studied law in Albany with attorney George Metcalfe, where he became friendly with his fellow student Martin Van Buren. His nephew and namesake Enos Thompson Throop Martin married Cornelia Williams Martin, a prominent philanthropist and social activist in Auburn, New York.

Throop was admitted to the bar in 1806, and began to practice law in Auburn. He joined the Democratic-Republican Party, and was appointed postmaster of the village, and in 1811 county clerk of Cayuga County.

In 1814, he married Evelina Vredenburgh, who died in 1834; she was the daughter of William Vredenburgh, an early landholder and investor in the area. None of their children survived infancy. The same year he was elected to the 14th United States Congress as a supporter of the war measures of the administration. He took part in the debates upon the measures to which the close of the war and the prostration of public and private credit gave rise. He also supported and voted for the act changing the compensation of congressmen from six dollars a day to $1,800 per annum, a course which temporarily clouded his political fortunes. Popular dissatisfaction with his actions was such that he was defeated at the congressional elections of April 1816, and resigned his seat on June 4, 1816. In April 1823, he was appointed Judge of the Seventh Circuit and remained on the bench until 1828 when he resigned.

== Governor ==
In 1828, he joined his friend Martin Van Buren's ticket for the gubernatorial election as the Democratic-Republican candidate for lieutenant governor, a step that rendered it necessary for him to resign his judicial office. It was expected that Andrew Jackson would be elected president at the same election, in which event Van Buren would be made secretary of state and would, if his appointment were confirmed, have to resign the office of governor and the leadership of the party, and with Throop as his lieutenant would keep both offices in the hands of a friend. These expectations were fulfilled, and Throop succeeded to the office of governor on March 12, 1829. He was re-elected governor in 1830, defeating again Francis Granger, who had been the contender for the lieutenant-governorship at the previous election. At this time the construction of the Chenango Canal became one of the chief questions of state policy. He opposed the plan, raising such a vehement opposition to him in the localities through which the proposed canal would pass, that in 1832 he declined to seek a third term. The French observer of America Alexis de Tocqueville visited Throop on his farm near Auburn and was amazed to find that the governor engaged in farming half the year to supplement his small salary.

== Later life ==
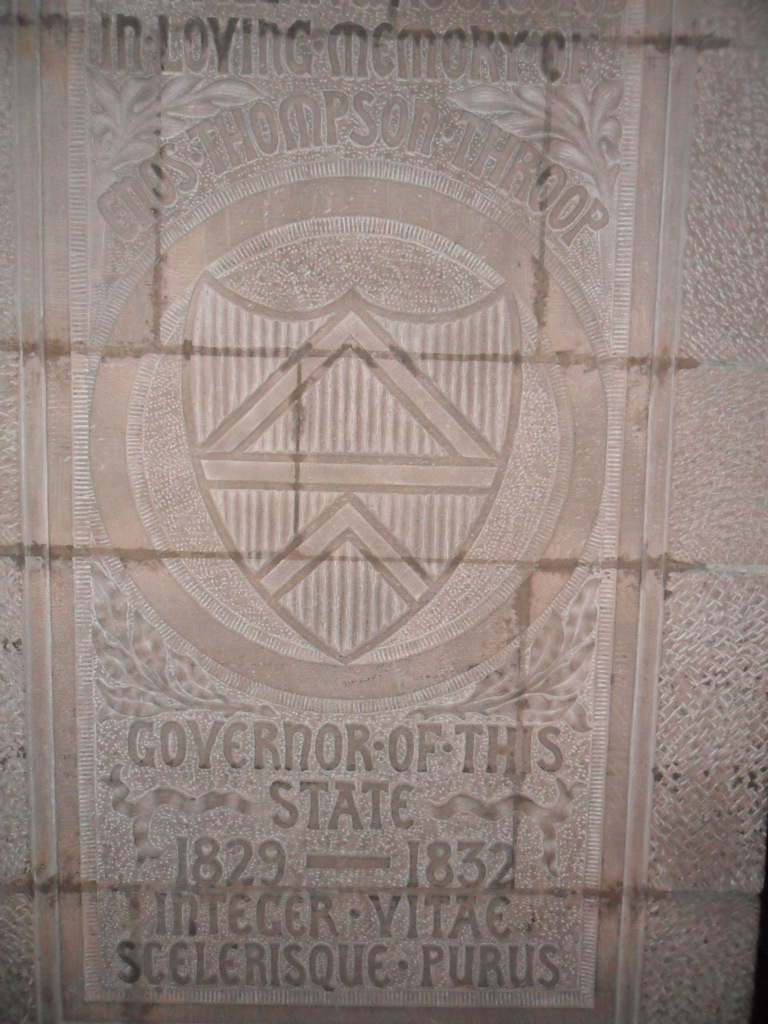
The Enos T. Throop memorial at the Cathedral of All Saints (Albany, New York).

In 1833 he was appointed by President Jackson naval officer at the Port of New York, which office he held until February 6, 1838, when President Van Buren appointed him Chargé d'affaires of the United States to the Kingdom of the Two Sicilies. On this post he remained until January 12, 1842. After spending two years in Paris, he returned to the United States, and resided upon an estate on the banks of Owasco Lake near Auburn. In 1847 he moved to Kalamazoo, Michigan, where he purchased a farm of 800 acres (3.2 km^{2}), and became noted among agriculturists. Advancing years compelled him to give up farming, and in 1857 he returned to his former home, removing in 1868 to New York City, but a few years later again returning to his residence near Auburn.

He died on his estate of Willowbrook, near Auburn, on November 1, 1874, aged 90. He was buried in the churchyard of St. Peter's Episcopal Church (now Sts. Peter and St. John Church) in Auburn.

There is a memorial to him at the Cathedral of All Saints (Albany, New York) (see image on this page) that states in Latin, integer vitae scelerisque purus, which means "upright of life and free from wickedness."

The Town of Throop, New York in Cayuga County is named after him.

Throop Avenue in Brooklyn (Kings County) and Throop Avenue in the Bronx are named after him.

== Sources ==
- Political Graveyard
- United States Congress. "Enos T. Throop (id: T000247)". Biographical Directory of the United States Congress.

Party political offices
Preceded by Martin Van Buren	Democratic nominee for Governor of New York; 1830	Succeeded by William L. Marcy
U.S. House of Representatives
Preceded by Daniel Avery, Oliver C. Comstock	Member of the U.S. House of Representatives from New York's 20th congressional district 1815–1816 with Oliver C. Comstock	Succeeded by Daniel Avery, Oliver C. Comstock
Legal offices
Preceded by new office	Judge of the Seventh Circuit of New York; 1823–1828	Succeeded by Daniel Moseley
Political offices
Preceded by Charles Dayan; Acting	Lieutenant Governor of New York; 1829	Succeeded by Charles Stebbins; Acting
Preceded by Martin Van Buren	Governor of New York; 1829–1832	Succeeded by William L. Marcy
Diplomatic posts
Preceded by John Nelson	United States Ambassador (as Chargé d'affaires) to the Two Sicilies; 1838–1841	Succeeded by William Boulware
