= Doughface =

19th century American political term

The term doughface originally referred to an actual mask made of dough, but came to be used in a disparaging context for someone, especially a politician, who is perceived to be pliable and moldable. In the 1847 Webster's Dictionary doughfacism was defined as "the willingness to be led about by one of stronger mind and will". In the years leading up to the American Civil War, "doughface" was used to describe Northerners who favored the Southern position in political disputes. Typically it was applied to a Northern Democrat who was more often allied with the Southern Democrats than with the majority of Northern Democrats.

== Origin of the term ==
Portrait and signature of John Randolph

The expression was coined by John Randolph, a Representative from Virginia, during the Missouri Compromise debates. Randolph had no respect for northerners who voted with the South, considering them, in historian Leonard Richards's words, "weak men, timid men, half-baked men". Randolph said of them:

They were scared at their own dough faces—yes, they were scared at their own dough faces!—We had them, and if we wanted three more, we could have had them: yes, and if these had failed, we could have three more of these men, whose conscience, and morality, and religion, extend to "thirty-six degrees and thirty minutes north latitude".

Randolph may actually have said "doe faces": the pronunciation would have been identical, and Randolph was a hunter, sometimes bringing his hunting dog with him to Congress. Ascribing "doe faces" (or "doe's faces") to those he despised would have been Randolph's comment on the weakness of these men. It's also possible he was referring to a game involving dough masks used to frighten people. The debate around what he actually meant by the term has "puzzled people almost from the moment that Randolph uttered it" according to Joanne Freeman.

In 1820, 17 doughfaces made the Missouri Compromise possible. In 1836, 60 northern congressmen voted with the South to pass a gag rule to prevent anti-slavery petitions from being formally received in the House of Representatives. In 1847, 27 northerners joined the South in opposing the Wilmot Proviso, and in 1850, 35 supported a stronger fugitive slave law. By 1854 the South had changed its position on the Missouri Compromise and 58 northerners supported its repeal in the Kansas–Nebraska Act.

== The 1850s ==
While the term originated in the House, doughfaces eventually had their greatest influence in the United States Senate. In the House the greater growth of the northern population gave it a greater proportion of votes, but in the Senate the even balance of slave and free states required that only a few northerners needed to support the South in order to hold the House in check. One of the clearest cases came in the Wilmot Proviso votes of 1846 and 1847 when the Senate rejected the Proviso after its passage in the House. Another case was during the 1850 passage of the Fugitive Slave Act, when a number of Northern congressmen left the House in order to not have to vote, leading to mockery and Thaddeus Stevens suggesting a congressional page be sent to let them know "that they may now come back into the Hall" after the vote had taken place.

Many Southerners still looked at these doughfaces from the same perspective as Randolph—weak men who, without any firm moral commitment to their cause other than political expediency, could prove unreliable at some critical point in the future. Richards has classified 320 congressmen in the period from 1820 to 1860 as doughfaces. The two U.S. Presidents preceding Abraham Lincoln, Franklin Pierce and James Buchanan, were both commonly called doughfaces. Lincoln called Stephen A. Douglas the "worst doughface of them all", even though he broke with his party over the Lecompton Constitution for Kansas in 1857. Other such doughfaces were Charles G. Atherton, the author of the gag rule, and Jesse D. Bright, the only northern senator expelled for treason during the Civil War.

The doughfaces' ultimate weakness, from a Southern perspective, was on the issue of popular sovereignty. At the time of the Kansas-Nebraska Act, both the northern and southern Democrats accepted popular sovereignty as the proper states' rights position. It protected against federal consolidation and insured the equality of the states to compete in the territories. Douglas and many northern Democrats remained consistent through 1860 in their support for popular sovereignty. Southerners, on the other hand, saw the increasing strength of the anti-slavery movement in the North and by the late 1850s were no longer content simply to rely on preventing the federal government from interfering in the territories, but insisted on federal intervention to protect slavery there and prevent any decision on slavery until a territory prepared a constitution as part of an application for statehood. Northern Democrats such as Douglas could not go that far with the South. The doughface, as an agent for sectional compromise, had outlived his usefulness.

John Russell Bartlett's 1848 Dictionary of Americanisms defined the word as a "contemptuous nickname, applied to the northern favorers and abettors of negro slavery." The phrase was often meant as a personal insult; Doughfaces were even charged with being "white slaves" suffering from "slavery of the mind," and Henry Clay said the phrase "did more injury than any two words I have ever known." When John C. Calhoun implied Franklin Pierce was a doughface, Pierce responded that he would physically fight anyone who called him by that name, even after Calhoun had already apologized.

Walt Whitman used the phrase for his 1850 poem "Song for Certain Congressmen" which was later revised as the "Dough-Face Song" which begins:

We are all docile Dough-Faces,
They knead us with the fist,
They, the dashing southern lords,
We labor as they list;

== Modern usage ==
In Arthur M. Schlesinger, Jr.'s 1949 book The Vital Center, he applied the term to modern liberalism in the United States, referring to the part of the movement perceived as practicing appeasement of Joseph Stalin's Soviet Union. Journalist Hal Crowther argued for resurrecting the term in 2005 relating to Bush-era policies such as the Iraq War.

== See also ==
- Copperhead (politics)
- Origins of the American Civil War
