= New York Court of Common Pleas =

The New York Court of Common Pleas was a state court in New York. Established in the Province of New York in 1686, the Court remained in existence in the Province and, after the American Revolution, in the U.S. state of New York until it was abolished in 1894.

James Wilton Brooks wrote in History of the Court of common pleas of the city and county of New York (1896) that:

The Court of Common Pleas, founded in 1686, in the City of New York, extended in 1691 throughout the State, restricted again in 1846 to the City of New York, and finally, in accordance with the amended State Constitution of 1894, passing out of existence on the thirty-first of December, 1895, was the oldest judicial tribunal in the state of New York. It succeeded "The Worshipful Court of the Schout, Burgomasters and Schepens", which was established in 1653 and may thus be said to have had a continuous existence of nearly two centuries and a half.

== New Netherland ==
The Dutch West India Company established the colony of New Netherland, centered around New Amsterdam in Manhattan, in 1623. Brooks wrote that for many years no provision was made for the administration for justice in the colony. In 1623, Peter Minuit, shortly after being appointed Director-General of New Netherland, formed a council of five, which held legislative, executive, and judicial powers. A Dutch colonial official called the Schout was also attached to this body. Together the Governor, Schout, and Council were supervised by the Dutch colonial authorities at Amsterdam. These authorities carried out judicial powers from 1626 to 1637, during Minuit's six years as Director-General and during four years of the term of his successor, Wouter van Twiller.

Although records were kept, no records have survived detailing judicial proceedings under the council. The Schout Fiscal was a combination of prosecutor, sheriff, chief of police, constable, and warden with the duty to "under the orders of the Governor's Council to arrest and arraign on behalf of the Company all persons accused of crime, to superintend the trial, and see to the proper carrying out of the sentence." Despite this concentration of powers, however, some rights of the accused were observed, including the consideration of evidence for the prisoner and a speedy trial. The Schout was also required to "keep a strict account of all information taken by him and of all criminal trials, and regularly transmit reports to the Company's main offices in Holland." The Schout also has executive power to enforce the laws and rules of the States-General of the Netherlands.

Patroon courts were first established in 1630. Patroons (from the Dutch for owner or head of a company) were landholders with manorial rights to large tracts of land in New Netherland in North America along the Hudson River. Through the Charter of Freedoms and Exemptions of 1629, the Dutch West India Company first started to grant this title and land to some of its invested members. These inducements to foster immigration were known as the "Rights and Exemptions," more commonly known as the patroon system. patroon acted as feudal lords, with the power to create civil and criminal courts, appoint local officials and hold land in perpetuity, and in return was commissioned by the Dutch West India Company to establish a settlement of at least 50 families within four years on the land. The patroon exercised within his authority "unlimited civil and criminal jurisdiction...even the power of life and death," subject to an appeal to the Governor.

When Peter Stuyvesant became governor in 1647, he immediately established a Court of Justice with the broad jurisdiction to decide "all cases whatsoever," with the directive to refer cases of any importance to the governor for approval. Brooks wrote that this scheme produced "popular discount," resulting in a "wrangle between the governor and the colonies, which brought about a number of trips to Holland, covered a number of years and abounded in dramatic incidents."

This led to the formation in 1653, of The Worshipful Court of the Schout, Burgomasters and Schepens. This tribunal consisted of the Schout, four Burgomasters, and nine Schepens. Like the Schout, the position of the Burgomaster and Schepen came from the Netherlands. The Burgomasters were administrators who rotated three-month terms "to attend at City Hall for the dispatch of public business." Schepens (aldermen) were judicial officers with jurisdiction over civil and criminal matters. Together, the three orders of officers formed a college and enacted laws and ordinances for the city, analogous to the General Court of the Massachusetts Bay Colony. The body, collectively known as the Lords of the Court of the City of New Amsterdam, was headed either by a chosen president or the senior Burgomaster.

The court was held at least every two weeks and often every week; the parties before the court stated the case and the judges rendered a decision based on the facts or arbitrators were appointed to review the case and proposed a compromise between the parties. Appeals to the court from the arbitrators' decisions were rare. In the case of a difference in how parties stated the facts, witnesses were called and affidavits presented or depositions taken.

== Province of New York ==
In 1664 the colony became part of British North America as the Province of New York, and New Amsterdam was named New York. The Court of Common Pleas was established in New York City in 1686 under the Dongan Charter, the early municipal Charter of the City of New York, granted by Governor Thomas Dongan on July 22, 1686. The Charter provided that the Mayor, Recorder, and Alderman, or any three of them given that either the Recorder or Mayor was one, were authorized to hold the Court of Common Pleas (Mayor's Court), which was presided over by the Mayor and Recorder alternately. An Act of 1691 created a Court of Common Pleas in each of New York's counties, which at the time numbered 12.

Judges and clerks were appointed by the governor of New York and held office at his pleasure or during good behavior. The court's jurisdiction extended to all actions in which the amount in controversy exceeded five English pounds. After 1691, appeals to the decisions of the court went to the Supreme Court of the province of New York, which heard appeals in which the amount involved exceeded 20 pounds. Brooks wrote that the Court of Common Pleas was often known under the original Dutch title, even as late as 1821, and was called the Mayors' Court, with its criminal branch known as the New York Court of General Sessions.

== New York City ==
The Mayor's Court was continued through the colonial period, and records are uncertain as to whether the court was held during the American Revolutionary War. In early 1784, James Duane was appointed mayor of New York City, and from that time after the Court was in continuing existence until its abolition. Under Duane, who served in the Continental Congress, notable figures including Alexander Hamilton, Aaron Burr, Robert Troup, Edward Livingston, Henry Brockholst Livingston, Egbert Benson, Morgan Lewis, and Josiah Ogden Hoffman practiced before the Court. Duane presided until 1789, when the President George Washington appointed him to the U.S. District Court for the District of New York.

When Maturin Livingston was Recorder of New York City, Mayor DeWitt Clinton ceased to preside in the Mayor's Court, and from that time on the Recorder sat as presiding judge. By 1821, the mayor had ceased to preside completely as the docket had increased substantially in size. John Anthon, a prominent lawyer, wrote an act to change the name to the Court of Common Pleas of the City of New York, and to create the position of First Judge. The New York Legislature passed the bill. Although the Mayor, Recorder, and Aldermen still had the power to preside over the Court of Common Pleas, the First Judge was given special responsibility for the court and had the power to hold court himself without the Recorder or Mayor. John T. Irving was appointed First Judge. In 1834, an Associate Judge was provided, with all the powers of the First Judge. Michael Ulshoffer was appointed to the post. In 1839, a third judge was provided for due to an increase in the court's workload; William Inglis was appointed as Associate Judge.

Charles Patrick Daly served as a judge of the New York Court of Common Pleas 1844–1857, as First Judge 1857–1871, and as Chief Justice 1871–1885.

The Court of Common Pleas for the City of New York was abolished in 1895.
