= Gershom Powers =

American politician

Member of the U.S. House of Representatives from New York's 24th district
- In office March 4, 1829 – March 3, 1831
- Preceded by: Nathaniel Garrow
- Succeeded by: Ulysses F. Doubleday

Personal details
- Born: 11 July 1789 Croydon, New Hampshire, U.S.
- Died: June 25, 1831 (aged 41) Auburn, New York, U.S.

Gershom Powers (July 11, 1789 – June 25, 1831) was an American lawyer, jurist, and law enforcement officer who served one term as a U.S. representative from New York from 1829 to 1831.

== Biography ==
Born in Croydon, New Hampshire, Powers attended the common schools and was largely self-taught. He taught school in the town of Sempronius, New York, while attending the local law school, from which he graduated in 1810. He was admitted to New York State Bar Association the same year and commenced practice in Auburn, New York.

He was appointed Warden of Auburn Prison from 1820 to 1823. First judge of the court of common pleas of Cayuga County 1823–1828.

=== Congress ===
Powers was elected as a Jacksonian to the Twenty-first Congress (March 4, 1829 – March 3, 1831). He served as chairman of the Committee on District of Columbia (Twenty-first Congress). He declined to be a candidate for renomination in 1830.

=== Later career and death ===
He was appointed inspector of Auburn prison on April 2, 1830, and served until his death. He died in Auburn, New York, June 25, 1831. He was interred in North Street Cemetery.

=== Family ===
He was married to Eliza Hatch (1800–1885), a half-sister of Gov. Enos T. Throop. In 1832, his widow married Judge William B. Rochester (1789–1838).

== Sources ==
- United States Congress. "Gershom Powers (id: P000489)". Biographical Directory of the United States Congress.

U.S. House of Representatives
Preceded by Nathaniel Garrow	Member of the U.S. House of Representatives from New York's 24th congressional district March 4, 1829 – March 3, 1831	Succeeded by Ulysses F. Doubleday
