= 1826 United States House of Representatives elections in New York =

United States House of Representatives elections in New York, 1826
- November 6–8, 1826

All 34 New York seats to the United States House of Representatives
	Majority party	Minority party
Party	Jacksonian	Anti-Jacksonian
Last election	8	26
Seats won	20	14
Seat change	▲12	▼12

The 1826 United States House of Representatives elections in New York were held from November 6 to 8, 1826, to elect 34 U.S. Representatives to represent the State of New York in the United States House of Representatives of the 20th United States Congress.

== Background ==
34 U.S. Representatives had been elected in November 1824 to a term in the 19th United States Congress, beginning on March 4, 1825. Daniel Hugunin Jr. had contested the election of Egbert Ten Eyck, and was seated in December 1825. The representatives' term would end on March 3, 1827. The elections were held with the annual State election on the first Monday in November and the two succeeding days, about four months before the congressional term began, and a little more than a year before Congress actually met on December 3, 1827.

At this time the Democratic-Republican Party in New York was split into two opposing factions: on one side, the "Clintonians", the supporters of DeWitt Clinton and his Erie Canal project; on the other side, the Bucktails (including the Tammany Hall organization in New York City), led by Martin Van Buren.

In federal politics, the Clintonians aligned with President John Quincy Adams, the Bucktails opposed Adams and supported Andrew Jackson; thus the Congressman were labeled either Adams men (later the National Republican Party) or Jacksonians (later the Democratic Party).

== Congressional districts ==
The geographical area of the congressional districts remained the same as at the previous elections in 1824. Only one new county was created: in the 29th District, Orleans Co. was split from Genesee Co.

- The 1st District comprising Queens and Suffolk counties.
- The 2nd District comprising Kings, Richmond and Rockland counties.
- The 3rd District (three seats) comprising New York County.
- The 4th District comprising Westchester and Putnam counties.
- The 5th District comprising Dutchess County.
- The 6th District comprising Orange County.
- The 7th District comprising Ulster and Sullivan counties.
- The 8th District comprising Columbia County.
- The 9th District comprising Rensselaer County.
- The 10th District comprising Albany County.
- The 11th District comprising Delaware and Greene counties.
- The 12th District comprising Schenectady and Schoharie counties.
- The 13th District comprising Otsego County.
- The 14th District comprising Oneida County.
- The 15th District comprising Herkimer County.
- The 16th District comprising Montgomery County.
- The 17th District comprising Saratoga County.
- The 18th District comprising Washington County.
- The 19th District comprising Clinton, Essex, Franklin and Warren counties.
- The 20th District (two seats) comprising St. Lawrence, Jefferson, Lewis and Oswego counties.
- The 21st District comprising Chenango and Broome counties.
- The 22nd District comprising Madison and Cortland counties.
- The 23rd District comprising Onondaga County.
- The 24th District comprising Cayuga County.
- The 25th District comprising Tioga and Tompkins counties.
- The 26th District (two seats) comprising Ontario, Seneca, Wayne and Yates counties.
- The 27th District comprising Monroe and Livingston counties.
- The 28th District comprising Steuben, Allegany and Cattaraugus counties.
- The 29th District comprising Genesee and Orleans counties.
- The 30th District comprising Niagara, Chautauqua and Erie counties.

Note: There are now 62 counties in the State of New York. The counties which are not mentioned in this list had not yet been established, or sufficiently organized, the area being included in one or more of the abovementioned counties.

== Result ==
The incumbents Silas Wood, Cambreleng, Johnson, Verplanck, Ward, Hallock, Strong, Van Rensselaer, Storrs, Hoffman, Markell, Taylor, Martindale, Marvin and Garnsey were re-elected. The incumbents Fosdick, John Miller, Badger, Humphrey and Porter were defeated.

1826 United States House election result
District	Bucktails/Jacksonian	Clintonian/Anti-Jacksonian	also ran	also ran
1st		Silas Wood		
2nd	John J. Wood			
3rd	Churchill C. Cambreleng			
3rd	Gulian C. Verplanck			
3rd	Jeromus Johnson			
4th		Aaron Ward		
5th	Thomas J. Oakley			
6th	John Hallock Jr.	Hector Craig		
7th	George O. Belden	Lemuel Jenkins		
8th	Walter Patterson	James Strong		
9th	James L. Hogeboom	John D. Dickinson		
10th	unopposed	Stephen Van Rensselaer		
11th	Selah R. Hobbie	Isaac Burr		
12th	John I. De Graff	unopposed		
13th		Samuel Chase		
14th	Ezekiel Bacon	Henry R. Storrs		
15th	Michael Hoffman			
16th	Aaron Haring	Henry Markell		
17th	Alpheus Goodrich	John W. Taylor		
18th	John Willard	Henry C. Martindale		
19th	Richard Keese	Asa Hascall		
20th	Silas Wright Jr.	Nicoll Fosdick		
20th	Rudolph Bunner	Elisha Camp		
21st	John C. Clark	Robert Monell		
22nd	John G. Stower	John Miller		
23rd	Jonas Earll Jr.	Luther Badger		
24th	Nathaniel Garrow	Elijah Miller		
25th	David Woodcock	Charles Humphrey		
26th		Dudley Marvin		
26th	John Maynard			
27th	Enos Pomeroy	Daniel D. Barnard		
28th	John Magee	Timothy H. Porter	William Woods (Buckt.)	Philip Church
29th	David E. Evans	Simeon Cummings		
30th	Daniel G. Garnsey	Albert H. Tracy		

== Aftermath and special elections ==
David E. Evans, elected as a Jacksonian in the 29th District, was appointed Resident Agent of the Holland Land Company at Batavia, and resigned his seat on May 2, 1827, before the 20th Congress convened. A special election to fill the vacancy was held at the time of the annual State election in November, and was won by Adams man Phineas L. Tracy.

The House of Representatives of the 20th United States Congress met for the first time at the United States Capitol in Washington, D.C., on December 3, 1827, and 33 of the representatives, including Phineas L. Tracy, took their seats on this day. Only Thomas J. Oakley arrived later and took his seat on December 17.

Shortly before the end of the first session, Thomas J. Oakley accepted an appointment as a judge of the Superior Court of New York City, and sent a letter of resignation which was read in the House on May 9, 1828. A special election to fill the vacancy was held, and was won by Thomas Taber II who took his seat on December 1, 1828.

Silas Wright Jr., was elected New York State Comptroller on January 27, 1829, and sent a letter of resignation which was read in the House on February 16. The seat remained vacant for the remaining two weeks of this Congress.

== See also ==
- 1826 and 1827 United States House of Representatives elections

== Sources ==
- Michael J. Dubin, United States Congressional Elections, 1788-1997: The Official Results (McFarland, 1998).
- The New York Civil List compiled in 1858 (see: pg. 66 for district apportionment; pg. 71f for Congressmen)
- Members of the Twentieth United States Congress
