= 1824 United States House of Representatives elections in New York =

United States House of Representatives elections in New York, 1824
- November 1–3, 1824

All 34 New York seats to the United States House of Representatives
| | Majority party | Minority party |
|---|---|---|
| Party | Anti-Jacksonian | Jacksonian |
| Last election | 18 | 2 |
| Seats won | 25 | 9 |
| Seat change | ▲8 | ▲6 |

The 1824 United States House of Representatives elections in New York were held from November 1 to 3, 1824, to elect 34 U.S. Representatives to represent the State of New York in the United States House of Representatives of the 19th United States Congress.

== Background ==
34 U.S. Representatives had been elected in November 1822 to a term in the 18th United States Congress, beginning on March 4, 1823. William B. Rochester had resigned his seat in April 1823, and William Woods was elected to fill the vacancy. Parmenio Adams had contested the election of Isaac Wilson, and was seated in January 1824. The representatives' term would end on March 3, 1825. The elections were held with the annual State election on the first Monday in November and the two succeeding days, about four months before the congressional term began, and a little more than a year before Congress actually met on December 5, 1825.

At this time the Democratic-Republican Party in New York was split into two opposing factions: on one side, the supporters of DeWitt Clinton and his Erie Canal project; on the other side, the Bucktails (including the Tammany Hall organization in New York City), led by Martin Van Buren. At the same time, the Federalist Party had already disbanded, and most of its former members had joined the Clintonians.

At the same time, party lines broke down concerning the 1824 United States presidential election. The Bucktails' leader Van Buren supported William H. Crawford, and most of the Clintonians supported John Quincy Adams. Andrew Jackson and Henry Clay also disputed the election, but found more support in other States. Since 1792, presidential electors had been elected by the New York State Legislature, but with a four-way race in the offing, a movement to change the mode of election was started: The "People's Party" advocated the election of presidential electors by popular ballot in districts, and nominated DeWitt Clinton for Governor of New York.

== Congressional districts ==
The geographical area of the congressional districts remained the same as at the previous elections in 1822. Two new counties were created within the 26th district: Wayne Co. and Yates Co.

- The 1st district comprising Queens and Suffolk counties.
- The 2nd district comprising Kings, Richmond and Rockland counties.
- The 3rd district (three seats) comprising New York County.
- The 4th district comprising Westchester and Putnam counties.
- The 5th district comprising Dutchess County.
- The 6th district comprising Orange County.
- The 7th district comprising Ulster and Sullivan counties.
- The 8th district comprising Columbia County.
- The 9th district comprising Rensselaer County.
- The 10th district comprising Albany County.
- The 11th district comprising Delaware and Greene counties.
- The 12th district comprising Schenectady and Schoharie counties.
- The 13th district comprising Otsego County.
- The 14th district comprising Oneida County.
- The 15th district comprising Herkimer County.
- The 16th district comprising Montgomery County.
- The 17th district comprising Saratoga County.
- The 18th district comprising Washington County.
- The 19th district comprising Clinton, Essex, Franklin and Warren counties.
- The 20th district (two seats) comprising St. Lawrence, Jefferson, Lewis and Oswego counties.
- The 21st district comprising Chenango and Broome counties.
- The 22nd district comprising Madison and Cortland counties.
- The 23rd district comprising Onondaga County.
- The 24th district comprising Cayuga County.
- The 25th district comprising Tioga and Tompkins counties.
- The 26th district (two seats) comprising Ontario, Seneca, Wayne and Yates counties.
- The 27th district comprising Monroe and Livingston counties.
- The 28th district comprising Steuben, Allegany and Cattaraugus counties.
- The 29th district comprising Genesee County.
- The 30th district comprising Niagara, Chautauqua and Erie counties.

Note: There are now 62 counties in the State of New York. The counties which are not mentioned in this list had not yet been established, or sufficiently organized, the area being included in one or more of the abovementioned counties.

== Result ==
23 People's Party men and 11 Bucktails were declared elected. The incumbents Wood, Cambreleng, Strong, Van Rensselaer, Storrs, Taylor, Martindale, Ten Eyck, Marvin, Rose, Hayden and Adams were re-elected; the incumbents Sharpe, Craig, Herkimer, Clark, Litchfield, Day and Woods were defeated.

1824 United States House election result
| District | People's Party | | Democratic-Republican/Bucktails | | also ran | |
|---|---|---|---|---|---|---|
| 1st | Silas Wood | 2,140 | James Lent | 1,398 | | |
| 2nd | Joshua Sands | 1,683 | John T. Bergen | 1,484 | | |
| 3rd | John Rathbone Jr. | 3,981 | Churchill C. Cambreleng | 5,718 | Henry Wheaton | 750 |
| 3rd | Charles G. Haines | 3,857 | Gulian C. Verplanck | 4,877 | | |
| 3rd | Peter Sharpe | 3,741 | Jeromus Johnson | 4,588 | | |
| 4th | Aaron Ward | 1,586 | Jonathan Ward | 1,297 | John Hunter (Buckt.) | 1,188 |
| 5th | Bartow White | 3,596 | Peter R. Livingston | 3,210 | | |
| 6th | Hector Craig | 1,978 | John Hallock Jr. | 2,105 | Walter Case (Buckt.) | 374 |
| 7th | Abraham B. Hasbrouck | 2,917 | John Lounsbery | 2,781 | | |
| 8th | James Strong | 3,130 | Robert Le Roy Livingston | 2,089 | | |
| 9th | William McManus | 3,807 | George R. Davis | 2,925 | | |
| 10th | Stephen Van Rensselaer | 3,850 | | | | |
| 11th | William V. B. Hermance | 2,698 | Henry Ashley | 3,531 | Amos Hamlin | 64 |
| 12th | Constant Brown | 2,129 | William Dietz | 2,810 | Henry Greene (PP) | 54 |
| 13th | William Campbell | 2,357 | William G. Angel | 3,379 | | |
| 14th | Henry R. Storrs | 4,146 | James Lynch | 3,094 | | |
| 15th | John Herkimer | 2,164 | Michael Hoffman | 2,410 | | |
| 16th | Henry Markell | 3,115 | William I. Dodge | 2,148 | | |
| 17th | John W. Taylor | 3,858 | | | | |
| 18th | Henry C. Martindale | 3,449 | John Gale | 1,893 | | |
| 19th | Henry H. Ross | 3,210 | William Hogan | 2,933 | | |
| 20th | Nicoll Fosdick | 5,676 | Horace Allen | 5,472 | "Daniel Hugunin, junior" | 275 |
| 20th | Daniel Hugunin, jun. | 5,188 | Egbert Ten Eyck | 5,484 | "Daniel Hugunin" | 195 |
| 21st | Elias Whitmore | 3,128 | Lot Clark | 3,073 | | |
| 22nd | John Miller | 3,857 | John Lynde | 3,243 | | |
| 23rd | Luther Badger | 3,214 | Elisha Litchfield | 3,116 | | |
| 24th | Charles Kellogg | 3,372 | Rowland Day | 2,976 | | |
| 25th | Charles Humphrey | 3,144 | David Woodcock | 2,999 | | |
| 26th | Dudley Marvin | 8,367 | John Maynard | 4,438 | | |
| 26th | Robert S. Rose | 4,901 | Aaron Remer | 2,732 | | |
| 27th | Moses Hayden | 4,456 | Charles H. Carroll | 3,028 | | |
| 28th | Daniel Cruger | 1,693 | Timothy H. Porter | 2,100 | William Woods (Buckt.) | 1,937 |
| 29th | Parmenio Adams | 4,035 | Isaac Wilson | 2,969 | | |
| 30th | William Hotchkiss | 2,235 | Daniel G. Garnsey | 2,387 | John G. Camp (Buckt.) | 2,127 |

Note: Of the People's Party candidates, Wood, Sands, Strong, Van Rensselaer, Campbell and Storrs were old Federalists; Haines, Craig, Taylor, Marvin, Hayden and Adams were old Clintonians; and Sharpe, Herkimer, Martindale and Rose were elected as Bucktails in 1822.

== Aftermath, presidential election and contested election ==
No change in the mode of election of presidential electors was enacted this year. On November 11, 1824, the New York State Legislature chose 36 presidential electors of whom 26 voted for John Quincy Adams, 5 for William H. Crawford, 4 for Henry Clay and 1 for Andrew Jackson. No candidate received a majority in the electoral college vote at the 1824 United States presidential election, and the election was referred to the House of Representatives, to choose among the three most voted candidates: Adams, Jackson and Crawford. Henry Clay supported Adams, so that after the contingent election on February 9, 1825, one month before the end of the term of the 18th Congress, the members were back-labeled (according to their actual vote) as "Adams-Clay Democratic-Republicans" (Sharpe, Van Wyck, Williams, Herkimer, Cady, Taylor, Martindale, Lawrence, Marvin, Rose, Hayden, Woods, Adams and Tracy), "Jackson Democratic-Republicans" (Morgan and Craig), "Crawford Democratic-Republicans" (Tyson, Cambreleng, Frost, Jenkins, Hoogeboom, Foote, Eaton, Richards, Ten Eyck, Collins, Clark, Dwinell, Litchfield, Day) and "Adams-Clay Federalists" (Wood, Strong, Van Rensselaer, Storrs).

After this fiasco, Martin Van Buren abandoned Crawford, and re-organized his Bucktails supporting Andrew Jackson. In the 19th Congress the members were split into the supporters of President Adams (known as "Adams men", later becoming the "Anti-Jacksonians" and the National Republican Party) and the supporters of Andrew Jackson (known as "Jacksonians", later becoming the Democratic Party).

The House of Representatives of the 19th United States Congress met for the first time at the United States Capitol in Washington, D.C., on December 5, 1825, and 32 of the representatives, among them Egbert Ten Eyck took their seats on this day. Rose took his seat on December 7; and Whitmore on January 16, 1826.

On December 9, 1825, Henry R. Storrs presented a petition on behalf of Daniel Hugunin Jr. contesting the election of Egbert Ten Eyck in the 20th District. On December 15, the Committee on Elections submitted its report. They found that 142 votes in St. Lawrence County, and 53 votes in Lewis County had been returned for "Daniel Hugunin"; and 275 votes in Jefferson County had been returned for "Daniel Hugunin, junior"; all these listed among the "scattering votes." The Secretary of State of New York, receiving the abovementioned result, issued credentials for Ten Eyck who took his seat when Congress met on December 5. The petition included testimony by the election inspectors that 271 votes in Watertown, 93 votes in Madrid, and 48 votes in Louisville had been in fact given for "Daniel Hugunin, jun." but had been certified mistakenly. Adding these votes to the 5,188 returned for "Daniel Hugunin, jun.", Hugunin had a recognized total of 5,600 votes, 116 more than Ten Eyck. The committee declared Hugunin Jr., entitled to the seat instead of Ten Eyck. The House concurred without opposition, and Hugunin Jr., took his seat.

After Hugunin Jr. was seated on December 15, 1825, of the 34 representatives from New York there were 25 Adams men and 9 Jacksonians: the People's Party men supported Adams; the Bucktails supported Jackson, except Porter who was described as an "Adams Bucktail."

== See also ==
- 1824 and 1825 United States House of Representatives elections
- List of United States representatives from New York

== Sources ==
- The New York Civil List compiled in 1858 (see: pg. 66 for district apportionment; pg. 71 for Congressmen; page 321 pr New York's electoral votes; page 326 for New York's presidential electors)
- Members of the Nineteenth United States Congress
- Election result 1st D. at project "A New Nation Votes", compiled by Phil Lampi, hosted by Tufts University Digital Library
- Election result 2nd D. at "A New Nation Votes"
- Election result 3rd D. at "A New Nation Votes"
- Election result 4th D. at "A New Nation Votes"
- Election result 5th D. at "A New Nation Votes"
- Election result 6th D. at "A New Nation Votes"
- Election result 7th D. at "A New Nation Votes"
- Election result 8th D. at "A New Nation Votes"
- Election result 9th D. at "A New Nation Votes"
- Election result 10th D. at "A New Nation Votes"
- Election result 11th D. at "A New Nation Votes"
- Election result 12th D. at "A New Nation Votes"
- Election result 13th D. at "A New Nation Votes"
- Election result 14th D. at "A New Nation Votes"
- Election result 15th D. at "A New Nation Votes"
- Election result 16th D. at "A New Nation Votes"
- Election result 17th D. at "A New Nation Votes"
- Election result 18th D. at "A New Nation Votes"
- Election result 19th D. at "A New Nation Votes"
- Election result 20th D. at "A New Nation Votes" [gives 5,665 votes for Hugunin]
- Election result 21st D. at "A New Nation Votes"
- Election result 22nd D. at "A New Nation Votes"
- Election result 23rd D. at "A New Nation Votes"
- Election result 24th D. at "A New Nation Votes"
- Election result 25th D. at "A New Nation Votes"
- Election result 26th D. at "A New Nation Votes"
- Election result 27th D. at "A New Nation Votes"
- Election result 28th D. at "A New Nation Votes"
- Election result 29th D. at "A New Nation Votes"
- Election result 30th D. at "A New Nation Votes"
