= William Collins (New York politician) =

American politician

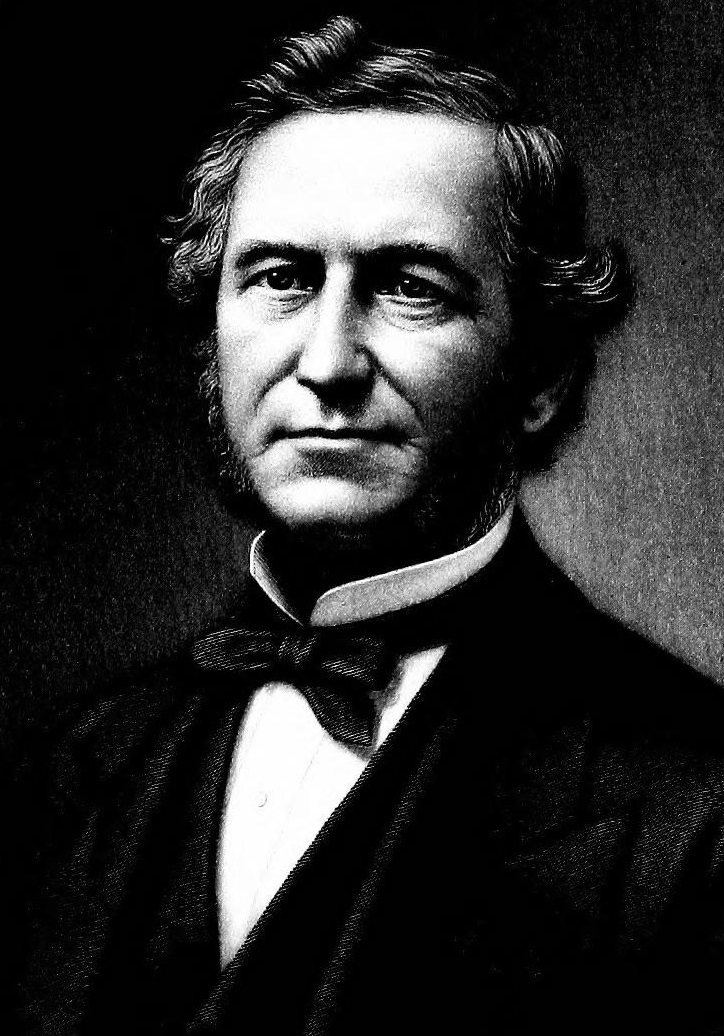

Member of the U.S. House of Representatives from New York's 18th district
- In office March 4, 1847 – March 3, 1849
- Preceded by: Preston King
- Succeeded by: Preston King

District attorney of Lewis County, New York
- In office March 1845 – March 1847
- Preceded by: Charles Dayan
- Succeeded by: David M. Bennett

Personal details
- Born: February 22, 1818 Lowville, New York, US
- Died: June 18, 1878 (aged 60) Cleveland, Ohio, US
- Party: Democratic
- Spouse: Jane Kelley
- Profession: Attorney

William Collins (February 22, 1818 – June 18, 1878) was an American lawyer and politician who served one term as a United States representative from New York from 1847 to 1849.

== Biography ==
Collins was born in Lowville on February 22, 1818, and was the son of Congressman Ela Collins and Maria Clinton Collins.

=== Congress ===
He studied law with his father, was admitted to the bar and commenced practice in Lowville. He served as district attorney for Lewis County from March 1845 until March 1847, when he resigned because he had been elected as a Democrat to the Thirtieth Congress (March 4, 1847 – March 3, 1849). He declined to be a candidate for renomination in 1848.

In November 1847, William Collins married Jane Kelley; they had seven children.

=== Later career and death ===
Collins moved to Cleveland, Ohio in 1853 and continued the practice of law, and also engaged in banking and business. He served as a director of the Lake Shore Railroad and East Cleveland Railroad. He affiliated with the Republican Party upon its organization in 1856, and died in Cleveland on June 18, 1878. His interment was in Lake View Cemetery.

== Sources ==
- United States Congress. "William Collins (id: C000644)". Biographical Directory of the United States Congress.

U.S. House of Representatives
Preceded by Preston King	Member of the U.S. House of Representatives from New York's 18th congressional district 1847–1849	Succeeded by Preston King
