= Daniel Wardwell =

American politician

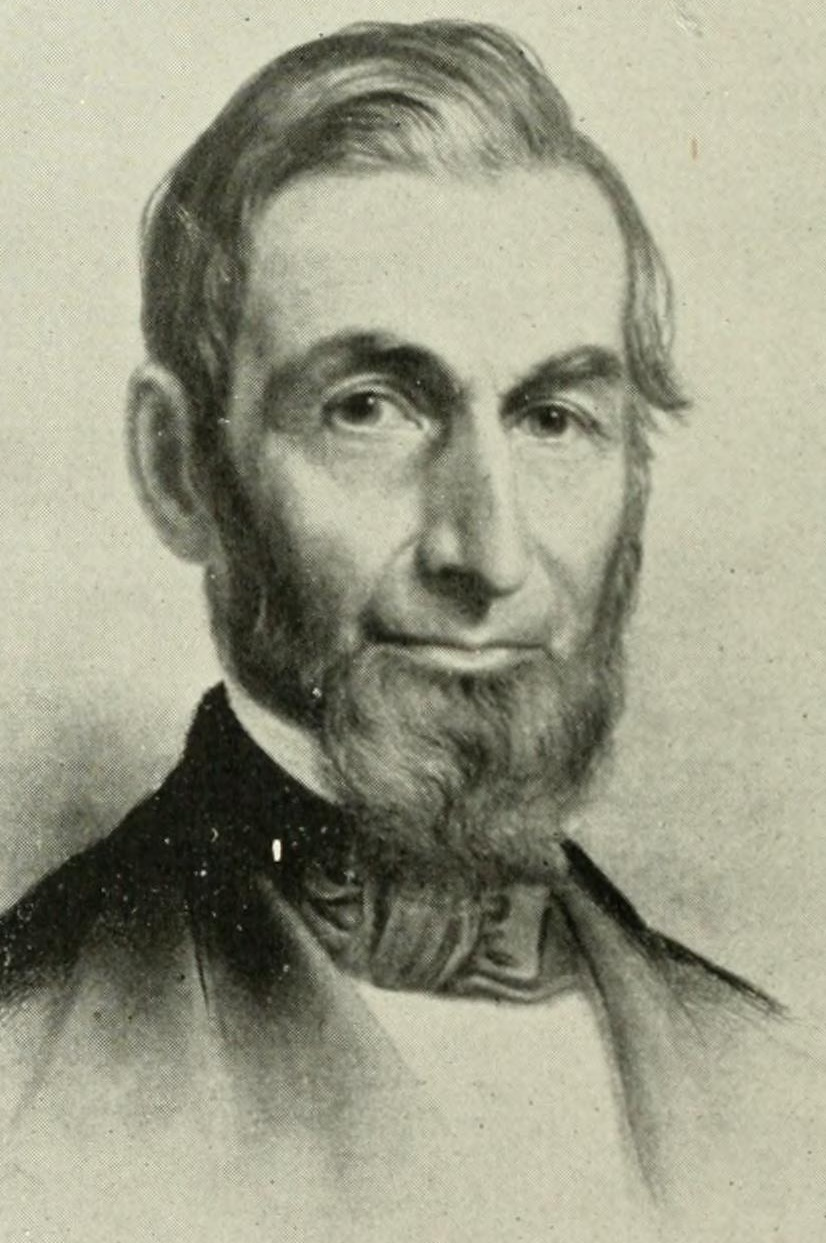

Member of the U.S. House of Representatives from New York
- In office March 4, 1831 – March 3, 1837
- Preceded by: Jonah Sanford, Joseph Hawkins
- Succeeded by: Isaac H. Bronson
- Constituency: 20th district (1831–1833); 18th district (1833–1837)

Personal details
- Born: May 28, 1791 Bristol, Rhode Island, U.S.
- Died: March 27, 1878 (aged 86) Rome, New York, U.S.
- Resting place: Maplewood Cemetery, Mannsville, New York

Daniel Wardwell (May 28, 1791 – March 27, 1878) was an American lawyer, jurist, and politician who served three terms as a U.S. representative from New York from 1831 to 1837,

== Biography ==
Born in Bristol, Rhode Island, Wardwell graduated from Brown University, Providence, Rhode Island, in 1811. He studied law. He was admitted to the bar and commenced practice in Rome, New York.

He moved to Mannsville, New York, in 1814. He served as judge of the court of common pleas for Jefferson County, New York.

Wardwell was a member of the New York State Assembly in 1826, 1827, 1828 and 1838.

=== Congress ===
Wardwell was elected as a Jacksonian to the Twenty-second, Twenty-third, and Twenty-fourth Congresses (March 4, 1831 – March 3, 1837). He served as chairman of the Committee on Revolutionary Pensions (Twenty-third and Twenty-fourth Congresses).

=== Later career and death ===
He returned to Rome, New York, and resumed the practice of law.

He died in Rome, New York, March 27, 1878. He was interred in Maplewood Cemetery, Mannsville, New York.

== Sources ==
- United States Congress. "Daniel Wardwell (id: W000146)". Biographical Directory of the United States Congress.

U.S. House of Representatives
Preceded by Jonah Sanford, Joseph Hawkins	Member of the U.S. House of Representatives from New York's 20th congressional district 1831 – 1833 with Charles Dayan	Succeeded by Noadiah Johnson
Preceded by Nathaniel Pitcher	Member of the U.S. House of Representatives from New York's 18th congressional district 1833 – 1837	Succeeded by Isaac H. Bronson
