= Stephen B. Cushing =

American politician

Stephen Booth Cushing

New York State Attorney General
- In office January 1, 1856 – December 31, 1857
- Governor: Myron H. Clark; John Alsop King
- Preceded by: Ogden Hoffman
- Succeeded by: Lyman Tremain

Member of the New York State Assembly
- In office January 1, 1852 – December 31, 1852
- Preceded by: Ebenezer S. Marsh
- Succeeded by: Benjamin G. Ferris

Personal details
- Born: January 1812 Pawling, New York, U.S.
- Died: June 9, 1868 (aged 56) New York City, New York, U.S.
- Party: Democratic
- Spouse: Mary Woodcock (m. 1836)
- Parent(s): Milton Foster Cushing; Fanny Nicholas Cushing
- Education: Williams College
- Occupation: Lawyer, politician

Stephen Booth Cushing (January 1812 – June 9, 1868) was an American lawyer and politician.

== Early life ==
Cushing was born in Pawling in Dutchess County, New York in January 1812. He was the posthumous son of Milton Foster Cushing (1787–1811) and Frances "Fanny" (née Nicholas) Cushing (1788–1848) and grew up in Dover, New York.

He graduated from Williams College in 1832.

== Career ==
After studying law with David Woodcock, he was admitted to the bar in New York in 1835, and began practicing in Ithaca, New York. Shortly thereafter, he became law partners with former U.S. Representative Charles Humphrey, remaining so until Humphrey became clerk of the Supreme Court of New York in Albany. In 1843, he went into partnership with his brother-in-law, Benjamin G. Ferris, until he became Attorney General in 1855.

=== Political career ===
He was a Democratic member from Tompkins County of the New York State Assembly in the 75th New York State Legislature, serving from January 1 to December 31, 1852.

He was New York State Attorney General from 1856 to 1857, elected on the American Party ticket. While he was Attorney General, he was the prosecutor in the trial of Emma Cunningham for the murder of Dr. Harvey Burdell, a prosperous dentist in New York City in 1857. The case is considered one of the most famous cases in the American Victorian-era.

=== Later career ===
Afterwards he removed to New York City and practiced law there in partnership with Daniel E. Sickles, a former U.S. Representative who served as the United States Minister to Spain after Cushing's death. Sickles had gained notoriety in 1859, when he murdered his wife's lover, Philip Barton Key, son of Francis Scott Key, across the street from the White House.

== Personal life ==
In 1836, he married Mary Woodcock (c. 1815–1868), a daughter of Cushing's former law teacher, Democratic-Republican U.S. Representative from New York, David Woodcock. Mary's sister, Elizabeth Cornelia Woodcock, was married to Cushing's law partner, Benjamin G. Ferris. Together, Stephen and Mary were the parents of:

- Ferris Cushing (1840–1869), who served in the U.S. Civil War.
- Mary W. Cushing (1843–1911)
- Charles Humphrey Cushing (1847–1917), who became a member of the Producers' Petroleum exchange.

According to Cushing's Williams obituary, "there were few more popular orators in western New York, and as an after-dinner speaker he probably had no equal. Of a genial and enthusiastic nature few men ever enjoyed a wider degree of personal popularity."

Cushing died in New York City on June 9, 1868.

== Sources ==
New York State Assembly
Preceded by Ebenezer S. Marsh	New York State Assembly; Tompkins County, 2nd District; 1852	Succeeded by Benjamin G. Ferris
Legal offices
Preceded by Ogden Hoffman	New York State Attorney General; 1856–1857	Succeeded by Lyman Tremain
