= George Fisher (New York politician) =

American politician (1788–1861)

Member of the U.S. House of Representatives from New York's 20th district
- In office March 4, 1829 – February 5, 1830
- Preceded by: Silas Wright
- Succeeded by: Jonah Sanford

Personal details
- Born: March 17, 1788 Franklin, Massachusetts, U.S.
- Died: March 26, 1861 (aged 73) New York City, U.S.
- Party: Anti-Jacksonian
- Education: Brown University
- Occupation: Politician, lawyer

George Fisher (March 17, 1788 – March 26, 1861) was a U.S. representative from New York.

Born in Franklin, Massachusetts, Fisher attended the common schools and Brown University, Providence, Rhode Island. He studied law. He was admitted to the bar in Oswego County, New York, in 1816 and commenced practice in Oswego, New York. He was appointed inspector of schools in 1818. Trustee of the village of Oswego in 1828 and 1833.

Fisher was elected as an Anti-Jacksonian and presented credentials as a Member-elect to the Twenty-first Congress. He served from March 4, 1829, to February 5, 1830, when the seat was awarded to Silas Wright, Jr., who contested the election. The House committee that investigated found that 130 votes for Wright were mistakenly not counted for him. Fisher did not object to the conclusion or appear in his defense and formally resigned on March 9, 1830.

Fisher became the Trustee of schools in 1830 and continued the practice of law in Oswego, New York, until 1833. He and his family then moved to France for the education of his children, where he spent five years. He then returned to Oswego and engaged in real estate operations and served as president of the Northwestern Insurance Co. for several years. He moved to New York City about 1856 and died there March 26, 1861.

U.S. House of Representatives
Preceded by Silas Wright	Member of the U.S. House of Representatives from New York's 20th congressional district 1829-1830	Succeeded by Jonah Sanford
