= Charles Dayan =

American politician (1792–1877)

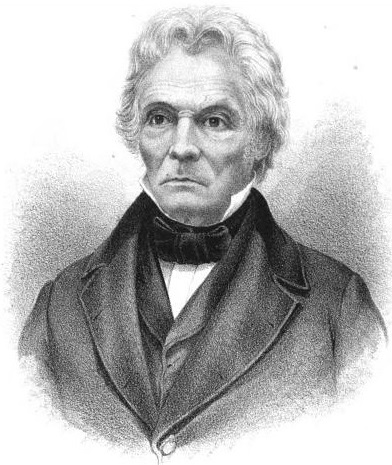

District attorney (Lewis Co.)
- In office 1840–1845

New York State Assembly (Lewis Co.)
- In office 1835–1836

Member of the U.S. House of Representatives from New York's 20th district
- In office March 4, 1831 – March 3, 1833
- Preceded by: Jonah Sanford; Joseph Hawkins
- Succeeded by: Noadiah Johnson

Acting Lieutenant Governor of New York
- In office October 17, 1828 – December 31, 1828
- Governor: Nathaniel Pitcher
- Preceded by: Peter R. Livingston (acting)
- Succeeded by: Enos T. Throop

New York State Senate (5th D.)
- In office 1827–1828

Personal details
- Born: July 8, 1792 Amsterdam, New York
- Died: December 25, 1877 (aged 85) Lowville, New York
- Resting place: Lowville Rural Cemetery
- Party: Jacksonian

Military service
- Allegiance: United States
- Branch/service: United States Army
- Rank: Lieutenant colonel
- Battles/wars: War of 1812

Charles Dayan (July 8, 1792 – December 25, 1877) was an American lawyer, politician, and veteran of the War of 1812. From 1831 to 1833, he served one term in the U.S. House of Representatives from the state of New York.

== Early life ==
After graduating from Lowville Academy, Dayan became a teacher.

=== War of 1812 ===
He was commissioned a lieutenant colonel in the War of 1812.

== Career ==
Afterwards he studied law, was admitted to the bar in 1817, and practiced in Lowville.

=== State politics ===
He was a member of the New York State Senate (5th D.) from 1827 to 1828, sitting in the 50th and 51st New York State Legislatures. He was President pro tempore of the State Senate and Acting Lieutenant Governor of New York from October 17 to December 31, 1828.

=== Presidential elector ===
Dayan was a presidential elector in 1828, voting for Andrew Jackson and John C. Calhoun.

=== Congress ===
He was elected as a Jacksonian to the 22nd United States Congress, holding office from March 4, 1831, to March 3, 1833.

== After Congress ==
He was a member of the New York State Assembly (Lewis Co.) in 1835 and 1836.

From 1840 to 1845, he was District Attorney of Lewis County.

He retired from public life because of ill health, but continued the practice of law.

== Death ==
He died on December 25, 1877, and was buried at Lowville Rural Cemetery.

== Sources ==
- United States Congress. "Charles Dayan (id: D000162)". Biographical Directory of the United States Congress.
- Political Graveyard

New York State Senate
Preceded by George Brayton	New York State Senate; Fifth District (Class 2); 1827–1828	Succeeded by William H. Maynard
Political offices
Preceded by Peter R. Livingston; Acting	Lieutenant Governor of New York; Acting; 1828	Succeeded by Enos T. Throop
U.S. House of Representatives
Preceded by Jonah Sanford, Joseph Hawkins	Member of the U.S. House of Representatives from New York's 20th congressional district 1831–1833 with Daniel Wardwell	Succeeded by Noadiah Johnson
New York State Assembly
Preceded by George D. Ruggles	New York State Assembly; Lewis Co. 1835–1836	Succeeded by George D. Ruggles
