= Ela Collins =

American politician

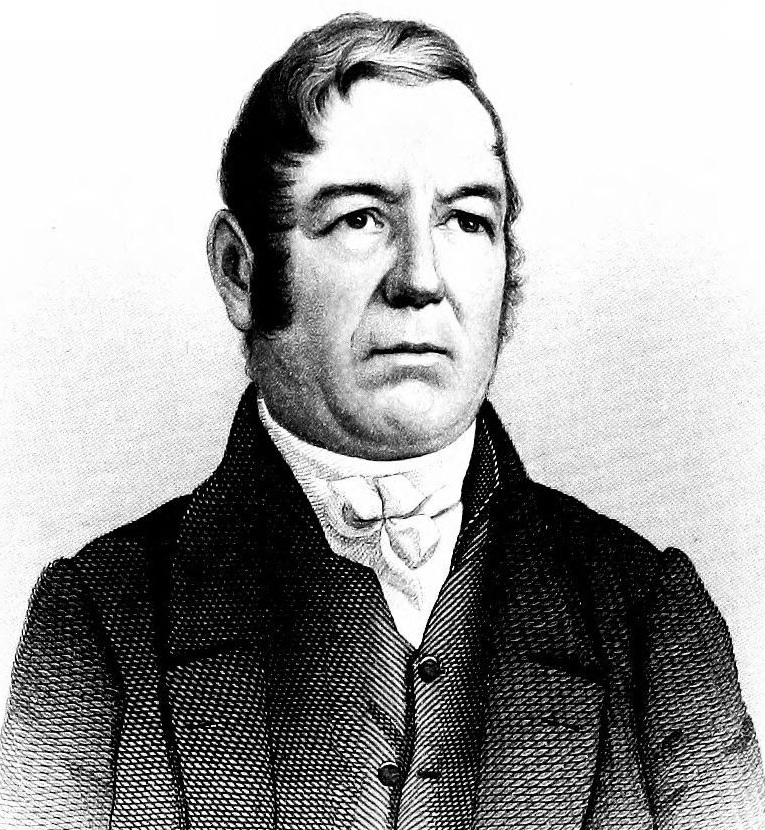

Member of the U.S. House of Representatives from New York's 20th district
- In office March 4, 1823 – March 3, 1825
- Preceded by: David Woodcock; William B. Rochester
- Succeeded by: Egbert Ten Eyck; Nicoll Fosdick

District attorney (8th District)
- In office 1815–1818

New York State Assembly
- In office 1814–1815

Personal details
- Born: February 14, 1786 Meriden, Connecticut, U.S.
- Died: November 23, 1848 (aged 62) Lowville, New York, U.S.
- Party: Crawford Democratic-Republican; Anti-Masonic
- Relatives: Helen Herron Taft (granddaughter)

Ela Collins (February 14, 1786 – November 23, 1848) was an American lawyer and politician from New York.

== Life ==
Collins was born on February 14, 1786, in Meriden, Connecticut, the son of Revolutionary War and War of 1812 militia veteran General Oliver Collins and Lois (née Cowles) Collins. He attended Clinton Academy, studied law, was admitted to the bar, and commenced practice in Lowville in 1807.

In 1808 he became an original Trustee of The Lowville Franklin Society, an association for creating and operating Lowville's first public library. Also in 1808, Collins sold a parcel of land on which was constructed the Lowville Academy, and he was an original Trustee of the school.

On July 11, 1811, he married Maria Clinton, daughter of Rev. Isaac Clinton. They had eleven children, among them Congressman William Collins, state legislator Isaac Clinton Collins, and Harriet Anne Collins Herron, the mother of First Lady Helen Herron Taft.

From 1811 to 1813 Collins was Lowville's Town Supervisor. He was a member of the New York State Assembly from 1814 to 1815. He was District Attorney of the Eighth District (comprising Lewis, Jefferson and St. Lawrence Counties from 1815 to 1818, and of Lewis County from 1818 to 1840. He was a delegate to the New York State Constitutional Convention of 1821.

Collins was elected as a Crawford Democratic-Republican to the 18th United States Congress, holding office from March 4, 1823, to March 3, 1825. The most significant matter considered by this Congress was the selection of the President of the United States. As no candidate -- John Quincy Adams, Henry Clay, Andrew Jackson or William H. Crawford had received a majority of electoral votes in the 1824 United States presidential election, the choice fell to the U.S. House. In the House, Clay was not considered, since he was the lowest finishing of the candidates. He threw his support to Adams.

The members voted individually by state caucus, with a majority of state delegations required to win. Collins favored Crawford. The New York delegation voted 18 for Adams, 2 for Jackson and 14 for Crawford. New York was counted for Adams, who won on the first ballot, with 13 states, followed by Jackson with 7 and Crawford with 4.

After his term in Congress Collins continued to practice law, and he later switched his political affiliation to the Anti-Masonic Party. Collins served again as Town Supervisor from 1827 to 1828 and 1829 to 1831. He was Chairman of the Lewis County Board of Supervisors in 1830. Collins also became active in the Lewis County Agricultural Society, and was active in several business ventures, including the Lewis County Mutual Insurance Company.

He died in Lowville on November 23, 1848, and was buried at the Jackson Street Cemetery in Lowville.

== Sources ==
- United States Congress. "Ela Collins (id: C000635)". Biographical Directory of the United States Congress.
- The New York Civil List compiled by Franklin Benjamin Hough (pp. 57, 71, 79, 189, 266, 368 and 375; Weed, Parsons and Co., 1858)
- Colins genealogy at RootsWeb

U.S. House of Representatives
Preceded by David Woodcock, William B. Rochester	Member of the U.S. House of Representatives from New York's 20th congressional district 1823–1825 with Egbert Ten Eyck	Succeeded by Egbert Ten Eyck, Nicoll Fosdick
