= Benjamin G. Ferris =

American politician

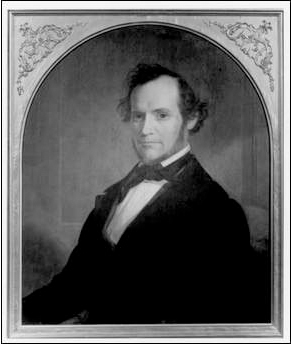
- Born: Benjamin Gilbert Ferris; 1802
- Died: February 21, 1891 (age 89)
- Occupations: Secretary to the Territorial Government of Utah; District attorney for Tompkins County, New York; Member of the New York State Assembly
- Notable work: Utah and the Mormons
- Spouse: Elizabeth Cornelia Woodcock

Benjamin Gilbert Ferris (1802 – February 21, 1891) was a Secretary to the Territorial Government of Utah, a lawyer, a district attorney and leader in Ithaca (town), New York.

== Biography ==
Ferris was born in 1802 in Spencer, New York, where his father was a prominent citizen. He received his secondary education in Spencer and Canandaigua. He studied law at Union College in Schenectady and graduated in 1828. He began practicing law in 1829 in the Ithaca, New York offices of David Woodcock, whose daughter Elizabeth Cornelia (1809–1903) he married in 1830.

He was District Attorney of Tompkins County, New York from 1840 to 1845. He was President of the Village of Ithaca in 1841 and 1852. He was a member of the New York State Assembly (Tompkins Co., 2nd D.) in 1851. He was Supervisor of the Town of Ithaca in 1855.

=== Mormon criticism ===
Ferris was appointed by President Millard Fillmore as Secretary of the Territory of Utah in 1852, replacing Broughton Harris. Ferris was a follower of Swedenborgianism and clashed with the Mormons during his six months in Utah. A biographer wrote: "He could not suppress his abhorence [sic] of Mormonism nor tolerate its influences, nor accept its devotees as his neighbors, and resigned his high position, thus sacrificing great possibilities in his very promising public career."

From his Utah experience, Ferris wrote the 1854 book Utah and the Mormons, and his wife published her letters from this period in the 1856 book The Mormons at Home. These books were influential in building opposition to Mormonism in the American public.

Ferris died in 1891 at the age of 89.

== Female Life Among the Mormons ==
Ferris or his wife were suspected to be the author of Female Life Among the Mormons: A Narrative of Many Years' Personal Experience under the penname "Maria Ward". Recent scholarship has shown that they were not the author.

== A New Theory of the Origin of Species ==
Ferris was the author of A New Theory of the Origin of Species (1872 and republished 1883). The book advocated an unorthodox form of creationism. Paleontologist Edward Drinker Cope negatively reviewed the book in The American Naturalist stating that "his theory, that each new specific form is produced from the matrix of a pre-existent species by supernatural power, is only a form of the old belief in distinct creations, and is not a developmental theory in any sense. He produces no evidence in support of it, in fact, he does not appear to know what scientific evidence is."

== Published works ==
- Ferris, Benjamin G. (1854). Utah and the Mormons: The History, Government, Doctrines, Customs, and Prospects of the Latter-Day Saints, from Personal Observation During a Six Months' Residence at Great Salt Lake City. Harper & Brothers.
- Ferris, Benjamin G. (1883). A New Theory of the Origin of Species. New York: Fowler & Wells.

New York State Assembly
Preceded by Elias W. Cady	New York State Assembly; Tompkins County, 2nd District; 1851	Succeeded by Stephen B. Cushing
