= New York's 20th congressional district =

U.S. House district for New York

- Interactive map of district boundaries since January 3, 2025
- Representative: Paul Tonko; D–Amsterdam
- Distribution: 88.69% urban; 11.31% rural
- Population (2025): 792,731
- Median household income: $91,043
- Ethnicity: 71.5% White; 9.2% Black; 7.1% Hispanic; 5.7% Asian; 5.2% Two or more races; 1.3% other
- Cook PVI: D+8

New York's 20th congressional district is a congressional district for the United States House of Representatives in New York's Capital District. It includes all of Albany and Schenectady counties, and portions of Montgomery, Rensselaer and Saratoga counties.

== Recent election results from statewide races ==
Year	Office	Results
2008	President	Obama 58–40%
2012	President	Obama 60–40%
2016	President	Clinton 53–41%
2016	Senate	Schumer 67–31%
2018	Senate	Gillibrand 62–38%
2018	Governor	Molinaro 47–46%
2018	Attorney General	James 55–42%
2020	President	Biden 58–39%
2022	Senate	Schumer 56–43%
2022	Governor	Hochul 53–47%
2022	Attorney General	James 55–45%
2022	Comptroller	DiNapoli 60–40%
2024	President	Harris 56–42%
2024	Senate	Gillibrand 60–40%

== History ==
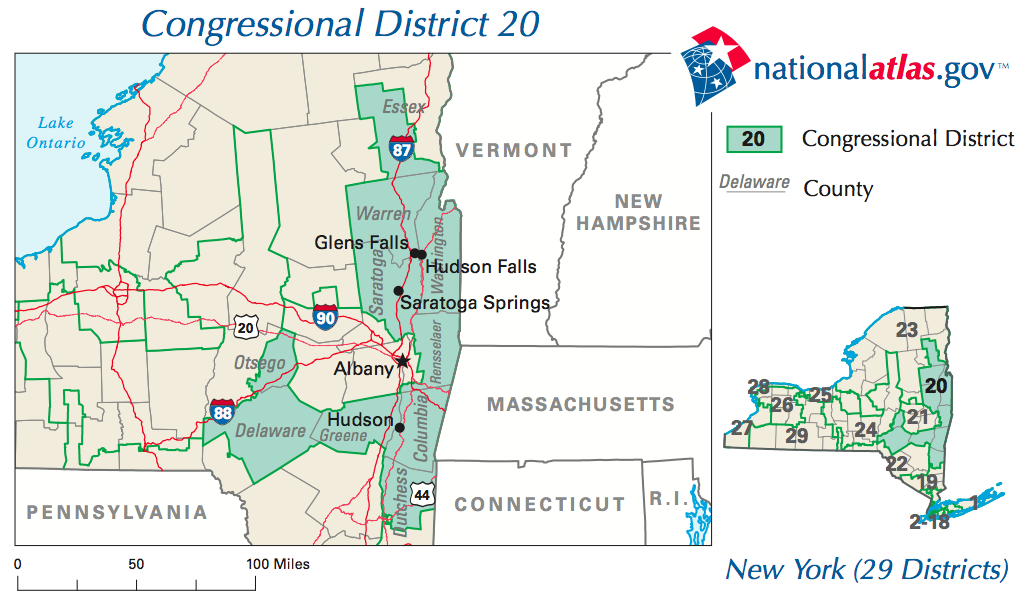
The district from 2003 to 2013

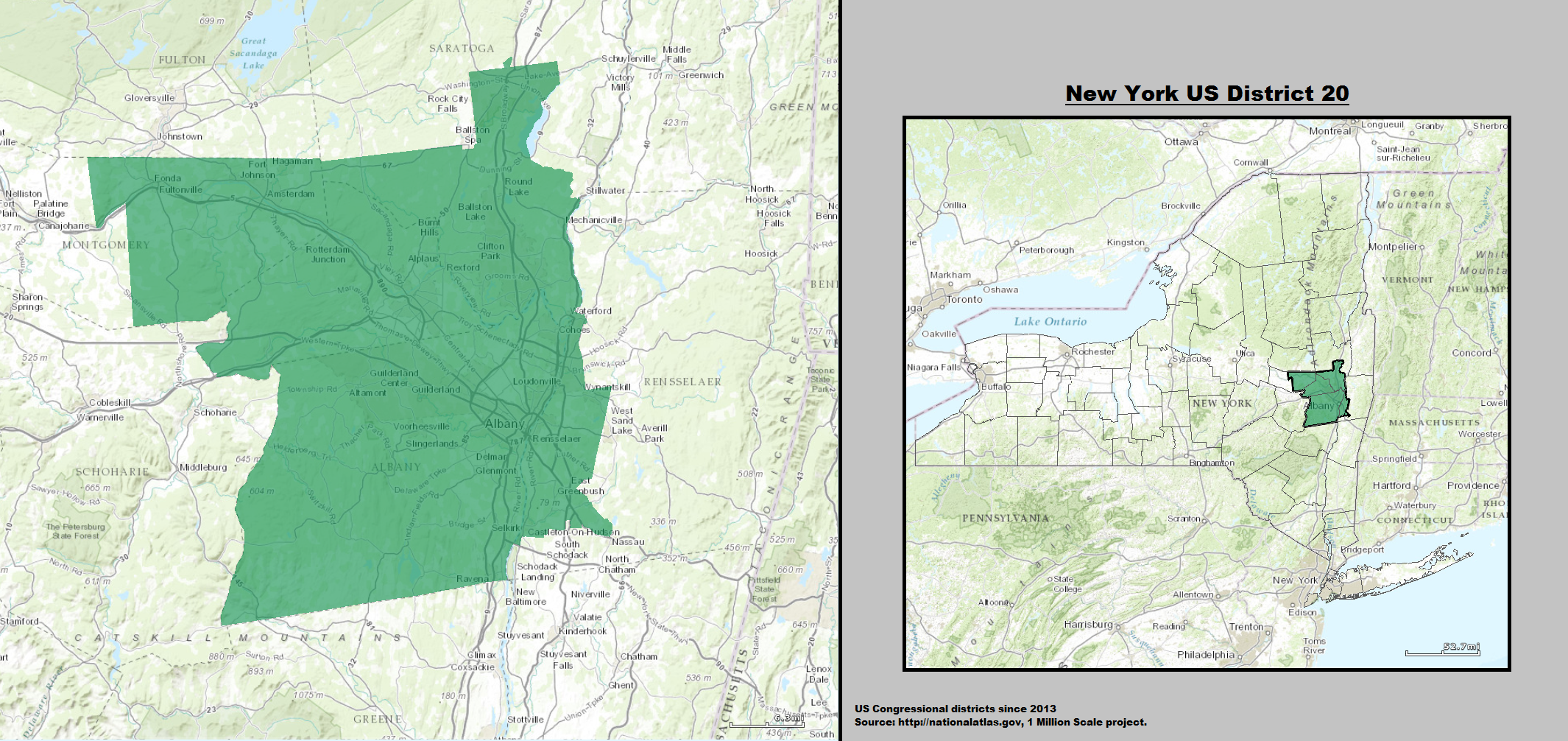
The district from 2013 to 2023

- 1825–?: (two seats) comprising St. Lawrence, Jefferson, Lewis and Oswego counties.
- 1875–1893: Montgomery
- 1913–1973: Parts of Manhattan
- 1973–1983: Parts of Bronx, Manhattan
- 1983–1993: Parts of Westchester
- 1993–2003: All of Rockland, Parts of Orange, Sullivan, Westchester
- 2003–2013: All of Columbia, Greene, Warren, Washington, Parts of Delaware, Dutchess, Essex, Otsego, Rensselaer, Saratoga
- 2013–2023: All of Albany, Schenectady, Parts of Montgomery, Rensselaer, Saratoga
- 2023–2025: All of Albany, Saratoga, Schenectady, Parts of Rensselaer
- 2025-present: All of Albany, Schenectady, Parts of Montgomery, Saratoga, Rensselaer

Various New York districts have been numbered "20" over the years, including areas in New York City and various parts of upstate New York.

== Counties, towns, and cities ==
For the 119th and successive Congresses (based on the districts drawn following the New York Court of Appeals' December 2023 decision in Hoffman v New York State Ind. Redistricting. Commn.), the district contains all or portions of the following counties, towns, and cities.

Albany County (13)

All 13 towns and cities

Montgomery County (3)

Amsterdam (city), Amsterdam (town), Florida

Rensselaer County (9)

Brunswick (part; also 19th), Hoosick, Hoosick Falls, North Greenbush, Pittstown, Rensselaer, Schaghticoke (town), Schaghticoke, Troy

Saratoga County (12)

Ballston, Charlton, Clifton Park, Galway, Halfmoon, Malta, Mechanicville, Milton, Saratoga Springs, Stillwater, Waterford, Wilton (part; also 21st)

Schenectady County (6)

All six towns and cities

== List of members representing the district ==
=== 1813–1833: two seats ===
From the creation of the district in 1813 to 1833, two seats were apportioned, elected at-large on a general ticket.

Years	Cong ress	Seat A			Seat B		
Years	Cong ress	Representative	Party	Electoral history	Representative	Party	Electoral history
March 4, 1813 – March 3, 1815	13th	Daniel Avery (Aurora)	Democratic-Republican	Redistricted from the 14th district and re-elected in 1812. [data missing]	Oliver C. Comstock (Trumansburg)	Democratic-Republican	Elected in 1812. Re-elected in 1814. Re-elected in 1816. [data missing]
March 4, 1815 – June 4, 1816	14th	Enos T. Throop (Auburn)	Democratic-Republican	Re-elected in 1814. Lost re-election and resigned early.	Oliver C. Comstock (Trumansburg)	Democratic-Republican	Elected in 1812. Re-elected in 1814. Re-elected in 1816. [data missing]
June 4, 1816 – September 30, 1816	14th	Vacant			Oliver C. Comstock (Trumansburg)	Democratic-Republican	Elected in 1812. Re-elected in 1814. Re-elected in 1816. [data missing]
September 30, 1816 – March 3, 1817	14th	Daniel Avery (Aurora)	Democratic-Republican	Elected in September 1816 to finish Throop's term and seated December 3, 1816. Retired.	Oliver C. Comstock (Trumansburg)	Democratic-Republican	Elected in 1812. Re-elected in 1814. Re-elected in 1816. [data missing]
March 4, 1817 – March 3, 1819	15th	Daniel Cruger (Bath)	Democratic-Republican	Elected in 1816. [data missing]	Oliver C. Comstock (Trumansburg)	Democratic-Republican	Elected in 1812. Re-elected in 1814. Re-elected in 1816. [data missing]
March 4, 1819 – March 3, 1821	16th	Caleb Baker (Elmira)	Democratic-Republican	Elected in 1818. [data missing]	Jonathan Richmond (Aurora)	Democratic-Republican	Elected in 1818. Lost re-election.
March 4, 1821 – December 3, 1821	17th	Vacant		Elections were held in April 1821. It is unclear when results were announced or credentials issued.	Vacant		Elections were held in April 1821. It is unclear when results were announced or credentials issued.
December 3, 1821 – March 3, 1823	17th	William B. Rochester (Bath)	Democratic-Republican	Elected in 1821. Redistricted to the 28th district.	David Woodcock (Ithaca)	Democratic-Republican	Elected in 1821. Resigned to become judge of the Eight Circuit Court
March 4, 1823 – March 3, 1825	18th	Ela Collins (Lowville)	Democratic-Republican	Elected in 1822. [data missing]	Egbert Ten Eyck (Watertown)	Democratic-Republican	Elected in 1822. Re-elected in 1824. Lost election contest.
March 4, 1825 – December 15, 1825	19th	Nicoll Fosdick (Morristown)	Anti-Jacksonian	Elected in 1824. Lost re-election.	Egbert Ten Eyck (Watertown)	Jacksonian	Elected in 1822. Re-elected in 1824. Lost election contest.
December 15, 1825 – March 3, 1827	19th	Nicoll Fosdick (Morristown)	Anti-Jacksonian	Elected in 1824. Lost re-election.	Daniel Hugunin Jr. (Oswego)	Anti-Jacksonian	Successfully contested election of Egbert Ten Eyck.
March 4, 1827 – February 16, 1829	20th	Rudolph Bunner (Oswego)	Jacksonian	Elected in 1826. Retired.	Silas Wright (Canton)	Jacksonian	Elected in 1826. Lost re-election then resigned.
February 16, 1829 – March 3, 1829	20th	Rudolph Bunner (Oswego)	Jacksonian	Elected in 1826. Retired.	Vacant		
March 4, 1829 – February 5, 1830	21st	Joseph Hawkins (Henderson)	Anti-Jacksonian	Elected in 1828. [data missing]	George Fisher (Oswego)	Anti-Jacksonian	Elected in 1828. Election successfully contested by Silas Wright, but declined to qualify
February 5, 1830 – November 3, 1830	21st	Joseph Hawkins (Henderson)	Anti-Jacksonian	Elected in 1828. [data missing]	Vacant		
November 3, 1830 – March 3, 1831	21st	Joseph Hawkins (Henderson)	Anti-Jacksonian	Elected in 1828. [data missing]	Jonah Sanford (Oswego)	Jacksonian	Elected to finish Fisher/Wright's term. Retired.
March 4, 1831 – March 3, 1833	22nd	Charles Dayan (Lowville)	Jacksonian	Elected in 1830. [data missing]	Daniel Wardwell (Mannsville)	Jacksonian	Elected in 1830. Redistricted to the 18th district.

=== 1833–present: one seat ===
Representative	Party	Years	Cong ress	Electoral history	District location
Noadiah Johnson (Delhi)	Jacksonian	March 4, 1833 – March 3, 1835	23rd	Elected in 1832. [data missing]	
William Seymour (Binghamton)	Jacksonian	March 4, 1835 – March 3, 1837	24th	Elected in 1834. [data missing]	
Amasa J. Parker (Delhi)	Democratic	March 4, 1837 – March 3, 1839	25th	Elected in 1836. Retired.	
Judson Allen (Harpursville)	Democratic	March 4, 1839 – March 3, 1841	26th	Elected in 1838. [data missing]	
Samuel Gordon (Delhi)	Democratic	March 4, 1841 – March 3, 1843	27th	Elected in 1840. [data missing]	
Samuel Beardsley (Utica)	Democratic	March 4, 1843 – February 29, 1844	28th	Elected in 1842. Resigned.	
Vacant		February 29, 1844 – November 5, 1844	28th		
Levi D. Carpenter (Waterville)	Democratic	November 5, 1844 – March 3, 1845	28th	Elected to finish Beardsley's term. [data missing]	
Timothy Jenkins (Oneida Castle)	Democratic	March 4, 1845 – March 3, 1849	29th 30th	Elected in 1844. Re-elected in 1846. [data missing]	
Orsamus B. Matteson (Utica)	Whig	March 4, 1849 – March 3, 1851	31st	Elected in 1848. [data missing]	
Timothy Jenkins (Oneida Castle)	Democratic	March 4, 1851 – March 3, 1853	32nd	Elected in 1850. [data missing]	
Orsamus B. Matteson (Utica)	Whig	March 4, 1853 – March 3, 1855	33rd 34th	Elected in 1852. Re-elected in 1854. Resigned just before a recommendation of censure could be passed by the House for allegations of bribery and corruption concerning a Minnesota land bill. He was also accused of publicly stating that a majority of the US House was purchasable.	
Orsamus B. Matteson (Utica)	Opposition	March 4, 1855 – February 27, 1857	33rd 34th	Elected in 1852. Re-elected in 1854. Resigned just before a recommendation of censure could be passed by the House for allegations of bribery and corruption concerning a Minnesota land bill. He was also accused of publicly stating that a majority of the US House was purchasable.	
Vacant		February 27, 1857 – March 3, 1857	34th		
Orsamus B. Matteson (Utica)	Republican	March 4, 1857 – March 3, 1859	35th	Elected in 1856. [data missing]	
Roscoe Conkling (Utica)	Republican	March 4, 1859 – March 3, 1863	36th 37th	Elected in 1858. Re-elected in 1860. Redistricted to the 21st district and lost re-election.	
Ambrose W. Clark (Watertown)	Republican	March 4, 1863 – March 3, 1865	38th	Redistricted from the 23rd district and re-elected in 1862. [data missing]	
Addison H. Laflin (Herkimer)	Republican	March 4, 1865 – March 3, 1871	39th 40th 41st	Elected in 1864. Re-elected in 1866. Re-elected in 1868. [data missing]	
Clinton L. Merriam (Locust Grove)	Republican	March 4, 1871 – March 3, 1873	42nd	Elected in 1870. Redistricted to the 21st district.	
David Wilber (Milford)	Republican	March 4, 1873 – March 3, 1875	43rd	Elected in 1872. [data missing]	
Henry H. Hathorn (Saratoga Springs)	Republican	March 4, 1875 – March 3, 1877	44th	Redistricted from the 19th district and re-elected in 1874. [data missing]	
John H. Starin (Fultonville)	Republican	March 4, 1877 – March 3, 1881	45th 46th	Elected in 1876. Re-elected in 1878. [data missing]	
George West (Ballston Spa)	Republican	March 4, 1881 – March 3, 1883	47th	Elected in 1880. [data missing]	
Edward Wemple (Fultonville)	Democratic	March 4, 1883 – March 3, 1885	48th	Elected in 1882. [data missing]	
George West (Ballston Spa)	Republican	March 4, 1885 – March 3, 1889	49th 50th	Elected in 1884. Re-elected in 1886. [data missing]	
John Sanford (Amsterdam)	Republican	March 4, 1889 – March 3, 1893	51st 52nd	Elected in 1888. Re-elected in 1890. [data missing]	
Charles Tracey (Albany)	Democratic	March 4, 1893 – March 3, 1895	53rd	Redistricted from the 19th district and re-elected in 1892. [data missing]	
George N. Southwick (Albany)	Republican	March 4, 1895 – March 3, 1899	54th 55th	Elected in 1894. Re-elected in 1896. [data missing]	
Martin H. Glynn (Albany)	Democratic	March 4, 1899 – March 3, 1901	56th	Elected in 1898. [data missing]	
George N. Southwick (Albany)	Republican	March 4, 1901 – March 3, 1903	57th	Elected in 1900. Redistricted to the 23rd district.	
Thomas W. Bradley (Walden)	Republican	March 4, 1903 – March 3, 1913	58th 59th 60th 61st 62nd	Elected in 1902. Re-elected in 1904. Re-elected in 1906. Re-elected in 1908. Re-elected in 1910. [data missing]	
Francis B. Harrison (New York)	Democratic	March 4, 1913 – September 3, 1913	63rd	Elected in 1912. Resigned to become chief executive of the Philippines	
Vacant		September 3, 1913 – November 4, 1913	63rd		
Jacob A. Cantor (New York)	Democratic	November 4, 1913 – March 3, 1915	63rd	Elected to finish Harrison's term. [data missing]	
Isaac Siegel (New York)	Republican	March 4, 1915 – March 3, 1923	64th 65th 66th 67th	Elected in 1914. Re-elected in 1916. Re-elected in 1918. Re-elected in 1920. [data missing]	
Fiorello H. LaGuardia (New York)	Republican	March 4, 1923 – March 3, 1925	68th 69th 70th 71st 72nd	Elected in 1922. Re-elected in 1924. (Note: In 1924, La Guardia ran for re-election on the Socialist line after refusing the Republican nomination in order to endorse Robert M. LaFollette's presidential campaign.); Re-elected in 1926. Re-elected in 1928. Re-elected in 1930. [data missing]	
Fiorello H. LaGuardia (New York)	Socialist	March 4, 1925 – March 3, 1927	68th 69th 70th 71st 72nd	Elected in 1922. Re-elected in 1924. Re-elected in 1926. Re-elected in 1928. Re-elected in 1930. [data missing]	
Fiorello H. LaGuardia (New York)	Republican	March 4, 1927 – March 3, 1933	68th 69th 70th 71st 72nd	Elected in 1922. Re-elected in 1924. Re-elected in 1926. Re-elected in 1928. Re-elected in 1930. [data missing]	
James J. Lanzetta (New York)	Democratic	March 4, 1933 – January 3, 1935	73rd	Elected in 1932. [data missing]	
Vito Marcantonio (New York)	Republican	January 3, 1935 – January 3, 1937	74th	Elected in 1934. [data missing]	
James J. Lanzetta (New York)	Democratic	January 3, 1937 – January 3, 1939	75th	Elected in 1936. [data missing]	
Vito Marcantonio (New York)	American Labor	January 3, 1939 – January 3, 1945	76th 77th 78th	Elected in 1938. Re-elected in 1940. Re-elected in 1942. Redistricted to the 18th district.	
Sol Bloom (New York)	Democratic	January 3, 1945 – March 7, 1949	79th 80th 81st	Redistricted from the 19th district and re-elected in 1944. Re-elected in 1946. Re-elected in 1948. Died.	
Vacant		March 8, 1949 – May 16, 1949	81st		
Franklin D. Roosevelt Jr. (New York)	Liberal	May 17, 1949 – January 3, 1951	81st 82nd 83rd	Elected to finish Bloom's term. Re-elected in 1950. Re-elected in 1952. [data missing]	
Franklin D. Roosevelt Jr. (New York)	Democratic	January 3, 1951 – January 3, 1955	81st 82nd 83rd	Elected to finish Bloom's term. Re-elected in 1950. Re-elected in 1952. [data missing]	
Irwin D. Davidson (New York)	Democratic-Liberal	January 3, 1955 – December 31, 1956	84th	Elected in 1954. Resigned after being elected judge of Court of General Sessions for New York County	
Vacant		January 1, 1957 – January 2, 1957	84th		
Ludwig Teller (New York)	Democratic	January 3, 1957 – January 3, 1961	85th 86th	Elected in 1956. Re-elected in 1958. [data missing]	
William Fitts Ryan (New York)	Democratic	January 3, 1961 – September 17, 1972	87th 88th 89th 90th 91st 92nd	Elected in 1960. Re-elected in 1962. Re-elected in 1964. Re-elected in 1966. Re-elected in 1968. Re-elected in 1970. Died.	
Vacant		September 18, 1972 – January 2, 1973	92nd		
Bella Abzug (New York)	Democratic	January 3, 1973 – January 3, 1977	93rd 94th	Redistricted from the 19th district and re-elected in 1972. Re-elected in 1974. [data missing]	
Ted Weiss (New York)	Democratic	January 3, 1977 – January 3, 1983	95th 96th 97th	Elected in 1976. Re-elected in 1978. Re-elected in 1980. Redistricted to the 17th district.	
Richard Ottinger (Mamaroneck)	Democratic	January 3, 1983 – January 3, 1985	98th	Redistricted from the 24th district and re-elected in 1982. [data missing]	
Joe DioGuardi (Scarsdale)	Republican	January 3, 1985 – January 3, 1989	99th 100th	Elected in 1984. Re-elected in 1986. [data missing]	
Nita Lowey (New York)	Democratic	January 3, 1989 – January 3, 1993	101st 102nd	Elected in 1988. Re-elected in 1990. Redistricted to the 18th district.	
Benjamin Gilman (Middletown)	Republican	January 3, 1993 – January 3, 2003	103rd 104th 105th 106th 107th	Redistricted from the 22nd district and re-elected in 1992. Re-elected in 1994. Re-elected in 1996. Re-elected in 1998. Re-elected in 2000. Retired.	
John E. Sweeney (Clifton Park)	Republican	January 3, 2003 – January 3, 2007	108th 109th	Redistricted from the 22nd district and re-elected in 2002. Re-elected in 2004. Lost re-election.	2003–2013
Kirsten Gillibrand (Greenport)	Democratic	January 3, 2007 – January 26, 2009	110th 111th	Elected in 2006. Re-elected in 2008. Resigned when appointed U.S. senator.	2003–2013
Vacant		January 27, 2009 – March 31, 2009	111th		2003–2013
Scott Murphy (Glens Falls)	Democratic	March 31, 2009 – January 3, 2011	111th	Elected to finish Gillibrand's term. Lost re-election.	2003–2013
Chris Gibson (Kinderhook)	Republican	January 3, 2011 – January 3, 2013	112th	Elected in 2010. Redistricted to the 19th district.	2003–2013
Paul Tonko (Amsterdam)	Democratic	January 3, 2013 – present	113th 114th 115th 116th 117th 118th 119th	Redistricted from the 21st district and re-elected in 2012. Re-elected in 2014. Re-elected in 2016. Re-elected in 2018. Re-elected in 2020. Re-elected in 2022. Re-elected in 2024. Re-elected in 2026.	2013–2023
Paul Tonko (Amsterdam)	Democratic	January 3, 2013 – present	113th 114th 115th 116th 117th 118th 119th	Redistricted from the 21st district and re-elected in 2012. Re-elected in 2014. Re-elected in 2016. Re-elected in 2018. Re-elected in 2020. Re-elected in 2022. Re-elected in 2024. Re-elected in 2026.	2023–2025
Paul Tonko (Amsterdam)	Democratic	January 3, 2013 – present	113th 114th 115th 116th 117th 118th 119th	Redistricted from the 21st district and re-elected in 2012. Re-elected in 2014. Re-elected in 2016. Re-elected in 2018. Re-elected in 2020. Re-elected in 2022. Re-elected in 2024. Re-elected in 2026.	2025–present

== Election results ==
In New York State electoral politics there are numerous minor parties at various points on the political spectrum. Certain parties will invariably endorse either the Republican or Democratic candidate for every office, hence the state electoral results contain both the party votes, and the final candidate votes (Listed as "Recap").

1996 United States House of Representatives elections in New York's 20th district
Party	Candidate	Votes	%	±%
Republican	Benjamin A. Gilman (incumbent)	122,479	57.1%	
Democratic	Yash A. Aggarwal	80,761	37.6%	
Right to Life	Robert F. Garrison	6,356	3.0%	
Independence	Ira W. Goodman	5,016	2.3%	
Majority		41,718	19.4%	
Turnout		214,612	100%	

1998 United States House of Representatives elections in New York's 20th district
Party	Candidate	Votes	%	±%
Republican	Benjamin A. Gilman (incumbent)	98,546	58.3%	+1.2%
Democratic	Paul J. Feiner	65,589	38.8%	+1.2%
Right to Life	Christine M. Tighe	4,769	2.8%	−0.2%
Majority		32,957	19.5%	+0.1%
Turnout		168,904	100%	−21.3%

2000 United States House of Representatives elections in New York's 20th district
Party	Candidate	Votes	%	±%
Republican	Benjamin A. Gilman (incumbent)	136,016	57.6%	−0.7%
Democratic	Paul J. Feiner	94,646	40.1%	+1.3%
Right to Life	Christine M. Tighe	5,371	2.3%	−0.5%
Majority		41,370	17.5%	−2.0%
Turnout		236,033	100%	+39.7%

2002 United States House of Representatives elections in New York's 20th district
Party	Candidate	Votes	%	±%
Republican	John E. Sweeney	140,238	73.3%	+15.7%
Democratic	Frank Stoppenbach	45,878	24.0%	−16.1%
Green	Margaret Lewis	5,162	2.7%	+2.7%
Majority		94,360	49.3%	+31.8%
Turnout		191,278	100%	−19.0%

2004 United States House of Representatives elections in New York's 20th district
Party	Candidate	Votes	%	±%
Republican	John E. Sweeney (incumbent)	188,753	65.8%	−7.5%
Democratic	Doris F. Kelly	96,630	33.7%	+9.7%
Centrist Party	Morris N. Guller	1,353	0.5%	+0.5%
Majority		92,123	32.1%	−17.2%
Turnout		286,736	100%	+49.9%

2006 United States House of Representatives elections in New York's 20th district
Party	Candidate	Votes	%	±%
Democratic	Kirsten Gillibrand	125,168	53.1%	+19.4%
Republican	John E. Sweeney (incumbent)	110,554	46.9%	−18.9%
Majority		14,614	6.2%	−25.9%
Turnout		235,722	100%	−17.8%

2008 United States House of Representatives elections in New York's 20th district
Party	Candidate	Votes	%	±%
Democratic	Kirsten Gillibrand (incumbent)	177,677	61.8%	+8.7%
Republican	Sandy Treadwell	109,644	38.2%	−8.7%
Majority		68,033	23.6%	+17.4%
Turnout		287,321	100%	+21.9%

2009 New York's 20th congressional district special election
Party	Candidate	Votes	%	±%
Democratic	Scott Murphy	80,833	50.23%	−11.57%
Republican	James Tedisco	80,107	49.77%	+11.57%
Majority		726	0.45%	−23.15%
Turnout		160,940	100%	−44.0%

2010 United States House of Representatives elections in New York's 20th district
Party	Candidate	Votes	%	±%
Republican	Chris Gibson	130,176	54.87%	+5.10%
Democratic	Scott Murphy (incumbent)	107,077	45.13%	−5.10%
Majority		23,099	9.74%	+9.29%
Turnout		237,253	100%	+47.4%

2012 United States House of Representatives elections in New York's 20th district
Party	Candidate	Votes	%	±%
Democratic	Paul Tonko	203,401	68.44%	+23.3%
Republican	Robert J. Dieterich	93,778	31.56%	−23.3%
Majority		109,623	36.89%	+27.2%
Turnout		313,024	100%	+31.93%

2014 United States House of Representatives elections in New York's 20th district
Party	Candidate	Votes	%	±%
Democratic	Paul Tonko (incumbent)	125,111	61.26%	−7.18%
Republican	James M. Fischer	79,104	38.74%	+7.18%
Majority		46007	22.53%	−14.36%
Turnout		171,118	100%	−45.33%

2016 United States House of Representatives elections in New York's 20th district
Party	Candidate	Votes	%	±%
Democratic	Paul Tonko (incumbent)	213,018	67.89%	+6.63%
Republican	Joe Vitollo	100,740	32.11%	−6.63%
Majority		112,278	35.78%	+13.25%
Turnout		325,296	100%	+90.10%

2018 United States House of Representatives elections in New York's 20th district
Party	Candidate	Votes	%	±%
Democratic	Paul Tonko (incumbent)	176,811	66.50%	−1.39%
Republican	Joe Vitollo	89,058	33.50%	+1.39%
Majority		87,753	33.01%	−2.77%
Turnout		264,564	100%	−18.67%

2022 United States House of Representatives elections in New York's 20th district
Party	Candidate	Votes	%
Democratic	Paul Tonko	194,071	54.0
Working Families	Paul Tonko	19,678	5.5
Independence	Paul Tonko	5,956	1.7
Total	Paul Tonko (incumbent)	219,705	61.2
Republican	Liz Joy	120,839	33.6
Conservative	Liz Joy	17,849	5.0
SAM	Liz Joy	758	0.2
Total	Liz Joy	139,446	38.8
Total votes		359,151	100.0
Democratic hold			

2024 United States House of Representatives elections in New York's 20th district
Party	Candidate	Votes	%
Democratic	Paul Tonko	200,354	55.2
Working Families	Paul Tonko	21,643	5.9
Total	Paul Tonko (incumbent)	221,997	61.1
Republican	Kevin Waltz	121,609	33.5
Conservative	Kevin Waltz	19,542	5.4
Total	Kevin Waltz	141,151	38.9
Total votes		363,148	100.0
Democratic hold			

== See also ==
- List of United States congressional districts
- New York's congressional delegations
- New York's congressional districts
