= Daniel Hugunin Jr. =

American politician

Member of the U.S. House of Representatives from New York's 20th district
- In office December 15, 1825 – March 3, 1827 Serving with Nicoll Fosdick
- Preceded by: Egbert Ten Eyck; Nicoll Fosdick
- Succeeded by: Silas Wright Jr.; Rudolph Bunner

United States Marshal for the Wisconsin Territory
- In office March 15, 1841 – August 31, 1844
- Appointed by: William Henry Harrison
- Succeeded by: Charles M. Prevost

Personal details
- Born: February 6, 1790 Oswego, New York, U.S.
- Died: June 20, 1850 (aged 60) Kenosha, Wisconsin, U.S.
- Resting place: Green Ridge Cemetery, Kenosha, Wisconsin, U.S.
- Party: National Republican

Daniel Hugunin Jr. (February 6, 1790 – June 20, 1850) was an American politician from New York and Wisconsin Territory.

== Life ==
He was the son of Daniel Abraham Hugunin (1756–1828) and Mary (Garrabrance) Hugunin. He pursued classical studies. He served as a lieutenant in the War of 1812 and was taken prisoner at the Battle of Queenston Heights. On January 4, 1817, he married Clarissa Ann Van Horne at Schenectady, and they had five children, among them Daniel Clinton Huguenin (1825–1846), who died in the Mexican–American War.

At the United States House of Representatives elections in New York, 1824, Hugunin received a majority of the votes cast in the 20th congressional district, but while the greater part of the votes was returned for "Daniel Hugunin, jun.", a smaller part was returned for "Daniel Hugunin, junior" and "Daniel Hugunin". The votes for the latter two variants were counted as scattering, giving a plurality to Egbert Ten Eyck, the incumbent Jacksonian congressman. Hugunin contested the election of Ten Eyck, and was seated as an Adams man in the 19th United States Congress on December 15, 1825, holding office until March 3, 1827.

In 1828, Hugunin was elected one of the first trustees of the Village of Oswego.

On March 15, 1841, he was appointed by President William Henry Harrison as United States Marshal for Wisconsin Territory. He remained in office until August 31, 1844, when Charles M. Prevost was appointed to succeed Hugunin.

Hugunin later served as the harbor master at Kenosha. He died of a stroke on June 20, 1850 and was buried at Green Ridge Cemetery in Kenosha.

== Sources ==
- United States Congress. "Daniel Hugunin Jr. (id: H000932)". Biographical Directory of the United States Congress. [gives wrong death date]
- Dictionary of the United States Congress and the General Government by Charles Lanman (Hartford, 1869; page 200)
- Cases of Contested Elections in Congress 1789 to 1834 compiled by Matthew St. Clair Clarke and David A. Hall (Washington, D.C., 1834; Case LIII, pages 501ff)
- Hugunin genealogy at Family Tree Maker

U.S. House of Representatives
Preceded by Egbert Ten Eyck, Nicoll Fosdick	Member of the U.S. House of Representatives from New York's 20th congressional district 1825–1827 with Nicoll Fosdick	Succeeded by Silas Wright Jr., Rudolph Bunner
