= Joseph Hawkins (New York politician) =

American politician (1781–1832)

Member of the U.S. House of Representatives from New York's 20th district
- In office March 4, 1829 – March 3, 1831
- Preceded by: Rudolph Bunner
- Succeeded by: Charles Dayan

Personal details
- Born: November 14, 1781
- Died: April 20, 1832 (aged 50) Henderson, New York, U.S.
- Resting place: Clark Cemetery
- Party: Anti-Jacksonian
- Occupation: Politician, lawyer, judge

Joseph Hawkins (November 14, 1781 – April 20, 1832) was a United States representative from Upstate New York.

A native of Connecticut, Hawkins moved to Henderson, New York in 1810. He completed preparatory studies, studied law, was admitted to the bar and commenced practice in Henderson. He also engaged in agricultural pursuits. He served as county judge for many years. Hawkins was elected as an Anti-Jacksonian to the Twenty-first Congress (March 4, 1829 – March 3, 1831). He died in Henderson on April 20, 1832, with interment in Clark Cemetery.

U.S. House of Representatives
Preceded by Rudolph Bunner	Member of the U.S. House of Representatives from New York's 20th congressional district 1829-1831	Succeeded by Charles Dayan
