= Egbert Ten Eyck =

American politician (1779–1844)

Member of the U.S. House of Representatives
- In office March 4, 1823 – December 15, 1825
- Preceded by: David Woodcock; William B. Rochester
- Succeeded by: Daniel Hugunin, Jr. Nicoll Fosdick

Member of the New York State Assembly
- In office July 1, 1812 – June 30, 1813

Personal details
- Born: April 18, 1779 Schodack, New York
- Died: April 11, 1844 (aged 64) Watertown, New York
- Party: Federalist; Jacksonian
- Spouse: Rebecca Pearce (m. 1810)
- Relations: Joseph Mullin (grandson)
- Parent(s): Anthony E. Ten Eyck; Maria Egbert
- Education: Williams College (1799)

Egbert Ten Eyck (April 18, 1779 in Schodack, Rensselaer County, New York – April 11, 1844 in Watertown, Jefferson County, New York) was an American lawyer and politician from New York. In the mid-1820s, he served parts of two terms in the U.S. House of Representatives.

== Early life ==
Ten Eyck was born on April 18, 1779, in Schodack, New York. He was the son of Anthony E. Ten Eyck (1739–1816) and Maria (née Egbert) Ten Eyck (1748–1819). His father was a member of Constitutional Convention of 1787, judge of Rensselaer County and member of the New York State Senate. He had several siblings including Anthony Ten Eyck (1784–1859), Jacob A. Ten Eyck (1781–1859), Coenraad Anthony Ten Eyck (1789–1845), Sheriff of Albany County.

His paternal grandparents were Catharine (nee Cuyler) Ten Eyck (1709–1790) and Jacob Coenraedt Ten Eyck (1705–1793), who served as Mayor of Albany from 1748 to 1750 and was a member of Albany’s Committee of Safety during the Revolutionary War.

He graduated from Williams College in 1799. Then he studied law at Albany, New York, was admitted to the bar in 1807, and practiced in Watertown.

== Career ==
In June 1812, Ten Eyck was elected as a Federalist to the New York State Assembly representing Jefferson County, serving from July 1, 1812 until June 30, 1813.

He was Supervisor of Jefferson County in 1816, Trustee of the Village of Watertown in 1816, and one of the incorporators of the Jefferson County National Bank. He was First Secretary of the Jefferson County Agricultural Society in 1817, President of the Village of Watertown in 1820, and was a delegate to the New York State Constitutional Convention of 1821. He was First Judge of the Jefferson County Court, serving from 1820 to 1829.

In November 1824, Ten Eyck was elected to the 18th, and declared re-elected as a Jacksonian to the 19th United States Congress, holding office from March 4, 1823, to December 15, 1825, when his election was successfully contested by Daniel Hugunin, Jr. The House unseated Ten Eyck and seated Hugunin, because a correction of the returns showed that the omission of the word ‘‘junior’’ in certain returns had deprived Hugunin of enough votes actually cast for him to secure his election.

Afterwards Ten Eyck resumed the practice of law.

== Personal life ==
He married Rebecca Pearce (1788–1850), the daughter of Pierce and Lydia Pierce. Her brother was Olney Pierce (1770–1839), who married Elizabeth Van Deusen, and her sister was Lydia Pierce (1777–1839), who married Elias Ticknor (1769–1843). Olney and Egbert were both early settlers of Champion, New York. Together, they were the parents of:

- Anthony Ten Eyck (1811–1867), who married Harriet Elizabeth Fairchild (1815–1846), daughter of Rev. Joy Hamlet Fairchild, in 1836.
- Catherine Ten Eyck (1813–1863), who married Jacob Foster in 1836.
- Lydia Maria Ten Eyck (1815–1884), who married Joseph Mullin (1811–1882), also a lawyer and member of the U.S. House of Representatives in 1839.
- Egbert Ten Eyck (1828–1878)
- Robert Ten Eyck (1832–1873), who married Catharine Greene.

He died on April 11, 1844, the same day as Micah Sterling who had preceded him in Congress, and both were buried at the Brookside Cemetery in Watertown.

=== Descendants ===
Through his daughter Lydia, he was the maternal grandfather of State Senator Joseph Mullin (1848–1897).

== See also ==
- Ten Eyck family

U.S. House of Representatives
Preceded by David Woodcock, William B. Rochester	Member of the U.S. House of Representatives from New York's 20th congressional district 1823–1825 with Ela Collins 1823-25 and Nicoll Fosdick 1825	Succeeded by Daniel Hugunin, Jr., Nicoll Fosdick
