= Nicoll Fosdick =

American politician

Member of the U.S. House of Representatives from New York's 20th district
- In office March 4, 1825 – March 3, 1827 Serving with: Egbert Ten Eyck 1825; Daniel Hugunin, Jr. 1825-1827
- Preceded by: Egbert Ten Eyck; Ela Collins
- Succeeded by: Silas Wright, Jr.; Rudolph Bunner

Personal details
- Born: November 9, 1785 New London, Connecticut, U.S.
- Died: May 7, 1868 (aged 82) New London, Connecticut, U.S.
- Resting place: Cedar Grove Cemetery, New London, Connecticut, U.S.

Nicoll Fosdick (November 9, 1785 in New London, New London County, Connecticut – May 7, 1868 in New London, Connecticut) was an American merchant and politician from New York.

== Life ==
He was the son of Nicoll Fosdick (1750–1821) and Abigail (Eldredge) Fosdick (1761–1809). He completed preparatory studies. He moved to Norway, New York where he became a merchant.

He was a presidential elector in 1816 and voted for James Monroe and Daniel D. Tompkins. He was a member of the New York State Assembly in 1818 and 1819.

Fosdick was elected as an Adams man to the 19th United States Congress, holding office from March 4, 1825, to March 3, 1827.

He returned to New London in 1843. He was Collector of Customs at the Port of New London from 1849 to 1853.

He was buried at the Cedar Grove Cemetery in New London.

U.S. House of Representatives
Preceded by Egbert Ten Eyck, Ela Collins	Member of the U.S. House of Representatives from New York's 20th congressional district 1825–1827 with Egbert Ten Eyck 1825 and Daniel Hugunin, Jr. 1825-27	Succeeded by Silas Wright, Jr., Rudolph Bunner
