= Jonah Sanford =

American politician

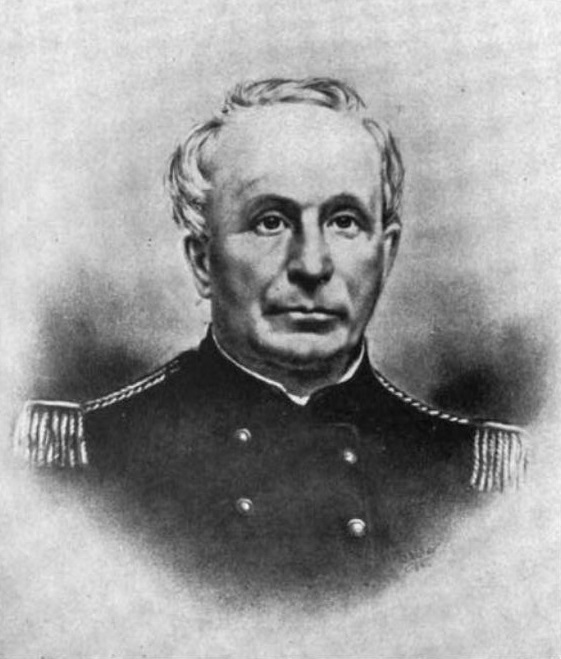

Member of the U.S. House of Representatives from New York's 20th district
- In office November 3, 1830 – March 3, 1831
- Preceded by: George Fisher
- Succeeded by: Daniel Wardwell

Personal details
- Born: November 30, 1790 Cornwall, Vermont, U.S.
- Died: December 25, 1867 (aged 77) Hopkinton, New York, U.S.
- Resting place: Hopkinton Cemetery

Jonah Sanford (November 30, 1790 – December 25, 1867) was an American lawyer, jurist, and War of 1812 veteran who served briefly as a U.S. representative from New York from 1830 to 1831.

He was a great-grandfather of Rollin Brewster Sanford.

== Biography ==
Born in Cornwall, Vermont, Sanford attended the district schools. He moved to Hopkinton, New York, in 1811. Enlisted as a volunteer for the War of 1812 and participated in the battle at Plattsburgh, September 11, 1814. He was appointed Justice of the Peace in 1818 and served for twenty-two years. He studied law. He was admitted to the bar and practiced in Franklin County. Town Supervisor of Hopkinton 1823-1826. Commissioned a captain of Volunteer Cavalry in 1827.

=== War of 1812 ===
He was promoted to lieutenant colonel in 1828, colonel in 1831, and brigadier general of state militia in 1832 and 1833.

=== Political career ===
He was a member of the New York State Assembly in 1829 and 1830.

Sanford was elected as a Jacksonian to the Twenty-first Congress to fill the vacancy caused by the resignation of Silas Wright, Jr., and served from November 3, 1830, to March 3, 1831.

=== Career after Congress ===
He served as judge of the court of common pleas from 1831 to 1837. He served as a delegate to the convention to revise the State constitution in 1846. He became a Republican upon the formation of that party in 1856. During the American Civil War, Sanford raised the 92nd New York Volunteer Infantry and was elected its colonel.

=== Death ===
He died in Hopkinton, New York, on December 25, 1867. He was interred in Hopkinton Cemetery.

=== Family ===
His son Jonah Sanford, Jr. (born 1821) was a member of the State Assembly in 1874.

== Sources ==
- United States Congress. "Jonah Sanford (id: S000050)". Biographical Directory of the United States Congress.

U.S. House of Representatives
Preceded by George Fisher	Member of the U.S. House of Representatives from New York's 20th congressional district November 3, 1830 – March 3, 1831	Succeeded by Daniel Wardwell
