= David Woodcock =

American politician

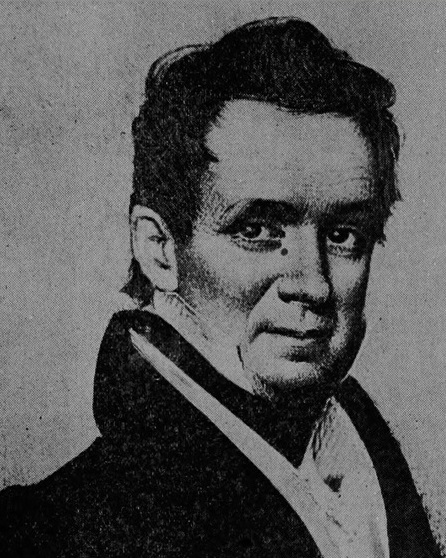
- Woodcock, 1904

Member of the U.S. House of Representatives from New York's 20th district
- In office December 3, 1821 – March 3, 1823
- Preceded by: Caleb Baker; Jonathan Richmond
- Succeeded by: Ela Collins; Egbert Ten Eyck

Member of the U.S. House of Representatives from New York's 25th district
- In office March 4, 1827 – March 3, 1829
- Preceded by: Charles Humphrey
- Succeeded by: Thomas Maxwell

Personal details
- Born: August 31, 1785 Williamstown, Massachusetts, USA
- Died: September 18, 1835 (aged 50) Ithaca, New York, USA
- Resting place: Ithaca City Cemetery, Ithaca, New York
- Party: Democratic-Republican
- Spouse: Mary I. Baker (m. 1807)
- Children: Mary Woodcock

David Woodcock (August 31, 1785 in Williamstown, Massachusetts – September 18, 1835 in Ithaca, New York) was an American lawyer and politician from New York.

== Life ==
Woodcock attended the public schools, then studied law, was admitted to the bar, and practiced. In 1807, he married Mary I. Baker (ca. 1787-1860). He moved to Ithaca, and he was appointed postmaster on November 19, 1808.

He was a member of the New York State Assembly (Seneca Co.) in 1814-15. He was District Attorney of the Thirteenth District (comprising Seneca, Tompkins, Cortland and Broome counties) from 1817 to 1818; and of Tompkins County from 1818 to 1823. He was the first President of the Cayuga Steamboat Company when it was organized in 1819.

Woodcock was elected as a Democratic-Republican to the 17th United States Congress, holding office from December 3, 1821, to March 3, 1823.

After leaving Congress Woodcock resumed the practice of law. He was President and Trustee of the Village of Ithaca in 1823, 1824, and 1826. He was again a member of the State Assembly (Tompkins Co.) in 1826.

In 1826 Woodcock was elected to the 20th United States Congress, holding office from March 4, 1827, to March 3, 1829. He took a prominent part in the Anti-Masonic movement and was a delegate to the first Anti-Masonic Party State convention, which was held in Utica in August 1828.

After leaving Congress the second time, he again resumed the practice of law. He died in 1835 and was buried at the City Cemetery in Ithaca.

His daughter Mary was married to New York Attorney General Stephen B. Cushing.

== Sources ==
- United States Congress. "David Woodcock (id: W000712)". Biographical Directory of the United States Congress.
- The New York Civil List compiled by Franklin Benjamin Hough (pages 71, 94, 190, 204, 317, 369, 383; Weed, Parsons and Co., 1858)

U.S. House of Representatives
Preceded by Caleb Baker, Jonathan Richmond	Member of the U.S. House of Representatives from New York's 20th congressional district 1821–1823 with William B. Rochester	Succeeded by Ela Collins, Egbert Ten Eyck
Preceded by Charles Humphrey	Member of the U.S. House of Representatives from New York's 25th congressional district 1827–1829	Succeeded by Thomas Maxwell
