= Rudolph Bunner =

American politician

Member of the U.S. House of Representatives from New York's 20th district
- In office March 4, 1827 – March 3, 1829
- Preceded by: Nicoll Fosdick
- Succeeded by: Joseph Hawkins

Personal details
- Born: August 17, 1779 Savannah, New York, United States
- Died: July 16, 1837 (aged 57) Oswego, New York, United States
- Party: Jacksonian
- Spouse: Elizabeth Matilda Church
- Education: Columbia College

Rudolph Bunner (August 17, 1779 – July 16, 1837) was an American lawyer, businessman, and trade merchant who served one term as a U.S. representative from New York from 1827 to 1829.

He was married to the granddaughter of Revolutionary War General Philip Schuyler.

== Early life ==
Rudolph Brunner was born on August 17, 1779, in Savannah, New York to George Bunner and Jane Cuyler. George was a merchant and mariner, and owner of the brig Mars in the West India trade. Bunner graduated from Columbia University in 1798. His maternal grandfather was Captain Teleman Cruger Cuyler and his great-grandparents were Henry Cuyler and Catherine Cruger. His maternal uncles included Captain Henry Cuyler, who was killed at the siege of Savannah, Jeremiah La Touche Cuyler (1768–1839), who was the first Federal Judge in Georgia.

His first-cousins included Richard Randolph Cuyler (1796–1865), who was president of the Central Railroad of Georgia and Dr. John M. Cuyler (1810–1884), who was Surgeon and Brevet Brigadier-General, United States Army.

== Career ==
After graduating from Columbia, he studied law and was admitted to the bar. He practiced in Newburgh, New York from 1819 until 1822. In October 1822, Bunner moved to Oswego, New York, where he engaged in manufacturing and served as a director of the Oswego Cloth & Carpet Manufacturing Company.

In addition to his legal work, he also was an extensive landowner and served as member of the first board of directors of the Oswego Canal Company.

In 1827, he was elected as a Jacksonian to the Twentieth Congress, serving from March 4, 1827 until March 3, 1829.

== Personal life ==
Bunner married Elizabeth Matilda Church (1783–1867), daughter of John Barker Church (1748–1818) and Angelica Schuyler (1756–1814). Elizabeth's grandfather was General Philip Schuyler (1733–1804) and her aunt was Elizabeth Schuyler Hamilton (wife of Alexander Hamilton, the first U.S. Secretary of the Treasury). Together, Rudolph and Elizabeth had six children.

He died in Oswego, New York, July 16, 1837, and was interred in Riverside Cemetery.

His grandson was Henry Cuyler Bunner (1855–1896), the novelist and poet.

U.S. House of Representatives
Preceded by Nicoll Fosdick	Member of the U.S. House of Representatives from New York's 20th congressional district 1827–1829	Succeeded by Joseph Hawkins
