= Charles Humphrey =

American politician

Speaker of the New York State Assembly
- In office January 6, 1835 – December 31, 1836
- Governor: William L. Marcy
- Preceded by: William Baker
- Succeeded by: Edward Livingston

Member of the New York State Assembly from Tompkins County
- In office January 1, 1842 – December 31, 1842
- Preceded by: Levi Hubbell
- Succeeded by: Sylvanus Larned
- In office January 1, 1834 – December 31, 1836
- Preceded by: Daniel B. Swartwood
- Succeeded by: Benjamin Jennings

Member of the U.S. House of Representatives from New York's 25th district
- In office March 4, 1825 – March 3, 1827
- Preceded by: Samuel Lawrence
- Succeeded by: David Woodcock

Personal details
- Born: February 14, 1792 New Windsor, New York, U.S.
- Died: April 17, 1850 (aged 58) Albany, New York, U.S.
- Party: Democratic (1835–1850); National Republican (before 1835)
- Spouse: Ann Eliza Belknap (m. 1816)
- Children: 7

Military service
- Allegiance: United States
- Branch/service: United States Army
- Years of service: 1813–1815
- Rank: Captain
- Unit: 41st Infantry Regiment
- Battles/wars: War of 1812

Charles Humphrey (February 14, 1792 – April 17, 1850) was an American lawyer and politician from New York. He served as a U.S. representative and as the speaker of the New York State Assembly.

== Life ==
He was born in Little Britain, Orange County, New York, but moved to Newburgh, New York, at an early age and attended the Newburgh Academy. Then he studied law. He entered the United States Army at the beginning of the War of 1812 as First Sergeant of Newburgh Company Number Five. He was commissioned a captain in the Forty-first Regiment, United States Infantry, on August 15, 1813. After the war he resumed the study of law, and was admitted to the bar in Newburgh, New York on January 11, 1816. He moved to Ithaca, New York in 1818, and engaged in the practice of law.

Humphrey was elected as an Adams candidate to the Nineteenth Congress, and served from March 4, 1825 to March 3, 1827.

He served as president of the village of Ithaca in 1828 and 1829. He was elected Surrogate of Tompkins County, New York, and served from March 4, 1831, to January 8, 1834.

He was a member from Tompkins County of the New York State Assembly from 1834 to 1836, when he was active in studying prison reform as well as education, and in 1842, and was Speaker in 1835 and 1836.

He was appointed clerk of the New York Supreme Court in 1843 and held that position until 1847.

Humphrey married Ann Eliza Belknap (1797–1861) in Newburgh, New York in 1816. The couple had seven children, three of whom survived to adulthood: William Ross Humphrey (1820–1901), Charles D. Humphrey (1832–1870), and Sarah B. Humphrey Judd (1835–1904).

He died in Albany, Albany County, New York, and was buried at the City Cemetery in Ithaca, N.Y.

Charles Humphrey is the namesake of Humphrey, New York.

U.S. House of Representatives
Preceded by Samuel Lawrence	Member of the U.S. House of Representatives from New York's 25th congressional district 1825–1827	Succeeded by David Woodcock
