= 1828 United States House of Representatives elections in Pennsylvania =

United States House of Representatives elections in Pennsylvania, 1828
- October 14, 1828

All 26 Pennsylvania seats to the United States House of Representatives
	Majority party	Minority party	Third party
Party	Jacksonian	Anti-Jacksonian	Anti-Masonic
Last election	20	6	0
Seats won	24	1	1
Seat change	▲4	▼5	▲1

Elections to the United States House of Representatives were held in Pennsylvania on October 14, 1828, for the 21st Congress. Members of three different parties were elected to the 21st Congress, the first time in US history that a third party won seats. The new Anti-Masonic Party won a total of 5 seats, 1 of which was in Pennsylvania.

== Background ==
In the previous election, 20 Jacksonians and 5 Anti-Jacksonians had been elected with one vacancy, which was filled in a special election by an Anti-Jacksonian, for a total of 20 Jacksonians and 6 Anti-Jacksonians.

== Congressional districts ==
Pennsylvania was divided into 18 districts, 6 of which were plural districts

- The 1st district consisted of southern Philadelphia County
- The 2nd district consisted of the City of Philadelphia
- The 3rd district consisted of northern Philadelphia County
- The 4th district (3 seats) consisted of Chester, Delaware and Lancaster Counties
- The 5th district consisted of Montgomery County
- The 6th district consisted of Dauphin and Lebanon Counties
- The 7th district (2 seats) consisted of Berks, Lehigh, and Schuylkill Counties
- The 8th district (2 seats) consisted of Bucks, Northampton, Pike, and Wayne Counties
- The 9th district (3 seats) consisted of Bradford, Columbia, Luzerne, Lycoming, McKeane, Northumberland, Potter, Susquehanna, and Tioga Counties
- The 10th district consisted of York County
- The 11th district (2 seats) consisted of Adams, Cumberland, Franklin, and Perry Counties
- The 12th district consisted of Centre, Clearfield, Huntingdon, Mifflin, and Union Counties
- The 13th district consisted of Bedford, Cambria, and Somerset Counties
- The 14th district consisted of Fayette and Greene Counties
- The 15th district consisted of Washington County
- The 16th district (2 seats) consisted of Allegheny, Armstrong, Beaver, and Butler Counties
- The 17th district consisted of Indiana, Jefferson, and Westmoreland Counties
- The 18th district consisted of Crawford, Erie, Mercer, Venango, and Warren Counties

Note: Several of these counties covered larger areas than today, having since been divided into smaller counties

== Election results ==
20 incumbents (15 Jacksonians and 5 Anti-Jacksonians) ran for re-election, of whom 12 (all Jacksonians) were re-elected. The incumbents Charles Miner (AJ) of the 4th district, George Kremer (J), Espy Van Horne (J), and Samuel McKean (J) of the 9th district, John Mitchell (J) of the 12th district and Robert Orr, Jr. (J) of the 16th district did not run for re-election.

A total of 8 seats changed parties. One seat changed from Jacksonian control to Anti-Masonic control, one changed from Jacksonian to Anti-Jacksonian, and six changed from Anti-Jacksonian to Jacksonian, for a net change of five seats lost by the Anti-Jacksonians, four gained by the Jacksonians, and one gained by the Anti-Masonics.

1828 United States House election results
District	Jacksonian			Anti-Jacksonian			Other		
1st	Joel B. Sutherland (I)	3,072	74.7%	Peter A. Browne	1,038	25.3%			
2nd	Joseph Hemphill	3,569	54.2%	John Sergeant (I)	3,012	45.8%			
3rd	Daniel H. Miller (I)	4,497	68.3%	Samuel Harvey	2,090	31.7%			
4th 3 seats	James Buchanan (I)	10,004	17.6%	Samuel Anderson (I)	9,023	15.9%			
4th 3 seats	Joshua Evans, Jr.	9,932	17.5%	Townsend Haines	9,006	15.9%			
4th 3 seats	George G. Leiper	9,538	17.4%	William Hiester	8,957	15.8%			
5th	John B. Sterigere (I)	3,275	56.9%	Joseph Royer	2,484	43.1%			
6th	Innis Green (I)	3,129	72.0%	Valentine Hummel	1,214	28.0%			
7th 2 seats	Joseph Fry, Jr. (I)	4,750	31.1%	Henry King	3,118	20.4%			
7th 2 seats	Henry A. P. Muhlenberg	4,391	28.8%	William Addams (I)	2,994	19.6%			
8th 2 seats	George Wolf (I)	6,736	30.6%	James M. Porter	4,387	20.0%			
8th 2 seats	Samuel D. Ingham	6,591	30.0%	Thomas G. Kennedy	4,273	19.4%			
9th 3 seats	Philander Stephens	9,331	26.9%	John Murray	2,944	8.5%			
9th 3 seats	James Ford	9,244	26.6%	Chauncey Alford	2,583	7.4%			
9th 3 seats	Alem Marr	8,999	25.9%	George M. Hollenback	1,632	4.7%			
10th	Adam King (I)	2,514	63.2%	William McIlvine	1,463	36.8%			
11th	Thomas H. Crawford	6,792	29.9%	James Wilson (I)	4,657	20.5%			
11th	William Ramsey (I)	6,667	29.3%	George Chambers	4,635	20.4%			
12th	John Scott	3,203	44.3%	William P. Maclay	2,265	31.3%			
12th	David H. Huling	1,768	24.4%						
13th	Chauncey Forward (I)	2,934	51.9%	William Piper	2,722	48.1%			
14th	Thomas Irwin	3,247	56.3%	Andrew Stewart (I)	2,523	43.7%			
15th	William McCreery	2,689	64.8%	Joseph Lawrence (I)	1,461	35.2%			
16th 2 seats	John Gilmore	6,172	29.6%	Robert Moore	3,813	18.3%	William Wilkins	5,133	24.7%
16th 2 seats	James S. Stevenson (I)	4,947	23.8%				William Ayers	752	3.6%
17th	Richard Coulter (I)	4,770	100%						
18th	Stephen Barlow (I)	3,128	45.7%	Thomas H. Sill	3,718	54.3%			

== Special elections ==
Two special elections were held in 1829 for the 21st Congress. The first was held on October 13, 1829 in the 8th district to fill two vacancies caused by the resignations of Samuel D. Ingham (J) and George Wolf (J) before the first meeting of the 21st Congress. Wolf's resignation was due to his having been elected Governor of Pennsylvania. The second was held on December 15, 1829 in the 16th district, to fill a vacancy caused by the resignation of William Wilkins (AM) on November 9, 1829, before the first session of the 21st Congress began.

1828 Special elections results
District	Jacksonian			Anti-Masonic		
8th 2 seats	Peter Ihrie, Jr.	5,602	27.2%			
8th 2 seats	Samuel A. Smith	5,168	25.1%			
8th 2 seats	Nathaniel B. Eldred	4,993	24.3%			
8th 2 seats	George Harrison	4,822	23.4%			
16th	James S. Stevenson	3,090	42.3%	Harmar Denny	4,208	57.7%

No seat changed parties after these special elections.
