= 1830–31 United States House of Representatives elections =

House elections for the 22nd U.S. Congress

- July 5, 1830 – October 3, 1831 (Note: Not including special elections and some regular elections that went to multiple ballots.)

All 213 seats in the United States House of Representatives 107 seats needed for a majority
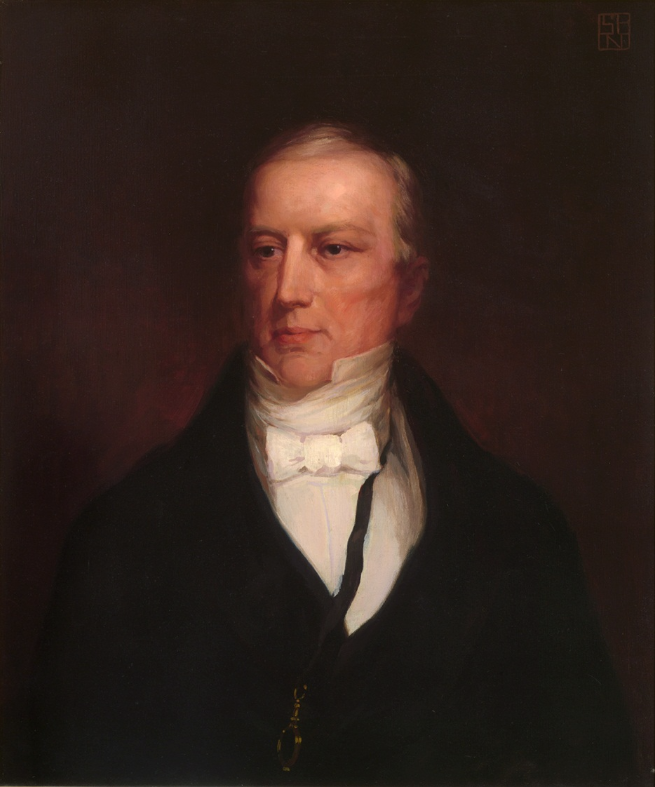

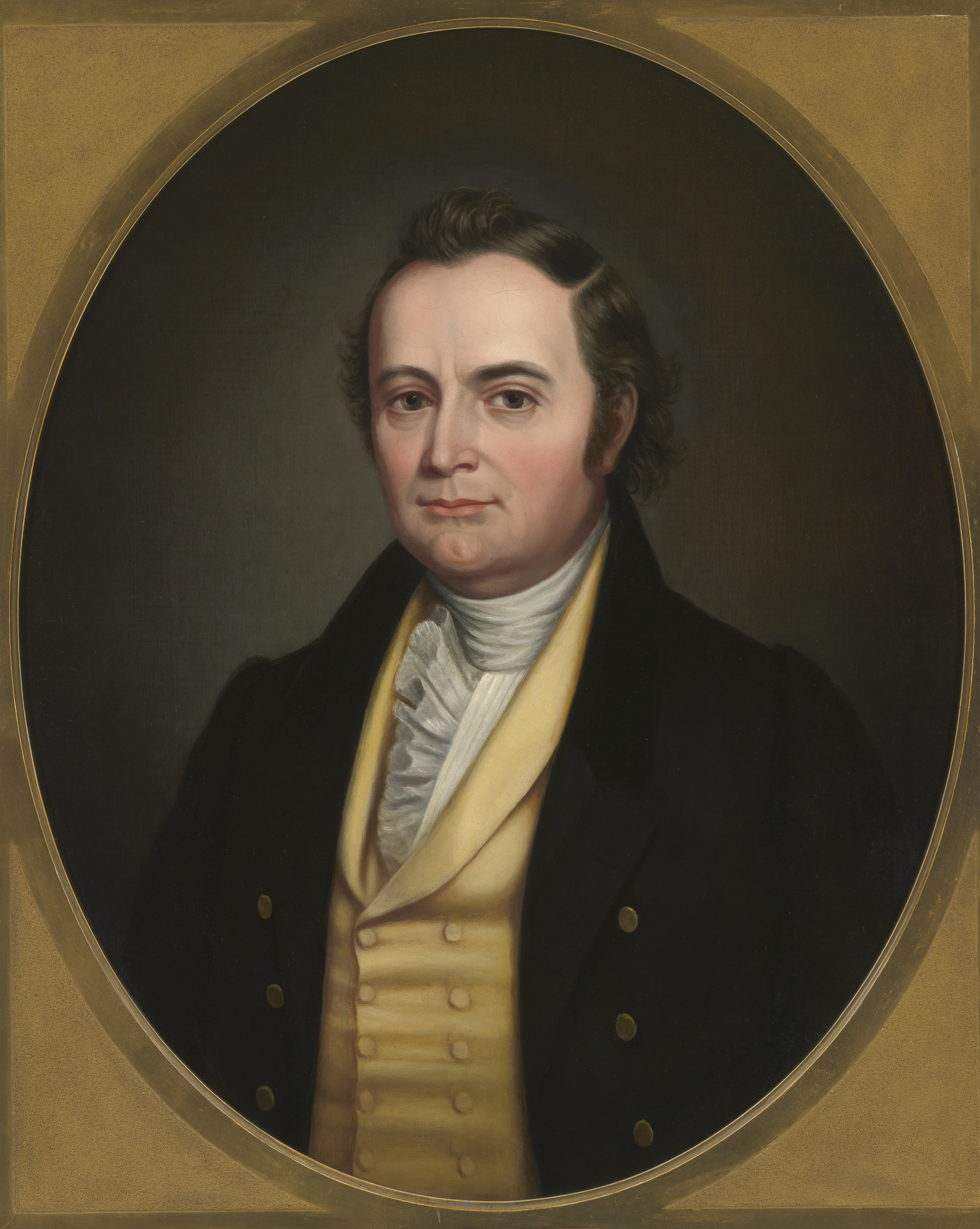
	Majority party	Minority party
Leader	Andrew Stevenson	John W. Taylor
Party	Jacksonian	National Republican
Leader's seat	Virginia 9th	New York 17th
Last election	136 seats	72 seats
Seats won	126 (Note: Includes 5 seats won by Unionist candidates in South Carolina)	66
Seat change	▼10	▼6
Popular vote	595,793 (Note: Includes 3,458 votes for Unionist candidates in South Carolina)	355,016
Percentage	52.93%	31.54%
Swing	▼2.02 pp	▼6.27 pp
	Third party	Fourth party
Party	Anti-Masonic	Nullifier
Last election	5 seats	0 seats
Seats won	17	4
Seat change	▲12	▲4
Popular vote	136,861	3,881
Percentage	12.16%	0.34%
Swing	▲8.71 pp	New party
Speaker before election
Andrew Stevenson
Jacksonian
Elected Speaker
Andrew Stevenson
Jacksonian

The 1830–31 United States House of Representatives elections were held on various dates in various states between July 5, 1830, and October 3, 1831. Each state set its own date for its elections to the House of Representatives before the first session of the 22nd United States Congress convened on December 5, 1831. Elections were held for all 213 seats, representing 24 states.

The supporters of President Andrew Jackson lost ten seats during his first term, but managed to maintain control of the chamber amidst the growth of two new opposition movements.

The brash style of Congress during the administration of Jackson caused a number of Americans to become dissatisfied with the government and both of the major parties. Anger over the Tariff of 1828 also provided a major issue, particularly in the agricultural Southern United States. The Jacksonians remained firmly in control of the House, but lost several seats, as did the minority National Republicans. The Anti-Masonic Party, an aspiring third party which was based on a single issue (distrust of Freemasonry), was actually able to gain a dozen seats, and four South Carolina Congressman who called themselves Nullifiers (based on the principle of states' rights) were also elected. Thus, this was the first election in the House where both major parties lost seats at the same time; this would not occur again until the 1854 elections.

== Election summaries ==
Not including special elections.

↓
66	17	4	126
National Republican	AM	N	Jacksonian

State	Type	Date	Total seats	National Republican		Anti-Masonic		Jacksonian		Nullifier	
State	Type	Date	Total seats	Seats	Change	Seats	Change	Seats	Change	Seats	Change
Louisiana	Districts	July 5–7, 1830	3	2	Steady	0	Steady	1	Steady	0	Steady
Mississippi	At-large	August 2–3, 1830	1	0	Steady	0	Steady	1	Steady	0	Steady
Vermont	Districts	September 6, 1830 (Note: In 4th district, the election wasn't completed until 1832.)	5	3	▼1	2	▲1	0	Steady	0	Steady
Maine	Districts	September 13, 1830	7	1	▼2	0	Steady	6	▲2	0	Steady
Georgia	At-large	October 4, 1830	7	0	Steady	0	Steady	7	Steady	0	Steady
Ohio	Districts	October 12, 1830	14	8	▲2	0	Steady	6	▼2	0	Steady
Pennsylvania	Districts	October 12, 1830	26	2	▲1	7	▲6	17	▼7	0	Steady
South Carolina	Districts	October 11–12, 1830	9	0	Steady	0	Steady	5	▼4	4	▲4
Massachusetts	Districts	November 1, 1830	13	13	Steady	0	Steady	0	Steady	0	Steady
New York	Districts	November 1–3, 1830	34	3	▼8	8	▲5	23	▲3	0	Steady
New Jersey	At-large	November 6, 1830	6	6	Steady	0	Steady	0	Steady	0	Steady
Delaware	At-large	November 13, 1830	1	1	Steady	0	Steady	0	Steady	0	Steady
Late elections (after the March 4, 1831 beginning of the term)
New Hampshire	At-large	March 8, 1831	6	0	Steady	0	Steady	6	Steady	0	Steady
Connecticut	At-large	April 14, 1831	6	6	Steady	0	Steady	0	Steady	0	Steady
Virginia	Districts	April 1831	22	5	▼1	0	Steady	17	▲1	0	Steady
Alabama	Districts	August 1, 1831	3	0	Steady	0	Steady	3	Steady	0	Steady
Illinois	At-large	August 1, 1831	1	0	Steady	0	Steady	1	Steady	0	Steady
Kentucky	Districts	August 1, 1831	12	4	▲2	0	Steady	8	▼2	0	Steady
Missouri	At-large	August 2, 1831	1	0	Steady	0	Steady	1	Steady	0	Steady
Indiana	Districts	August 5, 1831	3	0	▼2	0	Steady	3	▲2	0	Steady
Tennessee	Districts	August 4–5, 1831	9	1	Steady	0	Steady	8	Steady	0	Steady
North Carolina	Districts	August 11, 1831	13	2	▼1	0	Steady	11	▲1	0	Steady
Rhode Island	At-large	August 23, 1831	2	2	Steady	0	Steady	0	Steady	0	Steady
Maryland	Districts	October 3, 1831	9	5	▲2	0	Steady	4	▼2	0	Steady
Total			213	66 31.0%	▼6	17 8.0%	▲12	126 59.2%	▼10	4 1.9%	▲4

House seats
Jacksonian	59.15%
Nat. Republican	30.99%
Anti-Masonic	7.98%
Nullifier	1.88%

== Special elections ==
=== 21st Congress ===
District	Incumbent			This race	
District	Member	Party	First elected	Results	Candidates
Maine 5	James W. Ripley	Jacksonian	1826 (special)	Incumbent resigned March 12, 1830. New member elected September 13, 1830 and seated December 6, 1830. Jacksonian hold.	▌ ✓ Cornelius Holland (Jacksonian) 55.70%; ▌Reuel Washburn (National Republican) 43.14%; Scattering 1.16%
Ohio 11	John M. Goodenow	Jacksonian	1828	Incumbent resigned April 9, 1830, after being appointed judge of the Supreme Court of Ohio. New member elected October 11, 1830 and seated December 6, 1830. Winner was later elected to the next term; see below.	▌ ✓ Humphrey H. Leavitt (Jacksonian) 51.20%; ▌Samuel S. Stokely (National Republican) 48.80%
Virginia 22	Alexander Smyth	Jacksonian	1817; 1828 (retired); 1827	Incumbent died April 17, 1830. New member elected in November 1830 and seated December 6, 1830. Jacksonian hold. Winner was later elected to the next term; see below.	▌ ✓ Joseph Draper (Jacksonian) 46.34%; ▌Charles C. Johnston (Independent) 32.37%; ▌John N. Humes (Independent) 15.35%; ▌F. Smith (Independent) 5.95%
New York 6	Hector Craig	Jacksonian	1822; 1824 (lost); 1828	Incumbent resigned July 12, 1830. New member elected November 3, 1830 and seated December 6, 1830. National Republican gain.	▌ ✓ Samuel W. Eager (National Republican) 50.71%; ▌Theodore Fisk (Jacksonian) 49.29%
Virginia 11	Philip P. Barbour	Jacksonian	1815; 1824 (retired); 1827	Incumbent resigned October 15, 1830, after being appointed judge of US Circuit Court of the Eastern District of Virginia. New member elected November 25, 1830 and seated December 6, 1830. Jacksonian hold.	▌ ✓ John M. Patton (Jacksonian) 95.97%; Scattering 4.03%

=== 22nd Congress ===
District	Incumbent			This race	
District	Member	Party	First elected	Results	Candidates
North Carolina 2	Vacant			Vacancy in term. New member elected in 1831 and seated May 12, 1831. Jacksonian gain.	▌ ✓ John Branch (Jacksonian); [data missing]
Missouri at-large	Spencer D. Pettis	National; Republican	1824	Incumbent died August 28, 1831. New member elected October 31, 1831 and seated October 31, 1831. National Republican hold.	▌ ✓ William H. Ashley (National Republican) 50.62%; ▌Robert W. Wells (Jacksonian) 49.38%
Vermont 2	Rollin C. Mallary	National; Republican	1820 (contested)	Incumbent died April 15, 1831. New member elected November 1, 1831 and seated December 5, 1831. Anti-Masonic gain.	First ballot (July 5, 1831): ▌William Slade (Anti-Masonic) 49.1%; ▌Charles K. Williams (National Republican) 39.4%; ▌William White (Jacksonian) 11.0%; Second ballot (September 6, 1831): ▌William Slade (Anti-Masonic) 49.0%; ▌Charles K. Williams (National Republican) 40.6%; ▌William White (Jacksonian) 8.9%; Third ballot (November 1, 1831): ▌ ✓ William Slade (Anti-Masonic) 57.5%; ▌Robert Temple (National Republican) 28.1%; ▌William White (Jacksonian) 14.3%
Pennsylvania 11	William Ramsey	Jacksonian	1826	Incumbent died September 29, 1831, before the new Congress convened. New member elected November 22, 1831 and seated December 5, 1831. Jacksonian hold.	▌ ✓ Robert McCoy (Jacksonian) 2,459 votes; ▌John D. Mahon (Independent) 1,931 votes; ▌James McSherry (Anti-Masonic) 1,154 votes
Georgia at-large	Wilson Lumpkin	Jacksonian	1814; 1816 (lost); 1826	Incumbent resigned in 1831 before the convening of Congress. New member elected December 12, 1831 and seated January 21, 1832. Jacksonian hold.	▌ ✓ Augustin S. Clayton (Jacksonian) 52.16%; ▌William Schley (Jacksonian) 47.83%
New York 20	George Fisher	National; Republican	1828	Incumbent lost contested election February 5, 1830 to Silas Wright, who then failed to qualify. New member elected November 3, 1830 and seated December 6, 1830. Jacksonian gain. Winner was not a candidate for the next term; see below.	▌ ✓ Jonah Sanford (Jacksonian) 60.64%; ▌Harvey D. Smith (National Republican) 39.36%
North Carolina 6	Robert Potter	Jacksonian	1829	Incumbent resigned in November 1831. New member elected December 15, 1831 and seated January 6, 1832. Jacksonian hold.	▌ ✓ Micajah T. Hawkins (Jacksonian) 35.32%; ▌Thomas N. Mann (Jacksonian) 32.12%; ▌James Wyche (National Republican) 19.84%; ▌[FNU] Pope (Note: Full name unknown) (Unknown) 12.73%

== Alabama ==
District	Incumbent			This race	
District	Member	Party	First elected	Results	Candidates
Alabama 1 "Northern District"	Clement C. Clay	Jacksonian	1829	Incumbent re-elected.	▌ ✓ Clement C. Clay (Jacksonian) 100.00%
Alabama 2 "Middle District"	R. E. B. Baylor	Jacksonian	1825	Incumbent lost-re-election. Jacksonian hold.	▌ ✓ Samuel W. Mardis (Jacksonian) 41.58%; ▌Jesse W. Garth (National Republican) 35.50%; ▌R. E. B. Baylor (Jacksonian) 22.92%
Alabama 3 "Southern District"	Dixon H. Lewis	Jacksonian	1829	Incumbent re-elected.	▌ ✓ Dixon H. Lewis (Jacksonian) 57.64%; ▌John Murphy (Jacksonian) 42.36%

== Connecticut ==
Connecticut elected its six at-large members on a general ticket on April 14, 1831, after the term began but before the Congress convened.

District	Incumbent			This race	
District	Member	Party	First elected	Results	Candidates
Connecticut at-large 6 seats on a general ticket	Ralph I. Ingersoll	National; Republican	1825	Incumbent re-elected.	▌ ✓ Ebenezer Young (National Republican) 16.3%; ▌ ✓ Noyes Barber (National Republican) 12.3%; ▌ ✓ Ralph I. Ingersoll (National Republican) 12.2%; ▌ ✓ Jabez W. Huntington (National Republican) 11.2%; ▌ ✓ William W. Ellsworth (National Republican) 11.2%; ▌ ✓ William L. Storrs (National Republican) 11.0%; ▌Isaac Toucey (Jacksonian) 5.9%; ▌Simeon Minor (Jacksonian) 5.9%; ▌Elisha Halsey (Jacksonian) 5.3%; ▌William Hollabird (Jacksonian) 4.1%; ▌Thaddeus Betts (Unknown) 3.9%
Connecticut at-large 6 seats on a general ticket	Noyes Barber	National; Republican	1821	Incumbent re-elected.	▌ ✓ Ebenezer Young (National Republican) 16.3%; ▌ ✓ Noyes Barber (National Republican) 12.3%; ▌ ✓ Ralph I. Ingersoll (National Republican) 12.2%; ▌ ✓ Jabez W. Huntington (National Republican) 11.2%; ▌ ✓ William W. Ellsworth (National Republican) 11.2%; ▌ ✓ William L. Storrs (National Republican) 11.0%; ▌Isaac Toucey (Jacksonian) 5.9%; ▌Simeon Minor (Jacksonian) 5.9%; ▌Elisha Halsey (Jacksonian) 5.3%; ▌William Hollabird (Jacksonian) 4.1%; ▌Thaddeus Betts (Unknown) 3.9%
Connecticut at-large 6 seats on a general ticket	Ebenezer Young	National; Republican	1829	Incumbent re-elected.	▌ ✓ Ebenezer Young (National Republican) 16.3%; ▌ ✓ Noyes Barber (National Republican) 12.3%; ▌ ✓ Ralph I. Ingersoll (National Republican) 12.2%; ▌ ✓ Jabez W. Huntington (National Republican) 11.2%; ▌ ✓ William W. Ellsworth (National Republican) 11.2%; ▌ ✓ William L. Storrs (National Republican) 11.0%; ▌Isaac Toucey (Jacksonian) 5.9%; ▌Simeon Minor (Jacksonian) 5.9%; ▌Elisha Halsey (Jacksonian) 5.3%; ▌William Hollabird (Jacksonian) 4.1%; ▌Thaddeus Betts (Unknown) 3.9%
Connecticut at-large 6 seats on a general ticket	Jabez W. Huntington	National; Republican	1829	Incumbent re-elected.	▌ ✓ Ebenezer Young (National Republican) 16.3%; ▌ ✓ Noyes Barber (National Republican) 12.3%; ▌ ✓ Ralph I. Ingersoll (National Republican) 12.2%; ▌ ✓ Jabez W. Huntington (National Republican) 11.2%; ▌ ✓ William W. Ellsworth (National Republican) 11.2%; ▌ ✓ William L. Storrs (National Republican) 11.0%; ▌Isaac Toucey (Jacksonian) 5.9%; ▌Simeon Minor (Jacksonian) 5.9%; ▌Elisha Halsey (Jacksonian) 5.3%; ▌William Hollabird (Jacksonian) 4.1%; ▌Thaddeus Betts (Unknown) 3.9%
Connecticut at-large 6 seats on a general ticket	William L. Storrs	National; Republican	1829	Incumbent re-elected.	▌ ✓ Ebenezer Young (National Republican) 16.3%; ▌ ✓ Noyes Barber (National Republican) 12.3%; ▌ ✓ Ralph I. Ingersoll (National Republican) 12.2%; ▌ ✓ Jabez W. Huntington (National Republican) 11.2%; ▌ ✓ William W. Ellsworth (National Republican) 11.2%; ▌ ✓ William L. Storrs (National Republican) 11.0%; ▌Isaac Toucey (Jacksonian) 5.9%; ▌Simeon Minor (Jacksonian) 5.9%; ▌Elisha Halsey (Jacksonian) 5.3%; ▌William Hollabird (Jacksonian) 4.1%; ▌Thaddeus Betts (Unknown) 3.9%
Connecticut at-large 6 seats on a general ticket	William W. Ellsworth	National; Republican	1829	Incumbent re-elected.	▌ ✓ Ebenezer Young (National Republican) 16.3%; ▌ ✓ Noyes Barber (National Republican) 12.3%; ▌ ✓ Ralph I. Ingersoll (National Republican) 12.2%; ▌ ✓ Jabez W. Huntington (National Republican) 11.2%; ▌ ✓ William W. Ellsworth (National Republican) 11.2%; ▌ ✓ William L. Storrs (National Republican) 11.0%; ▌Isaac Toucey (Jacksonian) 5.9%; ▌Simeon Minor (Jacksonian) 5.9%; ▌Elisha Halsey (Jacksonian) 5.3%; ▌William Hollabird (Jacksonian) 4.1%; ▌Thaddeus Betts (Unknown) 3.9%

== Delaware ==
District	Incumbent			This race	
District	Member	Party	First elected	Results	Candidates
Delaware at-large	Kensey Johns	National; Republican	1827 (special)	Incumbent retired. National Republican hold.	▌ ✓ John J. Milligan (National Republican) 52.68%; ▌Henry M. Ridgely (Jacksonian) 47.32%

== Georgia ==
Georgia elected its 7 at-large members on October 4, 1830.

District	Incumbent			This race	
District	Member	Party	First elected	Results	Candidates
Georgia at-large 7 seats on a general ticket	Richard Henry Wilde	Jacksonian	1814; 1816 (lost); 1824 (special); 1826 (lost); 1827 (special)	Incumbent re-elected.	▌ ✓ Richard H. Wilde (Jacksonian; Troup) 11.53%; ▌ ✓ Wilson Lumpkin (Jacksonian) 11.35%; ▌ ✓ Daniel Newnan (Jacksonian; Clark) 10.72%; ▌ ✓ Henry G. Lamar (Jacksonian) 9.81%; ▌ ✓ Thomas F. Foster (Jacksonian; Troup) 9.40%; ▌ ✓ James M. Wayne (Jacksonian; Troup) 9.29%; ▌ ✓ Wiley Thompson (Jacksonian) 9.24%; ▌Charles E. Haynes (Jacksonian; Troup) 7.55%; ▌Thomas U. Charlton (Jacksonian) 6.59%; ▌Roger L. Gamble (Jacksonian; Troup) 6.25%; ▌Seaton Gratland (Jacksonian) 6.02%; ▌Reuben C. Shorter (Unknown) 2.26%
Georgia at-large 7 seats on a general ticket	Wilson Lumpkin	Jacksonian	1814; 1816 (lost); 1826	Incumbent re-elected.	
Georgia at-large 7 seats on a general ticket	Charles E. Haynes	Jacksonian	1824	Incumbent lost re-election. Jacksonian hold.	
Georgia at-large 7 seats on a general ticket	Henry G. Lamar	Jacksonian	1829 (special)	Incumbent re-elected.	
Georgia at-large 7 seats on a general ticket	Thomas F. Foster	Jacksonian	1828	Incumbent re-elected.	
Georgia at-large 7 seats on a general ticket	James M. Wayne	Jacksonian	1828	Incumbent re-elected.	
Georgia at-large 7 seats on a general ticket	Wiley Thompson	Jacksonian	1820	Incumbent re-elected.	

== Illinois ==
Illinois elected its sole member late on August 1, 1831.

District	Incumbent			This race	
District	Member	Party	First elected	Results	Candidates
Illinois at-large	Joseph Duncan	Jacksonian	1826	Incumbent re-elected.	▌ ✓ Joseph Duncan (Jacksonian) 54.11%; ▌Sidney Breese (Jacksonian) 19.31%; ▌Edward Coles (Jacksonian) 14.08%; ▌Alexander P. Field (Jacksonian) 7.63%; ▌James Turney (Unknown) 4.87%

== Indiana ==
Indiana elected its three members late on August 5, 1831.

District	Incumbent			This race	
District	Member	Party	First elected	Results	Candidates
Indiana 1	Ratliff Boon	Jacksonian	1828	Incumbent re-elected.	▌ ✓ Ratliff Boon (Jacksonian) 50.93%; ▌John Law (National Republican) 49.07%
Indiana 2	Jonathan Jennings	National; Republican	1822 (special)	Incumbent lost re-election. New member elected. Jacksonian gain.	▌ ✓ John Carr (Jacksonian) 32.78%; ▌William W. Wick (National Republican) 31.09%; ▌James B. Ray (Independent) 11.69%; ▌Jonathan Jennings (National Republican) 11.34%; ▌John H. Thompson (Independent) 10.03%; ▌Isaac Howk (Independent) 3.06%
Indiana 3	John Test	National; Republican	1828	Incumbent lost re-election. New member elected. Jacksonian gain.	▌ ✓ Johnathan McCarty (Jacksonian) 42.6%; ▌Oliver H. Smith (Jacksonian) 36.18%; ▌John Test (National Republican) 21.22%

== Kentucky ==
District	Incumbent			This race	
District	Member	Party	First elected	Results	Candidates
Kentucky 1	Henry Daniel	Jacksonian	1827	Incumbent re-elected.	▌ ✓ Henry Daniel (Jacksonian) 51.74%; ▌Amos Davis (National Republican) 48.26%
Kentucky 2	Nicholas D. Coleman	Jacksonian	1829	Incumbent lost re-election. National Republican gain.	▌ ✓ Thomas A. Marshall (National Republican) 53.15%; ▌Nicholas D. Coleman (Jacksonian) 46.85%
Kentucky 3	James Clark	National Republican	1825	Incumbent renominated but declined. National Republican hold.	▌ ✓ Chilton Allan (National Republican) 66.65%; ▌James Shannon (Jacksonian) 33.35%
Kentucky 4	Robert P. Letcher	National Republican	1822	Incumbent re-elected.	▌ ✓ Robert P. Letcher (National Republican) 53.39%; ▌Daniel Garrard (Jacksonian) 46.61%
Kentucky 5	Richard M. Johnson	Jacksonian	1829	Incumbent re-elected.	▌ ✓ Richard M. Johnson (Jacksonian) 100%
Kentucky 6	Joseph Lecompte	Jacksonian	1827	Incumbent re-elected.	▌ ✓ Joseph Lecompte (Jacksonian) 52.46%; ▌James Ford (National Republican) 47.54%
Kentucky 7	John Kincaid	Jacksonian	1829	Incumbent retired. Jacksonian hold.	▌ ✓ John Adair (Jacksonian) 54.90%; ▌ Unknown (National Republican) 45.10%
Kentucky 8	Nathan Gaither	Jacksonian	1829	Incumbent re-elected.	▌ ✓ Nathan Gaither (Jacksonian) No Data; ▌Samuel Brents (National Republican) No Data
Kentucky 9	Charles A. Wickliffe	Jacksonian	1822	Incumbent re-elected.	▌ ✓ Charles A. Wickliffe (Jacksonian) 52.49%; ▌Charles M. Thurston (National Republican) 47.51%
Kentucky 10	Joel Yancey	Jacksonian	1827	Incumbent lost reelection. National Republican gain.	▌ ✓ Christopher Tompkins (National Republican) 51.23%; ▌Joel Yancey (Jacksonian) 48.77%
Kentucky 11	Thomas Chilton	Jacksonian	1827	Incumbent switched parties and lost reelection. Jacksonian hold.	▌ ✓ Albert Hawes (Jacksonian) 50.06%; ▌Thomas Chilton (National Republican) 49.94%
Kentucky 12	Chittenden Lyon	Jacksonian	1827	Incumbent re-elected.	▌ ✓ Chittenden Lyon (Jacksonian) 56.56%; ▌James Breathitt (National Republican) 43.44%

== Louisiana ==
District	Incumbent			This race	
District	Member	Party	First elected	Results	Candidates
Louisiana 1	Edward D. White Sr.	National Republican	1828	Incumbent re-elected.	▌ ✓ Edward D. White Sr. (National Republican) 100%
Louisiana 2	Henry H. Gurley	National Republican	1822	Incumbent retired. Jacksonian gain.	▌ ✓ Philemon Thomas (Jacksonian) 41.53%; ▌Eleazer W. Ripley (Unknown) 37.54%; ▌Lafayette Saunders (Unknown) 20.93%
Louisiana 3	Walter Hampden Overton	Jacksonian	1822	Incumbent retired. National Republican gain.	▌ ✓ Henry A. Bullard (National Republican) 54.30%; ▌Pierre A. Rost (Jacksonian) 45.70%

== Maine ==
District	Incumbent			This race	
District	Member	Party	First elected	Results	Candidates
Maine 1	Rufus McIntire	Jacksonian	1827	Incumbent re-elected.	▌ ✓ Rufus McIntire (Jacksonian) 52.00%; ▌George Scamman (National Republican) 47.02%; Scattering 0.98%
Maine 2	John Anderson	Jacksonian	1824	Incumbent re-elected.	▌ ✓ John Anderson (Jacksonian) 56.91%; ▌Simon Greenleaf (National Republican) 41.91%; Scattering 1.18%
Maine 3	Joseph F. Wingate	National Republican	1826	Incumbent lost reelection. Jacksonian gain.	First ballot (September 13, 1830): ▌Edward Kavanagh (Jacksonian) 47.11%; ▌Moses Shaw (National Republican) 46.02%; ▌Joseph F. Wingate (National Republican) 2.71%; ▌Parker McCobb (Unknown) 2.67%; Scattering 1.5%; Second Ballot (November 22, 1830): ▌ ✓ Edward Kavanagh (Jacksonian) 52.77%; ▌Moses Shaw (National Republican) 41.62%; ▌Parker McCobb (Unknown) 5.61%
Maine 4	George Evans	National Republican	1829	Incumbent re-elected.	▌ ✓ George Evans (National Republican) 58.02%; ▌Nathan Cutler (Jacksonian) 38.85%; ▌John Southwick (Unknown) 2.31%; Scattering 0.82%
Maine 5	Cornelius Holland	Jacksonian	1830 (Note: Incumbent first elected in special election on September 13, 1830.)	Incumbent re-elected.	▌ ✓ Cornelius Holland (Jacksonian) 55.68%; ▌Reuel Washburn (National Republican) 43.24%; Scattering 1.08%
Maine 6	Leonard Jarvis	Jacksonian	1830	Incumbent re-elected.	▌ ✓ Leonard Jarvis (Jacksonian) 53.30%; ▌John S. Kimball (National Republican) 41.14%; ▌Samuel Upton (Unknown) 3.70%; Scattering 1.86%
Maine 7	Samuel Butman	National Republican	1827	Incumbent retired. Jacksonian gain.	▌ ✓ James Bates (Jacksonian) 51.10%; ▌Ebenezer S. Phelps (National Republican) 47.62; Scattering 1.28%

== Maryland ==
Maryland elected its nine members on October 3, 1831. In the fifth district, two members were elected on a general ticket. There was a net gain of 2 National Republicans thereby increasing their ratio from 3-to-6 to 5-to-4.

District	Incumbent			This race	
District	Member	Party	First elected	Results	Candidates
Maryland 1	Clement Dorsey	National; Republican	1824	Incumbent retired. National Republican hold.	▌ ✓ Daniel Jenifer (National Republican) 59.0%; ▌John J. Brooke (Unknown) 41.0%
Maryland 2	Benedict Joseph Semmes	National; Republican	1829	Incumbent re-elected.	▌ ✓ Benedict Joseph Semmes (National Republican) 62.3%; ▌Alexander Keech (Unknown) 37.7%
Maryland 3	George C. Washington	National; Republican	1826	Incumbent re-elected.	▌ ✓ George C. Washington (National Republican); Uncontested
Maryland 4	Michael Sprigg	Jacksonian	1826	Incumbent lost re-election. Jacksonian hold.	▌ ✓ Francis Thomas (Jacksonian) 53.5%; ▌Michael Sprigg (Jacksonian) 46.5%
Maryland 5 2 seats on a general ticket	Benjamin C. Howard	Jacksonian	1829	Incumbent re-elected.	▌ ✓ Benjamin C. Howard (Jacksonian) 32.64%; ▌ ✓ John T. H. Worthington (Jacksonian) 30.42%; ▌Ebenezer L. Finley (National Republican) 26.35%; ▌Elias Brown (Jacksonian) 10.58%
Maryland 5 2 seats on a general ticket	Elias Brown	Jacksonian	1829	Incumbent lost re-election. Jacksonian hold.	▌ ✓ Benjamin C. Howard (Jacksonian) 32.64%; ▌ ✓ John T. H. Worthington (Jacksonian) 30.42%; ▌Ebenezer L. Finley (National Republican) 26.35%; ▌Elias Brown (Jacksonian) 10.58%
Maryland 6	George E. Mitchell	Jacksonian	1829	Incumbent re-elected.	▌ ✓ George E. Mitchell (Jacksonian) 53.2%; ▌James W. Williams (Unknown) 46.8%
Maryland 7	Richard Spencer	Jacksonian	1829	Incumbent lost re-election. National Republican gain.	▌ ✓ John Leeds Kerr (National Republican) 50.5%; ▌Richard Spencer (Jacksonian) 49.5%
Maryland 8	Ephraim King Wilson	Jacksonian	1829	Incumbent retired. National Republican gain.	▌ ✓ John S. Spence (National Republican) 92.21%; Scattering 7.79%

== Massachusetts ==
Former U.S. President John Quincy Adams was elected in Massachusetts's 11th district, becoming the first former president to re-enter public life after leaving the presidency.

Elections were held November 1, 1830, but at least one district went to so many ballots it failed to achieve a majority election until 1832, just before the next cycle began.

(District numbers differ between sources. District numbers below reflect Martis's references. Where noted, Congressional Quarterly's "Guide to U.S. Elections" has different district numbers.)

District	Incumbent			This race	
District	Member	Party	First elected	Results	Candidates
Massachusetts 1 (Suffolk)	Benjamin Gorham	National; Republican	1820 (special); 1822 (retired); 1827 (special)	Incumbent retired. National Republican hold.	▌ ✓ Nathan Appleton (National Republican) 57.44%; ▌Henry Lee (Independent) 42.56%
Massachusetts 2 (Essex–South)	Benjamin W. Crowninshield	National; Republican	1822	Incumbent lost re-election from a different party. National Republican hold.	▌ ✓ Rufus Choate (National Republican) 59.12%; ▌Benjamin W. Crowninshield (Jacksonian) 26.06%; Others 14.82%
Massachusetts 3 (Essex–North)	John Varnum	National; Republican	1824	Incumbent retired. New member elected late. National Republican hold.	First ballot (November 1, 1830): ▌Caleb Cushing (Independent) 34.31%; ▌John Merrill (National Republican) 26.23%; ▌Gayton P. Osgood (Jacksonian) 25.66%; ▌James H. Duncan (Unknown) 13.80%; Second ballot (January 3, 1831): ▌Caleb Cushing (National Republican) 42.94%; ▌Gayton P. Osgood (Jacksonian) 29.66%; ▌Stephen W. Marston (Independent) 27.40%; Third ballot (April 4, 1831): ▌Caleb Cushing (National Republican) 43.88%; ▌Gayton P. Osgood (Jacksonian) 32.40%; ▌Stephen W. Marston (Independent) 23.72%; Fourth ballot (June 27, 1831): ▌Caleb Cushing (National Republican) 43.07%; ▌Gayton P. Osgood (Jacksonian) 29.54%; ▌Joseph Kitteridge (Unknown) 27.39%; Fifth ballot (September 5, 1831): ▌Caleb Cushing (National Republican) 39.93%; ▌Joseph Kitteridge (Unknown) 31.99%; ▌Gayton P. Osgood (Jacksonian) 28.08%; Sixth ballot (November 14, 1831): ▌Caleb Cushing (National Republican) 40.53%; ▌Joseph Kitteridge (Unknown) 31.20%; ▌Gayton P. Osgood (Jacksonian) 28.28%; Seventh ballot (January 16, 1832): ▌Caleb Cushing (National Republican) 43.92%; ▌Joseph Kitteridge (Unknown) 28.82%; ▌Gayton P. Osgood (Jacksonian) 27.26%; Eighth ballot (February 13, 1832): ▌Caleb Cushing (National Republican) 40.84%; ▌Joseph Kitteridge (Unknown) 33.12%; ▌Gayton P. Osgood (Jacksonian) 26.04%; Ninth ballot (March 12, 1832): ▌Joseph Kitteridge (Unknown) 40.22%; ▌Caleb Cushing (National Republican) 36.75%; ▌Gayton P. Osgood (Jacksonian) 26.62%; Tenth ballot (April 9, 1832): ▌Joseph Kitteridge (Unknown) 47.18%; ▌Caleb Cushing (National Republican) 41.19%; Scattering 11.63%; Eleventh ballot (May 14, 1832): ▌Joseph Kitteridge (Unknown) 49.01%; ▌Gayton P. Osgood (Jacksonian) 41.09%; ▌Caleb Cushing (National Republican) 9.9%; Twelfth ballot (September 3, 1832): ▌Joseph Kitteridge (Unknown) 39.01%; ▌Gayton P. Osgood (Jacksonian) 31.40%; ▌Caleb Cushing (National Republican) 29.59%; Thirteenth ballot (November 12, 1832): ▌ ✓ Jeremiah Nelson (National Republican) 63.65%; ▌Gayton P. Osgood (Democratic) 36.35%
Massachusetts 4 (Middlesex)	Edward Everett	National; Republican	1824	Incumbent re-elected.	▌ ✓ Edward Everett (National Republican) 83.60%; ▌James Russell (Jacksonian) 16.40%
Massachusetts 5 (Worcester–South) CQGuide: 13th	John Davis	National; Republican	1824	Incumbent re-elected.	▌ ✓ John Davis (National Republican) 72.69%; ▌Dana Thurber (Jacksonian) 21.54%; Scattering 5.77%
Massachusetts 6 (Worcester–North) CQGuide: 5th	Joseph G. Kendall	National; Republican	1828	Incumbent re-elected.	▌ ✓ Joseph G. Kendall (National Republican) Uncontested
Massachusetts 7 (Franklin) CQGuide: 6th	George Grennell Jr.	National; Republican	1828	Incumbent re-elected.	▌ ✓ George Grennell Jr. (National Republican) 72.4%; ▌Israel Billings (Unknown) 25.22%
Massachusetts 8 (Hampden)	Isaac C. Bates	National; Republican	1826	Incumbent re-elected.	▌ ✓ Isaac C. Bates (National Republican) 79.54%; ▌John Mills (Jacksonian) 20.46%
Massachusetts 9 (Berkshire) CQGuide: 7th	Henry W. Dwight	National; Republican	1820	Incumbent lost re-election. National Republican hold.	▌ ✓ George N. Briggs (National Republican) 61.98%; ▌Nathan Willis (Jacksonian) 29.96%; ▌Henry W. Dwight (National Republican) 8.06%
Massachusetts 10 (Norfolk) CQGuide: 9th	John Bailey	National; Republican	1823 (special); 1824 (disqualified); 1824 (special)	Incumbent retired. National Republican hold.	▌ ✓ Henry A. Dearborn (National Republican) 58.52%; ▌Moses Thatcher (Anti-Masonic) 34.01%; ▌Abel Cushing (Jacksonian) 7.47%
Massachusetts 11 (Plymouth) CQGuide: 12th	Joseph Richardson	National; Republican	1826	Incumbent retired. National Republican hold.	▌ ✓ John Quincy Adams (National Republican) 71.98%; ▌Ara Thompson (Jacksonian) 15.02%; ▌William Baylies (Unknown) 13%
Massachusetts 12 (Bristol) CQGuide: 10th	James L. Hodges	National; Republican	1827	Incumbent re-elected late on the seventh ballot	First ballot (November 1, 1830): ▌Russel Freeman (National Republican) 42.48%; ▌Micah B. Ruggles (Anti-Masonic) 28.9%; ▌James L. Hodges (National Republican) 17.51%; ▌Francis Baylies (Jacksonian) 11.10%; Second ballot (January 3, 1831): ▌Micah B. Ruggles (Anti-Masonic) 48.08%; ▌James L. Hodges (National Republican) 44.01%; ▌John A. Parker (Unknown) 7.91%; Third ballot (April 4, 1831): ▌Micah B. Ruggles (Anti-Masonic) 49.73%; ▌James L. Hodges (National Republican) 47.84%; ▌William Reed (Unknown) 2.44%; Fourth ballot (June 27, 1831): ▌Micah B. Ruggles (Anti-Masonic) 49.65%; ▌James L. Hodges (National Republican) 47.4%; Scattering 2.95%; Fifth ballot (September 5, 1831): ▌James L. Hodges (National Republican) 49.7%; ▌Micah B. Ruggles (Anti-Masonic) 46.44%; Scattering 3.86%; Sixth ballot (November 14, 1831): ▌James L. Hodges (National Republican) 49.60%; ▌Micah B. Ruggles (Anti-Masonic) 48.11%; Scattering 2.29%; Seventh ballot (January 16, 1832): ▌ ✓ James L. Hodges (National Republican) 51.58%; ▌Micah B. Ruggles (Anti-Masonic) 48.42%
Massachusetts 13 (Barnstable) CQGuide: 11th	John Reed Jr.	National; Republican	1812; 1816 (lost); 1820	Incumbent re-elected.	▌ ✓ John Reed Jr. (National Republican) Uncontested

== Mississippi ==
Elections held early, from August 2 to 3, 1830

District	Incumbent			This race	
District	Member	Party	First elected	Results	Candidates
Mississippi at-large	Thomas Hinds	Jacksonian	1828 (special)	Incumbent retired. Jacksonian hold.	▌ ✓ Franklin E. Plummer (Jacksonian) 35.21%; ▌David Dickson (Jacksonian) 22.05%; ▌James C. Wilkins (Jacksonian) 17.82%; ▌William L. Sharkey (National Republican) 11.82%; ▌John H. Norton (National Republican) 11.78%; ▌Richard W. Webber (Jacksonian) 1.34%

== Missouri ==
Missouri elected its sole member late on August 2, 1831.

District	Incumbent			This race	
District	Member	Party	First elected	Results	Candidates
Missouri at-large	Spencer Pettis	Jacksonian	1828	Incumbent re-elected.	▌ ✓ Spencer Pettis (Jacksonian) 62.26%; ▌David Barton (National Republican) 37.74%

== New Hampshire ==
New Hampshire elected its six members at-large late on March 8, 1831.

District	Incumbent			This race	
District	Member	Party	First elected	Results	Candidates
New Hampshire at-large 6 seats on a general ticket	John Brodhead	Jacksonian	1829	Incumbent re-elected.	▌ ✓ Thomas Chandler (Jacksonian) 9.2%; ▌ ✓ Joseph Hammons (Jacksonian) 9.2%; ▌ ✓ John Brodhead (Jacksonian) 9.2%; ▌ ✓ Henry Hubbard (Jacksonian) 9.1%; ▌ ✓ Joseph M. Harper (Jacksonian) 9.1%; ▌ ✓ John W. Weeks (Jacksonian) 9.0%; ▌Anthony Colby (National Republican) 7.6%; ▌Daniel Adams (National Republican) 7.6%; ▌Joseph Bell (National Republican) 7.6%; ▌John F. Parrott (National Republican) 7.6%; ▌David Barker Jr. (National Republican) 7.5%; ▌James Wilson II (National Republican) 7.4%
New Hampshire at-large 6 seats on a general ticket	Thomas Chandler	Jacksonian	1829	Incumbent re-elected.	▌ ✓ Thomas Chandler (Jacksonian) 9.2%; ▌ ✓ Joseph Hammons (Jacksonian) 9.2%; ▌ ✓ John Brodhead (Jacksonian) 9.2%; ▌ ✓ Henry Hubbard (Jacksonian) 9.1%; ▌ ✓ Joseph M. Harper (Jacksonian) 9.1%; ▌ ✓ John W. Weeks (Jacksonian) 9.0%; ▌Anthony Colby (National Republican) 7.6%; ▌Daniel Adams (National Republican) 7.6%; ▌Joseph Bell (National Republican) 7.6%; ▌John F. Parrott (National Republican) 7.6%; ▌David Barker Jr. (National Republican) 7.5%; ▌James Wilson II (National Republican) 7.4%
New Hampshire at-large 6 seats on a general ticket	Joseph Hammons	Jacksonian	1829	Incumbent re-elected.	▌ ✓ Thomas Chandler (Jacksonian) 9.2%; ▌ ✓ Joseph Hammons (Jacksonian) 9.2%; ▌ ✓ John Brodhead (Jacksonian) 9.2%; ▌ ✓ Henry Hubbard (Jacksonian) 9.1%; ▌ ✓ Joseph M. Harper (Jacksonian) 9.1%; ▌ ✓ John W. Weeks (Jacksonian) 9.0%; ▌Anthony Colby (National Republican) 7.6%; ▌Daniel Adams (National Republican) 7.6%; ▌Joseph Bell (National Republican) 7.6%; ▌John F. Parrott (National Republican) 7.6%; ▌David Barker Jr. (National Republican) 7.5%; ▌James Wilson II (National Republican) 7.4%
New Hampshire at-large 6 seats on a general ticket	Jonathan Harvey	Jacksonian	1824	Incumbent retired. New member elected. Jacksonian hold.	▌ ✓ Thomas Chandler (Jacksonian) 9.2%; ▌ ✓ Joseph Hammons (Jacksonian) 9.2%; ▌ ✓ John Brodhead (Jacksonian) 9.2%; ▌ ✓ Henry Hubbard (Jacksonian) 9.1%; ▌ ✓ Joseph M. Harper (Jacksonian) 9.1%; ▌ ✓ John W. Weeks (Jacksonian) 9.0%; ▌Anthony Colby (National Republican) 7.6%; ▌Daniel Adams (National Republican) 7.6%; ▌Joseph Bell (National Republican) 7.6%; ▌John F. Parrott (National Republican) 7.6%; ▌David Barker Jr. (National Republican) 7.5%; ▌James Wilson II (National Republican) 7.4%
New Hampshire at-large 6 seats on a general ticket	Henry Hubbard	Jacksonian	1829	Incumbent re-elected.	▌ ✓ Thomas Chandler (Jacksonian) 9.2%; ▌ ✓ Joseph Hammons (Jacksonian) 9.2%; ▌ ✓ John Brodhead (Jacksonian) 9.2%; ▌ ✓ Henry Hubbard (Jacksonian) 9.1%; ▌ ✓ Joseph M. Harper (Jacksonian) 9.1%; ▌ ✓ John W. Weeks (Jacksonian) 9.0%; ▌Anthony Colby (National Republican) 7.6%; ▌Daniel Adams (National Republican) 7.6%; ▌Joseph Bell (National Republican) 7.6%; ▌John F. Parrott (National Republican) 7.6%; ▌David Barker Jr. (National Republican) 7.5%; ▌James Wilson II (National Republican) 7.4%
New Hampshire at-large 6 seats on a general ticket	John W. Weeks	Jacksonian	1829	Incumbent re-elected.	▌ ✓ Thomas Chandler (Jacksonian) 9.2%; ▌ ✓ Joseph Hammons (Jacksonian) 9.2%; ▌ ✓ John Brodhead (Jacksonian) 9.2%; ▌ ✓ Henry Hubbard (Jacksonian) 9.1%; ▌ ✓ Joseph M. Harper (Jacksonian) 9.1%; ▌ ✓ John W. Weeks (Jacksonian) 9.0%; ▌Anthony Colby (National Republican) 7.6%; ▌Daniel Adams (National Republican) 7.6%; ▌Joseph Bell (National Republican) 7.6%; ▌John F. Parrott (National Republican) 7.6%; ▌David Barker Jr. (National Republican) 7.5%; ▌James Wilson II (National Republican) 7.4%

== New Jersey ==
New Jersey elected its six members at-large on November 6, 1830.

District	Incumbent			This race	
District	Member	Party	First elected	Results	Candidates
New Jersey at-large 6 seats on a general ticket	Isaac Pierson	National; Republican	1826	Incumbent lost renomination. National Republican hold.	▌ ✓ Silas Condit (National Republican) 8.8%; ▌ ✓ Thomas H. Hughes (National Republican) 8.8%; ▌ ✓ Richard M. Cooper (National Republican) 8.7%; ▌ ✓ Isaac Southard (National Republican) 8.7%; ▌ ✓ Lewis Condict (National Republican) 8.6%; ▌ ✓ James F. Randolph (National Republican) 8.4%; ▌James Parker (Jacksonian) 8.2%; ▌Alexander Wurts (Jacksonian) 8.1%; ▌John W. Mickle (Jacksonian) 8.1%; ▌Samuel Fowler (Jacksonian) 8.0%; ▌John Travers (Jacksonian) 8.0%; ▌William N. Jeffers (Jacksonian) 7.6%
New Jersey at-large 6 seats on a general ticket	Richard M. Cooper	National; Republican	1828	Incumbent re-elected.	▌ ✓ Silas Condit (National Republican) 8.8%; ▌ ✓ Thomas H. Hughes (National Republican) 8.8%; ▌ ✓ Richard M. Cooper (National Republican) 8.7%; ▌ ✓ Isaac Southard (National Republican) 8.7%; ▌ ✓ Lewis Condict (National Republican) 8.6%; ▌ ✓ James F. Randolph (National Republican) 8.4%; ▌James Parker (Jacksonian) 8.2%; ▌Alexander Wurts (Jacksonian) 8.1%; ▌John W. Mickle (Jacksonian) 8.1%; ▌Samuel Fowler (Jacksonian) 8.0%; ▌John Travers (Jacksonian) 8.0%; ▌William N. Jeffers (Jacksonian) 7.6%
New Jersey at-large 6 seats on a general ticket	James F. Randolph	National; Republican	1828 (special)	Incumbent re-elected.	▌ ✓ Silas Condit (National Republican) 8.8%; ▌ ✓ Thomas H. Hughes (National Republican) 8.8%; ▌ ✓ Richard M. Cooper (National Republican) 8.7%; ▌ ✓ Isaac Southard (National Republican) 8.7%; ▌ ✓ Lewis Condict (National Republican) 8.6%; ▌ ✓ James F. Randolph (National Republican) 8.4%; ▌James Parker (Jacksonian) 8.2%; ▌Alexander Wurts (Jacksonian) 8.1%; ▌John W. Mickle (Jacksonian) 8.1%; ▌Samuel Fowler (Jacksonian) 8.0%; ▌John Travers (Jacksonian) 8.0%; ▌William N. Jeffers (Jacksonian) 7.6%
New Jersey at-large 6 seats on a general ticket	Thomas H. Hughes	National; Republican	1828	Incumbent re-elected.	▌ ✓ Silas Condit (National Republican) 8.8%; ▌ ✓ Thomas H. Hughes (National Republican) 8.8%; ▌ ✓ Richard M. Cooper (National Republican) 8.7%; ▌ ✓ Isaac Southard (National Republican) 8.7%; ▌ ✓ Lewis Condict (National Republican) 8.6%; ▌ ✓ James F. Randolph (National Republican) 8.4%; ▌James Parker (Jacksonian) 8.2%; ▌Alexander Wurts (Jacksonian) 8.1%; ▌John W. Mickle (Jacksonian) 8.1%; ▌Samuel Fowler (Jacksonian) 8.0%; ▌John Travers (Jacksonian) 8.0%; ▌William N. Jeffers (Jacksonian) 7.6%
New Jersey at-large 6 seats on a general ticket	Samuel Swan	National; Republican	1820	Incumbent retired. National Republican hold.	▌ ✓ Silas Condit (National Republican) 8.8%; ▌ ✓ Thomas H. Hughes (National Republican) 8.8%; ▌ ✓ Richard M. Cooper (National Republican) 8.7%; ▌ ✓ Isaac Southard (National Republican) 8.7%; ▌ ✓ Lewis Condict (National Republican) 8.6%; ▌ ✓ James F. Randolph (National Republican) 8.4%; ▌James Parker (Jacksonian) 8.2%; ▌Alexander Wurts (Jacksonian) 8.1%; ▌John W. Mickle (Jacksonian) 8.1%; ▌Samuel Fowler (Jacksonian) 8.0%; ▌John Travers (Jacksonian) 8.0%; ▌William N. Jeffers (Jacksonian) 7.6%
New Jersey at-large 6 seats on a general ticket	Lewis Condict	National; Republican	1821 (special)	Incumbent re-elected.	▌ ✓ Silas Condit (National Republican) 8.8%; ▌ ✓ Thomas H. Hughes (National Republican) 8.8%; ▌ ✓ Richard M. Cooper (National Republican) 8.7%; ▌ ✓ Isaac Southard (National Republican) 8.7%; ▌ ✓ Lewis Condict (National Republican) 8.6%; ▌ ✓ James F. Randolph (National Republican) 8.4%; ▌James Parker (Jacksonian) 8.2%; ▌Alexander Wurts (Jacksonian) 8.1%; ▌John W. Mickle (Jacksonian) 8.1%; ▌Samuel Fowler (Jacksonian) 8.0%; ▌John Travers (Jacksonian) 8.0%; ▌William N. Jeffers (Jacksonian) 7.6%

== New York ==
New York elected its 34 members from November 1 to 3, 1830.

District	Incumbent			This race	
District	Member	Party	First elected	Results	Candidates
New York 1	James Lent	Jacksonian	1828	Incumbent re-elected.	▌ ✓ James Lent (Jacksonian) 54.46%; ▌John A. King (National Republican) 45.54%
New York 2	Jacob Crocheron	Jacksonian	1828	Incumbent retired. Jacksonian hold.	▌ ✓ John T. Bergen (Jacksonian) 50.36%; ▌John Wyckoff (National Republican) 49.64%
New York 3 3 seats on a general ticket	Churchill C. Cambreleng	Jacksonian	1821	Incumbent re-elected.	▌ ✓ Churchill C. Cambreleng (Jacksonian) 17.8%; ▌ ✓ Campbell P. White (Jacksonian) 17.5%; ▌ ✓ Gulian C. Verplanck (Jacksonian) 17.5%; ▌Abraham Lawrence (National Republican) 12.3%; ▌Thomas R. Smith (National Republican) 12.0%; ▌Adoniram Chandler (National Republican) 11.9%; ▌Thomas Hertell (Working Men's) 3.6%; ▌John Frazee (Working Men's) 3.5%; ▌Isaac Pierce (Working Men's) 3.4%; ▌Thomas Skidmore (Agrarian) 0.19%; ▌Alden Porter (Agrarian) 0.19%; ▌John Tuthill (Agrarian) 0.18%
New York 3 3 seats on a general ticket	Campbell P. White	Jacksonian	1828	Incumbent re-elected.	▌ ✓ Churchill C. Cambreleng (Jacksonian) 17.8%; ▌ ✓ Campbell P. White (Jacksonian) 17.5%; ▌ ✓ Gulian C. Verplanck (Jacksonian) 17.5%; ▌Abraham Lawrence (National Republican) 12.3%; ▌Thomas R. Smith (National Republican) 12.0%; ▌Adoniram Chandler (National Republican) 11.9%; ▌Thomas Hertell (Working Men's) 3.6%; ▌John Frazee (Working Men's) 3.5%; ▌Isaac Pierce (Working Men's) 3.4%; ▌Thomas Skidmore (Agrarian) 0.19%; ▌Alden Porter (Agrarian) 0.19%; ▌John Tuthill (Agrarian) 0.18%
New York 3 3 seats on a general ticket	Gulian C. Verplanck	Jacksonian	1824	Incumbent re-elected.	▌ ✓ Churchill C. Cambreleng (Jacksonian) 17.8%; ▌ ✓ Campbell P. White (Jacksonian) 17.5%; ▌ ✓ Gulian C. Verplanck (Jacksonian) 17.5%; ▌Abraham Lawrence (National Republican) 12.3%; ▌Thomas R. Smith (National Republican) 12.0%; ▌Adoniram Chandler (National Republican) 11.9%; ▌Thomas Hertell (Working Men's) 3.6%; ▌John Frazee (Working Men's) 3.5%; ▌Isaac Pierce (Working Men's) 3.4%; ▌Thomas Skidmore (Agrarian) 0.19%; ▌Alden Porter (Agrarian) 0.19%; ▌John Tuthill (Agrarian) 0.18%
New York 4	Henry B. Cowles	National; Republican	1828	Incumbent retired. Jacksonian gain.	▌ ✓ Aaron Ward (Jacksonian) 53.58%; ▌John Hunter (National Republican) 31.58%; ▌Jonathan Ferris (Anti-Masonic) 14.83%
New York 5	Abraham Bockee	Jacksonian	1828	Incumbent lost renomination. National Republican gain.	▌ ✓ Edmund H. Pendleton (National Republican) 52.28%; ▌Stoddard Judd (Jacksonian) 47.72%
New York 6	Vacant			Rep. Hector Craig (J) resigned July 12, 1830. National Republican gain.	▌ ✓ Samuel J. Wilkin (National Republican) 50.86%; ▌Isaac R. Van Duzer (Jacksonian) 49.14%
New York 7	Charles G. DeWitt	Jacksonian	1828	Incumbent retired. Jacksonian hold.	▌ ✓ John C. Brodhead (Jacksonian) 59.7%; ▌Thomas S. Lockwood (National Republican) 40.3%
New York 8	James Strong	National; Republican	1822	Incumbent retired. Jacksonian gain.	▌ ✓ John King (Jacksonian) 56.8%; ▌Robert L. Livingston (National Republican) 43.2%
New York 9	John D. Dickinson	National; Republican	1826	Incumbent lost re-election. Jacksonian gain.	▌ ✓ Job Pierson (Jacksonian) 59.33%; ▌John D. Dickinson (National Republican) 40.67%
New York 10	Ambrose Spencer	National; Republican	1828	Incumbent lost re-election. Jacksonian gain.	▌ ✓ Gerrit Y. Lansing (Jacksonian) 52.95%; ▌Ambrose Spencer (National Republican) 47.05%
New York 11	Perkins King	Jacksonian	1828	Incumbent retired. Jacksonian hold.	▌ ✓ Erastus Root (Jacksonian) 60.99%; ▌Isaac Ogden (Anti-Masonic) 39.01%
New York 12	Peter I. Borst	Jacksonian	1828	Incumbent retired. Jacksonian hold.	▌ ✓ Joseph Bouck (Jacksonian) 64.9%; ▌Peter W. Mann (Anti-Masonic) 35.1%
New York 13	William G. Angel	Jacksonian	1828	Incumbent re-elected.	▌ ✓ William G. Angel (Jacksonian) 50.93%; ▌Horace Lathrop (Anti-Masonic) 49.07%
New York 14	Henry R. Storrs	National; Republican	1822	Incumbent retired. Jacksonian gain.	▌ ✓ Samuel Beardsley (Jacksonian) 57.29%; ▌Simon N. Dexter (Anti-Masonic) 40.12%; ▌Fortune C. White (Working Men's) 2.59%
New York 15	Michael Hoffman	Jacksonian	1824	Incumbent re-elected.	▌ ✓ Michael Hoffman (Jacksonian) 60.71%; ▌Hiram Nolton (Anti-Masonic) 39.29%
New York 16	Benedict Arnold	National; Republican	1828	Incumbent retired. Jacksonian gain.	▌ ✓ Nathan Soule (Jacksonian) 52.71%; ▌Daniel Cady (National Republican) 47.29%
New York 17	John W. Taylor	National; Republican	1812	Incumbent re-elected.	▌ ✓ John W. Taylor (National Republican) 41.99%; ▌Samuel Young (Jacksonian) 38%; ▌David Garnsey (Anti-Masonic) 20.01%
New York 18	Henry C. Martindale	National; Republican	1822	Incumbent lost re-election. Jacksonian gain.	▌ ✓ Nathaniel Pitcher (Jacksonian) 52.48%; ▌Henry C. Martindale (National Republican) 47.52%
New York 19	Isaac Finch	National; Republican	1828	Incumbent retired. Jacksonian gain.	▌ ✓ William Hogan (Jacksonian) 52.49%; ▌Luther Bradish (National Republican) 26.72%; ▌Thomas D. Gilson (Anti-Masonic) 20.79%
New York 20 2 seats on a general ticket	Joseph Hawkins	National; Republican	1828	Incumbent retired. Jacksonian gain.	▌ ✓ Daniel Wardwell (Jacksonian) 30.0%; ▌ ✓ Charles Dayan (Jacksonian) 29.7%; ▌Chester Buck (Anti-Masonic) 20.4%; ▌George Fisher (Anti-Masonic) 20.0%
New York 20 2 seats on a general ticket	Vacant			Rep. George Fisher (NR) resigned February 5, 1830 following election contest. Jacksonian gain.	▌ ✓ Daniel Wardwell (Jacksonian) 30.0%; ▌ ✓ Charles Dayan (Jacksonian) 29.7%; ▌Chester Buck (Anti-Masonic) 20.4%; ▌George Fisher (Anti-Masonic) 20.0%
New York 21	Vacant			Rep. Robert Monell (J) resigned February 21, 1831 to become judge of the Sixth State Circuit Court. Anti-Masonic gain.	▌ ✓ John A. Collier (Anti-Masonic) 58.92%; ▌Abial Cook (Jacksonian) 41.08%
New York 22	Thomas Beekman	National; Republican	1828	Incumbent retired. Jacksonian gain.	▌ ✓ Edward C. Reed (Jacksonian) 51.66%; ▌Eleazer W. Edgecomb (Anti-Masonic) 48.34%
New York 23	Jonas Earll Jr.	Jacksonian	1826	Incumbent retired. Jacksonian hold.	▌ ✓ Freeborn G. Jewett (Jacksonian) 62.37%; ▌William Jerome (National Republican) 37.63%
New York 24	Gershom Powers	Jacksonian	1828	Incumbent retired. Jacksonian hold.	▌ ✓ Ulysses F. Doubleday (Jacksonian) 50.1%; ▌Josiah Hopkins (Anti-Masonic) 46.75%; ▌Ephraim C. Marsh (Independent) 3.15%
New York 25	Thomas Maxwell	Jacksonian	1828	Incumbent retired. Anti-Masonic gain.	▌ ✓ Gamaliel H. Barstow (Anti-Masonic) 51.24%; ▌Charles Humphrey (Jacksonian) 48.76%
New York 26 2 seats on a general ticket	Jehiel H. Halsey	Jacksonian	1828	Incumbent lost re-election. Anti-Masonic gain.	▌ ✓ John Dickson (Anti-Masonic) 28.7%; ▌ ✓ William Babcock (Anti-Masonic) 28.2%; ▌Jared Wilson (Jacksonian) 21.7%; ▌Jehiel H. Halsey (Jacksonian) 21.5%
New York 26 2 seats on a general ticket	Robert S. Rose	Anti-Masonic	1828	Incumbent retired. Anti-Masonic hold.	▌ ✓ John Dickson (Anti-Masonic) 28.7%; ▌ ✓ William Babcock (Anti-Masonic) 28.2%; ▌Jared Wilson (Jacksonian) 21.7%; ▌Jehiel H. Halsey (Jacksonian) 21.5%
New York 27	Timothy Childs	Anti-Masonic	1828	Incumbent retired. Anti-Masonic hold.	▌ ✓ Frederick Whittlesey (Anti-Masonic) 65.83%; ▌Calvin H. Bryan (Jacksonian) 34.17%
New York 28	John Magee	Jacksonian	1826	Incumbent lost re-election. Anti-Masonic gain.	▌ ✓ Grattan H. Wheeler (Anti-Masonic) 54.53%; ▌John Magee (Jacksonian) 45.47%
New York 29	Phineas L. Tracy	Anti-Masonic	1827 (special)	Incumbent re-elected.	▌ ✓ Phineas L. Tracy (Anti-Masonic) 68.89%; ▌Isaac Wilson (Jacksonian) 31.11%
New York 30	Ebenezer F. Norton	Jacksonian	1828	Incumbent lost re-election. Anti-Masonic gain.	▌ ✓ Bates Cooke (Anti-Masonic) 69.64%; ▌Ebenezer F. Norton (Jacksonian) 26.93%; ▌Thomas B. Campbell (National Republican) 3.43%

== North Carolina ==
North Carolina elected its members August 11, 1831, after the term began but before the new Congress convened.

District	Incumbent			This race	
District	Member	Party	First elected	Results	Candidates
North Carolina 1	William B. Shepard	National; Republican	1829	Incumbent re-elected.	▌ ✓ William B. Shepard (National Republican) 61.88%; ▌John H. Wheeler (Jacksonian) 38.12%
North Carolina 2	John Branch	Jacksonian	1831 (Note: Incumbent first elected in special election and first seated in the 22nd United States Congress on May 12, 1831.)	Incumbent re-elected.	▌ ✓ John Branch (Jacksonian) 100%
North Carolina 3	Thomas H. Hall	Jacksonian	1827	Incumbent re-elected.	▌ ✓ Thomas H. Hall (Jacksonian) 55.59%; ▌Joseph R. Lloyd (National Republican) 44.41%
North Carolina 4	Jesse Speight	Jacksonian	1829	Incumbent re-elected.	▌ ✓ Jesse Speight (Jacksonian) 100%
North Carolina 5	Edward Bishop Dudley	Jacksonian	1829	Incumbent retired. Jacksonian hold.	▌ ✓ James I. McKay (Jacksonian) 100%
North Carolina 6	Robert Porter	Jacksonian	1829	Incumbent re-elected.	▌ ✓ Robert Porter (Jacksonian) 100%
North Carolina 7	Edmund Deberry	National; Republican	1829	Incumbent lost re-election. Jacksonian gain.	▌ ✓ Lauchlin Bethune (Jacksonian) 50.30%; ▌Edmund Deberry (National Republican) 49.70%
North Carolina 8	Daniel Barringer	Jacksonian	1826	Incumbent re-elected.	▌ ✓ Daniel Barringer (Jacksonian) 100%
North Carolina 9	Augustine H. Shepperd	Jacksonian	1827	Incumbent re-elected.	▌ ✓ Augustine H. Shepperd (Jacksonian) 100%
North Carolina 10	Abraham Rencher	Jacksonian	1829	Incumbent re-elected.	▌ ✓ Abraham Rencher (Jacksonian) 100%
North Carolina 11	Henry W. Connor	Jacksonian	1821	Incumbent re-elected.	▌ ✓ Henry W. Connor (Jacksonian) 58.20%; ▌Bartlett Shipp (National Republican) 41.80%
North Carolina 12	Samuel P. Carson	Jacksonian	1825	Incumbent re-elected.	▌ ✓ Samuel P. Carson (Jacksonian) 76.54%; ▌Anthony Casey (National Republican) 23.46%
North Carolina 13	Lewis Williams	National; Republican	1815	Incumbent re-elected.	▌ ✓ Lewis Williams (National Republican); ▌H. Casey (Unknown) (Note: Data incomplete.)

== Ohio ==
District	Incumbent			This race	
District	Member	Party	First elected	Results	Candidates
Ohio 1	James Findlay	Jacksonian	1824	Incumbent re-elected.	▌ ✓ James Findlay (Jacksonian) 57.16%; ▌Joseph Benham (National Republican) 42.84%
Ohio 2	James Shields	Jacksonian	1828	Incumbent lost re-election. National Republican gain.	▌ ✓ Thomas Corwin (National Republican) 57.56%; ▌James Shields (Jacksonian) 42.44%
Ohio 3	Joseph H. Crane	National Republican	1828	Incumbent re-elected.	▌ ✓ Joseph H. Crane (National Republican) 47.44%; ▌Robert Young (Jacksonian) 28.48%; ▌Robert J. Skinner (Jacksonian) 24.08%
Ohio 4	Joseph Vance	National Republican	1820 (Note: Redistricted from the 5th district in 1822.)	Incumbent re-elected.	▌ ✓ Joseph Vance (National Republican) 100%
Ohio 5	William Russell	Jacksonian	1826	Incumbent re-elected.	▌ ✓ William Russell (Jacksonian) 53.68%; ▌Isaiah Morris (National Republican) 33.74%; ▌Samuel H. Hale (National Republican) 12.58%
Ohio 6	William Creighton Jr.	National Republican	1828	Incumbent re-elected.	▌ ✓ William Creighton Jr. (National Republican) 54.21%; ▌Valentine Keffer (Jacksonian Party) 45.79%
Ohio 7	Samuel F. Vinton	National Republican	1822	Incumbent re-elected.	▌ ✓ Samuel F. Vinton (National Republican) 74.26%; ▌Joseph Barker (Jacksonian) 25.74%
Ohio 8	William Stanbery	Jacksonian	1827	Incumbent re-elected as a National Republican. National Republican gain.	▌ ✓ William Stanbery (National Republican) 53.96%; ▌Nathaniel McLean (Jacksonian) 46.04%
Ohio 9	William W. Irvin	Jacksonian	1828	Incumbent re-elected.	▌ ✓ William W. Irvin (Jacksonian) 100%
Ohio 10	William Kennon Sr.	National Republican	1828	Incumbent re-elected.	▌ ✓ William Kennon Sr. (National Republican) 63.19%; ▌Thomas Weston (Jacksonian) 36.81%
Ohio 11	Humphrey H. Leavitt	Jacksonian	1830 (Note: Initially elected to fill a vacant seat prior to the general election.)	Incumbent re-elected.	▌ ✓ Humphrey H. Leavitt (Jacksonian) 53.11%; ▌ Samuel Stokely (National Republican) 46.89%
Ohio 12	John Thomson	Jacksonian	1828	Incumbent re-elected.	▌ ✓ John Thomson (Jacksonian) 64.36%; ▌John Harris (National Republican) 35.64%
Ohio 13	Elisha Whittlesey	National Republican	1822	Incumbent re-elected.	▌ ✓ Elisha Whittlesey (National Republican) 43.44%; ▌Jonathan Sloane (Anti-Masonic) 35.72%; ▌William Rayen (Jacksonian) 20.83%
Ohio 14	Mordecai Bartley	National Republican	1822	Incumbent retired. National Republican hold.	▌ ✓ Eleutheros Cooke (National Republican) 39.15%; ▌William Patterson (Jacksonian) 31.01%; ▌Leonard Case (National Republican) 29.84%

== Pennsylvania ==
District	Incumbent			This race	
District	Member	Party	First elected	Results	Candidates (Note: For plural districts, percent is based on assumption that each voter cast as many votes as there are seats.)
Pennsylvania 1	Joel B. Sutherland	Jacksonian	1826	Incumbent re-elected.	▌ ✓ Joel B. Sutherland (Jacksonian) 66.2%; ▌Stephen Simpson (National Republican) 33.8%
Pennsylvania 2	Joseph Hemphill	Jacksonian	1800; 1802 (lost); 1818; 1826 (resigned); 1828	Incumbent retired. Jacksonian hold.	▌ ✓ Henry Horn (Jacksonian) 55.6%; ▌Daniel W. Coxe (National Republican) 44.4%
Pennsylvania 3	Daniel H. Miller	Jacksonian	1822	Incumbent lost-re-election. National Republican gain.	▌ ✓ John G. Watmough (National Republican) 54.1%; ▌Daniel H. Miller (Jacksonian) 45.9%
Pennsylvania 4 3 seats on a general ticket	James Buchanan	Jacksonian	1820	Incumbent retired. Anti-Masonic gain.	▌ ✓ William Hiester (Anti-Masonic) 52.4%; ▌ ✓ Joshua Evans Jr. (Jacksonian) 50.4%; ▌ ✓ David Potts Jr. (Anti-Masonic) 49.1%; ▌Edward Darlington (Anti-Masonic) 49.0%; ▌Samuel Boyd (Jacksonian) 47.3%; ▌Archibald T. Dick (Jacksonian) 37.1%; ▌Samuel Edwards (Jacksonian) 14.6%
Pennsylvania 4 3 seats on a general ticket	Joshua Evans Jr.	Jacksonian	1828	Incumbent re-elected.	▌ ✓ William Hiester (Anti-Masonic) 52.4%; ▌ ✓ Joshua Evans Jr. (Jacksonian) 50.4%; ▌ ✓ David Potts Jr. (Anti-Masonic) 49.1%; ▌Edward Darlington (Anti-Masonic) 49.0%; ▌Samuel Boyd (Jacksonian) 47.3%; ▌Archibald T. Dick (Jacksonian) 37.1%; ▌Samuel Edwards (Jacksonian) 14.6%
Pennsylvania 4 3 seats on a general ticket	George G. Leiper	Jacksonian	1828	Incumbent retired. Anti-Masonic gain.	▌ ✓ William Hiester (Anti-Masonic) 52.4%; ▌ ✓ Joshua Evans Jr. (Jacksonian) 50.4%; ▌ ✓ David Potts Jr. (Anti-Masonic) 49.1%; ▌Edward Darlington (Anti-Masonic) 49.0%; ▌Samuel Boyd (Jacksonian) 47.3%; ▌Archibald T. Dick (Jacksonian) 37.1%; ▌Samuel Edwards (Jacksonian) 14.6%
Pennsylvania 5	John B. Sterigere	Jacksonian	1826	Incumbent retired. Jacksonian hold.	▌ ✓ Joel K. Mann (Jacksonian) 56.4%; ▌John Freedly (Anti-Masonic) 43.6%
Pennsylvania 6	Innis Green	Jacksonian	1826	Incumbent retired. Jacksonian hold.	▌ ✓ John C. Bucher (Jacksonian) 54.4%; ▌Valentine Hummel (National Republican) 45.6%
Pennsylvania 7 2 seats on a general ticket	Joseph Fry Jr.	Jacksonian	1826	Incumbent retired. Jacksonian hold.	▌ ✓ Henry A. P. Muhlenberg (Jacksonian) 58.3%; ▌ ✓ Henry King (Jacksonian) 55.0%; ▌John Bentenman (Anti-Masonic) 44.2%; ▌Walter C. Livingston (Anti-Masonic) 42.5%
Pennsylvania 7 2 seats on a general ticket	Henry A. P. Muhlenberg	Jacksonian	1828	Incumbent re-elected.	▌ ✓ Henry A. P. Muhlenberg (Jacksonian) 58.3%; ▌ ✓ Henry King (Jacksonian) 55.0%; ▌John Bentenman (Anti-Masonic) 44.2%; ▌Walter C. Livingston (Anti-Masonic) 42.5%
Pennsylvania 8 2 seats on a general ticket	Peter Ihrie Jr.	Jacksonian	1829 (special)	Incumbent re-elected.	▌ ✓ Peter Ihrie Jr. (Jacksonian) 61.0%; ▌ ✓ Samuel A. Smith (Jacksonian) 48.1%; ▌Lewis A. Coryell (Jacksonian) 33.4%; ▌Christian J. Hutter (Jacksonian) 29.7%; ▌James M. Porter (National Republican) 18.4%; ▌Stephen Brock (National Republican) 9.4%
Pennsylvania 8 2 seats on a general ticket	Samuel A. Smith	Jacksonian	1829 (special)	Incumbent re-elected.	▌ ✓ Peter Ihrie Jr. (Jacksonian) 61.0%; ▌ ✓ Samuel A. Smith (Jacksonian) 48.1%; ▌Lewis A. Coryell (Jacksonian) 33.4%; ▌Christian J. Hutter (Jacksonian) 29.7%; ▌James M. Porter (National Republican) 18.4%; ▌Stephen Brock (National Republican) 9.4%
Pennsylvania 9 3 seats on a general ticket	Philander Stephens	Jacksonian	1828	Incumbent re-elected.	▌ ✓ Lewis Dewart (Jacksonian) (Note: Ran on joint Jacksonian/National Republican ticket.) 99.0%; ▌ ✓ Philander Stephens (Jacksonian) 69.6%; ▌ ✓ James Ford (Jacksonian) 68.4%; ▌John Burrows (National Republican) 32.3%; ▌George Walker (National Republican) 30.7%
Pennsylvania 9 3 seats on a general ticket	James Ford	Jacksonian	1828	Incumbent re-elected.	▌ ✓ Lewis Dewart (Jacksonian) 99.0%; ▌ ✓ Philander Stephens (Jacksonian) 69.6%; ▌ ✓ James Ford (Jacksonian) 68.4%; ▌John Burrows (National Republican) 32.3%; ▌George Walker (National Republican) 30.7%
Pennsylvania 9 3 seats on a general ticket	Alem Marr	Jacksonian	1828	Incumbent retired. Jacksonian hold.	▌ ✓ Lewis Dewart (Jacksonian) 99.0%; ▌ ✓ Philander Stephens (Jacksonian) 69.6%; ▌ ✓ James Ford (Jacksonian) 68.4%; ▌John Burrows (National Republican) 32.3%; ▌George Walker (National Republican) 30.7%
Pennsylvania 10	Adam King	Jacksonian	1826	Incumbent re-elected.	▌ ✓ Adam King (Jacksonian) 58.6%; ▌William McIlvine (National Republican) 41.4%
Pennsylvania 11 2 seats on a general ticket	Thomas H. Crawford	Jacksonian	1828	Incumbent re-elected.	▌ ✓ Thomas H. Crawford (Jacksonian) 60.1%; ▌ ✓ William Ramsey (Jacksonian) 59.2%; ▌Jacob Alter (Anti-Masonic) 40.5%; ▌Robert Smith (Anti-Masonic) 40.1%
Pennsylvania 11 2 seats on a general ticket	William Ramsey	Jacksonian	1826	Incumbent re-elected.	▌ ✓ Thomas H. Crawford (Jacksonian) 60.1%; ▌ ✓ William Ramsey (Jacksonian) 59.2%; ▌Jacob Alter (Anti-Masonic) 40.5%; ▌Robert Smith (Anti-Masonic) 40.1%
Pennsylvania 12	John Scott	Jacksonian	1828	Incumbent lost-re-election. Anti-Masonic gain.	▌ ✓ Robert Allison (Anti-Masonic) 55.1%; ▌John Scott (Jacksonian) 44.9%
Pennsylvania 13	Chauncey Forward	Jacksonian	1826	Incumbent retired. National Republican gain.	▌ ✓ George Burd (National Republican) 50.2%; ▌David Mann (Anti-Masonic) 48.5%; ▌Reynolds (Note: Source did not give full name) (Unknown) 1.3%
Pennsylvania 14	Thomas Irwin	Jacksonian	1828	Incumbent lost-re-election. Anti-Masonic gain.	▌ ✓ Andrew Stewart (Anti-Masonic) 54.3%; ▌Thomas Irwin (Jacksonian) 45.7%
Pennsylvania 15	William McCreery	Jacksonian	1828	Incumbent lost-re-election. Anti-Masonic gain.	▌ ✓ Thomas M. T. McKennan (Anti-Masonic) 52.1%; ▌William McCreery (Jacksonian) 47.9%
Pennsylvania 16 2 seats on a general ticket	Harmar Denny	Anti-Masonic	1829 (special)	Incumbent re-elected.	▌ ✓ Harmar Denny (Anti-Masonic) 55.2%; ▌ ✓ John Gilmore (Jacksonian) 41.6%; ▌Robert T. Stewart (Jacksonian) 35.7%; ▌William Ayers (Anti-Masonic) 35.4%; ▌Walter Forward (Anti-Masonic) 32.2%
Pennsylvania 16 2 seats on a general ticket	John Gilmore	Jacksonian	1828	Incumbent re-elected.	▌ ✓ Harmar Denny (Anti-Masonic) 55.2%; ▌ ✓ John Gilmore (Jacksonian) 41.6%; ▌Robert T. Stewart (Jacksonian) 35.7%; ▌William Ayers (Anti-Masonic) 35.4%; ▌Walter Forward (Anti-Masonic) 32.2%
Pennsylvania 17	Richard Coulter	Jacksonian	1826	Incumbent re-elected.	▌ ✓ Richard Coulter (Jacksonian) 63.5%; ▌Thomas Pollock (Anti-Masonic) 26.5%
Pennsylvania 18	Thomas H. Sill	National; Republican	1826 (special)	Incumbent retired. Anti-Masonic gain.	▌ ✓ John Banks (Anti-Masonic) 57.1%; ▌Thomas S. Cunningham (Jacksonian) 42.9%

== Rhode Island ==
Rhode Island elected its two members at-large late on August 23, 1831.

District	Incumbent			This race	
District	Member	Party	First elected	Results	Candidates
Rhode Island at-large 2 seats on a general ticket	Tristam Burges	National Republican	1825	Incumbent re-elected.	▌ ✓ Tristam Burges (National Republican) 47.4%; ▌ ✓ Dutee J. Pearce (National Republican) 44.2%; Scattering 8.4%
Rhode Island at-large 2 seats on a general ticket	Dutee J. Pearce	National Republican	1825	Incumbent re-elected.	▌ ✓ Tristam Burges (National Republican) 47.4%; ▌ ✓ Dutee J. Pearce (National Republican) 44.2%; Scattering 8.4%

== South Carolina ==
South Carolina elected its nine members from October 11 to 12, 1830.

District	Incumbent			This race	
District	Member	Party	First elected	Results	Candidates
South Carolina 1	William Drayton	Jacksonian	1825 (special)	Incumbent re-elected.	▌ ✓ William Drayton (Unionist) 100.0%
South Carolina 2	Robert W. Barnwell	Jacksonian	1828	Incumbent re-elected as a Nullifier. Nullifier gain.	▌ ✓ Robert W. Barnwell (Nullifier) 100.0%
South Carolina 3	John Campbell	Jacksonian	1828	Incumbent lost re-election as a Nullifier. Jacksonian hold.	▌ ✓ Thomas R. Mitchell (Unionist) 53.75%; ▌John Campbell (Nullifier) 46.25%
South Carolina 4	William D. Martin	Jacksonian	1826	Incumbent retired. Jacksonian hold.	▌ ✓ John M. Felder (Unionist) 100.0%
South Carolina 5	George McDuffie	Jacksonian	1820	Incumbent re-elected as a Nullifier. Nullifier gain.	▌ ✓ George McDuffie (Nullifier) 100.0%
South Carolina 6	Warren R. Davis	Jacksonian	1826	Incumbent re-elected as a Nullifier. Nullifier gain.	▌ ✓ Warren R. Davis (Nullifier) No Data
South Carolina 7	William T. Nuckolls	Jacksonian	1826	Incumbent re-elected.	▌ ✓ William T. Nuckolls (Unionist) 100.0%
South Carolina 8	James Blair	Jacksonian	1828	Incumbent re-elected.	▌ ✓ James Blair (Unionist) 100.0%
South Carolina 9	Starling Tucker	Jacksonian	1816	Incumbent retired. Nullifier gain.	▌ ✓ John K. Griffin (Nullifier) 88.3%; ▌Beaufort T. Watts (Independent) 11.7%

== Tennessee ==
Election held late, on August 4, 1831.

District	Incumbent			This race	
District	Member	Party	First elected	Results	Candidates
Tennessee 1	John Blair	Jacksonian	1823	Incumbent re-elected.	▌ ✓ John Blair (Jacksonian) 50.27%; ▌William B. Carter (National Republican) 49.73%
Tennessee 2	Pryor Lea	Jacksonian	1827	Incumbent lost re-election. National Republican gain.	▌ ✓ Thomas D. Arnold (National Republican) 51.21%; ▌Pryor Lea (Jacksonian) 48.79%
Tennessee 3	James I. Standifer	Jacksonian	1829	Incumbent re-elected.	▌ ✓ James I. Standifer (Jacksonian) 99.51%; Scattering 0.49%
Tennessee 4	Jacob C. Isacks	Jacksonian	1823	Incumbent re-elected.	▌ ✓ Jacob C. Isacks (Jacksonian) 45.00%; ▌John B. McCormick (Unknown) 39.02%; ▌Hopkins L. Turney (Jacksonian) 15.98%
Tennessee 5	Robert Desha	Jacksonian	1827	Incumbent retired. Jacksonian hold.	▌ ✓ William Hall (Jacksonian) 50.70%; ▌Robert H. Burton (Unknown) 49.30%
Tennessee 6	James K. Polk	Jacksonian	1825	Incumbent re-elected.	▌ ✓ James K. Polk (Jacksonian) 100%
Tennessee 7	John Bell	Jacksonian	1827	Incumbent re-elected.	▌ ✓ John Bell (Jacksonian) 100%
Tennessee 8	Cave Johnson	Jacksonian	1829	Incumbent re-elected.	▌ ✓ Cave Johnson (Jacksonian) 100%
Tennessee 9	Davy Crockett	National; Republican	1827	Incumbent lost re-election. Jacksonian gain.	▌ ✓ William Fitzgerald (Jacksonian) 51.78%; ▌Davy Crockett (National Republican) 48.22%

== Vermont ==
Vermont elected its five members on September 6, 1830. Vermont required a majority vote for election, so the 3rd district election was settled on the second ballot on December 7, 1830, and the 4th district election was settled on the eleventh ballot on June 4, 1832.

District	Incumbent			This race	
District	Member	Party	First elected	Results	Candidates
Vermont 1	Jonathan Hunt	National; Republican	1827	Incumbent re-elected.	▌ ✓ Jonathan Hunt (National Republican) 58.5%; ▌Orsamus C. Merrill (Jacksonian) 31.7%; ▌Samuel Elliott (Independent) 6.1%; ▌John S. Pettibone (Anti-Masonic) 1.6%
Vermont 2	Rollin C. Mallary	National; Republican	1824	Incumbent re-elected.	▌ ✓ Rollin C. Mallary (National Republican) 84.8%; ▌William Slade (Anti-Masonic) 10.9%
Vermont 3	Horace Everett	National; Republican	1828	Incumbent re-elected.	First ballot (September 6, 1830): ▌Horace Everett (National Republican) 49.0%; ▌Royal M. Ransom (Anti-Masonic) 34.7%; ▌Alden Partridge (Jacksonian) 13.5%; ▌Jacob Collamer (Unknown) 0.4%; Write-ins 2.4%; Second ballot (December 7, 1830): ▌ ✓ Horace Everett (National Republican) 51.2%; ▌Royal M. Ransom (Anti-Masonic) 34.9%; ▌Alden Partridge (Jacksonian) 11.6%
Vermont 4	Benjamin Swift	National; Republican	1827	Incumbent retired. National Republican hold.	First ballot (September 6, 1830): ▌Heman Allen (National Republican) 48.6%; ▌Benjamin F. Bailey (Jacksonian) 29.6%; ▌Benjamin Swift (Anti-Masonic) 19.3%; ▌Samuel Swift (Unknown) 0.2%; ▌Stephen Royce (Unknown) 0.0%; ▌Alvah Sabin (Unknown) 0.0%; Second ballot (December 7, 1830): ▌Benjamin Swift (Anti-Masonic) 35.5%; ▌Heman Allen (National Republican) 34.6%; ▌Benjamin F. Bailey (Jacksonian) 29.8%; Third ballot (February 7, 1831): ▌Benjamin Swift (Anti-Masonic) 37.5%; ▌Benjamin F. Bailey (Jacksonian) 35.4%; ▌Heman Allen (National Republican) 26.2%; Fourth ballot (April 4, 1831): ▌Benjamin Swift (Anti-Masonic) 50.0%; ▌Benjamin F. Bailey (Jacksonian) 49.1%; Write-ins 0.9%; Fifth ballot (June 6, 1831): ▌Benjamin F. Bailey (Jacksonian) 42.9%; ▌Heman Allen (National Republican) 42.4%; ▌Benjamin Swift (Anti-Masonic) 13.9%; Sixth ballot (August 1, 1831): ▌Benjamin F. Bailey (Jacksonian) 43.3%; ▌Heman Allen (National Republican) 38.3%; ▌Truman Galusha (Anti-Masonic) 17.8%; Seventh ballot (October 1, 1831): ▌Benjamin F. Bailey (Jacksonian) 42.8%; ▌Heman Allen (National Republican) 38.4%; ▌Truman Galusha (Anti-Masonic) 17.9%; Eighth ballot (December 5, 1831): ▌Benjamin F. Bailey (Jacksonian) 45.1%; ▌Heman Allen (National Republican) 39.9%; ▌Truman Galusha (Anti-Masonic) 12.9%; Ninth ballot (February 6, 1832): ▌Benjamin F. Bailey (Jacksonian) 44.4%; ▌Heman Allen (National Republican) 34.7%; ▌Asa Aldis (Anti-Masonic) 20.5%; Tenth ballot (April 2, 1832): ▌Benjamin F. Bailey (Jacksonian) 44.1%; ▌Heman Allen (National Republican) 32.3%; ▌Truman Galusha (Anti-Masonic) 23.4%; Scattering; Eleventh ballot (June 4, 1832): ▌ ✓ Heman Allen (National Republican) 52.3%; ▌Asa Aldis (Anti-Masonic) 22.1%; ▌Stephen S. Brown (Jacksonian) 17.7%; ▌Truman Chittenden (National Republican) 6.5%
Vermont 5	William Cahoon	Anti-Masonic	1829	Incumbent re-elected.	▌ ✓ William Cahoon (Anti-Masonic) 52.6%; ▌Israel P. Dana (Jacksonian) 44.2%; ▌James Bell (National Republican) 0.8%

== Virginia ==
District	Incumbent			This race	
District	Member	Party	First elected	Results	Candidates
Virginia 1	George Loyall	Jacksonian	1829	Incumbent lost re-election. National Republican gain.	▌ ✓ Thomas Newton Jr. (National Republican) 51.0%; ▌George Loyall (Jacksonian) 49.0%
Virginia 2	James Trezvant	Jacksonian	1825	Incumbent retired. Jacksonian hold.	▌ ✓ John Y. Mason (Jacksonian) 57.9%; ▌Richard Eppes (Independent) 42.1%
Virginia 3	William S. Archer	Jacksonian	1820 (special)	Incumbent re-elected.	▌ ✓ William S. Archer (Jacksonian) 100%
Virginia 4	Mark Alexander	Jacksonian	1819	Incumbent re-elected.	▌ ✓ Mark Alexander (Jacksonian) 100%
Virginia 5	Thomas Bouldin	Jacksonian	1829	Incumbent re-elected.	▌ ✓ Thomas Bouldin (Jacksonian) 58.6%; ▌George W. Crump (Jacksonian) 41.4%
Virginia 6	Thomas Davenport	Jacksonian	1825	Incumbent re-elected.	▌ ✓ Thomas Davenport (Jacksonian) 100%
Virginia 7	Nathaniel Claiborne	Jacksonian	1825	Incumbent re-elected.	▌ ✓ Nathaniel Claiborne (Jacksonian) 100%
Virginia 8	Richard Coke Jr.	Jacksonian	1829	Incumbent re-elected.	▌ ✓ Richard Coke Jr. (Jacksonian) 77.3%; ▌Carter M. Braxton (Jacksonian) 22.7%
Virginia 9	Andrew Stevenson	Jacksonian	1821	Incumbent re-elected.	▌ ✓ Andrew Stevenson (Jacksonian) 100%
Virginia 10	William F. Gordon	Jacksonian	1829 (special)	Incumbent re-elected.	▌ ✓ William F. Gordon (Jacksonian) 100%
Virginia 11	John M. Patton	Jacksonian	1830 (special)	Incumbent re-elected.	▌ ✓ John M. Patton (Jacksonian) 57.4%; ▌Laurence T. Dade (Jacksonian) 42.6%
Virginia 12	John Roane	Jacksonian	1827	Incumbent retired. Jacksonian hold.	▌ ✓ John J. Roane (Jacksonian) 43.7%; ▌John H. Bernard (Independent) 31.7%; ▌Edwin Upshaw (Jacksonian) 14.1%; ▌Jonathan M. Garnett (Independent) 10.5%
Virginia 13	John Taliaferro	National; Republican	1824 (special)	Incumbent lost re-election. Jacksonian gain.	▌ ✓ Joseph Chinn (Jacksonian) 52.2%; ▌John Taliaferro (National Republican) 47.8%
Virginia 14	Charles F. Mercer	National; Republican	1817	Incumbent re-elected.	▌ ✓ Charles F. Mercer (National Republican) 55.3%; ▌John Gibson (Independent) 44.7%
Virginia 15	John S. Barbour	Jacksonian	1823	Incumbent re-elected.	▌ ✓ John S. Barbour (Jacksonian) 70.1%; ▌John R. Wallace (Independent) 29.9%
Virginia 16	William Armstrong	National; Republican	1825	Incumbent re-elected.	▌ ✓ William Armstrong (National Republican) 55.4%; ▌Edward Lucas (Jacksonian) 44.6%
Virginia 17	Robert Allen	Jacksonian	1827	Incumbent re-elected.	▌ ✓ Robert Allen (Jacksonian) 53.7%; ▌James M. Mason (Jacksonian) 46.3%
Virginia 18	Philip Doddridge	National; Republican	1829	Incumbent re-elected.	▌ ✓ Philip Doddridge (National Republican) 100%
Virginia 19	William McCoy	Jacksonian	1811	Incumbent re-elected.	▌ ✓ William McCoy (Jacksonian) 80.6%; ▌Erasmus Stribling (Independent) 19.4%
Virginia 20	Robert Craig	Jacksonian	1829	Incumbent re-elected.	▌ ✓ Robert Craig (Jacksonian) 84.4%; ▌Fleming B. Miller (Jacksonian) 15.6%
Virginia 21	Lewis Maxwell	National; Republican	1827	Incumbent re-elected.	▌ ✓ Lewis Maxwell (National Republican) 50.9%; ▌Daniel Smith (National Republican) 44.1%; ▌Johnson Reynolds (Independent) 5.0%
Virginia 22	Joseph Draper	Jacksonian	1830 (special)	Incumbent lost re-election. Jacksonian hold.	▌ ✓ Charles C. Johnston (Jacksonian) 63.0%; ▌Joseph Draper (Jacksonian) 37.0%

== Non-voting delegates ==
=== Arkansas Territory ===
Arkansas elected its delegate late on September 4, 1831.

District	Incumbent			This race	
District	Delegate	Party	First elected	Results	Candidates
Arkansas Territory at-large	Ambrose H. Sevier	Jacksonian	1828 (special)	Incumbent re-elected.	▌ ✓ Ambrose H. Sevier (Jacksonian); [data missing]

=== Florida Territory ===
Florida elected its delegate on September 1, 1830.

District	Incumbent			This race	
District	Delegate	Party	First elected	Results	Candidates
Florida Territory at-large	Joseph M. White	Jacksonian	1825	Incumbent re-elected.	▌ ✓ Joseph M. White (Jacksonian); [data missing]

=== Michigan Territory ===
Arkansas elected its delegate late on August 8, 1831.

District	Incumbent			This race	
District	Delegate	Party	First elected	Results	Candidates
Michigan Territory at-large	Vacant			Del. John Biddle (J) resigned February 21, 1831. National Republican gain.	▌ ✓ Austin E. Wing (National Republican); [data missing]

== See also ==
- 1830 United States elections
  - List of United States House of Representatives elections (1824–1854)
  - 1830–31 United States Senate elections
- 21st United States Congress
- 22nd United States Congress

== Bibliography ==
- Dubin, Michael J. (March 1, 1998). United States Congressional Elections, 1788-1997: The Official Results of the Elections of the 1st Through 105th Congresses. McFarland and Company. ISBN 978-0786402830.
- Martis, Kenneth C. (January 1, 1989). The Historical Atlas of Political Parties in the United States Congress, 1789-1989. Macmillan Publishing Company. ISBN 978-0029201701.
- Moore, John L., ed. (1994). Congressional Quarterly's Guide to U.S. Elections (Third ed.). Congressional Quarterly Inc. ISBN 978-0871879967.
- "Party Divisions of the House of Representatives* 1789–Present". Office of the Historian, House of United States House of Representatives.
