= Pennsylvania's 9th congressional district =

U.S. House district for Pennsylvania

Coordinates: 40°08′30″N 78°40′25″W

- Interactive map of district boundaries since January 3, 2023
- Representative: Dan Meuser; R–Dallas
- Distribution: 53.11% urban
- Population (2025): 771,663
- Median household income: $71,869
- Ethnicity: 87.6% White; 5.8% Hispanic; 3.0% Two or more races; 2.3% Black; 0.9% Asian; 0.4% other
- Cook PVI: R+19

Pennsylvania's 9th congressional district is located in the east central part of the state and encompasses all of Bradford, Columbia, Lebanon, Montour, Northumberland, Schuylkill, Sullivan, Susquehanna, and Wyoming counties, as well as parts of Berks, Luzerne, and Lycoming counties.

Much of the district includes Pennsylvania's Anthracite Coal Region. Republican Dan Meuser represents the district, serving since 2019.

== History ==
Before 2019, the district was located in the southern part of the state and was a very safe seat for Republicans. According to the Cook Partisan Voting Index, in 2010 the 9th was the most Republican district in Pennsylvania (and the Industrial Midwest), then with a score of R+17.

Redistricting slightly increased the number of Democrats in the district, with the addition of majority-Democratic Fayette County as well as some of the Democratic portions of Washington, Greene, Cambria and Westmoreland Counties.

In 2014, the long-time Republican incumbent, former businessman Bill Shuster, won 52.8% of the vote in a three-way Republican primary race over retired Coast Guard search and rescue pilot Art Halvorson (34.5%) and livestock farmer Travis Schooley (12.7%). In the 2012 general election, he beat his Democratic opponent, nurse Karen Ramsburg, taking 62% of the vote.

In 2010, he won 73% of the vote, and in 2008 won 64%. Shuster was first elected to the district in 2001, effectively inheriting the seat from his father, Bud Shuster, who had held the seat since 1973. Shuster announced in January 2018 that he would retire from Congress at the end of his term, and did not run for re-election in 2018.

The Supreme Court of Pennsylvania redrew this district's boundaries in February 2018 after ruling the previous map unconstitutional, also re-assigning the number to a district in east central Pennsylvania–essentially, the successor to the old 11th district – for the 2018 elections and representation thereafter. Meanwhile, the bulk of the old ninth became the new 13th district, and is as Republican as its predecessor.

== Recent election results from statewide races ==
Year	Office	Results
2008	President	McCain 56% – 42%
2008	Attorney General	Corbett 67% – 33%
2008	Auditor General	Beiler 52% – 48%
2010	Senate	Toomey 65% – 35%
2010	Governor	Corbett 69% – 31%
2012	President	Romney 61% – 39%
2012	Senate	Smith 59% – 41%
2014	Governor	Corbett 57% – 43%
2016	President	Trump 68% – 28%
2016	Senate	Toomey 62% – 31%
2016	Attorney General	Rafferty Jr. 65% – 35%
2016	Auditor General	Brown 60% – 33%
2016	Treasurer	Voit III 57% – 35%
2018	Senate	Barletta 62% – 37%
2018	Governor	Wagner 58% – 40%
2020	President	Trump 68% – 31%
2020	Attorney General	Heidelbaugh 63% – 34%
2020	Auditor General	DeFoor 66% – 29%
2020	Treasurer	Garrity 66% – 30%
2022	Senate	Oz 63% – 33%
2022	Governor	Mastriano 59% – 38%
2024	President	Trump 69% – 31%
2024	Senate	McCormick 66% – 31%
2024	Attorney General	Sunday 68% – 29%
2024	Auditor General	DeFoor 68% – 28%
2024	Treasurer	Garrity 70% – 27%

== Counties and municipalities ==
Berks County (23)
Albany Township, Bernville, Bethel Township, Centerport, Centre Township, Hamburg, Heidelberg Township, Jefferson Township, Lower Heidelberg Township (part; also 4th), Marion Township, North Heidelberg Township, Penn Township, Perry Township (part; also 4th), Robesonia, Shoemakersville, South Heidelberg Township, Tilden Township, Tulpehocken Township, Upper Bern Township, Upper Tulpehocken Township, Wernersville, Windsor Township, Womelsdorf

Bradford County (51)

All 51 municipalities

Columbia County (34)

All 34 municipalities

Lebanon County (26)

All 26 municipalities

Luzerne County (25)

Black Creek Township, Butler Township (part; also 8th), Conyngham Borough, Conyngham Township, Dallas Borough, Dorrance Township, East Berwick, Fairmount Township, Hollenback Township, Hunlock Township, Huntington Township, Lake Township, Lehman Township, Nescopeck Borough, Nescopeck Township, New Columbus, Newport Township (part; also 8th; includes Glen Lyon), Nuremberg (shared with Schuylkill County), Ross Township, Salem Township, Shickshinny, Slocum Township, Sugar Loaf Township, Union Township, Weston

Lycoming County (21)

Clinton Township, Eldred Township, Fairfield Township, Franklin Township, Hughesville, Jordan Township, Loyalsock Township, Mill Creek Township, Montgomery, Montoursville, Moreland Township, Muncy Borough, Muncy Township, Muncy Creek Township, Penn Township, Picture Rocks, Plunketts Creek Township, Shrewsbury Township, Upper Fairfield Township, Williamsport (part; also 15th), Wolf Township

Montour County (11)

All 11 municipalities

Northumberland County (36)

All 36 municipalities

Schuylkill County (68)

All 68 municipalities

Sullivan County (13)

All 13 municipalities

Susquehanna County (40)

All 40 municipalities

Wyoming County (23)

All 23 municipalities

== List of members representing the district ==
The district was created in 1795.

=== 1795–1823: one seat ===
Member (District home)	Party	Years	Cong ress	Electoral history
District first established March 4, 1795
Andrew Gregg (Bellefonte)	Democratic-Republican	March 4, 1795 – March 3, 1803	4th 5th 6th 7th	Redistricted from the at-large district and re-elected in 1794. Re-elected in 1796. Re-elected in 1798. Re-elected in 1800. Redistricted to the 5th district.
John Smilie (Fayette)	Democratic-Republican	March 4, 1803 – December 30, 1812	8th 9th 10th 11th 12th	Redistricted from the 11th district and re-elected in 1802. Re-elected in 1804. Re-elected in 1806. Re-elected in 1808. Re-elected in 1810. Redistricted to the 13th district and re-elected in 1812 but died.
Vacant		December 30, 1812 – March 3, 1813	12th	
David Bard (Frankstown)	Democratic-Republican	March 4, 1813 – March 12, 1815	13th 14th	Redistricted from the 4th district and re-elected in 1812. Re-elected in 1814. Died.
Vacant		March 12, 1815 – October 10, 1815	14th	
Thomas Burnside (Bellefonte)	Democratic-Republican	October 10, 1815 – April 1816	14th	Elected to finish Bard's term. Resigned to become President judge of Luzerne District Courts.
Vacant		April, 1816 – October 8, 1816	14th	
William Plunkett Maclay (Lewistown)	Democratic-Republican	October 8, 1816 – March 3, 1821	14th 15th 16th	Elected to finish Burnside's term. Re-elected in 1816. Re-elected in 1818. Lost re-election.
John Brown (Lewistown)	Democratic-Republican	March 4, 1821 – March 3, 1823	17th	Elected in 1820. Redistricted to the 12th district.

=== 1823–1833: three seats ===
Years	Cong ress	Seat A			Seat B			Seat C		
Years	Cong ress	Member (District home)	Party	Electoral history	Member (District home)	Party	Electoral history	Member (District home)	Party	Electoral history
March 4, 1823 – March 3, 1825	18th	George Kremer (Lewisburg)	Democratic-Republican	Elected in 1822. Re-elected in 1824. Re-elected in 1826. Retired.	Samuel McKean (Burlington)	Democratic-Republican	Elected in 1822. Re-elected in 1824. Re-elected in 1826. Retired.	William Cox Ellis (Muncy)	Jackson Federalist	Elected in 1822. Lost re-election.
March 4, 1825 – March 3, 1829	19th 20th	George Kremer (Lewisburg)	Jacksonian	Elected in 1822. Re-elected in 1824. Re-elected in 1826. Retired.	Samuel McKean (Burlington)	Jacksonian	Elected in 1822. Re-elected in 1824. Re-elected in 1826. Retired.	Espy Van Horne (Williamsport)	Jacksonian	Elected in 1824. Re-elected in 1826. Retired.
March 4, 1829 – March 3, 1831	21st	James Ford (Lawrenceville)	Jacksonian	Elected in 1828. Re-elected in 1830. [data missing]	Philander Stephens (Montrose)	Jacksonian	Elected in 1828. Re-elected in 1830. Retired.	Alem Marr (Danville)	Jacksonian	Elected in 1828. Retired.
March 4, 1831 – March 3, 1833	22nd	James Ford (Lawrenceville)	Jacksonian	Elected in 1828. Re-elected in 1830. [data missing]	Philander Stephens (Montrose)	Jacksonian	Elected in 1828. Re-elected in 1830. Retired.	Lewis Dewart (Sunbury)	Jacksonian	Elected in 1830. [data missing]

=== 1833–present: one seat ===
Member	Party	Years	Cong ress	Electoral history	Location
Henry A. P. Muhlenberg (Reading)	Jacksonian	March 4, 1833 – March 3, 1837	23rd 24th 25th	Redistricted from the 7th district and re-elected in 1832. Re-elected in 1834. Re-elected in 1836. Resigned to become U.S. Minister to the Austrian Empire.	1833–1843
Henry A. P. Muhlenberg (Reading)	Democratic	March 4, 1837 – February 8, 1838	23rd 24th 25th	Redistricted from the 7th district and re-elected in 1832. Re-elected in 1834. Re-elected in 1836. Resigned to become U.S. Minister to the Austrian Empire.	1833–1843
Vacant		February 8, 1838 – March 17, 1838	25th		1833–1843
George M. Keim (Reading)	Democratic	March 17, 1838 – March 3, 1843	25th 26th 27th	Elected to finish Muhlenberg's term. Re-elected in 1838. Re-elected in 1840. [data missing]	1833–1843
John Ritter (Reading)	Democratic	March 4, 1843 – March 3, 1847	28th 29th	Elected in 1843. Re-elected in 1844. Retired.	1843–1853
William Strong (Reading)	Democratic	March 4, 1847 – March 3, 1851	30th 31st	Elected in 1846. Re-elected in 1848. Retired.	1843–1853
J. Glancy Jones (Reading)	Democratic	March 4, 1851 – March 3, 1853	32nd	Elected in 1850. Retired.	
Isaac E. Hiester (Lancaster)	Whig	March 4, 1853 – March 3, 1855	33rd	Elected in 1852. Lost re-election.	1853–1863
Anthony Ellmaker Roberts (Lancaster)	Opposition	March 4, 1855 – March 3, 1857	34th 35th	Elected in 1854. Re-elected in 1856. Retired.	1853–1863
Anthony Ellmaker Roberts (Lancaster)	Republican	March 4, 1857 – March 3, 1859	34th 35th	Elected in 1854. Re-elected in 1856. Retired.	1853–1863
Thaddeus Stevens (Lancaster)	Republican	March 4, 1859 – August 11, 1868	36th 37th 38th 39th 40th	Elected in 1858. Re-elected in 1860. Re-elected in 1862. Re-elected in 1864. Re-elected in 1866. Died.	1853–1863
Thaddeus Stevens (Lancaster)	Republican	March 4, 1859 – August 11, 1868	36th 37th 38th 39th 40th	Elected in 1858. Re-elected in 1860. Re-elected in 1862. Re-elected in 1864. Re-elected in 1866. Died.	1863–1873
Vacant		August 11, 1868 – December 7, 1868	40th		1863–1873
Oliver James Dickey (Lancaster)	Republican	December 7, 1868 – March 3, 1873	40th 41st 42nd	Elected to finish Stevens's term. Re-elected in 1868. Re-elected in 1870. Retired.	1863–1873
A. Herr Smith (Lancaster)	Republican	March 4, 1873 – March 3, 1885	43rd 44th 45th 46th 47th 48th	Elected in 1872. Re-elected in 1874. Re-elected in 1876. Re-elected in 1878. Re-elected in 1880. Re-elected in 1882. Lost renomination.	1873–1883
A. Herr Smith (Lancaster)	Republican	March 4, 1873 – March 3, 1885	43rd 44th 45th 46th 47th 48th	Elected in 1872. Re-elected in 1874. Re-elected in 1876. Re-elected in 1878. Re-elected in 1880. Re-elected in 1882. Lost renomination.	1883–1889
John A. Hiestand (Lancaster)	Republican	March 4, 1885 – March 3, 1889	49th 50th	Elected in 1884. Re-elected in 1886. Lost renomination.	1883–1889
David B. Brunner (Reading)	Democratic	March 4, 1889 – March 3, 1893	51st 52nd	Elected in 1888. Re-elected in 1890. Retired.	1889–1893
Constantine J. Erdman (Allentown)	Democratic	March 4, 1893 – March 3, 1897	53rd 54th	Elected in 1892. Re-elected in 1894. Retired.	1893–1903
Daniel Ermentrout (Reading)	Democratic	March 4, 1897 – September 17, 1899	55th 56th	Elected in 1896. Re-elected in 1898. Died.	1893–1903
Vacant		September 17, 1899 – November 7, 1899	56th		1893–1903
Henry D. Green (Reading)	Democratic	November 7, 1899 – March 3, 1903	56th 57th	Elected to finish Ermentrout's term. Re-elected in 1900. Retired.	1893–1903
Henry B. Cassel (Marietta)	Republican	March 4, 1903 – March 3, 1909	58th 59th 60th	Redistricted from the 10th district and re-elected in 1902. Re-elected in 1904. Re-elected in 1906. [data missing]	1903–1913
William W. Griest (Lancaster)	Republican	March 4, 1909 – March 3, 1923	61st 62nd 63rd 64th 65th 66th 67th	Elected in 1908. Re-elected in 1910. Re-elected in 1912. Re-elected in 1914. Re-elected in 1916. Re-elected in 1918. Re-elected in 1920. Redistricted to the 10th district.	1903–1913
William W. Griest (Lancaster)	Republican	March 4, 1909 – March 3, 1923	61st 62nd 63rd 64th 65th 66th 67th	Elected in 1908. Re-elected in 1910. Re-elected in 1912. Re-elected in 1914. Re-elected in 1916. Re-elected in 1918. Re-elected in 1920. Redistricted to the 10th district.	1913–1933
Henry Winfield Watson (Langhorne)	Republican	March 4, 1923 – August 27, 1933	68th 69th 70th 71st 72nd 73rd	Redistricted from the 8th district and re-elected in 1922. Re-elected in 1924. Re-elected in 1926. Re-elected in 1928. Re-elected in 1930. Re-elected in 1932. Died.	1913–1933
Henry Winfield Watson (Langhorne)	Republican	March 4, 1923 – August 27, 1933	68th 69th 70th 71st 72nd 73rd	Redistricted from the 8th district and re-elected in 1922. Re-elected in 1924. Re-elected in 1926. Re-elected in 1928. Re-elected in 1930. Re-elected in 1932. Died.	1933–1943
Vacant		August 27, 1933 – November 7, 1933	73rd		1933–1943
Oliver W. Frey (Allentown)	Democratic	November 7, 1933 – January 3, 1939	73rd 74th 75th	Elected to finish Watson's term. Re-elected in 1934. Re-elected in 1936. Lost re-election.	1933–1943
Charles L. Gerlach (Allentown)	Republican	January 3, 1939 – January 3, 1945	76th 77th 78th	Elected in 1938. Re-elected in 1940. Re-elected in 1942. Redistricted to the 8th district.	1933–1943
Charles L. Gerlach (Allentown)	Republican	January 3, 1939 – January 3, 1945	76th 77th 78th	Elected in 1938. Re-elected in 1940. Re-elected in 1942. Redistricted to the 8th district.	1943–1945
J. Roland Kinzer (Lancaster)	Republican	January 3, 1945 – January 3, 1947	79th	Redistricted from the 10th district and re-elected in 1944. Retired.	1945–1953
Paul B. Dague (Downingtown)	Republican	January 3, 1947 – December 30, 1966	80th 81st 82nd 83rd 84th 85th 86th 87th 88th 89th	Elected in 1946. Re-elected in 1948. Re-elected in 1950. Re-elected in 1952. Re-elected in 1954. Re-elected in 1956. Re-elected in 1958. Re-elected in 1960. Re-elected in 1962. Re-elected in 1964. Resigned.	1945–1953
Paul B. Dague (Downingtown)	Republican	January 3, 1947 – December 30, 1966	80th 81st 82nd 83rd 84th 85th 86th 87th 88th 89th	Elected in 1946. Re-elected in 1948. Re-elected in 1950. Re-elected in 1952. Re-elected in 1954. Re-elected in 1956. Re-elected in 1958. Re-elected in 1960. Re-elected in 1962. Re-elected in 1964. Resigned.	1953–1963
Paul B. Dague (Downingtown)	Republican	January 3, 1947 – December 30, 1966	80th 81st 82nd 83rd 84th 85th 86th 87th 88th 89th	Elected in 1946. Re-elected in 1948. Re-elected in 1950. Re-elected in 1952. Re-elected in 1954. Re-elected in 1956. Re-elected in 1958. Re-elected in 1960. Re-elected in 1962. Re-elected in 1964. Resigned.	1963–1973
Vacant		December 30, 1966 – January 3, 1967	89th		1963–1973
G. Robert Watkins (West Chester)	Republican	January 3, 1967 – August 7, 1970	90th 91st	Redistricted from the 7th district and re-elected in 1966. Re-elected in 1968. Died.	1963–1973
Vacant		August 7, 1970 – November 3, 1970	91st		1963–1973
John H. Ware III (Oxford)	Republican	November 3, 1970 – January 3, 1973	91st 92nd	Elected to finish Watkins's term. Re-elected in 1970. Redistricted to the 5th district.	1963–1973
Bud Shuster (Everett)	Republican	January 3, 1973 – February 3, 2001	93rd 94th 95th 96th 97th 98th 99th 100th 101st 102nd 103rd 104th 105th 106th 107th	Elected in 1972. Re-elected in 1974. Re-elected in 1976. Re-elected in 1978. Re-elected in 1980. Re-elected in 1982. Re-elected in 1984. Re-elected in 1986. Re-elected in 1988. Re-elected in 1990. Re-elected in 1992. Re-elected in 1994. Re-elected in 1996. Re-elected in 1998. Re-elected in 2000. Resigned.	1973–1983
Bud Shuster (Everett)	Republican	January 3, 1973 – February 3, 2001	93rd 94th 95th 96th 97th 98th 99th 100th 101st 102nd 103rd 104th 105th 106th 107th	Elected in 1972. Re-elected in 1974. Re-elected in 1976. Re-elected in 1978. Re-elected in 1980. Re-elected in 1982. Re-elected in 1984. Re-elected in 1986. Re-elected in 1988. Re-elected in 1990. Re-elected in 1992. Re-elected in 1994. Re-elected in 1996. Re-elected in 1998. Re-elected in 2000. Resigned.	1983–1993
Bud Shuster (Everett)	Republican	January 3, 1973 – February 3, 2001	93rd 94th 95th 96th 97th 98th 99th 100th 101st 102nd 103rd 104th 105th 106th 107th	Elected in 1972. Re-elected in 1974. Re-elected in 1976. Re-elected in 1978. Re-elected in 1980. Re-elected in 1982. Re-elected in 1984. Re-elected in 1986. Re-elected in 1988. Re-elected in 1990. Re-elected in 1992. Re-elected in 1994. Re-elected in 1996. Re-elected in 1998. Re-elected in 2000. Resigned.	1993–2003
Vacant		February 4, 2001 – May 15, 2001	107th		1993–2003
Bill Shuster (Hollidaysburg)	Republican	May 15, 2001 – January 3, 2019	107th 108th 109th 110th 111th 112th 113th 114th 115th	Elected to finish his father's term. Re-elected in 2002. Re-elected in 2004. Re-elected in 2006. Re-elected in 2008. Re-elected in 2010. Re-elected in 2012. Re-elected in 2014. Re-elected in 2016. Redistricted to the 13th district and retired.	1993–2003
Bill Shuster (Hollidaysburg)	Republican	May 15, 2001 – January 3, 2019	107th 108th 109th 110th 111th 112th 113th 114th 115th	Elected to finish his father's term. Re-elected in 2002. Re-elected in 2004. Re-elected in 2006. Re-elected in 2008. Re-elected in 2010. Re-elected in 2012. Re-elected in 2014. Re-elected in 2016. Redistricted to the 13th district and retired.	2003–2013
Bill Shuster (Hollidaysburg)	Republican	May 15, 2001 – January 3, 2019	107th 108th 109th 110th 111th 112th 113th 114th 115th	Elected to finish his father's term. Re-elected in 2002. Re-elected in 2004. Re-elected in 2006. Re-elected in 2008. Re-elected in 2010. Re-elected in 2012. Re-elected in 2014. Re-elected in 2016. Redistricted to the 13th district and retired.	2013–2019
Dan Meuser (Dallas)	Republican	January 3, 2019 – present	116th 117th 118th 119th	Elected in 2018. Re-elected in 2020. Re-elected in 2022. Re-elected in 2024. Re-elected in 2026.	2019–2023
Dan Meuser (Dallas)	Republican	January 3, 2019 – present	116th 117th 118th 119th	Elected in 2018. Re-elected in 2020. Re-elected in 2022. Re-elected in 2024. Re-elected in 2026.	2023–present

== Recent election results ==
=== 2012 ===
Pennsylvania's 9th congressional district, 2012
Party	Candidate	Votes	%
Republican	Bill Shuster (incumbent)	169,177	61.67
Democratic	Karen Ramsburg	105,128	38.33
Total votes		274,305	100.0
Republican hold			

=== 2014 ===
Pennsylvania's 9th congressional district, 2014
Party	Candidate	Votes	%
Republican	Bill Shuster (Incumbent)	110,094	63.52
Democratic	Alanna Hartzok	63,223	36.48
Total votes		173,317	100.0
Republican hold			

=== 2016 ===
Pennsylvania's 9th congressional district, 2016
Party	Candidate	Votes	%
Republican	Bill Shuster (incumbent)	186,580	63.3
Democratic	Arthur L Halvorson	107,985	36.7
Total votes		294,565	100.0
Republican hold			

=== 2018 ===
Pennsylvania's 9th congressional district, 2018
Party	Candidate	Votes	%
Republican	Dan Meuser	148,723	59.75
Democratic	Denny Wolff	100,204	40.25
Total votes		248,927	100.0
Republican hold			

=== 2020 ===
Pennsylvania's 9th congressional district, 2020
Party	Candidate	Votes	%
Republican	Dan Meuser (incumbent)	232,988	66.3
Democratic	Gary Wegman	118,266	33.7
Total votes		351,254	100.0
Republican hold			

=== 2022 ===
Pennsylvania's 9th congressional district, 2022
Party	Candidate	Votes	%
Republican	Dan Meuser (incumbent)	209,185	69.3
Democratic	Amanda Waldman	92,622	30.7
Total votes		301,807	100.0
Republican hold			

=== 2024 ===
Pennsylvania's 9th congressional district, 2024
Party	Candidate	Votes	%
Republican	Dan Meuser (incumbent)	276,212	70.5
Democratic	Amanda Waldman	115,523	29.5
Total votes		391,735	100.0
Republican hold			

== See also ==
- List of United States congressional districts
- Pennsylvania's congressional districts
