= John Brown (Pennsylvania politician) =

American politician

Member of the U.S. House of Representatives from Pennsylvania
- In office March 4, 1821 – March 3, 1825
- Preceded by: William Plunkett Maclay
- Succeeded by: John Mitchell
- Constituency: 9th district (1821–1823); 12th district (1823–1825)

Member of the Pennsylvania House of Representatives
- In office 1809-1813

Personal details
- Born: August 12, 1772 near Lewistown, Province of Pennsylvania, British America
- Died: October 12, 1845 (aged 73) near Skyland, North Carolina, U.S.
- Party: Republican; Jackson Republican

John Brown (August 12, 1772 – October 12, 1845) was an American mill owner and statesman from Lewistown, Pennsylvania. He represented Pennsylvania in the U.S. Congress from 1821 to 1825.

== Biography ==
John Brown was born on August 12, 1772, near Lewistown in the Province of Pennsylvania. He attended and received his education from the common schools and moved to Lewistown in 1800. Brown became involved in the gristmill and sawmill businesses and was elected to the Pennsylvania House of Representatives, where he served from 1809 to 1813.

Brown was elected as a Republican to the United States House of Representatives for the 17th Congress in 1820. He was reelected in 1822 to the 18th Congress as a Jackson Republican. After departing the House of Representatives in 1825, Brown resumed his former business interests. He subsequently moved to Buncombe County, North Carolina in 1827, where he participated in the agriculture and real estate businesses.

Brown died in Buncombe County, North Carolina, near Skyland, on October 12, 1845. He was interred in Riverside Cemetery in Asheville, North Carolina.

U.S. House of Representatives
Preceded by William Plunkett Maclay	Member of the U.S. House of Representatives from Pennsylvania's 9th congressional district 1821–1823	Succeeded by William Cox Ellis; George Kremer; Samuel McKean
Preceded by Thomas Patterson	Member of the U.S. House of Representatives from Pennsylvania's 12th congressional district 1823–1825	Succeeded by John Mitchell
