= Thomas Burnside =

American judge and politician (1782–1851)

Member of the U.S. House of Representatives from Pennsylvania's 9th district
- In office October 10, 1815 – April 1816
- Preceded by: David Bard
- Succeeded by: William Plunkett Maclay

Member of the Pennsylvania Senate for the 13th district
- In office 1811-1812; 1823-1826

Personal details
- Born: July 28, 1782 Newtownstewart, County Tyrone, Ireland
- Died: March 13, 1851 (aged 68) Germantown, Pennsylvania, U.S.
- Party: Democratic-Republican

Thomas Burnside (July 28, 1782 – March 25, 1851) was an American politician and judge who served as a Democratic-Republican member of the United States House of Representatives for Pennsylvania's 9th congressional district from 1815 to 1816 and as an associate justice of the Supreme Court of Pennsylvania from 1845 until his death in 1851.

== Early life and education ==
Thomas Burnside was born near Newtownstewart, County Tyrone, Ireland. He emigrated to the United States with his father’s family, who settled in Norristown, Pennsylvania, in 1793. He studied law, was admitted to the bar in 1804 and commenced practice in Bellefonte, Pennsylvania.

== Career ==
He was appointed deputy attorney general on January 12, 1809, and served in the Pennsylvania State Senate for the 13th district from 1811 to 1814 and again from 1823 to 1826 when he also served as Speaker of the Senate.

Burnside was elected as a Democratic-Republican to the Fourteenth Congress to fill the vacancy caused by the death of David Bard and served until his resignation in April 1816. He was appointed president judge of the Luzerne district courts in 1815, and resigned in 1819. He was again a member of the Pennsylvania State Senate and its presiding officer in 1823. He was president judge of the fourth judicial district from 1826 to 1841 and later presided in the same capacity over the seventh judicial district. He was appointed an associate justice of the Supreme Court of Pennsylvania in 1845, which office he held until his death in Germantown, Pennsylvania.

== Notes ==
U.S. House of Representatives
Preceded by David Bard	Member of the U.S. House of Representatives from Pennsylvania's 9th congressional district 1815–1816	Succeeded by William Plunkett Maclay
Pennsylvania State Senate
Preceded by Isaiah Graham	Member of the Pennsylvania Senate, 13th district 1811-1812	Succeeded by Jacob Alter
Preceded by Jacob Alter	Member of the Pennsylvania Senate, 13th district 1823-1826	Succeeded by Henry Petrikin
