= Samuel McKean =

American politician (1787–1841)

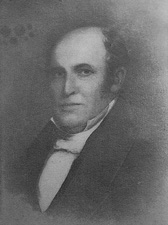

United States Senator from Pennsylvania
- In office March 4, 1833 – March 4, 1839
- Preceded by: George M. Dallas
- Succeeded by: Daniel Sturgeon

Member of the U.S. House of Representatives from Pennsylvania's 9th district
- In office March 4, 1823 – March 3, 1829
- Preceded by: Seat added
- Succeeded by: Philander Stephens

Member of the Pennsylvania Senate for the 11th district
- In office 1829–1830

Member of the Pennsylvania House of Representatives
- In office 1815–1819

Personal details
- Born: April 7, 1787 Kishacoquillas Valley, Pennsylvania, United States
- Died: December 14, 1841 (aged 54) West Burlington Township, Pennsylvania, United States
- Party: Jacksonian

Samuel McKean (April 7, 1787 – December 14, 1841) was an American merchant and politician from Burlington, Pennsylvania, who served as a Democratic member of the U.S. Senate for Pennsylvania from 1833 to 1839 and of the U.S. House of Representatives for Pennsylvania's 9th congressional district from 1823 to 1829. He served in the Pennsylvania House of Representatives from 1815 to 1819 and the Pennsylvania State Senate for the 11th district from 1829 to 1830.

== Biography ==
Samuel McKean was born on April 7, 1787, in Huntingdon County, Pennsylvania. He worked as a merchant in Burlington, Pennsylvania, before becoming a member of the Bradford County board of commissioners. McKean served in the Pennsylvania House of Representatives from 1815 until 1819 and was a major general in the Pennsylvania State Militia. He was elected to the United States House of Representatives in 1822 and was re-elected in 1824 and 1826, serving until March 1829. While in the U.S. House, he was a member of the Committee on Post Offices and Post Roads during the 20th Congress. He then returned to the state legislature, serving in the Pennsylvania Senate for the 11th district from 1829 to 1830.

A Democrat, McKean served as a presidential elector for the Jackson/Van Buren ticket during the 1832 election. He was elected by the state legislature to the United States Senate in 1833, where he served one term until March 1839. He was chairman of the Senate Committee to Audit and Control the Contingent Expenses from 1835 until 1839.

McKean died in West Burlington, Pennsylvania, on December 14, 1841, and was interred in the Old Methodist Church Cemetery in Burlington, Pennsylvania.

His nephew James B. McKean was a U.S. Representative from New York from 1859 until 1863.

Pennsylvania House of Representatives
Preceded by	Member of the Pennsylvania House of Representatives; 1815-1819	Succeeded by
Pennsylvania State Senate
Preceded by John Ryon, Jr.	Member of the Pennsylvania Senate, 11th district 1829-1830	Succeeded by Reuben Wilber
U.S. House of Representatives
Preceded by John Brown	Member of the U.S. House of Representatives from Pennsylvania's 9th congressional district 1823–1829 1823–1825 alongside: William Cox Ellis and George Kremer; 1825–1829 alongside: George Kremer and Espy Van Horne	Succeeded by James Ford; Alem Marr; Philander Stephens
U.S. Senate
Preceded by George M. Dallas	U.S. senator (Class 1) from Pennsylvania; 1833–1839; Served alongside: William Wilkins, James Buchanan	Succeeded by Daniel Sturgeon
