= Robert Allison (Pennsylvania politician) =

American politician (1777–1840)

Member of the U.S. House of Representatives from Pennsylvania's 12th district
- In office March 4, 1831 – March 3, 1833
- Preceded by: John Scott
- Succeeded by: George Chambers

Personal details
- Born: March 10, 1777 near Greencastle, Pennsylvania, U.S.
- Died: December 2, 1840 (aged 63) Huntingdon, Pennsylvania, U.S.
- Resting place: River View Cemetery, Huntingdon, Pennsylvania, U.S.
- Party: Anti-Masonic
- Spouse: Mary Elliott (m. 1802)
- Children: 4
- Parent(s): John Allison; Elizabeth Wilkin
- Occupation: Politician, lawyer

Military service
- Allegiance: United States
- Rank: Captain
- Battles/wars: War of 1812

Robert Allison (March 10, 1777 – December 2, 1840) was an American politician and lawyer who served a single term in the United States House of Representatives, representing the 12th congressional district of Pennsylvania from 1831 to 1833 as a member of the Anti-Masonic Party.

== Early life and education ==
Allison born near Greencastle, Pennsylvania, on March 10, 1777, to John Allison and Elizabeth Wilkin. He attended local and private schools before moving to Huntingdon, Pennsylvania, in 1795.

== Career ==
Allison was employed as a clerk in his brother's office. He studied law and was admitted to the bar in April 1798, after which he commenced practice in Huntingdon.

Allison served as a captain in the Huntingdon Volunteers during the War of 1812. At the close of the war, he returned to Huntingdon and resumed practicing law.

Allison served as a burgess of Huntingdon in 1815, 1817, and 1819, from 1821 to 1824, and again in 1826.

Allison was an unsuccessful candidate for election in 1824 to the 19th United States Congress, in 1826 to the 20th United States Congress, and in 1828 to the 21st United States Congress.

Allison was elected as an Anti-Masonic candidate to the 22nd United States Congress. He served from March 4, 1831, to March 3, 1833, representing the 12th congressional district of Pennsylvania.

Allison was not a candidate for renomination in 1832 to the 23rd United States Congress. Following his tenure in Congress, Allison resumed practicing law in Huntingdon until his death in 1840.

== Personal life and death ==
Allison married Mary Elliott in 1802. They had four children together.

Allison died at the age of 63 in Huntingdon, Pennsylvania, on December 2, 1840. He was interred in River View Cemetery, located in Huntingdon.

== See also ==
- List of United States representatives who served a single term

U.S. House of Representatives
Preceded by John Scott	Member of the U.S. House of Representatives from Pennsylvania's 12th congressional district 1831–1833	Succeeded by George Chambers
