= George Chambers (Pennsylvania politician) =

American judge (1786–1866)

Member of the U.S. House of Representatives from Pennsylvania's 12th district
- In office March 4, 1833 – March 3, 1837
- Preceded by: Robert Allison
- Succeeded by: Daniel Sheffer

Personal details
- Born: February 24, 1786 Chambersburg, Pennsylvania
- Died: March 25, 1866 (aged 80)
- Party: Anti-Masonic

George Chambers (February 24, 1786 – March 25, 1866) was an Anti-Masonic member of the U.S. House of Representatives from Pennsylvania.

George Chambers was born in Chambersburg, Pennsylvania. He graduated from Princeton College in 1804, studied law, was admitted to the bar in 1807 and commenced practice in Chambersburg.

Chambers was elected as an Anti-Masonic candidate to the Twenty-third and Twenty-fourth Congresses. After his time in Congress, he resumed the practice of law and was a member of the State constitutional convention in 1837. He was appointed a justice of the Pennsylvania Supreme Court on April 12, 1851, which position he held until it was vacated by constitutional provision. From 1849 to 1858 he served as a trustee of Lafayette College. He died in Chambersburg in 1866. Interment in Falling Spring Presbyterian Churchyard.

== Sources ==
- United States Congress. "George Chambers (id: C000283)". Biographical Directory of the United States Congress.
- The Political Graveyard

U.S. House of Representatives
Preceded by Robert Allison	Member of the U.S. House of Representatives from Pennsylvania's 12th congressional district 1833–1837	Succeeded by Daniel Sheffer
