= George Kremer =

American politician

Member of the U.S. House of Representatives from Pennsylvania's 9th district
- In office March 4, 1823 – March 3, 1829
- Preceded by: John Brown
- Succeeded by: James Ford; Alem Marr; Philander Stephens

Personal details
- Born: November 21, 1775 Middletown, Province of Pennsylvania, British America
- Died: September 11, 1854 (aged 78) Middleburg, Pennsylvania, U.S.
- Party: Jacksonian

George Kremer (November 21, 1775 – September 11, 1854) was a member of the United States House of Representatives from Pennsylvania.

== Biography ==
Born in Middletown in the Province of Pennsylvania on November 21, 1775, Kremer studied law, was admitted to the bar and began his legal practice in Lewisburg, Pennsylvania.

A member of the Pennsylvania House of Representatives in 1812 and 1813, Kremer was elected as a Jackson Republican to the Eighteenth Congress and reelected as a Jacksonian to the Nineteenth and Twentieth Congresses.

Kremer died in Middleburg, Pennsylvania, and was interred in the private burial ground on his family estate near Middleburg, Pennsylvania.

== Legacy ==
Kremer is best remembered for publishing (and later defending) an anonymous letter in the Philadelphia newspaper, Columbian Observer, in which he accused Henry Clay of having made a "bargain" with John Quincy Adams to throw Clay's support to Adams in the presidential election of 1824 (which was decided in the House of Representatives) in exchange for being given the position of Secretary of State. Kremer's letter charged that Clay had first made the offer to Andrew Jackson, who had refused it. Clay vigorously disputed the allegations and demanded an official House investigation, during which Kremer refused to testify. The "Corrupt Bargain" charge continued to haunt Clay for the remainder of his political career.

== Bibliography ==
Russ, William A., Jr. The Political Ideas of George Kremer. Pennsylvania History 7 (October 1940): 201–12.

U.S. House of Representatives
Preceded by John Brown	Member of the U.S. House of Representatives from Pennsylvania's 9th congressional district 1823–1829 1823–1825 alongside: William Cox Ellis and Samuel McKean; 1825–1829 alongside: Samuel McKean and Espy Van Horne	Succeeded by James Ford; Alem Marr; Philander Stephens
