= John Mitchell (Pennsylvania politician) =

American politician

John Mitchell (March 8, 1781 – August 3, 1849) was a member of the U.S. House of Representatives from Pennsylvania.

== Background ==
John Mitchell was born near Newport, Pennsylvania. He moved to Bellefonte, Pennsylvania, in 1800 and was employed as a clerk in the ironworks. He was elected sheriff of Centre County, Pennsylvania, in 1818. He worked as an engineer and surveyor and laid out the Centre and Kishacoquillas Turnpike in 1821 and constructed many of the turnpikes in middle and northern Pennsylvania. He was a member of the Pennsylvania House of Representatives in 1822 and 1823.

Mitchell was elected as a Jacksonian to the Nineteenth and Twentieth Congresses. After his time in congress, Mitchell surveyed proposed canal routes between the Susquehanna and Potomac Rivers in 1826. He was an engineer on the Erie extension in 1827 and canal commissioner in 1829. He moved to Bridgewater, Pennsylvania, in 1842 and engaged in civil engineering and iron manufacturing. He was member of the canal survey commission from 1845 until his death in Bridgewater in 1849. Interment in Old Beaver Cemetery.

== Sources ==
- United States Congress. "John Mitchell (id: M000817)". Biographical Directory of the United States Congress.
- The Political Graveyard

U.S. House of Representatives
Preceded by John Brown	Member of the U.S. House of Representatives from Pennsylvania's 12th congressional district 1825–1829	Succeeded by John Scott
