= William Plunkett Maclay =

American politician

William Plunkett Maclay (August 23, 1774 – September 2, 1842) was a member of the United States House of Representatives from Pennsylvania.

William P. Maclay (son of Samuel Maclay and nephew of William Maclay) was born in Northumberland County, Pennsylvania. He was prothonotary of Mifflin County, Pennsylvania, from 1808 to 1814, and a member of the Pennsylvania House of Representatives.

Maclay was elected as a Democratic-Republican to the Fourteenth Congress to fill the vacancy caused by the resignation of Thomas Burnside. He was reelected to the Fifteenth and Sixteenth Congresses. He was not a candidate for renomination in 1820. He was a member of the State convention to alter and amend the constitution at Harrisburg, Pennsylvania, in 1837. He was later engaged as a surveyor and in agricultural pursuits. He died in Milroy, Pennsylvania, in 1842 and is interred at Milroy Presbyterian Cemetery.

== Sources ==
- United States Congress. "William Plunkett Maclay (id: M000033)". Biographical Directory of the United States Congress.
- The Political Graveyard

U.S. House of Representatives
Preceded by Thomas Burnside	Member of the U.S. House of Representatives from Pennsylvania's 9th congressional district 1816–1821	Succeeded by John Brown
