= Lewis Dewart =

American politician

Member of the U.S. House of Representatives from Pennsylvania's 9th district
- In office March 4, 1831 – March 3, 1833
- Preceded by: See below
- Succeeded by: See below

Member of the Pennsylvania Senate
- In office 1823-1826

Member of the Pennsylvania House of Representatives
- In office 1812-1820

Personal details
- Born: November 14, 1780 Sunbury, Pennsylvania
- Died: April 26, 1852 (aged 71) Sunbury, Pennsylvania
- Party: Jacksonian Democrat

Lewis Dewart (November 14, 1780 – April 26, 1852) was a Jacksonian member of the U.S. House of Representatives from Pennsylvania.

== Biography ==
Lewis Dewart (father of William Lewis Dewart) was born in Sunbury, Pennsylvania. He was a clerk in his father's store for several years and later became a coal operator and banker. He served as postmaster at Sunbury from 1806 to 1816. He was a member of the Pennsylvania House of Representatives from 1812 to 1820. He was elected to the Pennsylvania State Senate in 1823 and served three years. He was one of the organizers and builders of the Danville & Pottsville Railroad, and served as one of the first directors.

Dewart was elected as a Jacksonian to the Twenty-second Congress. He was again a member of the Pennsylvania House of Representatives from 1835 to 1840 and served as speaker in 1840. He was chief burgess of Sunbury in 1837 and a member of the school board. He was an unsuccessful candidate for the Democratic nomination for Governor of Pennsylvania in 1841. He died in Sunbury in 1852 and was buried in Sunbury Cemetery.

== See also ==
- Speaker of the Pennsylvania House of Representatives

== Sources ==
- United States Congress. "Lewis Dewart (id: D000289)". Biographical Directory of the United States Congress.
- The Political Graveyard

U.S. House of Representatives
Preceded by Alem Marr; Philander Stephens; James Ford	Member of the U.S. House of Representatives from Pennsylvania's 9th congressional district 1831–1833 alongside: James Ford and Philander Stephens	Succeeded by Henry A. P. Muhlenberg
