= Espy Van Horne =

American politician (1795–1829)

Espy Van Horne (1795 – August 25, 1829) was a member of the United States House of Representatives from Pennsylvania.

Espy Van Horne was born in Lycoming County, Pennsylvania. He was elected to the Nineteenth and Twentieth Congresses. He died in Williamsport, Pennsylvania, in 1829.

U.S. House of Representatives
Preceded by Samuel McKean; George Kremer; William Cox Ellis	Member of the U.S. House of Representatives from Pennsylvania's 9th congressional district 1825–1829 alongside: Samuel McKean and George Kremer	Succeeded by James Ford; Alem Marr; Philander Stephens
