= Alem Marr =

American politician

Alem Marr (June 18, 1787—March 29, 1843) was a Jacksonian member of the United States House of Representatives from Pennsylvania.

Marr was born in Upper Mount Bethel Township, Pennsylvania. In 1795 he and his family relocated near Milton, Pennsylvania. He graduated from Princeton College in 1807, studied law, was admitted to the bar in 1813 and commenced practice in Danville, Pennsylvania.

Marr was elected as a Jacksonian to the Twenty-first Congress. He was not a candidate for renomination in 1830 and retired to his farm near Milton where he died; his remains were interred in Milton Cemetery.

== Sources ==
- United States Congress. "Alem Marr (id: M000141)". Biographical Directory of the United States Congress.
- The Political Graveyard

U.S. House of Representatives
| Preceded by Samuel McKean; George Kremer; Espy Van Horne | Member of the U.S. House of Representatives from Pennsylvania's 9th congressional district 1829–1831 alongside: James Ford and Philander Stephens | Succeeded by Lewis Dewart; Philander Stephens; James Ford |
