= James L. Hodges =

American politician

Member of the U.S. House of Representatives from Massachusetts's 12th district
- In office March 4, 1827 – March 3, 1833
- Preceded by: Francis Baylies
- Succeeded by: John Quincy Adams

Personal details
- Born: April 24, 1790 Taunton, Massachusetts
- Died: March 8, 1846 (aged 55) Taunton, Massachusetts
- Party: National Republican
- Occupation: Lawyer

James Leonard Hodges (April 24, 1790 – March 8, 1846) was a U.S. representative from Massachusetts.

Born in Taunton, Massachusetts, Hodges attended the common schools. He studied law. He was admitted to the bar and practiced law. He later worked as a bank cashier. He was then postmaster of Taunton. He served as member of the Massachusetts Constitutional Convention of 1820–1821. He served in the senate in 1823 and 1824.

Hodges was elected as an Adams candidate to the Twentieth Congress and reelected as an Anti-Jacksonian to the Twenty-first and Twenty-second Congresses (March 4, 1827 – March 3, 1833). He declined to be a candidate for renomination. He died in Taunton, Massachusetts, March 8, 1846. He was interred in Plain Burying Ground.

U.S. House of Representatives
Preceded by Francis Baylies	Member of the U.S. House of Representatives from Massachusetts's 12th congressional district March 4, 1827 - March 3, 1833	Succeeded by John Quincy Adams
