= Philander Stephens =

American politician

Philander Stephens (1788 – July 8, 1842) was a Jacksonian member of the U.S. House of Representatives from Pennsylvania.

Philander Stephens was born near Montrose, Pennsylvania. He served as coroner in 1815, county commissioner in 1818 and sheriff in 1821. He was a member of the Pennsylvania House of Representatives in 1824 and 1825.

Stephens was elected as a Jacksonian to the Twenty-first and Twenty-second Congresses. He served as chairman of the United States House Committee on Expenditures in the Department of the Treasury during the Twenty-second Congress. He was not a candidate for renomination in 1832. He resumed agricultural and mercantile pursuits and died probably in Springville Township, Pennsylvania. Interment in Stephens Burying Ground in Dimock Township, Pennsylvania.

== Sources ==
- United States Congress. "Philander Stephens (id: S000859)". Biographical Directory of the United States Congress.
- The Political Graveyard

U.S. House of Representatives
Preceded by Samuel McKean; George Kremer; Espy Van Horne	Member of the U.S. House of Representatives from Pennsylvania's 9th congressional district 1829–1833 1829–1831 alongside: Alem Marr and James Ford; 1831–1833 alongside: Lewis Dewart and James Ford	Succeeded by Henry A. P. Muhlenberg
