= John Scott (Pennsylvania politician, born 1784) =

American politician

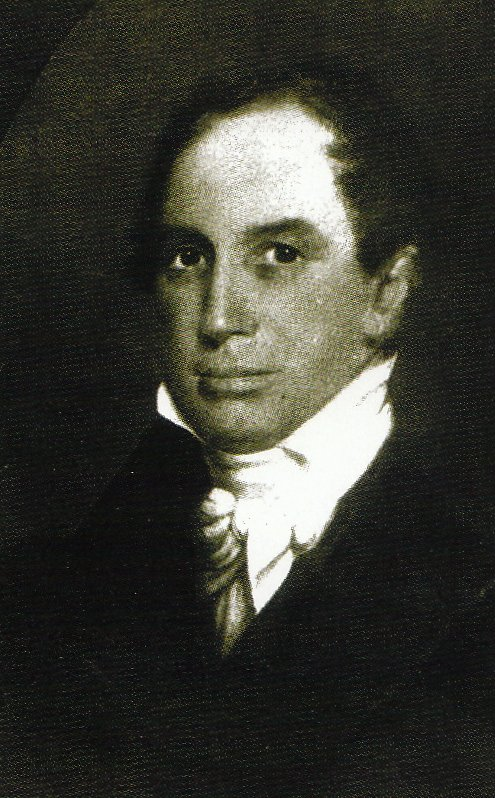

Member of the U.S. House of Representatives from Pennsylvania's 12th district
- In office March 4, 1829 – March 3, 1831
- Preceded by: John Mitchell
- Succeeded by: Robert Allison

Personal details
- Born: December 25, 1784 Marsh Creek, Pennsylvania
- Died: September 22, 1850 (aged 65) Alexandria, Pennsylvania, U.S.
- Party: Jacksonian
- Spouse: Agnes Irvine Scott
- Children: Susan Scott; John Scott; James Irvin Scott; George Washington Scott; William Scott; Mary Irvin Scott; Alfred Scott
- Profession: Politician, Tanner, Shoemaker

John Scott (December 25, 1784 – September 22, 1850) was a member of the U.S. House of Representatives from Pennsylvania.

== Biography ==
John Scott (father of Pennsylvania Senator John Scott and of the 1868 candidate for Governor of Florida, George Washington Scott) was born at Marsh Creek, Pennsylvania, near Gettysburg, Pennsylvania. He moved to Alexandria, Pennsylvania, in 1806 and worked as tanner and shoemaker. He served as major in the War of 1812. He was a member of the Pennsylvania House of Representatives in 1819 and 1820.

Scott was elected as a Jacksonian to the Twenty-first Congress. He was an unsuccessful candidate for reelection to the Twenty-second Congress. He resumed his former business pursuits and retired from business in 1842. He died in Alexandria, Pennsylvania in 1850. He was interred in Alexandria Cemetery.

Scott married Agnes Irvine in 1821, Agnes is the namesake of Agnes Scott College in Decatur Georgia.

U.S. House of Representatives
Preceded by John Mitchell	Member of the U.S. House of Representatives from Pennsylvania's 12th congressional district 1829–1831	Succeeded by Robert Allison
