= James Ford (Pennsylvania politician) =

American politician

Member of the U.S. House of Representatives from Pennsylvania's 9th district
- In office March 4, 1829 – March 3, 1833
- Preceded by: See below
- Succeeded by: Henry A. P. Muhlenberg

Member of the Pennsylvania House of Representatives
- In office 1824-1825

Personal details
- Born: May 4, 1783 Perth Amboy, New Jersey, U.S.
- Died: August 18, 1859 (aged 76) Lawrenceville, Pennsylvania, U.S.
- Party: Jacksonian

James Ford (May 4, 1783 – August 18, 1859) was a Jacksonian member of the U.S. House of Representatives from Pennsylvania.

== Biography ==
James Ford was born in Perth Amboy, New Jersey. He moved to New York City in 1797 and to Lindsley Town (later Lindley, New York) in 1803. He moved to Tioga County, Pennsylvania, and was elected a member of the Pennsylvania House of Representatives in 1824 and 1825.

Ford was elected as a Jacksonian to the Twenty-first and Twenty-second Congresses. He operated a sawmill and a gristmill at Lawrenceville, Pennsylvania, until his death at that place in 1859. Interment in the old Lindsley family cemetery at Lindley, New York.

The James Ford House is a house he had built for his son in 1831. It was listed on the National Register of Historic Places in 1975.

== Sources ==
- United States Congress. "James Ford (id: F000263)". Biographical Directory of the United States Congress.
- The Political Graveyard

U.S. House of Representatives
Preceded by Samuel McKean; George Kremer; Espy Van Horne	Member of the U.S. House of Representatives from Pennsylvania's 9th congressional district 1829–1833 1829–1831 alongside: Alem Marr and Philander Stephens; 1831–1833 alongside: Lewis Dewart and Philander Stephens	Succeeded by Henry A. P. Muhlenberg
