= 1832–33 United States House of Representatives elections =

House elections for the 23rd U.S. Congress

- July 2, 1832 – October 7, 1833 (Note: Not including special election and the few regular elections that went past this date for several ballots)

All 240 seats in the United States House of Representatives 121 seats needed for a majority
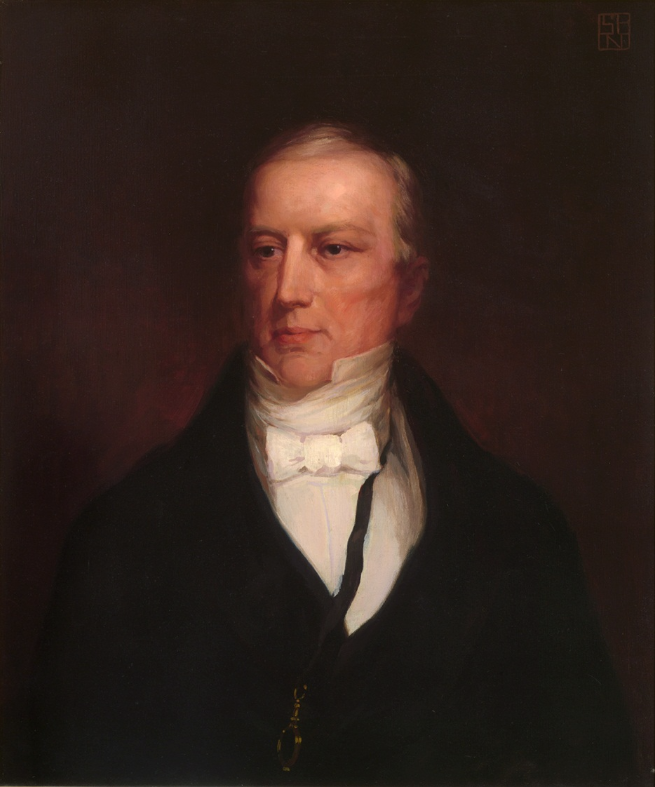

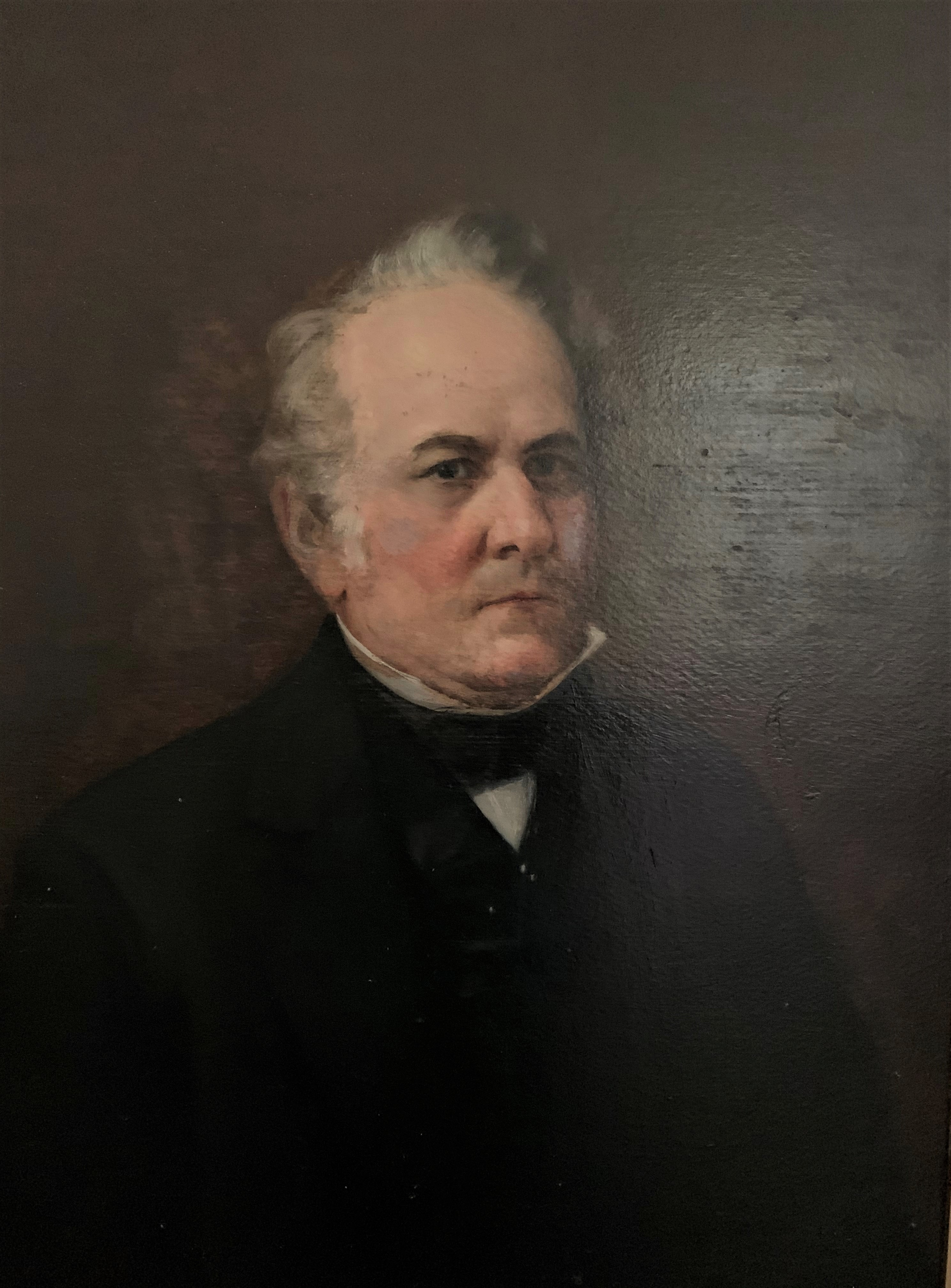
| | Majority party | Minority party |
|---|---|---|
| Leader | Andrew Stevenson | Lewis Williams |
| Party | Jacksonian | National Republican |
| Leader's seat | Virginia 11th | North Carolina 13th |
| Last election | 126 seats | 66 seats |
| Seats won | 143 (Note: There are discrepancies among the sources, e.g. Dubin, pg. 108 (and Moore, pg. 956–959) vs. Martis, pg. 92 (and "Party Divisions of the House of Representatives* 1789–Present". Office of the Historian, House of United States House of Representatives.): Dubin lists 145 Democrats (or Jacksonians, including 1 Independent Democrat), 60 National Republicans, 24 Anti-Masons, 7 Southern Rights or Nullifiers, and 1 "Unionist", while the latter sources list 143 Jacksonians or Democrats, 63 National Republicans or National Republicans, 25 Anti-Masons, and 9 Nullifiers. Figures used here defer to Martis and the party figures from the Historian of the House.) (Note: Includes 1 seat won by a Unionist candidate in South Carolina) | 63 |
| Seat change | ▲17 | ▼3 |
| Popular vote | 739,441 (Note: Includes 10,572 votes for Unionist candidates in South Carolina) | 340,738 |
| Percentage | 53.95% | 24.85% |
| Swing | ▲1.02 pp | ▼6.69 pp |
| | Third party | Fourth party |
| Party | Anti-Masonic | Nullifier |
| Last election | 17 seats | 4 seats |
| Seats won | 25 (Note: Includes 1 seat won by a People's candidate in Rhode Island) | 9 |
| Seat change | ▲8 | ▲5 |
| Popular vote | 202,625 (Note: Includes 2,078 votes for a People's candidate in Rhode Island) | 14,998 |
| Percentage | 14.78% | 1.09% |
| Swing | ▲2.62 pp | ▲0.75 pp |
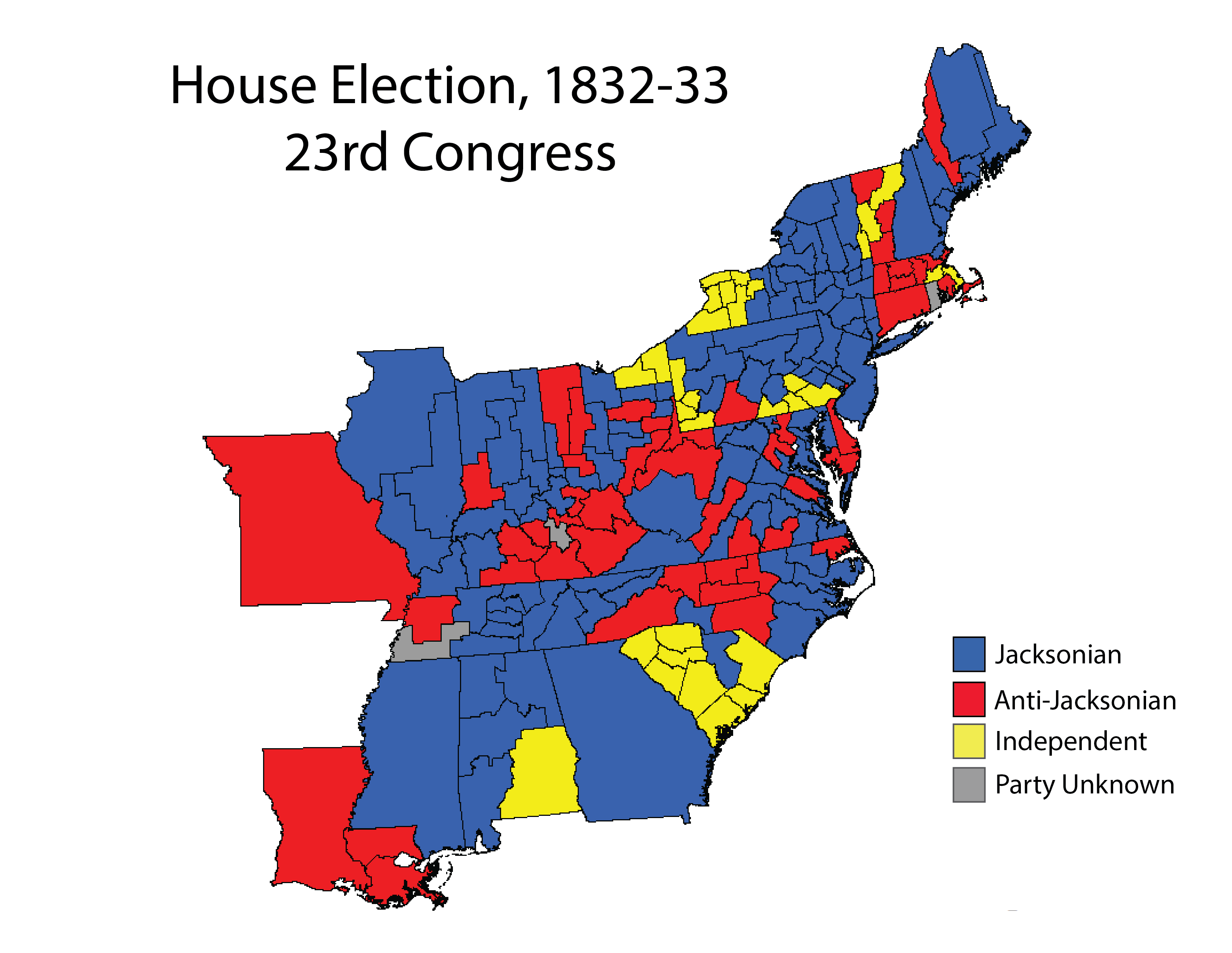
Speaker before election
Andrew Stevenson
Jacksonian
Elected Speaker
Andrew Stevenson
Jacksonian

The 1832–33 United States House of Representatives elections were held on various dates in various states between July 2, 1832, and October 7, 1833. Each state set its own date for its elections to the House of Representatives before the first session of the 23rd United States Congress convened on December 2, 1833. They were held concurrently with the 1832 presidential election, in which Democrat (Note: By this point, Jacksonians also started to be known as Democrats.) Andrew Jackson was reelected. The congressional reapportionment based on the 1830 United States census increased the size of the House to 240 seats.

The Jacksonians gained 17 seats, picking up several new seats in districts that were created by the reapportionment, with the rival National Republican Party losing three seats.

Economic issues were key factors in this election: Southern agricultural districts reacted angrily to the passage of the Tariff of 1832, which led to the Nullification Crisis. President Andrew Jackson and the Jacksonians showed a distrust for the banking sector, particularly the central Second Bank of the United States, which was strongly supported by the rival National Republican Party. (Note: By this point, National Republicans were also known as National Republicans.)

The third-party Anti-Masonic Party, based on anti-Masonry, gained eight seats, and Nullifier Party, a John C. Calhoun-led states' rights party that supported South Carolina in the Nullification Crisis, picked up eight of the nine representatives in South Carolina's delegation.

The House initially elected Andrew Stevenson as Speaker, but he resigned from the House after President Jackson appointed him as U.S. Minister to the United Kingdom: National Republican Representatives subsequently elected John Bell as Speaker over James Polk.

== Election summaries ==
Following the 1830 census, 27 new seats were apportioned, with 4 states losing 1 seat each, 8 states having no change, and the remaining 12 states gaining between 1 and 6 seats.

↓
| 63 | 25 | 143 | 9 |
| National Republican | Anti-Masonic | Jacksonian | N |

| State | Type | Date | Total seats | | National Republican | | Anti-Masonic | | Jacksonian | | Nullifier | |
| State | Type | Date | Seats | Change | Seats | Change | Seats | Change | Seats | Change | Seats | Change |
|---|---|---|---|---|---|---|---|---|---|---|---|---|
| Delaware | At-large | November 13, 1832 | 1 | Steady | 1 | Steady | 0 | Steady | 0 | Steady | 0 | Steady |
| Georgia | At-large | October 1, 1832 | 9 | ▲2 | 0 | Steady | 0 | Steady | 9 | ▲2 | 0 | Steady |
| Illinois | Districts | August 6, 1832 | 3 | ▲2 | 0 | Steady | 0 | Steady | 3 | ▲2 | 0 | Steady |
| Louisiana (Note: While Dubin (pg. 103) and Moore (pg. 956) indicate that Philemon Thomas of LA-02 was a Democrat/Jeffersonian, Martis (pg. 92) lists Philemon Thomas as a National Republican/Anti-Jeffersonian – figures listed here defer to Martis in this case.) | Districts | July 2–4, 1832 | 3 | Steady | 3 | Steady | 0 | Steady | 0 | Steady | 0 | Steady |
| Mississippi | At-large | August 6–7, 1832 | 2 | ▲1 | 0 | Steady | 0 | Steady | 2 | ▲1 | 0 | Steady |
| Missouri (Note: Missouri held an election in 1832 for the first seat in its at-large district, and again in 1833 for the second seat in that district.) | At-large | August 5–6, 1833 | 2 | ▲1 | 2 | ▲1 | 0 | Steady | 0 | Steady | 0 | Steady |
| New Jersey | At-large | November 6, 1832 | 6 | Steady | 0 | ▼6 | 0 | Steady | 6 | ▲6 | 0 | Steady |
| New York | District | November 5–7, 1832 | 40 | ▲6 | 0 | ▼3 | 8 | Steady | 32 | ▲9 | 0 | Steady |
| Ohio | Districts | October 9, 1832 | 19 | ▲5 | 6 | ▼2 | 2 | ▲2 | 11 | ▲5 | 0 | Steady |
| Pennsylvania | Districts | October 9, 1832 | 28 | ▲2 | 4 | ▲2 | 10 | ▲3 | 14 | ▼3 | 0 | Steady |
Late elections (after the March 4, 1833, beginning of the term)
| Alabama | Districts | August 5, 1833 | 5 | ▲2 | 0 | Steady | 0 | Steady | 4 | ▲1 | 1 | ▲1 |
| Connecticut | At-large | April 11, 1833 | 6 | Steady | 6 | Steady | 0 | Steady | 0 | Steady | 0 | Steady |
| Indiana | Districts | August 5, 1833 | 7 | ▲4 | 1 | ▲1 | 0 | Steady | 6 | ▲3 | 0 | Steady |
| Kentucky | Districts | August 5, 1833 | 13 | ▲1 | 9 | ▲5 | 0 | Steady | 4 | ▼4 | 0 | Steady |
| Maine | Districts | September 9, 1833 | 8 | ▲1 | 1 | Steady | 0 | Steady | 7 | ▲1 | 0 | Steady |
| Maryland | Districts | October 7, 1833 | 8 | ▼1 | 2 | ▼3 | 0 | Steady | 6 | ▲2 | 0 | Steady |
| Massachusetts | Districts | April 1, 1833 | 12 | ▼1 | 9 | ▼4 | 2 | ▲2 | 1 | ▲1 | 0 | Steady |
| New Hampshire | At-large | March 12, 1833 | 5 | ▼1 | 0 | Steady | 0 | Steady | 5 | ▼1 | 0 | Steady |
| North Carolina | Districts | August 8, 1833 | 13 | Steady | 7 | ▲5 | 0 | Steady | 6 | ▼5 | 0 | Steady |
| Rhode Island | At-large | August 27, 1833 | 2 | Steady | 1 | ▼1 | 1 | ▲1 | 0 | Steady | 0 | Steady |
| South Carolina | Districts | September 2–3, 1833 | 9 | Steady | 0 | Steady | 0 | Steady | 1 | ▼4 | 8 | ▲4 |
| Tennessee | Districts | August 1–2, 1833 | 13 | ▲4 | 1 | Steady | 0 | Steady | 12 | ▲4 | 0 | Steady |
| Vermont | Districts | January 1, 1833 | 5 | Steady | 3 | Steady | 2 | Steady | 0 | Steady | 0 | Steady |
| Virginia | Districts | April 1833 | 21 | ▼1 | 7 | ▲2 | 0 | Steady | 14 | ▼3 | 0 | Steady |
| Total | | | 240 | ▲27 | 63 26.3% | ▼3 | 25 10.4% | ▲8 | 143 59.6% | ▲17 | 9 3.8% | ▲5 |

House seats
| Jacksonian | 59.58% |
| National Republican | 26.25% |
| Anti-Masonic | 10.42% |
| Nullifier | 3.75% |

== Special elections ==
=== 22nd Congress ===
| District | Incumbent | | | This race | |
| District | Member | Party | First elected | Results | Candidates |
|---|---|---|---|---|---|
| Maryland 6 | George Edward Mitchell | Jacksonian | 1822; 1826 (retired); 1829 | Incumbent died June 28, 1832. New member elected October 1, 1832 and seated December 3, 1832. Jacksonian hold. | ▌ ✓ Charles S. Sewall (Jacksonian) 51.36%; ▌Thomas Veazey (National Republican) 48.64% |
| Virginia 22 | Charles Clement Johnston | Jacksonian | 1831 | Incumbent died June 17, 1832. New member elected in 1832 and seated December 12, 1832. Jacksonian hold. | ▌ ✓ Joseph Draper (Jacksonian) 54.9%; ▌John B. George (Unknown) 45.1% |
| Vermont 1 | Jonathan Hunt | National; Republican | 1827 | Incumbent died May 15, 1832. New member elected January 1, 1833 and seated January 21, 1833. National Republican hold. Winner also elected to the next term; see below. | First ballot (July 6, 1832): ▌Richard Skinner (National Republican) 42.6%; ▌William Czar Bradley (Jacksonian) 24.0%; ▌Hiland Hall (National Republican) 18.6%; ▌John Phelps (Anti-Masonic) 11.7%; Second ballot (September 4, 1832): ▌Richard Skinner (National Republican) 45.2%; ▌Orsamus Cook Merrill (Jacksonian) 24.9%; ▌John Phelps (Anti-Masonic) 12.4%; ▌William Czar Bradley (Jacksonian) 5.8%; ▌Daniel Kellogg (Jacksonian) 5.6%; ▌John S. Pettibone (Anti-Masonic) 4.7%; ▌Hiland Hall (National Republican) 1.3%; Third ballot (November 6, 1832): ▌Hiland Hall (National Republican) 47.9%; ▌Orsamus Cook Merrill (Jacksonian) 27.9%; ▌John Phelps (Anti-Masonic) 12.1%; ▌John S. Pettibone (Anti-Masonic) 7.6%; ▌Richard Skinner (National Republican) 2.7%; ▌Roswell Field (Unknown) 0.8%; ▌William C. Bradley (Jacksonian) 0.4%; Fourth ballot (January 1, 1833): ▌ ✓ Hiland Hall (National Republican) 55.2%; ▌Orsamus Cook Merrill (Jacksonian) 27.6%; ▌John Phelps (Anti-Masonic) 8.6%; ▌Daniel Kellogg (Jacksonian) 5.9%; ▌John S. Pettibone (Anti-Masonic) 1.8% |
| Virginia 18 | Philip Doddridge | National; Republican | 1829 | Incumbent died November 19, 1832. New member elected January 1, 1833 and seated January 21, 1833. Jacksonian gain. | ▌ ✓ Joseph Johnson (Jacksonian) 43.1%; ▌Thomas B. Haywood (Unknown) 37.7%; ▌Moses W. Chapline (Unknown) 17.9%; ▌Joseph Jackson (Unknown) 0.8%; ▌[FNU] McFewan (Unknown) 0.6% |

=== 23rd Congress ===
| District | Incumbent | | | This race | |
| District | Member | Party | First elected | Results | Candidates |
|---|---|---|---|---|---|
| Virginia 5 | John Randolph | Jacksonian | 1815; 1817 (retired); 1819; 1825 (resigned); 1827; 1829 (retired); 1833 | Incumbent died May 24, 1833. New member elected in August 1833. Jacksonian hold. | ▌ ✓ Thomas Bouldin (Jacksonian) 91.59%; ▌Daniel A. Wilson (Unknown) 8.41% |
| Pennsylvania 1 | Joel B. Sutherland | Jacksonian | 1826 | Incumbent member-elect resigned March 3, 1833, to become a judge, but then resigned that position to run for this seat. Incumbent re-elected October 8, 1833. | ▌ ✓ Joel B. Sutherland (Jacksonian) 56.4%; ▌John Sergeant (National Republican) 42.5% |

== Alabama ==
| District | Incumbent | | | This race | |
| District | Member | Party | First elected | Results | Candidates |
|---|---|---|---|---|---|
| Alabama 1 | Clement C. Clay | Jacksonian | 1829 | Incumbent re-elected. | ▌ ✓ Clement C. Clay (Jacksonian) 100.0% |
| Alabama 2 | None (new district) | | | New seat. Jacksonian gain. | ▌ ✓ John McKinley (Jacksonian) 52.50%; ▌James Davis (Unknown) 35.51% |
| Alabama 3 | Samuel W. Mardis; Redistricted from the 2nd district | Jacksonian | 1831 | Incumbent re-elected. | ▌ ✓ Samuel W. Mardis (Jacksonian) 57.50%; ▌Elisha Young (National Republican) 22.10%; ▌R. E. B. Baylor (Jacksonian) 20.40% |
| Alabama 4 | Dixon H. Lewis; Redistricted from the 3rd district | Jacksonian | 1831 | Incumbent re-elected. | ▌ ✓ Dixon H. Lewis (Jacksonian) 100.0% |
| Alabama 5 | None (new district) | | | New seat. Jacksonian gain. | ▌ ✓ John Murphy (Jacksonian) 59.82%; ▌James Dellet (National Republican) 40.18% |

== Connecticut ==
Connecticut kept its apportionment at 6 seats and elected its members at-large April 11, 1833.

| District | Incumbent | | | This race | |
| District | Member | Party | First elected | Results | Candidates |
|---|---|---|---|---|---|
| Connecticut at-large 6 seats on a general ticket | Noyes Barber | National Republican | 1821 | Incumbent re-elected. | ▌ ✓ Noyes Barber (National Republican) 9.7%; ▌ ✓ William W. Ellsworth (National Republican) 9.6%; ▌ ✓ Ebenezer Young (National Republican) 9.6%; ▌ ✓ Jabez W. Huntington (National Republican) 9.0%; ▌ ✓ Samuel A. Foot (National Republican) 7.7%; ▌ ✓ Samuel Tweedy (National Republican) 7.5%; ▌Andrew T. Judson (Jacksonian) 7.2%; ▌Epaphias Porter (Jacksonian) 7.1%; ▌William Hollabird (Jacksonian) 7.0%; ▌Samuel Simons (Jacksonian) 6.6%; ▌Gideon Welles (Jacksonian) 6.6%; ▌Labun Clark (Jacksonian) 6.3%; ▌William Hubbard (Anti-Masonic) 2.0%; ▌Alanson Hamlin (Anti-Masonic) 1.9%; Scattering <1.0 % |
| Connecticut at-large 6 seats on a general ticket | William W. Ellsworth | National Republican | 1829 | Incumbent re-elected. | |
| Connecticut at-large 6 seats on a general ticket | Ebenezer Young | National Republican | 1829 | Incumbent re-elected. | |
| Connecticut at-large 6 seats on a general ticket | Jabez W. Huntington | National Republican | 1829 | Incumbent re-elected. | |
| Connecticut at-large 6 seats on a general ticket | Ralph I. Ingersoll | National Republican | 1825 | Incumbent retired. National Republican hold. | |
| Connecticut at-large 6 seats on a general ticket | William L. Storrs | National Republican | 1829 | Incumbent retired. National Republican hold. | |

== Delaware ==
| District | Incumbent | | | This race | |
| District | Member | Party | First elected | Results | Candidates |
|---|---|---|---|---|---|
| Delaware at-large | John J. Milligan | National; Republican | 1830 | Incumbent re-elected. | ▌ ✓ John J. Milligan (National Republican) 50.68%; ▌Martin W. Bates (Jacksonian) 49.32% |

== Georgia ==
Georgia now had 9 seats, having gained 2 seats in reapportionment, and elected its members at-large on October 1, 1832.

| District | Incumbent | | | This race | |
| District | Member | Party | First elected | Results | Candidates |
|---|---|---|---|---|---|
| Georgia at-large 9 seats on a general ticket | James M. Wayne | Jacksonian | 1828 | Incumbent re-elected. | ▌ ✓ James M. Wayne (Jacksonian) 8.19%; ▌ ✓ Richard H. Wilde (Jacksonian) 7.18%; ▌ ✓ George R. Gilmer (Jacksonian) 6.27%; ▌ ✓ Augustin S. Clayton (Jacksonian) 6.22%; ▌ ✓ Thomas F. Foster (Jacksonian) 6.14%; ▌ ✓ Roger L. Gamble (Jacksonian) 5.84%; ▌ ✓ Seaborn Jones (Jacksonian) 5.45%; ▌ ✓ William Schley (Jacksonian) 5.39%; ▌ ✓ John E. Coffee (Jacksonian) 5.36%; ▌Charles E. Haynes (Jacksonian) 5.21%; ▌George W. Owens (Jacksonian) 5.14%; ▌James C. Terrell (Jacksonian) 5.14%; ▌James C. Watson (Jacksonian) 5.03%; ▌Henry Branham (Jacksonian) 4.94% |
| Georgia at-large 9 seats on a general ticket | Richard H. Wilde | Jacksonian | 1814; 1816 (lost); 1824 (special); 1826 (lost); 1827 (special) | Incumbent re-elected. | |
| Georgia at-large 9 seats on a general ticket | Wiley Thompson | Jacksonian | 1820 | Incumbent retired. Jacksonian hold. | |
| Georgia at-large 9 seats on a general ticket | Augustin S. Clayton | Jacksonian | 1831 (special) | Incumbent re-elected. | |
| Georgia at-large 9 seats on a general ticket | Thomas F. Foster | Jacksonian | 1828 | Incumbent re-elected. | |
| Georgia at-large 9 seats on a general ticket | Henry G. Lamar | Jacksonian | 1829 (special) | Incumbent lost re-election. Jacksonian hold. | |
| Georgia at-large 9 seats on a general ticket | Daniel Newnan | Jacksonian | 1830 | Incumbent lost re-election. Jacksonian hold. | |
| Georgia at-large 9 seats on a general ticket | None (new seat) | | | New seat. Jacksonian gain. | |
| Georgia at-large 9 seats on a general ticket | None (new seat) | | | New seat. Jacksonian gain. | |

== Illinois ==
Illinois gained two seats in reapportionment and elected its three members on August 6, 1832.

| District | Incumbent | | | This race | |
| District | Member | Party | First elected | Results | Candidates |
|---|---|---|---|---|---|
| Illinois 1 | None (new district) | | | New seat. Jacksonian gain. | ▌ ✓ Charles Slade (Jacksonian) 31.3%; ▌Ninian Edwards (National Republican) 26.3%; ▌Sidney Breese (Jacksonian) 22.4%; ▌Charles Dunn (Unknown) 12.9%; ▌Henry L. Webb (Unknown) 7.0% |
| Illinois 2 | None (new district) | | | New seat. Jacksonian gain. | ▌ ✓ Zadok Casey (Jacksonian) 46.0%; ▌William B. Archer (Jacksonian) 31.1%; ▌Wickliffe Kitchell (Jacksonian) 22.9% |
| Illinois 3 | Joseph Duncan; Redistricted from the at-large district | Jacksonian | 1826 | Incumbent re-elected. | ▌ ✓ Joseph Duncan (Jacksonian) 76.8%; ▌Jonathan H. Pugh (Unknown) 21.7%; ▌William L. May (Jacksonian) 1.3% |

== Indiana ==
| District | Incumbent | | | This race | |
| District | Member | Party | First elected | Results | Candidates |
|---|---|---|---|---|---|
| Indiana 1 | Ratliff Boon | Jacksonian | 1828 | Incumbent re-elected. | ▌ ✓ Ratliff Boon (Jacksonian) 50.62%; ▌Dennis Pennington (National Republican) 14.27%; ▌Robert M. Evans (Unknown) 13.62%; ▌James R. Goodlet (Unknown) 10.04%; ▌Seth M. Leavenworth (Unknown) 7.78%; ▌David G. Mitchell (Unknown) 3.67% |
| Indiana 2 | None (new district) | | | New seat. National Republican gain. | ▌ ✓ John Ewing (National Republican) 20.94%; ▌John W. Davis (Jacksonian) 20.92%; ▌John Law (Unknown) 18.19%; ▌George Boon (Unknown) 15.91%; ▌William C. Linton (Unknown) 12.90%; ▌Hugh Livingston (Unknown) 11.14% |
| Indiana 3 | John Carr; Redistricted from the 2nd district | Jacksonian | 1831 | Incumbent re-elected. | ▌ ✓ John Carr (Jacksonian) 58.17%; ▌Harbin H. Moore (National Republican) 41.83% |
| Indiana 4 | None (new district) | | | New seat. Jacksonian gain. | ▌ ✓ Amos Lane (Jacksonian) 50.78%; ▌John Test (National Republican) 41.17%; ▌Enoch Mccarty (Unknown) 8.05% |
| Indiana 5 | Johnathan McCarty; Redistricted from the 3rd district | Jacksonian | 1831 | Incumbent re-elected. | ▌ ✓ Johnathan McCarty (Jacksonian) 51.82%; ▌Oliver H. Smith (National Republican) 48.18% |
| Indiana 6 | None (new district) | | | New seat. Jacksonian gain. | ▌ ✓ George L. Kinnard (Jacksonian) 52.82%; ▌William W. Wick (Jacksonian) 47.02%; ▌James B. Ray (Independent) 0.16% |
| Indiana 7 | None (new district) | | | New seat. Jacksonian gain. | ▌ ✓ Edward A. Hannegan (Jacksonian) 53.97%; ▌Albert S. White (National Republican) 45.66%; ▌Harrison R. Thomas (Unknown) 0.23%; ▌Joseph M. Hayes (Unknown) 0.15% |

== Kentucky ==
| District | Incumbent | | | This race | |
| District | Member | Party | First elected | Results | Candidates |
Kentucky 1
Kentucky 2
Kentucky 3
Kentucky 4
Kentucky 5
Kentucky 6
Kentucky 7
Kentucky 8
Kentucky 9
Kentucky 10
Kentucky 11
Kentucky 12
Kentucky 13

== Louisiana ==
| District | Incumbent | | | This race | |
| District | Member | Party | First elected | Results | Candidates |
|---|---|---|---|---|---|
| Louisiana 1 | Edward D. White Sr. | National Republican | 1828 | Incumbent re-elected. | ▌ ✓ Edward D. White Sr. (National Republican) 100% |
| Louisiana 2 | Philemon Thomas | Jacksonian | 1831 | Incumbent re-elected. | ▌ ✓ Philemon Thomas (Jacksonian) 51.16%; ▌Eleazer W. Ripley (National Republican) 48.84% |
| Louisiana 3 | Henry A. Bullard | National Republican | 1831 | Incumbent re-elected. | ▌ ✓ Henry A. Bullard (National Republican) 53.19%; ▌Alexander Morton (Jacksonian) 46.81% |

== Maine ==
Maine held its elections September 9, 1833.

| District | Incumbent | | | This race | |
| District | Member | Party | First elected | Results | Candidates |
Maine 1
Maine 2
Maine 3
Maine 4
Maine 5
Maine 6
Maine 7
| Maine 8 | None (new district) | | | New seat. Jacksonian gain. | ▌ ✓ Gorham Parks (Jacksonian) 62.21%; ▌Ebenezer Hutcinson (National Republican) 32.98%; ▌Judah McLellan (Anti-Masonic) 4.81% |

== Maryland ==
| District | Incumbent | | | This race | |
| District | Member | Party | First elected | Results | Candidates |
Maryland 1
Maryland 2
Maryland 3
Maryland 4
Maryland 5
Maryland 6
Maryland 7
Maryland 8

== Massachusetts ==
Elections were held April 1, 1833, after the term began but before the House convened in December 1833. However, at least one district went to several ballots into early 1834.

| District | Incumbent | | | This race | |
| District | Member | Party | First elected | Results | Candidates |
|---|---|---|---|---|---|
| Massachusetts 1 | Nathan Appleton | National; Republican | 1830 | Incumbent retired. National Republican hold. | ▌ ✓ Benjamin Gorham (National Republican) 57.45%; ▌Henry Lee (Independent) 42.56% |
| Massachusetts 2 | Benjamin Crowninshield | Jacksonian | 1823 | Incumbent lost re-election. National Republican gain. | ▌ ✓ Rufus Choate (National Republican) 59.12%; ▌Benjamin Crowninshield (Jacksonian) 26.06%; Scattering 14.82% |
| Massachusetts 3 | Jeremiah Nelson | National; Republican | 1832 (late) | Incumbent retired. New member elected late on the third ballot. Jacksonian gain. | First ballot (April 1, 1833): ▌Caleb Cushing (National Republican) 42.31%; ▌Gayton P. Osgood (Jacksonian) 33.81%; ▌Ebenezer Bradbury (Unknown) 20.09%; ▌Benjamin F. Varnum (Anti-Masonic) 3.80%; Second ballot (May 6, 1833): ▌Caleb Cushing (National Republican) 44.12%; ▌Gayton P. Osgood (Jacksonian) 35.65%; ▌Ebenezer Bradbury (Unknown) 16.76%; ▌Benjamin F. Varnum (Anti-Masonic) 3.48%; Third ballot (June 10, 1833): ▌ ✓ Gayton P. Osgood (Jacksonian) 52.54%; ▌Caleb Cushing (National Republican) 46.39%; ▌Ebenezer Bradbury (Unknown) 1.07% |
| Massachusetts 4 | Edward Everett | National; Republican | 1830 | Incumbent re-elected. | ▌ ✓ Edward Everett (National Republican) 78.34%; ▌John Wade (Jacksonian) 21.66% |
| Massachusetts 5 | John Davis | National; Republican | 1824 | Incumbent re-elected. | ▌ ✓ John Davis (National Republican) 86.86%; ▌John Brown (Independent) 10.00%; ▌John Spurr (Jacksonian) 3.14% |
| Massachusetts 6 | George Grennell Jr. Redistricted from the 7th district | National; Republican | 1828 | Incumbent re-elected. | ▌ ✓ George Grennell Jr. (National Republican) 75.08%; ▌William Whitaker (Anti-Masonic) 15.63%; ▌Israel Billings (Unknown) 9.29% |
Massachusetts 7
| Massachusetts 8 | Isaac C. Bates | National; Republican | 1826 | Incumbent re-elected. | ▌ ✓ Isaac C. Bates (National Republican) 79.59%; ▌William W. Thompson (Jacksonian) 12.23%; ▌Samuel Lathrop (Anti-Masonic) |
| Massachusetts 9 | Henry Dearborn; Redistricted from the 10th district | National; Republican | 1830 | Incumbent lost re-election. New member elected late on the eighth ballot. Anti-Masonic gain. | First ballot (April 1, 1833): ▌Henry A. Dearborn (National Republican) 49.43%; ▌William Jackson (Anti-Masonic) 40.65%; ▌Ebenezer Seaver (Jacksonian) 5.24%; ▌Daniel Thurber (Jacksonian) 4.69%; Second ballot (May 6, 1833): ▌Henry A. Dearborn (National Republican) 46.36%; ▌William Jackson (Anti-Masonic) 42.91%; ▌Daniel Thurber (Jacksonian) 10.73%; Third ballot (June 10, 1833): ▌Henry A. Dearborn (National Republican) 49.02%; ▌William Jackson (Anti-Masonic) 42.90%; ▌Daniel Thurber (Jacksonian) 8.08%; Fourth ballot (August 12, 1833): ▌Henry A. Dearborn (National Republican) 45.28%; ▌William Jackson (Anti-Masonic) 38.37%; ▌Daniel Thurber (Jacksonian) 16.35%; Fifth ballot (November 11, 1833): ▌Henry A. Dearborn (National Republican) 42.13%; ▌William Jackson (Anti-Masonic) 38.70%; ▌Daniel Thurber (Jacksonian) 19.18%; Sixth ballot (December 16, 1834): ▌William Jackson (Anti-Masonic) 41.39%; ▌Henry A. Dearborn (National Republican) 37.60%; ▌Daniel Thurber (Jacksonian) 18.49%; ▌Theron Metcalf (Unknown) 2.52%; Seventh ballot (January 27, 1834): ▌William Jackson (Anti-Masonic) 53.51%; ▌Henry A. Dearborn (National Republican) 34.33%; ▌Daniel Thurber (Jacksonian) 12.16%; Eighth ballot (February 17, 1834): ▌ ✓ William Jackson (Anti-Masonic) 46.78%; ▌Henry A. Dearborn (National Republican) 37.41%; ▌Daniel Thurber (Jacksonian) 15.81% |
| Massachusetts 10 | James L. Hodges; Redistricted from the 12th district | National; Republican | 1827 | Incumbent retired. National Republican hold. | ▌ ✓ William Baylies (National Republican) 53.16%; ▌Micah B. Ruggles (Anti-Masonic) 46.84% |
Massachusetts 11
| Massachusetts 12 | John Quincy Adams; Redistricted from the 11th district | National; Republican | 1830 | Incumbent re-elected from a new party. Anti-Masonic gain. | ▌ ✓ John Quincy Adams (Anti-Masonic) 78.40%; ▌Jedediah Lincoln (Jacksonian) 21.60% |

== Mississippi ==
Elections held early, on August 6, 1832.

| District | Incumbent | | | This race | |
| District | Member | Party | First elected | Results | Candidates |
|---|---|---|---|---|---|
| Mississippi at-large 2 seats on a general ticket | Franklin E. Plummer | Jacksonian | 1830 | Incumbent re-elected. | ▌ ✓ Franklin E. Plummer (Jacksonian) 33.38%; ▌ ✓ Harry Cage (Jacksonian) 32.59%; ▌John I. Guion (Unknown) 19.20%; ▌Felix H. Walker (Unknown) 9.39%; ▌Nathan Bouldin (Unknown) 5.45% |
| Mississippi at-large 2 seats on a general ticket | None (new seat) | | | New seat. Jacksonian gain. | ▌ ✓ Franklin E. Plummer (Jacksonian) 33.38%; ▌ ✓ Harry Cage (Jacksonian) 32.59%; ▌John I. Guion (Unknown) 19.20%; ▌Felix H. Walker (Unknown) 9.39%; ▌Nathan Bouldin (Unknown) 5.45% |

== Missouri ==
Missouri elected one member on August 6, 1832, and the other on August 5, 1833.

| District | Incumbent | | | This race | |
| District | Member | Party | First elected | Results | Candidates |
|---|---|---|---|---|---|
| Missouri at-large 2 seats | William H. Ashley | Jacksonian | 1831 | Incumbent re-elected. | First election (August 6, 1832): ▌ ✓ William H. Ashley (Jacksonian) 56.22%; ▌ Robert W. Wells (Jacksonian) 43.78%; Second election (August 5, 1833): ▌ ✓ John Bull (National Republican) 27.70%; ▌George Strother (Jacksonian) 27.39%; ▌George Shannon (Jacksonian) 25.88%; ▌James Harvey Birch (Unknown) 16.07%; ▌George C. Sibley (National Republican) 2.96% |
| Missouri at-large 2 seats | None (new seat) | | | New seat. National Republican gain. | First election (August 6, 1832): ▌ ✓ William H. Ashley (Jacksonian) 56.22%; ▌ Robert W. Wells (Jacksonian) 43.78%; Second election (August 5, 1833): ▌ ✓ John Bull (National Republican) 27.70%; ▌George Strother (Jacksonian) 27.39%; ▌George Shannon (Jacksonian) 25.88%; ▌James Harvey Birch (Unknown) 16.07%; ▌George C. Sibley (National Republican) 2.96% |

== New Hampshire ==
| District | Incumbent | | | This race | |
| District | Member | Party | First elected | Results | Candidates |
|---|---|---|---|---|---|
| New Hampshire at-large 5 seats | John Brodhead | Jacksonian | 1829 | Incumbent retired. Jacksonian hold. | Elected on a general ticket: ▌ ✓ Henry Hubbard (Jacksonian) 15.19%; ▌ ✓ Benning M. Bean (Jacksonian) 15.14%; ▌ ✓ Franklin Pierce (Jacksonian) 15.14%; ▌ ✓ Robert Burns (Jacksonian) 15.12%; ▌ ✓ Joseph M. Harper (Jacksonian) 15.05%; ▌Anthony Colby (National Republican) 4.39%; ▌John Wingate (National Republican) 4.20%; ▌Samuel E. Cones (National Republican) 3.95%; ▌Leonard Wilcox (National Republican) 3.00%; ▌James Wilson (National Republican) 2.77%; ▌John Gould (Anti-Masonic) 1.23%; ▌Caleb Emery (Anti-Masonic) 1.22%; ▌Azel Hatch (Anti-Masonic) 1.21%; ▌Daniel C. Atkinson (Anti-Masonic) 1.20%; ▌William Plumer Jr. (Anti-Masonic) 1.19% |
| New Hampshire at-large 5 seats | Thomas Chandler | Jacksonian | 1829 | Incumbent retired. Jacksonian hold. | |
| New Hampshire at-large 5 seats | Joseph Hammons | Jacksonian | 1829 | Incumbent retired. Jacksonian hold. | |
| New Hampshire at-large 5 seats | Joseph M. Harper | Jacksonian | 1831 | Incumbent re-elected. | |
| New Hampshire at-large 5 seats | Henry Hubbard | Jacksonian | 1829 | Incumbent re-elected. | |

== New Jersey ==
| District | Incumbent | | | This race | |
| District | Member | Party | First elected | Results | Candidates |
|---|---|---|---|---|---|
| New Jersey at-large 6 seats on a general ticket | Silas Condit | National; Republican | 1830 | Incumbent lost re-election. Jacksonian gain. | ▌ ✓ William Shinn (Jacksonian) 51.17%; ▌ ✓ Ferdinand Schenck (Jacksonian) 50.99%; ▌ ✓ Thomas Lee (Jacksonian) 50.96%; ▌ ✓ James Parker (Jacksonian) 50.19%; ▌ ✓ Philemon Dickerson (Jacksonian) 50.11%; ▌ ✓ Samuel Fowler (Jacksonian) 50.00%; ▌Silas Condit (National Republican) 49.95%; ▌Samuel G. Wright (National Republican) 49.94%; ▌William Pennington (National Republican) 49.92%; ▌David Reeves (National Republican) 48.88%; ▌Isaac Southard (National Republican) 48.96%; ▌Samuel W. Budd (National Republican) 48.83% |
| New Jersey at-large 6 seats on a general ticket | Thomas H. Hughes | National; Republican | 1828 | Incumbent retired. Jacksonian gain. | |
| New Jersey at-large 6 seats on a general ticket | James F. Randolph | National; Republican | 1828 (special) | Incumbent retired. Jacksonian gain. | |
| New Jersey at-large 6 seats on a general ticket | Richard M. Cooper | National; Republican | 1828 | Incumbent retired. Jacksonian gain. | |
| New Jersey at-large 6 seats on a general ticket | Isaac Southard | National; Republican | 1830 | Incumbent lost re-election. Jacksonian gain. | |
| New Jersey at-large 6 seats on a general ticket | Lewis Condict | National; Republican | 1821 (special) | Incumbent retired. Jacksonian gain. | |

== New York ==
New York elected its 40 members from November 5 to 7, 1832. It gained seven members from reapportionment. Two members were elected in the 8th, 17th, 22nd, and 23rd districts, while four members were elected in the 3rd district on a general ticket.

| District | Incumbent | | | This race | |
| District | Member | Party | First elected | Results | Candidates |
|---|---|---|---|---|---|
| New York 1 | James Lent | Jacksonian | 1828 | Incumbent retired. Jacksonian hold. | ▌ ✓ Abel Huntington (Jacksonian) 59.9%; ▌David Gardiner (National Republican) 40.1% |
| New York 2 | John T. Bergen | Jacksonian | 1830 | Incumbent retired. Jacksonian hold. | ▌ ✓ Isaac B. Van Houten (Jacksonian) 57.5%; ▌John S. Gurnee (National Republican) 42.5% |
| New York 3 4 seats on a general ticket | Churchill C. Cambreleng | Jacksonian | 1821 | Incumbent re-elected. | ▌ ✓ Cornelius Lawrence (Jacksonian) 15.0%; ▌ ✓ Campbell P. White (Jacksonian) 15.0%; ▌ ✓ Dudley Selden (Jacksonian) 14.8%; ▌ ✓ Churchill C. Cambreleng (Jacksonian) 14.8%; ▌David Ogden (National Republican) 10.2%; ▌Hubert Van Wagenen (National Republican) 10.2%; ▌Jonathan Thompson (National Republican) 10.0%; ▌George F. Talman (National Republican) 10.0% |
| New York 3 4 seats on a general ticket | Campbell P. White | Jacksonian | 1828 | Incumbent re-elected. | ▌ ✓ Cornelius Lawrence (Jacksonian) 15.0%; ▌ ✓ Campbell P. White (Jacksonian) 15.0%; ▌ ✓ Dudley Selden (Jacksonian) 14.8%; ▌ ✓ Churchill C. Cambreleng (Jacksonian) 14.8%; ▌David Ogden (National Republican) 10.2%; ▌Hubert Van Wagenen (National Republican) 10.2%; ▌Jonathan Thompson (National Republican) 10.0%; ▌George F. Talman (National Republican) 10.0% |
| New York 3 4 seats on a general ticket | Gulian C. Verplanck | Jacksonian | 1824 | Incumbent retired. Jacksonian hold. | ▌ ✓ Cornelius Lawrence (Jacksonian) 15.0%; ▌ ✓ Campbell P. White (Jacksonian) 15.0%; ▌ ✓ Dudley Selden (Jacksonian) 14.8%; ▌ ✓ Churchill C. Cambreleng (Jacksonian) 14.8%; ▌David Ogden (National Republican) 10.2%; ▌Hubert Van Wagenen (National Republican) 10.2%; ▌Jonathan Thompson (National Republican) 10.0%; ▌George F. Talman (National Republican) 10.0% |
| New York 3 4 seats on a general ticket | None (new seat) | | | New seat. Jacksonian gain. | ▌ ✓ Cornelius Lawrence (Jacksonian) 15.0%; ▌ ✓ Campbell P. White (Jacksonian) 15.0%; ▌ ✓ Dudley Selden (Jacksonian) 14.8%; ▌ ✓ Churchill C. Cambreleng (Jacksonian) 14.8%; ▌David Ogden (National Republican) 10.2%; ▌Hubert Van Wagenen (National Republican) 10.2%; ▌Jonathan Thompson (National Republican) 10.0%; ▌George F. Talman (National Republican) 10.0% |
| New York 4 | Aaron Ward | Jacksonian | 1830 | Incumbent re-elected. | ▌ ✓ Aaron Ward (Jacksonian) 57.8%; ▌Henry B. Cowles (National Republican) 42.2% |
| New York 5 | Edmund H. Pendleton | National; Republican | 1830 | Incumbent lost re-election. Jacksonian gain. | ▌ ✓ Abraham Bockee (Jacksonian) 52.7%; ▌Edmund H. Pendleton (National Republican) 47.3% |
| New York 6 | Samuel J. Wilkin | National; Republican | 1830 | Incumbent lost re-election. Jacksonian gain. | ▌ ✓ John W. Brown (Jacksonian) 59.0%; ▌Samuel J. Wilkin (National Republican) 41.0% |
| New York 7 | John C. Brodhead | Jacksonian | 1830 | Incumbent retired. Jacksonian hold. | ▌ ✓ Charles Bodle (Jacksonian) 59.7%; ▌Thomas S. Lockwood (National Republican) 40.3% |
| New York 8 2 seats on a general ticket | John King | Jacksonian | 1830 | Incumbent retired. Jacksonian hold. | ▌ ✓ John Adams (Jacksonian) 28.0%; ▌ ✓ Aaron Vanderpoel (Jacksonian) 27.6%; ▌Jedediah Miller (National Republican) 22.4%; ▌John Martin (National Republican) 22.1% |
| New York 8 2 seats on a general ticket | None (new seat) | | | New seat. Jacksonian gain. | ▌ ✓ John Adams (Jacksonian) 28.0%; ▌ ✓ Aaron Vanderpoel (Jacksonian) 27.6%; ▌Jedediah Miller (National Republican) 22.4%; ▌John Martin (National Republican) 22.1% |
| New York 9 | Job Pierson | Jacksonian | 1830 | Incumbent re-elected. | ▌ ✓ Job Pierson (Jacksonian) 53.5%; ▌John D. Dickinson (Anti-Masonic) 46.5% |
| New York 10 | Gerrit Y. Lansing | Jacksonian | 1830 | Incumbent re-elected. | ▌ ✓ Gerrit Y. Lansing (Jacksonian) 51.0%; ▌Ambrose Spencer (Anti-Masonic) 49.0% |
| New York 11 | John W. Taylor; Redistricted from the 17th district | National; Republican | 1812 | Incumbent lost re-election. Jacksonian gain. | ▌ ✓ John Cramer (Jacksonian) 51.6%; ▌John W. Taylor (National Republican) 48.4% |
| New York 12 | Joseph Bouck | Jacksonian | 1830 | Incumbent retired. Anti-Masonic gain. | ▌ ✓ Henry C. Martindale (Anti-Masonic) 44.5%; ▌John McIntyre (Jacksonian) 31.7%; ▌Samuel Stevens (National Republican) 23.7% |
| New York 13 | William G. Angel | Jacksonian | 1828 | Incumbent retired. Jacksonian hold. | ▌ ✓ Reuben Whallon (Jacksonian) 55.2%; ▌Thomas D. Gilson (National Republican) 44.8% |
| New York 14 | Erastus Root; Redistricted from the 11th district | Jacksonian | 1830 | Incumbent retired. Jacksonian hold. | ▌ ✓ Ransom H. Gillet (Jacksonian) 50.5%; ▌Luther Bradish (Anti-Masonic) 49.5% |
| New York 15 | Michael Hoffman | Jacksonian | 1824 | Incumbent retired. Jacksonian hold. | ▌ ✓ Charles McVean (Jacksonian) 56.2%; ▌Howland Fish (National Republican) 43.8% |
| New York 16 | Nathan Soule | Jacksonian | 1830 | Incumbent retired. Jacksonian hold. | ▌ ✓ Abijah Mann Jr. (Jacksonian) 59.6%; ▌Ela Collins (National Republican) 40.4% |
| New York 17 2 seats on a general ticket | Samuel Beardsley; Redistricted from the 14th district | Jacksonian | 1830 | Incumbent re-elected. | ▌ ✓ Samuel Beardsley (Jacksonian) 26.4%; ▌ ✓ Joel Turrill (Jacksonian) 25.2%; ▌Charles P. Kirkland (Anti-Masonic) 24.6%; ▌Peter S. Smith (Anti-Masonic) 23.8% |
| New York 17 2 seats on a general ticket | Nathaniel Pitcher; Redistricted from the 18th district | Jacksonian | 1830 | Incumbent retired. Jacksonian hold. | ▌ ✓ Samuel Beardsley (Jacksonian) 26.4%; ▌ ✓ Joel Turrill (Jacksonian) 25.2%; ▌Charles P. Kirkland (Anti-Masonic) 24.6%; ▌Peter S. Smith (Anti-Masonic) 23.8% |
| New York 18 | Daniel Wardwell; Redistricted from the 20th district | Jacksonian | 1830 | Incumbent re-elected. | ▌ ✓ Daniel Wardwell (Jacksonian) 50.03%; ▌Daniel Lee (Anti-Masonic) 49.97% |
| New York 19 | William Hogan | Jacksonian | 1830 | Incumbent lost renomination. Jacksonian hold. | ▌ ✓ Sherman Page (Jacksonian) 54.9%; ▌John C. Morris (Anti-Masonic) 45.1% |
| New York 20 | John A. Collier; Redistricted from the 21st district | Anti-Masonic | 1830 | Incumbent lost re-election. Jacksonian gain. | ▌ ✓ Noadiah Johnson (Jacksonian) 53.8%; ▌John A. Collier (Anti-Masonic) 46.2% |
| New York 21 | Charles Dayan; Redistricted from the 20th district | Jacksonian | 1830 | Incumbent retired. Jacksonian hold. | ▌ ✓ Henry Mitchell (Jacksonian) 52.6%; ▌Tilly Lynde (Anti-Masonic) 47.4% |
| New York 22 2 seats on a general ticket | Edward C. Reed | Jacksonian | 1830 | Incumbent retired. Jacksonian hold. | ▌ ✓ Nicoll Halsey (Jacksonian) 27.2%; ▌ ✓ Samuel G. Hathaway (Jacksonian) 27.1%; ▌Eleazer W. Edgecomb (Anti-Masonic) 22.9%; ▌Gamaliel H. Barstow (Anti-Masonic) 22.9% |
| New York 22 2 seats on a general ticket | Gamaliel H. Barstow; Redistricted from the 25th district | Anti-Masonic | 1830 | Incumbent lost re-election. Jacksonian gain. | ▌ ✓ Nicoll Halsey (Jacksonian) 27.2%; ▌ ✓ Samuel G. Hathaway (Jacksonian) 27.1%; ▌Eleazer W. Edgecomb (Anti-Masonic) 22.9%; ▌Gamaliel H. Barstow (Anti-Masonic) 22.9% |
| New York 23 2 seats on a general ticket | Freeborn G. Jewett | Jacksonian | 1830 | Incumbent retired. Jacksonian hold. | ▌ ✓ William K. Fuller (Jacksonian) 25.9%; ▌ ✓ William Taylor (Jacksonian) 25.9%; ▌Elijah Rhoades (Anti-Masonic) 24.1%; ▌James B. Eldredge (Anti-Masonic) 24.0% |
| New York 23 2 seats on a general ticket | None (new seat) | | | New seat. Jacksonian gain. | ▌ ✓ William K. Fuller (Jacksonian) 25.9%; ▌ ✓ William Taylor (Jacksonian) 25.9%; ▌Elijah Rhoades (Anti-Masonic) 24.1%; ▌James B. Eldredge (Anti-Masonic) 24.0% |
| New York 24 | Ulysses F. Doubleday | Jacksonian | 1830 | Incumbent retired. Jacksonian hold. | ▌ ✓ Rowland Day (Jacksonian) 53.2%; ▌Laban Hoskins (Anti-Masonic) 46.8% |
| New York 25 | William Babcock; Redistricted from the 26th district | Anti-Masonic | 1830 | Incumbent retired. Jacksonian gain. | ▌ ✓ Samuel Clark (Jacksonian) 52.4%; ▌Joseph S. Cott (Anti-Masonic) 47.6% |
| New York 26 | John Dickson | Anti-Masonic | 1830 | Incumbent re-elected. | ▌ ✓ John Dickson (Anti-Masonic) 62.6%; ▌John Price (Jacksonian) 37.4% |
| New York 27 | Grattan H. Wheeler; Redistricted from the 28th district | Anti-Masonic | 1830 | Incumbent retired. Jacksonian gain. | ▌ ✓ Edward Howell (Jacksonian) 63.2%; ▌William Woods (Anti-Masonic) 36.8% |
| New York 28 | Frederick Whittlesey; Redistricted from the 27th district | Anti-Masonic | 1830 | Incumbent re-elected. | ▌ ✓ Frederick Whittlesey (Anti-Masonic) 58.9%; ▌Isaac Hills (Jacksonian) 41.1% |
| New York 29 | Phineas L. Tracy | Anti-Masonic | 1827 (special) | Incumbent retired. Anti-Masonic hold. | ▌ ✓ George W. Lay (Anti-Masonic) 70.3%; ▌David C. Miller (Jacksonian) 29.7% |
| New York 30 | Bates Cooke | Anti-Masonic | 1830 | Incumbent retired. Anti-Masonic hold. | ▌ ✓ Philo C. Fuller (Anti-Masonic) 57.7%; ▌James Faulkner Jr. (Jacksonian) 42.3% |
| New York 31 | None (new district) | | | New seat. Anti-Masonic gain. | ▌ ✓ Abner Hazeltine (Anti-Masonic) 60.7%; ▌Alson Leavenworth (Jacksonian) 39.3% |
| New York 32 | None (new district) | | | New seat. Anti-Masonic gain. | ▌ ✓ Millard Fillmore (Anti-Masonic) 69.6%; ▌Jonathan Hoyt (Jacksonian) 30.4% |
| New York 33 | None (new district) | | | New seat. Anti-Masonic gain. | ▌ ✓ Gideon Hard (Anti-Masonic) 58.6%; ▌Franklin Butterfield (Jacksonian) 41.4% |

== North Carolina ==
| District | Incumbent | | | This race | |
| District | Member | Party | First elected | Results | Candidates |
|---|---|---|---|---|---|
| North Carolina 1 | William B. Shepard | National Republican | 1829 | Incumbent re-elected. | ▌ ✓ William B. Shepard (National Republican) 100% |
| North Carolina 2 | John Branch Jr. | Jacksonian | 1831 | Incumbent retired. Jacksonian hold. | ▌ ✓ Jesse A. Bynum (Jacksonian) 59.83%; ▌Andrew Joyner (Jacksonian) 40.17% |
| North Carolina 3 | Thomas H. Hall | Jacksonian | 1827 | Incumbent re-elected. | ▌ ✓ Thomas H. Hall (Jacksonian) 100% |
| North Carolina 4 | Jesse Speight | Jacksonian | 1829 | Incumbent re-elected. | ▌ ✓ Jesse Speight (Jacksonian) 100% |
| North Carolina 5 | James I. McKay | Jacksonian | 1831 | Incumbent re-elected. | ▌ ✓ James I. McKay (Jacksonian) 55.56%; ▌Lewis Dishongh (Jacksonian) 44.44% |
North Carolina 6
North Carolina 7
North Carolina 8
North Carolina 9
North Carolina 10
North Carolina 11
| North Carolina 12 | Samuel Price Carson | Jacksonian | 1825 | Incumbent lost re-election. National Republican gain. | ▌ ✓ James Graham (National Republican) 41.6%; ▌Samuel Price Carson (Jacksonian) 30.6%; ▌David Newland (Jacksonian) 27.8% |
North Carolina 13

== Ohio ==
| District | Incumbent | | | This race | |
| District | Member | Party | First elected | Results | Candidates |
Ohio 1
Ohio 2
Ohio 3
Ohio 4
Ohio 5
Ohio 6
Ohio 7
Ohio 8
Ohio 9
Ohio 10
Ohio 11
Ohio 12
Ohio 13
Ohio 14
Ohio 15
Ohio 16
Ohio 17
Ohio 18
Ohio 19

== Pennsylvania ==
Following the reapportionment resulting from the 1830 census, Pennsylvania gained two representatives, increasing from 26 to 28, and was redistricted into 25 districts, two of which were plural districts. Pennsylvania elected its members October 9, 1832.

| District | Incumbent | | | This race | |
| District | Member | Party | First elected | Results | Candidates (Note: For plural districts, percent is based on assumption that each voter cast as many votes as there are seats) |
|---|---|---|---|---|---|
| Pennsylvania 1 | Joel B. Sutherland | Jacksonian | 1826 | Incumbent re-elected. Winner resigned to become a judge, but won re-election to the seat. | ▌ ✓ Joel B. Sutherland (Jacksonian) 50.0%; ▌James Gowen (National Republican) 40.5%; ▌Samuel B. Davis (Jacksonian) 9.5% |
| Pennsylvania 2 Plural district with 2 seats | Henry Horn | Jacksonian | 1830 | Incumbent lost re-election. National Republican gain. | ▌ ✓ Horace Binney (National Republican) 62.9%; ▌ ✓ James Harper (National Republican) 59.9%; ▌Benjamin Richards (Jacksonian) 39.8%; ▌Henry Horn (Jacksonian) 37.4% |
| Pennsylvania 2 Plural district with 2 seats | None (new seat) | | | New seat. National Republican gain. | ▌ ✓ Horace Binney (National Republican) 62.9%; ▌ ✓ James Harper (National Republican) 59.9%; ▌Benjamin Richards (Jacksonian) 39.8%; ▌Henry Horn (Jacksonian) 37.4% |
| Pennsylvania 3 | John G. Watmough | National; Republican | 1830 | Incumbent re-elected. | ▌ ✓ John G. Watmough (National Republican) 53.7%; ▌Jesse R. Burden (Jacksonian) 34.4%; ▌Mahon M. Lewis (Jacksonian) 11.9% |
| Pennsylvania 4 Plural district with 3 seats | William Hiester | Anti-Masonic | 1830 | Incumbent re-elected. | ▌ ✓ William Hiester (Anti-Masonic) 58.5%; ▌ ✓ David Potts Jr. (Anti-Masonic) 58.4%%; ▌ ✓ Edward Darlington (Anti-Masonic) 58.3%; ▌Frederick Hambright (Jacksonian) 41.7%; ▌John Morgan (Jacksonian) 41.6%; ▌Henry Myers (Jacksonian) 41.5% |
| Pennsylvania 4 Plural district with 3 seats | Joshua Evans Jr. | Jacksonian | 1828 | Incumbent retired. Anti-Masonic gain. | ▌ ✓ William Hiester (Anti-Masonic) 58.5%; ▌ ✓ David Potts Jr. (Anti-Masonic) 58.4%%; ▌ ✓ Edward Darlington (Anti-Masonic) 58.3%; ▌Frederick Hambright (Jacksonian) 41.7%; ▌John Morgan (Jacksonian) 41.6%; ▌Henry Myers (Jacksonian) 41.5% |
| Pennsylvania 4 Plural district with 3 seats | David Potts Jr. | Anti-Masonic | 1830 | Incumbent re-elected. | ▌ ✓ William Hiester (Anti-Masonic) 58.5%; ▌ ✓ David Potts Jr. (Anti-Masonic) 58.4%%; ▌ ✓ Edward Darlington (Anti-Masonic) 58.3%; ▌Frederick Hambright (Jacksonian) 41.7%; ▌John Morgan (Jacksonian) 41.6%; ▌Henry Myers (Jacksonian) 41.5% |
| Pennsylvania 5 | Joel K. Mann | Jacksonian | 1830 | Incumbent re-elected. | ▌ ✓ Joel K. Mann (Jacksonian) 54.5%; ▌Benjamin Reiff (Anti-Masonic) 45.5% |
| Pennsylvania 6 | None (new district) | | | New seat. Jacksonian gain. | ▌ ✓ Robert Ramsey (Jacksonian) 43.9%; ▌Mathias Morris (National Republican) 38.6%; ▌Thomas Ross (Anti-Masonic) 17.5% |
| Pennsylvania 7 | Peter Ihrie Jr. Redistricted from the 8th district | Jacksonian | 1829 (special) | Incumbent lost re-election. Jacksonian hold | ▌ ✓ David D. Wagener (Jacksonian) 58.3%; ▌Peter Ihrie Jr. (Anti-Masonic) (Note: Changed parties) 34.7%; ▌Owen Rice (Unknown) 6.9% |
| Pennsylvania 8 | Henry King; Redistricted from the 7th district | Jacksonian | 1830 | Incumbent re-elected. | ▌ ✓ Henry King (Jacksonian) 54.3%; ▌William Audenreid (Anti-Masonic) 45.7% |
| Pennsylvania 9 | Henry A. P. Muhlenberg; Redistricted from the 7th district | Jacksonian | 1828 | Incumbent re-elected. | ▌ ✓ Henry A. P. Muhlenberg (Jacksonian) 57.1%; ▌David Hollenstein (Anti-Masonic) 42.9% |
| Pennsylvania 10 | John C. Bucher; Redistricted from the 6th district | Jacksonian | 1830 | Incumbent lost re-election. Anti-Masonic gain. | ▌ ✓ William Clark (Anti-Masonic) 60.7%; ▌John C. Bucher (Jacksonian) 39.3% |
| Pennsylvania 11 | Adam King; Redistricted from the 10th district | Jacksonian | 1826 | Incumbent lost re-election. Anti-Masonic gain. | ▌ ✓ Charles A. Barnitz (Anti-Masonic) 51.9%; ▌Adam King (Jacksonian) 48.1% |
| Pennsylvania 12 | Thomas H. Crawford; Redistricted from the 11th district | Jacksonian | 1828 | Incumbent lost re-election. Anti-Masonic gain. | ▌ ✓ George Chambers (Anti-Masonic) 55.6%; ▌Thomas H. Crawford (Jacksonian) 44.4% |
| Pennsylvania 13 | None (new district) | | | New seat. Jacksonian gain. | ▌ ✓ Jesse Miller (Jacksonian) 53.8%; ▌Thomas Whiteside (Anti-Masonic) 46.2% |
| Pennsylvania 14 | None (new district) | | | New seat. Jacksonian gain. | ▌ ✓ Joseph Henderson (Jacksonian) 52.9%; ▌James Milliken (Anti-Masonic) 47.1% |
| Pennsylvania 15 | None (new district) | | | New seat. Jacksonian gain. | ▌ ✓ Andrew Beaumont (Jacksonian) 34.8%; ▌Thomas W. Miner (Anti-Masonic/Nat'l Republican) 33.3%; ▌James McClintock (Independent Jacksonian) 31.9% |
| Pennsylvania 16 | None (new district) | | | New seat. Jacksonian gain. | ▌ ✓ Joseph B. Anthony (Jacksonian) 58.1%; ▌Ner Middleswarth (Anti-Masonic) 41.9% |
| Pennsylvania 17 | None (new district) | | | New seat. Jacksonian gain. | ▌ ✓ John Laporte (Jacksonian) 60.3%; ▌Simon Kinney (Anti-Masonic) 39.7% |
| Pennsylvania 18 | George Burd; Redistricted from the 13th district | National; Republican | 1830 | Incumbent re-elected. | ▌ ✓ George Burd (National Republican) 52.0%; ▌David Mann (Anti-Masonic) 48.0% |
| Pennsylvania 19 | Richard Coulter; Redistricted from the 17th district | Jacksonian | 1826 | Incumbent re-elected. | ▌ ✓ Richard Coulter (Jacksonian) 100% |
| Pennsylvania 20 | Andrew Stewart; Redistricted from the 14th district | Anti-Masonic | 1820; 1828 (lost); 1830 | Incumbent re-elected. | ▌ ✓ Andrew Stewart (Anti-Masonic) 51.8%; ▌William G. Hawkins (Jacksonian) 48.8% |
| Pennsylvania 21 | Thomas M. T. McKennan; Redistricted from the 15th district | Anti-Masonic | 1830 | Incumbent re-elected. | ▌ ✓ Thomas M. T. McKennan (Anti-Masonic) 56.1%; ▌William McCreery (Jacksonian) 43.9% |
| Pennsylvania 22 | Harmar Denny; Redistricted from the 16th district | Anti-Masonic | 1829 (special) | Incumbent re-elected. | ▌ ✓ Harmar Denny (Anti-Masonic) 61.2%; ▌William Robinson (Jacksonian) 38.8% |
| Pennsylvania 23 | None (new district) | | | New seat. Jacksonian gain. | ▌ ✓ Samuel S. Harrison (Jacksonian) 61.0%; ▌William Ayers (Anti-Masonic) 39.0% |
| Pennsylvania 24 | John Banks; Redistricted from the 18th district | Anti-Masonic | 1830 | Incumbent re-elected. | ▌ ✓ John Banks (Anti-Masonic) 51.1%; ▌Samuel Power (Jacksonian) 48.9% |
| Pennsylvania 25 | None (new district) | | | New seat. Jacksonian gain. | ▌ ✓ John Galbraith (Jacksonian) 55.2%; ▌Thomas H. Sill (Anti-Masonic) 44.8% |

== Rhode Island ==
| District | Incumbent | | | This race | |
| District | Member | Party | First elected | Results | Candidates |
|---|---|---|---|---|---|
| Rhode Island at-large 2 seats on a general ticket | Tristam Burges | National; Republican | 1825 | Incumbent re-elected. | First ballot (August 27, 1833): ▌ ✓ Tristam Burges (National Republican) 64.91%; ▌Dutee J. Pearce (Anti-Masonic) 42.66%; ▌Wilkins Updike (Jacksonian) 39.09%; ▌Nathan B. Sprague (Jacksonian) 30.77%; ▌Albert C. Greene (National Republican) 11.44%; ▌Henry Y. Cranston (National Republican) 7.70%; ▌Nathan F. Dixon (National Republican) 3.43%; Second ballot (November 20, 1833): ▌ ✓ Dutee J. Pearce (Anti-Masonic) 55.79%; ▌Nathan F. Dixon (Jacksonian) 44.21% |
| Rhode Island at-large 2 seats on a general ticket | Dutee J. Pearce | National; Republican | 1825 | Incumbent switched parties and re-elected. Anti-Masonic gain. | First ballot (August 27, 1833): ▌ ✓ Tristam Burges (National Republican) 64.91%; ▌Dutee J. Pearce (Anti-Masonic) 42.66%; ▌Wilkins Updike (Jacksonian) 39.09%; ▌Nathan B. Sprague (Jacksonian) 30.77%; ▌Albert C. Greene (National Republican) 11.44%; ▌Henry Y. Cranston (National Republican) 7.70%; ▌Nathan F. Dixon (National Republican) 3.43%; Second ballot (November 20, 1833): ▌ ✓ Dutee J. Pearce (Anti-Masonic) 55.79%; ▌Nathan F. Dixon (Jacksonian) 44.21% |

== South Carolina ==
| District | Incumbent | | | This race | |
| District | Member | Party | First elected | Results | Candidates |
South Carolina 1
South Carolina 2
South Carolina 3
South Carolina 4
South Carolina 5
South Carolina 6
South Carolina 7
South Carolina 8
South Carolina 9

== Tennessee ==
Elections held late, from August 1 to August 2, 1833.

| District | Incumbent | | | This race | |
| District | Member | Party | First elected | Results | Candidates |
|---|---|---|---|---|---|
| Tennessee 1 | John Blair | Jacksonian | 1823 | Incumbent re-elected. | ▌ ✓ John Blair (Jacksonian) 42.44%; ▌William B. Carter (Unknown) 34.65%; ▌Thomas D. Arnold (National Republican) 22.91% |
| Tennessee 1 | Thomas D. Arnold; Redistricted from the 2nd district | National; Republican | 1831 | Incumbent lost re-election. National Republican loss. | ▌ ✓ John Blair (Jacksonian) 42.44%; ▌William B. Carter (Unknown) 34.65%; ▌Thomas D. Arnold (National Republican) 22.91% |
| Tennessee 2 | None (new district) | | | New seat. Jacksonian gain. | ▌ ✓ Samuel Bunch (Jacksonian) 70.41%; ▌John Cocke (Unknown) 29.59% |
| Tennessee 3 | None (new district) | | | New seat. Jacksonian gain. | ▌ ✓ Luke Lea (Jacksonian) 46.34%; ▌Joseph L. Williams (Unknown) 29.65%; ▌John F. Gillespie (Unknown) 24.01% |
| Tennessee 4 | James I. Standifer; Redistricted from the 3rd district | Jacksonian | 1829 | Incumbent re-elected. | ▌ ✓ James I. Standifer (Jacksonian) 57.37%; ▌James Greene (Unknown) 42.63% |
| Tennessee 5 | William Hall | Jacksonian | 1831 | Incumbent retired. Jacksonian hold. | ▌ ✓ John B. Forester (Jacksonian) 54.74%; ▌Jacob C. Isacks (Jacksonian) 45.26% |
| Tennessee 5 | Jacob C. Isacks; Redistricted from the 4th district | Jacksonian | 1823 | Incumbent lost re-election. Jacksonian loss. | ▌ ✓ John B. Forester (Jacksonian) 54.74%; ▌Jacob C. Isacks (Jacksonian) 45.26% |
| Tennessee 6 | None (new district) | | | New seat. Jacksonian gain. | ▌ ✓ Balie Peyton (Jacksonian) 74.40%; ▌Archibald Overton (Unknown) 25.60% |
| Tennessee 7 | John Bell | Jacksonian | 1827 | Incumbent re-elected. | ▌ ✓ John Bell (Jacksonian) 100% |
| Tennessee 8 | None (District created) | | | New seat. Jacksonian gain. | ▌ ✓ David W. Dickinson (Jacksonian) 42.35%; ▌William Brady (Unknown) 38.15%; ▌Abram P. Maury (National Republican) 19.50% |
| Tennessee 9 | James K. Polk; Redistricted from the 6th district | Jacksonian | 1825 | Incumbent re-elected. | ▌ ✓ James K. Polk (Jacksonian) 68.52%; ▌Thomas J. Porter (Unknown) 21.81%; ▌Theodorick F. Bradford (Anti-Masonic) 9.68% |
| Tennessee 10 | None (new district) | | | New seat. Jacksonian gain. | ▌ ✓ William M. Inge (Jacksonian) 64.25%; ▌James W. Combs (Unknown) 18.29%; ▌Thomas D. Davenport (Unknown) 17.47% |
| Tennessee 11 | Cave Johnson; Redistricted from the 8th district | Jacksonian | 1829 | Incumbent re-elected. | ▌ ✓ Cave Johnson (Jacksonian) 45.12%; ▌Richard Cheatham (Unknown) 32.02%; ▌John H. Marable (Jacksonian) 22.87% |
| Tennessee 12 | William Fitzgerald; Redistricted from the 9th district | Jacksonian | 1831 | Incumbent lost re-election National Republican gain. | ▌ ✓ Davy Crockett (National Republican) 51.11%; ▌William Fitzgerald (Jacksonian) 48.89% |
| Tennessee 13 | None (new district) | | | New seat. Jacksonian gain. | ▌ ✓ William C. Dunlap (Jacksonian) 36.26%; ▌Christopher H. Williams (Unknown) 33.72%; ▌Adam R. Alexander (Jacksonian) 30.02% |

== Vermont ==
Vermont elected its members January 1, 1833, but two were elected late in the Spring of 1833. The 4th district's election in the previous cycle (1830–1831) went to eleven ballots, so its member wasn't elected until the 1832, near the beginning of this cycle (1832–1833).

| District | Incumbent | | | This race | |
| District | Member | Party | First elected | Results | Candidates |
|---|---|---|---|---|---|
| Vermont 1 | Jonathan Hunt | National; Republican | 1827 | Incumbent died May 15, 1832. Winner also elected the same day to finish the current term. National Republican hold. | ▌ ✓ Hiland Hall (National Republican) 51.4%; ▌Daniel Kellogg (Jacksonian) 28.4%; ▌John Phelps (Anti-Masonic) 11.9%; ▌Orsamus Cook Merrill (Jacksonian) 5.1%; ▌John S. Pettibone (Anti-Masonic) 3.1% |
| Vermont 2 | William Slade | Anti-Masonic | 1831 (special) | Incumbent re-elected. | ▌ ✓ William Slade (Anti-Masonic) 50.0%; ▌Charles K. Williams (National Republican) 33.5%; ▌Charles Linsley (Jacksonian) 16.1% |
| Vermont 3 | Horace Everett | National; Republican | 1828 | Incumbent re-elected on the third ballot. | First ballot (January 1, 1833): ▌Titus Hutchinson (Anti-Masonic) 41.4%; ▌Horace Everett (National Republican) 27.5%; ▌D. Azro A. Buck (Jacksonian) 26.3%; ▌Isaac N. Cushman (National Republican) 4.3%; Second ballot (March 5, 1833): ▌Titus Hutchinson (Anti-Masonic) 38.6%; ▌Horace Everett (National Republican) 32.6%; ▌D. Azro A. Buck (Jacksonian) 28.8%; Third ballot (May 7, 1833): ▌ ✓ Horace Everett (National Republican) 43.3%; ▌Titus Hutchinson (Anti-Masonic) 39.5%; ▌D. Azro A. Buck (Jacksonian) 17.2% |
| Vermont 4 | Heman Allen | National; Republican | 1832 (late) | Incumbent re-elected. | ▌ ✓ Heman Allen (National Republican) 57.7%; ▌Luther B. Hunt (Jacksonian) 28.5%; ▌Joel Barber (Anti-Masonic) 10.8% |
| Vermont 5 | William Cahoon | Anti-Masonic | 1829 | Incumbent lost re-election. New member elected on the second ballot. Anti-Masonic hold. | First ballot (January 1, 1833): ▌Benjamin F. Deming (Anti-Masonic) 47.8%; ▌Azel Spaulding (Jacksonian) 32.5%; ▌James Bell (National Republican) 13.5%; Second ballot (March 5, 1833): ▌ ✓ Benjamin F. Deming (Anti-Masonic) 55.6%; ▌Jonathan P. Miller (Jacksonian) 34.0%; ▌Isaac Fletcher (Jacksonian) 5.5%; ▌James Bell (National Republican) 3.1%; ▌Azel Spaulding (Jacksonian) 1.8% |

== Virginia ==
| District | Incumbent | | | This race | |
| District | Member | Party | First elected | Results | Candidates |
|---|---|---|---|---|---|
| Virginia 1 | Thomas Newton Jr. | National; Republican | 1831 | Incumbent lost re-election. Jacksonian gain. | ▌ ✓ George Loyall (Jacksonian) 53.0%; ▌Thomas Newton Jr. (National Republican) 47.0% |
| Virginia 2 | John Y. Mason | Jacksonian | 1831 | Incumbent re-elected. | ▌ ✓ John Y. Mason (Jacksonian) 100% |
| Virginia 3 | William S. Archer | Jacksonian | 1820 (special) | Incumbent re-elected. | ▌ ✓ William S. Archer (Jacksonian) 100% |
| Virginia 4 | Mark Alexander | Jacksonian | 1819 | Incumbent retired. National Republican gain. | ▌ ✓ James Gholson (National Republican) 37.6%; ▌George Dromgoole (Jacksonian) 34.1%; ▌William Osborne Goode (Unknown) 26.2%; ▌Alexander G. Knox (Unknown) 2.1% |
| Virginia 5 | Thomas Bouldin | Jacksonian | 1829 | Incumbent lost renomination. Jacksonian hold. | ▌ ✓ John Randolph (Jacksonian) 100% |
| Virginia 6 | Thomas Davenport | Jacksonian | 1825 | Incumbent re-elected as a National Republican. National Republican gain. | ▌ ✓ Thomas Davenport (National Republican) 51.0%; ▌Benjamin S. W. Cabell (Jacksonian) 49.0% |
| Virginia 7 | Nathaniel Claiborne | Jacksonian | 1825 | Incumbent re-elected. | ▌ ✓ Nathaniel Claiborne (Jacksonian) 100% |
| Virginia 8 | Richard Coke Jr. | Jacksonian | 1829 | Incumbent lost re-election as a National Republican. Jacksonian hold. | ▌ ✓ Henry A. Wise (Jacksonian) 58.7%; ▌Richard Coke Jr. (National Republican) 41.3% |
| Virginia 9 | John J. Roane; Redistricted from the 12th district | Jacksonian | 1831 | Incumbent lost re-election. National Republican gain. | ▌ ✓ William P. Taylor (National Republican) 53.5%; ▌John J. Roane (Jacksonian) 37.5%; ▌Edwin Upshaw (Unknown) 9.1% |
| Virginia 10 | Joseph Chinn; Redistricted from the 13th district | Jacksonian | 1831 | Incumbent re-elected. | ▌ ✓ Joseph Chinn (Jacksonian) 54.7%; ▌John Taliaferro (National Republican) 45.3% |
| Virginia 11 | Andrew Stevenson; Redistricted from the 9th district | Jacksonian | 1821 | Incumbent re-elected. | ▌ ✓ Andrew Stevenson (Jacksonian) 62.3%; ▌John Robertson (National Republican) 37.7% |
| Virginia 12 | William F. Gordon; Redistricted from the 10th district | Jacksonian | 1829 (special) | Incumbent retired. Jacksonian hold. | ▌ ✓ William F. Gordon (Jacksonian) 100% |
| Virginia 13 | John M. Patton; Redistricted from the 11th district | Jacksonian | 1830 (special) | Incumbent re-elected. | ▌ ✓ John M. Patton (Jacksonian) 100% |
| Virginia 14 | Charles F. Mercer | National; Republican | 1817 | Incumbent re-elected. | ▌ ✓ Charles F. Mercer (National Republican) 51.9%; ▌Richard C. Mason (Jacksonian) 48.1% |
| Virginia 15 | John S. Barbour | Jacksonian | 1823 | Incumbent retired. Jacksonian hold. | ▌ ✓ Edward Lucas (Jacksonian) 57.5%; ▌Augustus C. Smith (Unknown) 35.6%; ▌William Naylor (Unknown) 6.9% |
| Virginia 16 | William Armstrong | National; Republican | 1825 | Incumbent retired. Jacksonian gain. | ▌ ✓ James M. H. Beale (Jacksonian) 56.2%; ▌James Steele (Unknown) 39.7%; ▌Michael Meyerhoeffer (Unknown) 4.1% |
| Virginia 17 | Robert Allen | Jacksonian | 1827 | Incumbent retired. Jacksonian loss. | ▌ ✓ Samuel M. Moore (National Republican) 50.9%; ▌Robert Craig (Jacksonian) 49.1% |
| Virginia 17 | Robert Craig; Redistricted from the 20th district | Jacksonian | 1829 | Incumbent lost re-election. National Republican gain. | ▌ ✓ Samuel M. Moore (National Republican) 50.9%; ▌Robert Craig (Jacksonian) 49.1% |
| Virginia 18 | Joseph Johnson | Jacksonian | 1833 (special) | Incumbent retired. Jacksoninan hold. | ▌ ✓ John H. Fulton (Jacksonian) 67.6%; ▌William Byers (Unknown) 32.4% |
| Virginia 19 | William McCoy | Jacksonian | 1811 | Incumbent retired. Jacksoninan hold. | ▌ ✓ William McComas (Jacksonian) 60.6%; ▌William L. Smith (Unknown) 39.4% |
| Virginia 20 | Lewis Maxwell; Redistricted from the 21st district | National; Republican | 1827 | Incumbent lost re-election. National Republican hold. | ▌ ✓ John J. Allen (National Republican) 71.0%; ▌Lewis Maxwell (National Republican) 29.0% |
| Virginia 21 | None (new district) | | | New district. National Republican gain. | ▌ ✓ Edgar C. Wilson (National Republican) 50.1%; ▌William S. Morgan (Jacksonian) 49.9% |
| Virginia 22 | Joseph Draper | Jacksonian | 1830 (special); 1832 (retired); 1832 (special) | Incumbent retired. District eliminated. Jacksonian loss. | None |

== Non-voting delegates ==
=== Arkansas Territory ===
| District | Incumbent | | | This race | |
| District | Delegate | Party | First elected | Results | Candidates |
|---|---|---|---|---|---|
| Arkansas Territory at-large | Ambrose H. Sevier | Jacksonian | 1828 (special) | Incumbent re-elected on an unknown date. | ▌ ✓ Ambrose H. Sevier (Jacksonian); [data missing] |

=== Florida Territory ===
| District | Incumbent | | | This race | |
| District | Delegate | Party | First elected | Results | Candidates |
|---|---|---|---|---|---|
| Florida Territory at-large | Joseph M. White | Jacksonian | 1825 | Incumbent re-elected on an unknown date. | ▌ ✓ Joseph M. White (Jacksonian); [data missing] |

=== Michigan Territory ===
| District | Incumbent | | | This race | |
| District | Delegate | Party | First elected | Results | Candidates |
|---|---|---|---|---|---|
| Michigan Territory at-large | Austin Eli Wing | Jacksonian | 1830 or 1831 | Incumbent retired. Jacksonian hold. | ▌ ✓ Lucius Lyon (Jacksonian); [data missing] |

== See also ==
- 1832 United States elections
  - List of United States House of Representatives elections (1824–1854)
  - 1832 United States presidential election
  - 1832–33 United States Senate elections
- 22nd United States Congress
- 23rd United States Congress

== Bibliography ==
- Dubin, Michael J. (March 1, 1998). United States Congressional Elections, 1788-1997: The Official Results of the Elections of the 1st Through 105th Congresses. McFarland and Company. ISBN 978-0786402830.
- Martis, Kenneth C. (January 1, 1989). The Historical Atlas of Political Parties in the United States Congress, 1789-1989. Macmillan Publishing Company. ISBN 978-0029201701.
- Moore, John L., ed. (1994). Congressional Quarterly's Guide to U.S. Elections (Third ed.). Congressional Quarterly Inc. ISBN 978-0871879967.
- "Party Divisions of the House of Representatives* 1789–Present". Office of the Historian, House of United States House of Representatives.
