= 22nd United States Congress =

1831-1833 U.S. Congress

←	21st	23rd	→
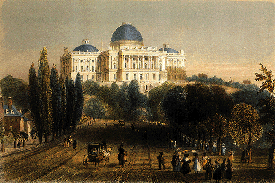
- United States Capitol (1827)

Overview
- Legislative body: United States Congress
- Jurisdiction: United States
- Term: March 4, 1831 – March 4, 1833

Senate
- Members: 48
- President: John C. Calhoun (J) (until December 28, 1832); Vacant (from December 28, 1832)
- President pro tempore: Samuel Smith (J); Littleton Tazewell (J); Hugh L. White (J)
- Party control: Jacksonian (usually a plurality, otherwise a VP-tie-breaking majority)

House of Representatives
- Members: 213 representatives 3 non-voting delegates
- Speaker: Andrew Stevenson (J)
- Party control: Jacksonian

Sessions
- 1st: December 5, 1831 – July 16, 1832
- 2nd: December 3, 1832 – March 2, 1833

The 22nd United States Congress was a meeting of the legislative branch of the United States federal government, consisting of the United States Senate and the United States House of Representatives. It met in Washington, D.C. from March 4, 1831, to March 4, 1833, during the third and fourth years of Andrew Jackson's presidency. The apportionment of seats in the House of Representatives was based on the 1820 United States census. Both chambers had a Jacksonian majority.

== Major events ==
- December 28, 1832: Vice President John C. Calhoun resigned. The first Vice President of the United States to do so.
- Nullification Crisis

== Major legislation ==
- July 14, 1832: Tariff of 1832, ch. 227, 4 Stat. 583
- March 2, 1833: Tariff of 1833 (Compromise Tariff), ch. 55, 4 Stat. 629
- March 2, 1833: Force Bill, ch. 57, 4 Stat. 632

== Party summary ==
The count below identifies party affiliations at the beginning of the first session of this congress. Changes resulting from subsequent replacements are shown below in the "Changes in membership" section.

=== Senate ===
Senate membership

Beginning of the Congress

End of the Congress

	Party (shading shows control)			Total	Vacant
	National Republican (NR)	Jacksonian (J)	Nullifier (N)	Total	Vacant
End of previous congress	22	25	0	47	1
Begin	20	24	2	46	2
End	22	24	1	47	1
Final voting share	46.8%	51.1%	2.1%		
Beginning of next congress	25	20	1	46	2

=== House of Representatives ===
House membership

Beginning of the Congress

Ending of the Congress

	Party (shading shows control)				Total	Vacant
	National Republican (NR)	Anti- Masonic (AM)	Jacksonian (J)	Nullifier (N)	Total	Vacant
End of previous congress	72	6	134	0	212	1
Begin	65	16	127	4	212	1
End	63	17	128	4	212	1
Final voting share	29.7%	8.0%	60.4%	1.9%		
Beginning of next congress	62	25	144	9	240	0

== Leadership ==
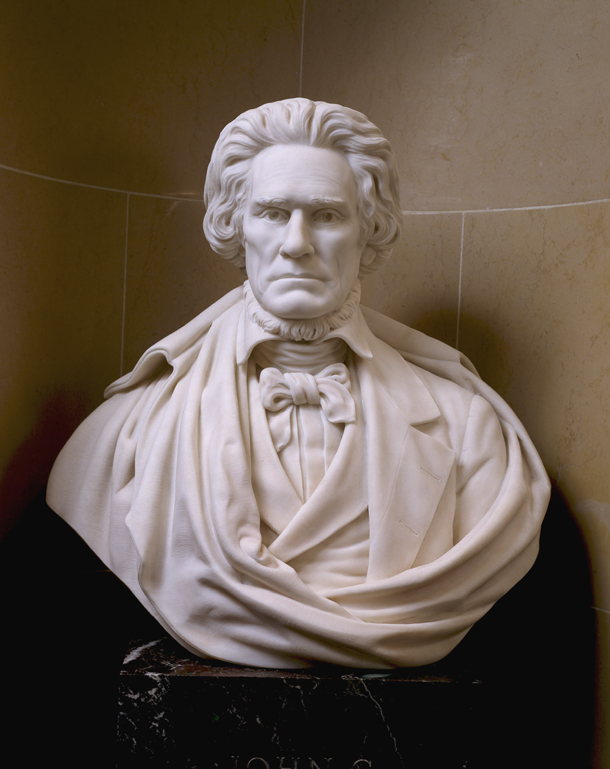
President of the Senate John C. Calhoun

=== Senate ===
- President: John C. Calhoun (J), resigned December 28, 1832; thereafter vacant.
- President pro tempore: Samuel Smith (J), first elected December 5, 1831
  - Littleton W. Tazewell (J), elected July 9, 1832
  - Hugh Lawson White (J), elected December 3, 1832

=== House of Representatives ===
- Speaker: Andrew Stevenson (J)

== Members ==
This list is arranged by chamber, then by state. Senators are listed in order of seniority, and representatives are listed by district.

Skip to House of Representatives, below

=== Senate ===
Senators were elected by the state legislatures every two years, with one-third beginning new six-year terms with each Congress. Preceding the names in the list below are Senate class numbers, which indicate the cycle of their election. In this Congress, Class 1 meant their term ended with this Congress, requiring re-election in 1832; Class 2 meant their term began in the last Congress, requiring re-election in 1834; and Class 3 meant their term began in this Congress, requiring re-election in 1836.

==== Alabama ====
▌2. William R. King (J)
▌3. Gabriel Moore (J)

==== Connecticut ====
▌1. Samuel A. Foot (NR)
▌3. Gideon Tomlinson (NR)

==== Delaware ====
▌1. Arnold Naudain (NR)
▌2. John M. Clayton (NR)

==== Georgia ====
▌2. George M. Troup (J)
▌3. John Forsyth (J)

==== Illinois ====
▌2. John M. Robinson (J)
▌3. Elias K. Kane (J)

==== Indiana ====
▌1. Robert Hanna (NR), from August 19, 1831 - January 3, 1832

▌John Tipton (J), from January 3, 1832

▌3. William Hendricks (NR)

==== Kentucky ====
▌2. George M. Bibb (J)
▌3. Henry Clay (NR), from November 10, 1831

==== Louisiana ====
▌2. Edward Livingston (J), until May 24, 1831

▌George A. Waggaman (NR), from November 15, 1831

▌3. Josiah S. Johnston (NR)

==== Maine ====
▌1. John Holmes (NR)
▌2. Peleg Sprague (NR)

==== Maryland ====
▌1. Samuel Smith (J)
▌3. Ezekiel F. Chambers (NR)

==== Massachusetts ====
▌1. Daniel Webster (NR)
▌2. Nathaniel Silsbee (NR)

==== Mississippi ====
▌1. Powhatan Ellis (J), until July 16, 1832

▌John Black (J), from November 12, 1832

▌2. George Poindexter (NR)

==== Missouri ====
▌1. Thomas H. Benton (J)
▌3. Alexander Buckner (J)

==== New Hampshire ====
▌2. Samuel Bell (NR)
▌3. Isaac Hill (J)

==== New Jersey ====
▌1. Mahlon Dickerson (J)
▌2. Theodore Frelinghuysen (NR)

==== New York ====
▌1. Charles E. Dudley (J)
▌3. William L. Marcy (J), until January 1, 1833

▌Silas Wright Jr. (J), from January 4, 1833

==== North Carolina ====
▌2. Bedford Brown (J)
▌3. Willie P. Mangum (J)

==== Ohio ====
▌1. Benjamin Ruggles (NR)
▌3. Thomas Ewing (NR)

==== Pennsylvania ====
▌1. Isaac D. Barnard (J), until December 6, 1831

▌George M. Dallas (J), from December 13, 1831

▌3. William Wilkins (J)

==== Rhode Island ====
▌1. Asher Robbins (NR)
▌2. Nehemiah R. Knight (NR)

==== South Carolina ====
▌2. Robert Y. Hayne (N), until December 3, 1832

▌John C. Calhoun (N), from December 29, 1832

▌3. Stephen D. Miller (N), until March 2, 1833, vacant for remainder of term

==== Tennessee ====
▌1. Felix Grundy (J)
▌2. Hugh Lawson White (J)

==== Vermont ====
▌1. Horatio Seymour (NR)
▌3. Samuel Prentiss (NR)

==== Virginia ====
▌1. John Tyler (J)
▌2. Littleton W. Tazewell (J), until July 16, 1832

▌William C. Rives (J), from December 10, 1832

Senators' party membership by state at the opening of the 22nd Congress in March 1831. 2 Jacksonians 1 Jacksonian and 1 Anti-Jacksonian 2 Anti-Jacksonians 2 Nullifiers

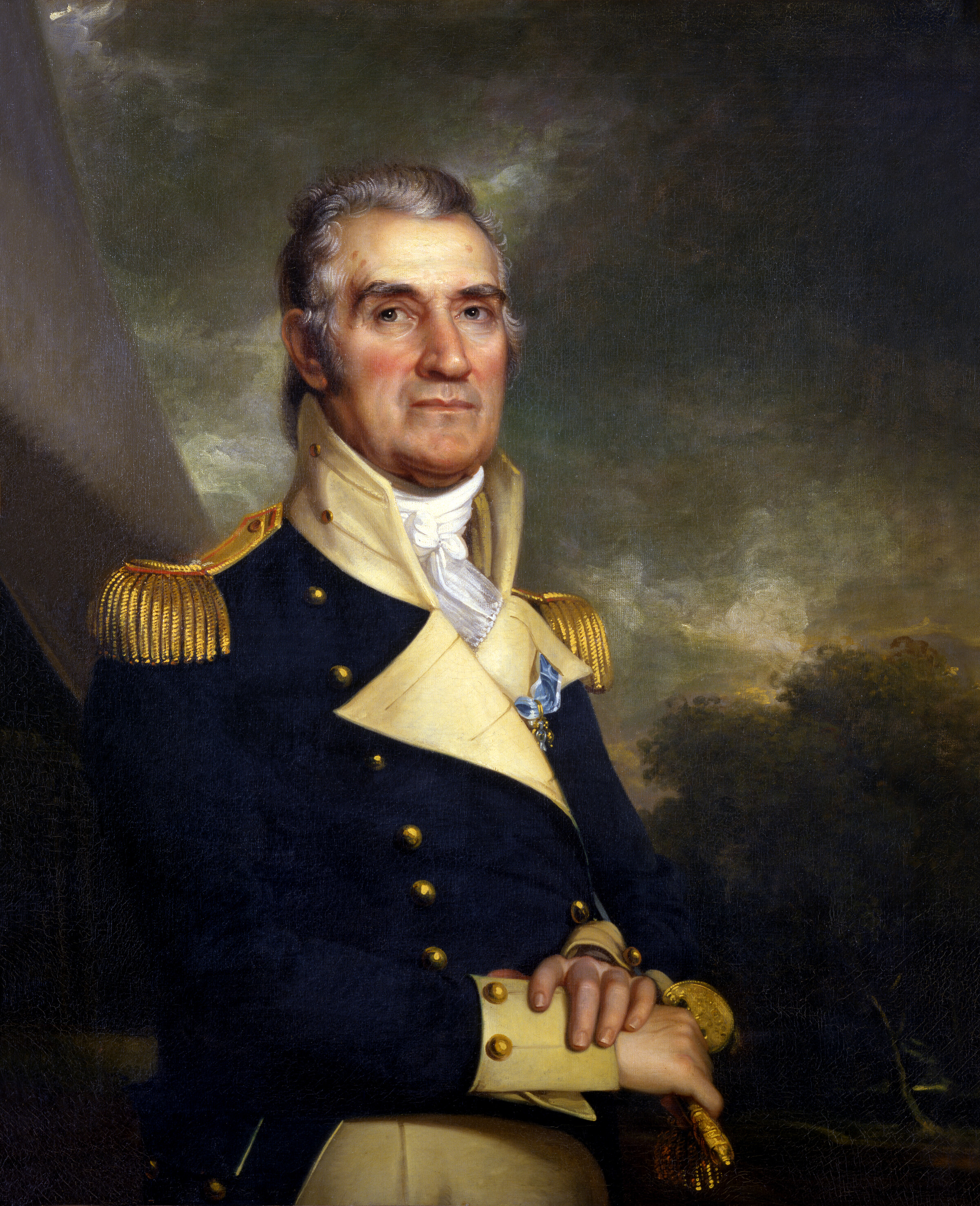
President pro tempore Samuel Smith

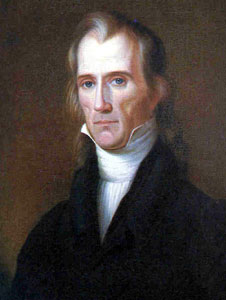
President pro tempore Hugh Lawson White

=== House of Representatives ===
The names of representatives are preceded by their district numbers.

==== Alabama ====
▌1. Clement C. Clay (J)
▌2. Samuel W. Mardis (J)
▌3. Dixon H. Lewis (J)

==== Connecticut ====
All representatives were elected statewide on a general ticket.

▌At-large. Noyes Barber (NR)
▌At-large. William W. Ellsworth (NR)
▌At-large. Jabez W. Huntington (NR)
▌At-large. Ralph I. Ingersoll (NR)
▌At-large. William L. Storrs (NR)
▌At-large. Ebenezer Young (NR)

==== Delaware ====
▌At-large. John J. Milligan (NR)

==== Georgia ====
All representatives were elected statewide on a general ticket.

▌At-large. Thomas F. Foster (J)
▌At-large. Henry G. Lamar (J)
▌At-large. Wilson Lumpkin (J), until ????, 1831

▌Augustin S. Clayton (J), from January 21, 1832

▌At-large. Daniel Newnan (J)
▌At-large. Wiley Thompson (J)
▌At-large. James M. Wayne (J)
▌At-large. Richard Henry Wilde (J)

==== Illinois ====
▌At-large. Joseph Duncan (J)

==== Indiana ====
▌1. Ratliff Boon (J)
▌2. John Carr (J)
▌3. Johnathan McCarty (J)

==== Kentucky ====
▌1. Henry Daniel (J)
▌2. Thomas A. Marshall (NR)
▌3. Chilton Allan (NR)
▌4. Robert P. Letcher (NR)
▌5. Richard M. Johnson (J)
▌6. Joseph Lecompte (J)
▌7. John Adair (J)
▌8. Nathan Gaither (J)
▌9. Charles A. Wickliffe (J)
▌10. Christopher Tompkins (NR)
▌11. Albert G. Hawes (J)
▌12. Chittenden Lyon (J)

==== Louisiana ====
▌1. Edward D. White (NR)
▌2. Philemon Thomas (J)
▌3. Henry A. Bullard (NR)

==== Maine ====
▌1. Rufus McIntire (J)
▌2. John Anderson (J)
▌3. Edward Kavanagh (J)
▌4. George Evans (NR)
▌5. Cornelius Holland (J)
▌6. Leonard Jarvis (J)
▌7. James Bates (J)

==== Maryland ====
The 5th district was a plural district with two representatives.

▌1. Daniel Jenifer (NR)
▌2. Benedict J. Semmes (NR)
▌3. George C. Washington (NR)
▌4. Francis Thomas (J)
▌5. Benjamin C. Howard (J)
▌5. John T. H. Worthington (J)
▌6. George E. Mitchell (J), until June 28, 1832

▌Charles S. Sewall (J), from October 1, 1832

▌7. John L. Kerr (NR)
▌8. John S. Spence (NR)

==== Massachusetts ====
▌1. Nathan Appleton (NR)
▌2. Rufus Choate (NR)
▌3. Jeremiah Nelson (NR)
▌4. Edward Everett (NR)
▌5. John Davis (NR)
▌6. Joseph G. Kendall (NR)
▌7. George J. Grennell Jr. (NR)
▌8. Isaac C. Bates (NR)
▌9. George N. Briggs (NR)
▌10. Henry A. S. Dearborn (NR)
▌11. John Quincy Adams (NR)
▌12. James L. Hodges (NR)
▌13. John Reed Jr. (NR)

==== Mississippi ====
▌At-large. Franklin E. Plummer (J)

==== Missouri ====
▌At-large. Spencer D. Pettis (J), until August 28, 1831

▌William H. Ashley (J), from October 31, 1831

==== New Hampshire ====
All representatives were elected statewide on a general ticket.

▌At-large. John Brodhead (J)
▌At-large. Thomas Chandler (J)
▌At-large. Joseph Hammons (J)
▌At-large. Joseph M. Harper (J)
▌At-large. Henry Hubbard (J)
▌At-large. John W. Weeks (J)

==== New Jersey ====
All representatives were elected statewide on a general ticket.

▌At-large. Lewis Condict (NR)
▌At-large. Silas Condit (NR)
▌At-large. Richard M. Cooper (NR)
▌At-large. Thomas H. Hughes (NR)
▌At-large. James F. Randolph (NR)
▌At-large. Isaac Southard (NR)

==== New York ====
There were three plural districts, the 20th & 26th had two representatives each, the 3rd had three representatives.

▌1. James Lent (J), until February 22, 1833, vacant thereafter
▌2. John T. Bergen (J)
▌3. Churchill C. Cambreleng (J)
▌3. Gulian C. Verplanck (J)
▌3. Campbell P. White (J)
▌4. Aaron Ward (J)
▌5. Edmund H. Pendleton (NR)
▌6. Samuel J. Wilkin (NR)
▌7. John C. Brodhead (J)
▌8. John King (J)
▌9. Job Pierson (J)
▌10. Gerrit Y. Lansing (J)
▌11. Erastus Root (J)
▌12. Joseph Bouck (J)
▌13. William G. Angel (J)
▌14. Samuel Beardsley (J)
▌15. Michael Hoffman (J)
▌16. Nathan Soule (J)
▌17. John W. Taylor (NR)
▌18. Nathaniel Pitcher (J)
▌19. William Hogan (J)
▌20. Charles Dayan (J)
▌20. Daniel Wardwell (J)
▌21. John A. Collier (Anti-M)
▌22. Edward C. Reed (J)
▌23. Freeborn G. Jewett (J)
▌24. Ulysses F. Doubleday (J)
▌25. Gamaliel H. Barstow (Anti-M)
▌26. William Babcock (Anti-M)
▌26. John Dickson (Anti-M)
▌27. Frederick Whittlesey (Anti-M)
▌28. Grattan H. Wheeler (Anti-M)
▌29. Phineas L. Tracy (Anti-M)
▌30. Bates Cooke (Anti-M)

==== North Carolina ====
▌1. William B. Shepard (NR)
▌2. John Branch (J), from May 12, 1831
▌3. Thomas H. Hall (J)
▌4. Jesse Speight (J)
▌5. James I. McKay (J)
▌6. Robert Potter (J), until November ????, 1831

▌Micajah T. Hawkins (J), from December 15, 1831

▌7. Lauchlin Bethune (J)
▌8. Daniel L. Barringer (J)
▌9. Augustine H. Shepperd (J)
▌10. Abraham Rencher (J)
▌11. Henry W. Connor (J)
▌12. Samuel P. Carson (J)
▌13. Lewis Williams (NR)

==== Ohio ====
▌1. James Findlay (J)
▌2. Thomas Corwin (NR)
▌3. Joseph H. Crane (NR)
▌4. Joseph Vance (NR)
▌5. William Russell (J)
▌6. William Creighton Jr. (NR)
▌7. Samuel F. Vinton (NR)
▌8. William Stanbery (NR)
▌9. William W. Irvin (J)
▌10. William Kennon Sr. (J)
▌11. Humphrey H. Leavitt (J)
▌12. John Thomson (J)
▌13. Elisha Whittlesey (NR)
▌14. Eleutheros Cooke (NR)

==== Pennsylvania ====
There were six plural districts, the 7th, 8th, 11th & 16th had two representatives each, the 4th & 9th had three representatives each.

▌1. Joel B. Sutherland (J)
▌2. Henry Horn (J)
▌3. John G. Watmough (NR)
▌4. Joshua Evans Jr. (J)
▌4. William Hiester (Anti-M)
▌4. David Potts Jr. (Anti-M)
▌5. Joel K. Mann (J)
▌6. John C. Bucher (J)
▌7. Henry King (J)
▌7. Henry A. P. Muhlenberg (J)
▌8. Peter Ihrie Jr. (J)
▌8. Samuel A. Smith (J)
▌9. Lewis Dewart (J)
▌9. James Ford (J)
▌9. Philander Stephens (J)
▌10. Adam King (J)
▌11. Thomas H. Crawford (J)
▌11. William Ramsey (J), until September 29, 1831

▌Robert McCoy (J), from November 22, 1831

▌12. Robert Allison (Anti-M)
▌13. George Burd (NR)
▌14. Andrew Stewart (Anti-M)
▌15. Thomas M.T. McKennan (Anti-M)
▌16. Harmar Denny (Anti-M)
▌16. John Gilmore (J)
▌17. Richard Coulter (J)
▌18. John Banks (Anti-M)

==== Rhode Island ====
Both representatives were elected statewide on a general ticket.

▌At-large. Tristam Burges (NR)
▌At-large. Dutee J. Pearce (NR)

==== South Carolina ====
▌1. William Drayton (J)
▌2. Robert W. Barnwell (N)
▌3. Thomas R. Mitchell (J)
▌4. John Myers Felder (J)
▌5. George McDuffie (N)
▌6. Warren R. Davis (N)
▌7. William T. Nuckolls (J)
▌8. James Blair (J)
▌9. John K. Griffin (N)

==== Tennessee ====
▌1. John Blair (J)
▌2. Thomas D. Arnold (NR)
▌3. James I. Standifer (J)
▌4. Jacob C. Isacks (J)
▌5. William Hall (J)
▌6. James K. Polk (J)
▌7. John Bell (J)
▌8. Cave Johnson (J)
▌9. William Fitzgerald (J)

==== Vermont ====
▌1. Jonathan Hunt (NR), until May 15, 1832

▌Hiland Hall (NR), from January 1, 1833

▌2. Rollin C. Mallary (NR), until April 15, 1831

▌William Slade (Anti-M), from November 1, 1831

▌3. Horace Everett (NR)
▌4. Heman Allen (NR)
▌5. William Cahoon (Anti-M)

==== Virginia ====
▌1. Thomas Newton Jr. (NR)
▌2. John Y. Mason (J)
▌3. William S. Archer (J)
▌4. Mark Alexander (J)
▌5. Thomas T. Bouldin (J)
▌6. Thomas Davenport (J)
▌7. Nathaniel H. Claiborne (J)
▌8. Richard Coke Jr. (J)
▌9. Andrew Stevenson (J)
▌10. William F. Gordon (J)
▌11. John M. Patton (J)
▌12. John J. Roane (J)
▌13. Joseph W. Chinn (J)
▌14. Charles F. Mercer (NR)
▌15. John S. Barbour (J)
▌16. William Armstrong (NR)
▌17. Robert Allen (J)
▌18. Philip Doddridge (NR), until November 19, 1832

▌Joseph Johnson (J), from January 21, 1833

▌19. William McCoy (J)
▌20. Robert Craig (J)
▌21. Lewis Maxwell (NR)
▌22. Charles C. Johnston (J), until June 17, 1832

▌Joseph Draper (J), from December 6, 1832

==== Non-voting members ====
▌Arkansas Territory. Ambrose H. Sevier (J)
Florida Territory. Joseph M. White
Michigan Territory. Austin E. Wing

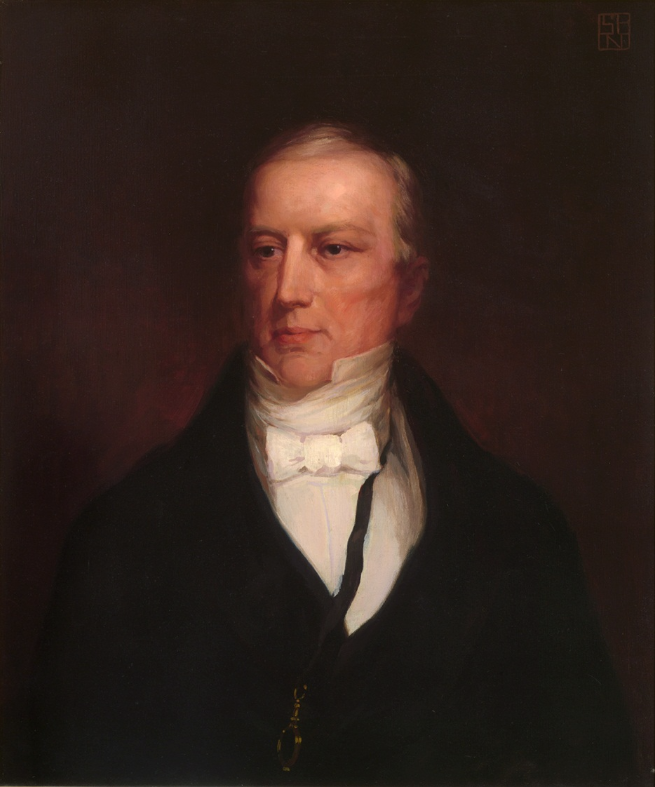
Speaker of the House Andrew Stevenson

== Changes in membership ==
These counts reflect changes from the beginning of the first session of this Congress.

=== Senate ===
- Replacements: 7
  - Jacksonians: no net change
  - National Republicans: no net change
  - Nullifiers: no net change
- Deaths: 0
- Resignations: 7
- Interim appointments: 1
- Total seats with changes: 9

Senate changes
State (class)	Vacated by	Reason for change	Successor	Date of successor's formal installation (Note: When seated or oath administered, not necessarily when service began.)
Indiana (1)	Vacant	James Noble had died February 26, 1831, in the previous Congress. Successor appointed August 19, 1831.	Robert Hanna (NR)	Installed August 19, 1831
Kentucky (3)	Vacant	Legislature elected late November 10, 1831.	Henry Clay (NR)	Installed November 10, 1831
Louisiana (2)	Edward Livingston (J)	Resigned May 24, 1831, after being appointed U.S. Secretary of State. Successor elected November 15, 1831.	George A. Waggaman (NR)	Installed November 15, 1831
Pennsylvania (1)	Isaac D. Barnard (J)	Resigned December 6, 1831, due to ill health. Successor elected December 13, 1831.	George M. Dallas (J)	Installed December 13, 1831
Indiana (1)	Robert Hanna (NR)	Appointee retired when elected successor qualified. Successor elected January 3, 1832.	John Tipton (J)	Installed January 3, 1832
Mississippi (1)	Powhatan Ellis (J)	Resigned July 16, 1832, after being appointed U.S. District Judge. Successor appointed November 12, 1832, to finish the term.	John Black (J)	Installed November 12, 1832
Virginia (2)	Littleton Waller Tazewell (J)	Resigned July 16, 1832. Successor elected December 10, 1832.	William C. Rives (J)	Installed December 10, 1832
South Carolina (2)	Robert Y. Hayne (N)	Resigned December 13, 1832, to become Governor of South Carolina. Successor elected December 29, 1832.	John C. Calhoun (N)	Installed December 29, 1832
New York (3)	William L. Marcy (J)	Resigned January 1, 1833, after becoming Governor of New York. Successor elected January 14, 1833.	Silas Wright (J)	Installed January 4, 1833
South Carolina (3)	Stephen D. Miller (N)	Resigned March 2, 1833, due to ill health.	Vacant	Not filled this term

=== House of Representatives ===
- Replacements: 9
  - Jacksonians: 1-seat net gain
  - National Republicans: 2-seat net loss
  - Anti-Masonics: 1-seat net gain
- Deaths: 8
- Resignations: 2
- Contested election: 0
- Total seats with changes: 11

House changes
District	Vacated by	Reason for change	Successor	Date of successor's formal installation
North Carolina 2nd	Vacant	Vacancy in term	John Branch (J)	Seated May 12, 1831
Georgia at-large	Wilson Lumpkin (J)	Resigned some time in 1831 before the convening of Congress	Augustin S. Clayton (J)	Seated January 21, 1832
Vermont 2nd	Rollin C. Mallary (NR)	Died April 15, 1831	William Slade (AM)	Seated November 1, 1831
Missouri at-large	Spencer D. Pettis (NR)	Died August 28, 1831	William H. Ashley (NR)	Seated October 31, 1831
Pennsylvania 11th	William Ramsey (J)	Died September 29, 1831	Robert McCoy (J)	Seated November 22, 1831
North Carolina 6th	Robert Potter (J)	Resigned November ????, 1831	Micajah T. Hawkins (J)	Seated December 15, 1831
Vermont 1st	Jonathan Hunt (NR)	Died May 15, 1832. A special election was held and a new member elected January 1, 1833 on the fourth ballot.	Hiland Hall (NR)	Seated January 21, 1833
Virginia 22nd	Charles C. Johnston (J)	Died June 17, 1832	Joseph Draper (J)	Seated December 6, 1832
Maryland 6th	George E. Mitchell (J)	Died June 28, 1832	Charles S. Sewall (J)	Seated October 1, 1832
Virginia 18th	Philip Doddridge (NR)	Died November 19, 1832	Joseph Johnson (J)	Seated January 21, 1833
New York 1st	James Lent (J)	Died February 22, 1833	Vacant	Not filled this Congress

== Committees ==
Lists of committees and their party leaders.

=== Senate ===
- Accounts of James Monroe (Select)
- Agriculture (Chairman: Horatio Seymour)
- Amending the Constitution on the Election of the President and Vice President (Select)
- Audit and Control the Contingent Expenses of the Senate (Chairman: Nehemiah Knight)
- Claims (Chairman: Benjamin Ruggles)
- Commerce (Chairman: John Forsyth then William R. King)
- Distributing Public Revenue Among the States (Select)
- District of Columbia (Chairman: Ezekiel F. Chambers)
- Dueling (Select)
- Engrossed Bills (Chairman: John M. Robinson then Asher Robbins)
- Finance (Chairman: Samuel Smith then John Forsyth)
- Foreign Relations (Chairman: Littleton Tazewell then John Forsyth)
- French Spoilations (Select)
- Impeachment of James H. Peck (Select)
- Indian Affairs (Chairman: Hugh Lawson White then George M. Troup)
- Judiciary (Chairman: William L. Marcy then William Wilkins)
- Manufactures (Chairman: Mahlon Dickerson)
- Memorial of the Manufacturers Iron (Select)
- Mileage of Members of Congress (Select)
- Military Affairs (Chairman: Thomas Hart Benton)
- Militia (Chairman: Isaac Barnard)
- Naval Affairs (Chairman: Robert Y. Hayne)
- Nomination of Amos Kendall (Select)
- Pensions (Chairman: Samuel A. Foot)
- Post Office Department (Select)
- Post Office and Post Roads (Chairman: George M. Bibb)
- Private Land Claims (Chairman: Elias Kane)
- Public Lands (Chairman: William R. King then Elias Kane)
- Roads and Canals (Select) (Chairman: William Hendricks)
- Tariff Regulation (Select)
- Whole

=== House of Representatives ===
- Accounts (Chairman: N/A)
- Agriculture (Chairman: Erastus Root)
- American Colonization Society (Select)
- Claims (Chairman: N/A)
- Commerce (Chairman: N/A)
- District of Columbia (Chairman: N/A)
- Elections (Chairman: N/A)
- Establishing an Assay Office in the Gold Region (Select)
- Expenditures in the Navy Department (Chairman: N/A)
- Expenditures in the Post Office Department (Chairman: N/A)
- Expenditures in the State Department (Chairman: N/A)
- Expenditures in the Treasury Department (Chairman: N/A)
- Expenditures in the War Department (Chairman: N/A)
- Expenditures on Public Buildings (Chairman: N/A)
- Foreign Affairs (Chairman: William S. Archer)
- Indian Affairs (Chairman: N/A)
- Judiciary (Chairman: Warren R. Davis then John Bell)
- Manufactures (Chairman: Michael Hoffman)
- Military Affairs (Chairman: N/A)
- Naval Affairs (Chairman: N/A)
- Post Office and Post Roads (Chairman: Richard M. Johnson then Henry W. Connor)
- Public Expenditures (Chairman: N/A)
- Public Lands (Chairman: Charles A. Wickliffe)
- Revisal and Unfinished Business (Chairman: N/A)
- Revolutionary Claims (Chairman: N/A)
- Revolutionary Pensions (Chairman: N/A)
- Rules (Select)
- Standards of Official Conduct (Chairman: N/A)
- Territories (Chairman: N/A)
- Ways and Means (Chairman: George McDuffie then Gulian C. Verplanck)
- Whole

=== Joint committees ===
- Enrolled Bills
- The Library

== Employees ==
- Librarian of Congress: John Silva Meehan

=== Senate ===
- Chaplain: Henry V. Johns (Episcopal), until December 19, 1831
  - John P. Durbin (Methodist), elected December 19, 1831
  - Charles C. Pise (Roman Catholic), elected December 11, 1832
- Secretary: Walter Lowrie
- Sergeant at Arms: Mountjoy Bayly

=== House of Representatives ===
- Chaplain: Ralph R. Gurley (Presbyterian), until December 13, 1831
  - Reuben Post (Presbyterian) elected December 13, 1831
  - William Hammett (Presbyterian), elected December 12, 1832
- Clerk: Matthew St. Clair Clarke
- Doorkeeper: Overton Carr, elected December 5, 1831
- Sergeant at Arms: John O. Dunn

== See also ==
- 1830 United States elections (elections leading to this Congress)
  - 1830–31 United States Senate elections
  - 1830–31 United States House of Representatives elections
- 1832 United States elections (elections during this Congress, leading to the next Congress)
  - 1832 United States presidential election
  - 1832–33 United States Senate elections
  - 1832–33 United States House of Representatives elections
