= Alexander Smyth =

United States Army general (1765–1830)

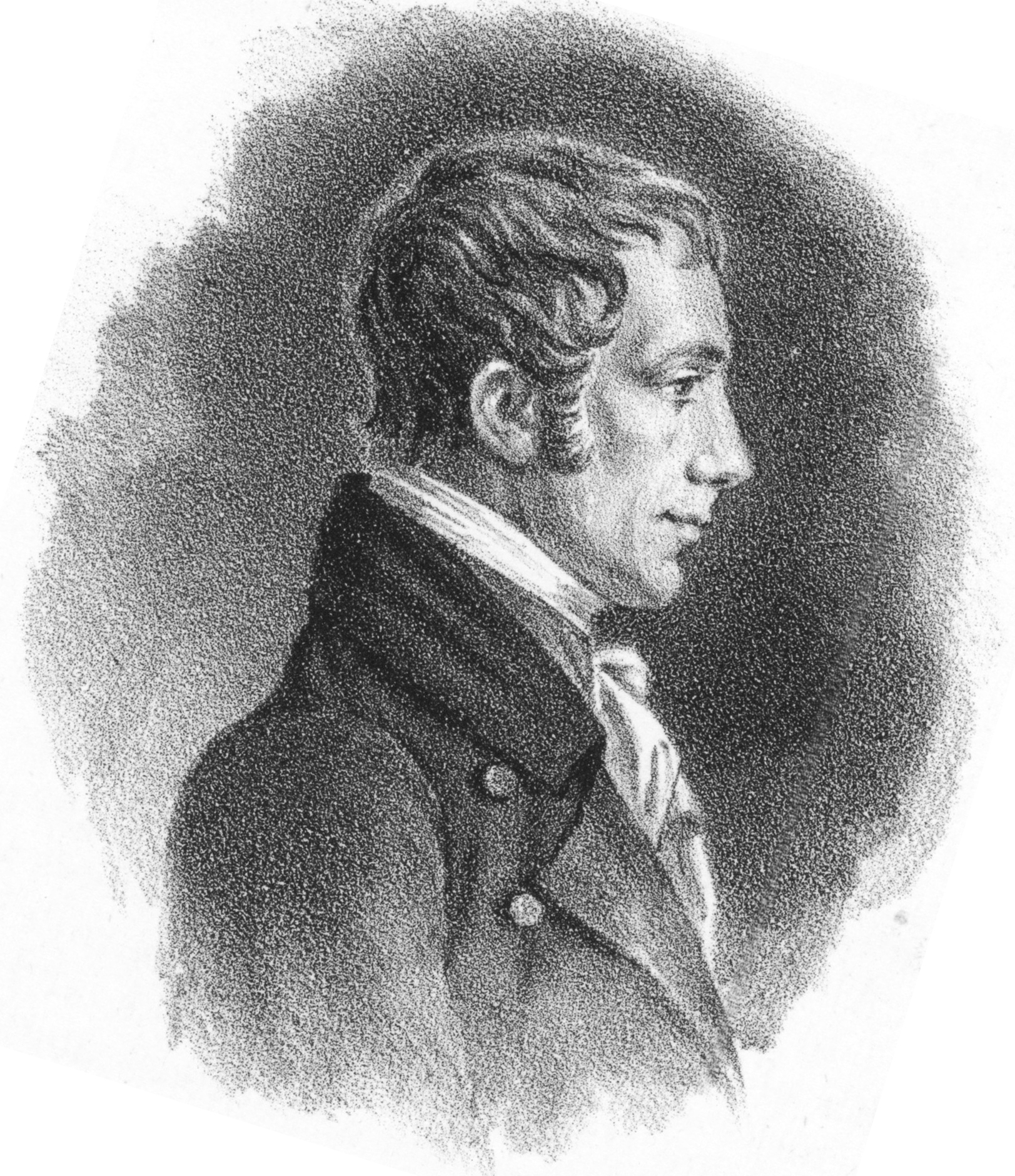
- Portrait of Alexander Smyth

Member of the U.S. House of Representatives from Virginia
- In office March 4, 1817 – March 4, 1825
- Preceded by: Daniel Sheffey (6th); Hugh Nelson (22nd)
- Succeeded by: George Tucker (6th); Benjamin Estil (22nd)
- Constituency: 6th district (1817-23); 22nd district (1823-25)
- In office March 4, 1827 – April 17, 1830
- Preceded by: Benjamin Estil
- Succeeded by: Joseph Draper
- Constituency: 22nd district

Member of the Virginia House of Delegates from Wythe County
- In office 1826; Alongside Montgomery Friel
- In office 1816; Alongside Jacob Fishback
- In office 1804–1807; Alongside Joseph Crockett and Samuel Graham
- In office 1801; Alongside Daniel Sheffey
- In office 1796; Alongside Francis Carter
- In office 1792; Alongside William Caffee

Personal details
- Born: 1765 Rathlin Island, County Antrim, Kingdom of Ireland
- Died: April 17, 1830 (aged 64–65) Washington, D.C., U.S.
- Resting place: Congressional Cemetery, Washington, D.C.
- Party: Jacksonian
- Other political affiliations: Democratic-Republican
- Spouse: Nancy Binkley
- Children: Malvina Smyth
- Occupation: Lawyer, politician

Military service
- Branch/service: United States Army
- Years of service: 1808 – 1813
- Rank: Brigadier General
- Commands: Regiment of Riflemen
- Battles/wars: War of 1812; Battle of Queenston Heights; Battle of Frenchman's Creek

Alexander Smyth (1765 – April 17, 1830) was an American lawyer, soldier, and politician from Virginia. Smyth served in the Virginia Senate, Virginia House of Delegates, United States House of Representatives and as a general during the War of 1812. Smyth County, Virginia, is named in his honor.

== Early life ==
Smyth was born on Rathlin Island in County Antrim (part of the Kingdom of Ireland). He immigrated to the United States with his father, Rev. Alfred Smythe at the age of 10, and settled in Botetourt County, Virginia, in 1775 where he completed preparatory studies. He studied law, and was admitted to the bar and commenced practice in Abingdon, Virginia.

Smyth moved to Wythe County, Virginia, and was a member of the Virginia House of Delegates in 1792, 1796, 1801, 1802, and from 1804 to 1808. He served in the Virginia Senate in 1808 and 1809.

== Military career ==
Smyth served in the United States Army from 1808 to 1813. Commissioned as a colonel in 1808, he served as Inspector General to William Eustis, the acting War Secretary.

Shortly after the outbreak of the War of 1812, Smyth was promoted to brigadier general on July 6, 1812. During the Battle of Queenston Heights he refused to support his commander, General Stephen Van Rensselaer, a militia commander with no experience. After Van Rensselaer's disgrace, Smyth was given command and proved himself equally inept. His plan to invade Canada started with the Battle of Frenchman's Creek but was then abandoned because of problems due to poor organization.

After the failed attack on Canada, Smyth was insulted by Brigadier General Peter B. Porter, who accused Smyth of cowardice. Smyth challenged Porter to a duel, but both men went unscathed. The historian John R. Elting wrote of the duel, stating, "Unfortunately, both missed." In the wake of his failure, Smyth's name was removed from the U.S. Army rolls.

== Postwar career ==
After the war, Smyth resumed the practice of law, and again became a member of the Virginia House of Delegates in 1816, 1817, 1826, and 1827. He was elected to the Fifteenth United States Congress and reelected to the Sixteenth, Seventeenth, and Eighteenth Congresses, serving from March 4, 1817, to March 3, 1825. He was elected again to the Twentieth and Twenty-first Congresses, serving again from March 4, 1827, until his death.

Smyth died in Washington, D.C., and was interred in the United States Congressional Cemetery. Smyth County, Virginia, is named after him.

== Electoral history ==
- 1817; Smyth was elected to the U.S. House of Representatives with 66.99% of the vote, defeating Federalist Benjamin Estill.
- 1819; Smyth was re-elected unopposed.
- 1821; Smyth was re-elected unopposed.

== See also ==
- List of members of the United States Congress who died in office (1790–1899)

U.S. House of Representatives
Preceded by Daniel Sheffey	Member of the U.S. House of Representatives from Virginia's 6th congressional district 1817–1823	Succeeded by George Tucker
Preceded by Hugh Nelson	Member of the U.S. House of Representatives from Virginia's 22nd congressional district 1823–1825	Succeeded by Benjamin Estil
Preceded by Benjamin Estil	Member of the U.S. House of Representatives from Virginia's 22nd congressional district 1827–1830	Succeeded by Joseph Draper
Military offices
Preceded by Abimael Y. Nicoll (acting)	Inspector General of the U. S. Army; July 6, 1812 – March 3, 1813	Succeeded by Zebulon Pike
