= John B. Sterigere =

American politician (1793–1852)

John Benton Sterigere (July 31, 1793 – October 13, 1852) was an American politician from Pennsylvania who served as a Jacksonian Democrat member of the U.S. House of Representatives for Pennsylvania's 5th congressional district from 1827 to 1831.

Sterigere was born in Upper Dublin Township, Pennsylvania, near what is today Ambler, to Peter Sterigere (1760–1806) and Ann Elizabeth Sterigere (née Haupt) (1770–1853). He worked on a farm and attended school. He was appointed justice of the peace in 1818 and was elected a member of the Pennsylvania House of Representatives, serving from 1821 to 1824. He studied law, was admitted to the bar on November 17, 1829, and commenced practice in Norristown, Pennsylvania.

Sterigere was elected to the Twentieth Congress and reelected as a Jacksonian to the Twenty-first Congress. He served as the chairman of the United States House Committee on Private Land Claims during the Twenty-first Congress. He was a delegate to the state convention to revise the constitution in 1838 and a member of the Pennsylvania State Senate for the 3rd district in 1839 and for the 2nd district from 1843 to 1846. At the 1838 PA Constitutional Convention, he proposed an amendment inserting the word "white" into the suffrage law, which passed, thus disenfranchising African Americans in Pennsylvania.

He was a delegate to the 1852 Democratic National Convention. He edited the Register and was appointed by the State assembly as chairman of a commission to improve the town of Norristown. He died in Norristown in 1852.

== Sources ==
- United States Congress. "John B. Sterigere (id: S000867)". Biographical Directory of the United States Congress.
- The Political Graveyard

U.S. House of Representatives
Preceded by Philip Swenk Markley	Member of the U.S. House of Representatives from Pennsylvania's 5th congressional district 1827–1831	Succeeded by Joel K. Mann
