= Samuel A. Smith =

American politician (1795–1861)

Member of the U.S. House of Representatives from Pennsylvania's 8th district
- In office October 13, 1829 – March 3, 1833
- Preceded by: Samuel D. Ingham
- Succeeded by: Henry King

Member of the Pennsylvania Senate for the 4th district
- In office 1841–1842
- Preceded by: Francis James
- Succeeded by: William Williamson

Personal details
- Born: 1795 Harrow, Pennsylvania, U.S.
- Died: May 15, 1861 (aged 65–66) Point Pleasant, Pennsylvania, U.S.
- Party: Jacksonian

Samuel A. Smith (1795 – May 15, 1861) was an American politician from Pennsylvania who served as a Jacksonian member of the U.S. House of Representatives for Pennsylvania's 8th congressional district from 1829 to 1833.

Samuel A. Smith was born in Harrow, Pennsylvania. He was commissioned justice of the peace for the Rockhill-Milford district before he was twenty-one years of age. He served as register of wills for Bucks County, Pennsylvania, from 1824 to 1829. He was the brigade inspector of militia for the Bucks and Montgomery County district. He resigned this position in 1832, and was elected as a Jacksonian to the Twenty-first Congress to fill in part the vacancies caused by the resignations of George Wolf and Samuel D. Ingham. He was reelected to the Twenty-second Congress.

He was a member of the Pennsylvania State Senate for the 4th district from 1841 to 1842. He was appointed associate judge of the courts of Bucks County by Governor Porter in 1844 and served until 1849. He engaged in mercantile pursuits in Doylestown, Pennsylvania, and later in Point Pleasant, Pennsylvania. He died in Point Pleasant in 1861. Interment in the Doylestown Presbyterian Church Cemetery in Doylestown, Pennsylvania.

== Sources ==
- United States Congress. "Samuel A. Smith (id: S000611)". Biographical Directory of the United States Congress.
- The Political Graveyard

U.S. House of Representatives
Preceded by Samuel D. Ingham; George Wolf	Member of the U.S. House of Representatives from Pennsylvania's 8th congressional district 1829 - 1833; 1829-1831 alongside: Peter Ihrie, Jr. 1831-1833 alongside: Henry King	Succeeded by Henry King
Pennsylvania State Senate
Preceded by Francis James	Member of the Pennsylvania Senate, 4th district 1841-1842	Succeeded by William Williamson
