= Benjamin Estil =

American politician

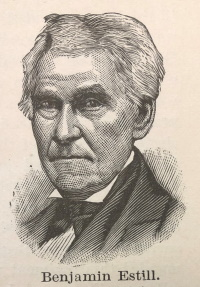
- Illustration portrait of Benjamin Estil

Member of the U.S. House of Representatives from Virginia's 22nd district
- In office March 4, 1825 – March 3, 1827
- Preceded by: Alexander Smyth
- Succeeded by: Alexander Smyth

Member of the Virginia House of Delegates from the 44th district
- In office April 1814 – April 1817

Personal details
- Born: July 14, 1780 Hansonville, Virginia
- Died: July 14, 1853 (aged 73) Oldham County, Kentucky, U.S.
- Party: Federalist Party/Adams
- Spouse: Patsy Hickman Sproule
- Education: Washington and Lee University

Benjamin Estil (March 13, 1780 – July 14, 1853) was a U.S. Representative from Virginia.

== Biography ==
Born in Hansonville (now in Russell County), Virginia, Estil received an academic education, and attended Washington Academy (now Washington and Lee University), Lexington, Virginia. He studied law. He was admitted to the bar and commenced practice in Abingdon, Virginia. He served as a commonwealth's attorney for Washington County. He served as member of the Virginia House of Delegates during the years 1814–1817, in what would become the 44th district.

Estil married Patsy Hickman Sproule on January 20, 1825. Estil was elected as an Adams candidate to the Nineteenth Congress, and served from March 4, 1825 to March 3, 1827.. He served as judge of the fifteenth judicial circuit from 1831 until 1852, when he resigned. He retired to a farm in Oldham County, Kentucky, where he died July 14, 1853.

== Sources ==
- United States Congress. "Benjamin Estil (id: E000223)". Biographical Directory of the United States Congress.

U.S. House of Representatives
Preceded by Alexander Smyth	Member of the U.S. House of Representatives from Virginia's 21st congressional district 1825–1827	Succeeded by Alexander Smyth
