= Virginia's 22nd congressional district =

1803–1833 US congressional district

Coordinates: 37°0′N 81°40′W

- Obsolete district
- Created: 1800
- Eliminated: 1830
- Years active: 1803–1833

Virginia's 22nd congressional district is an obsolete congressional district. It was eliminated in 1833 after the 1830 U.S. census. Its last congressman was Joseph Draper.

== List of members representing the district ==
Representative	Party	Term	Cong ress	Electoral history
District established March 4, 1803
John Clopton (Tunstall)	Democratic-Republican	March 4, 1803 – March 3, 1813	8th 9th 10th 11th 12th	Redistricted from the 10th district and re-elected in 1803. Re-elected in 1805. Re-elected in 1807. Re-elected in 1809. Re-elected in 1811. Redistricted to the 23rd district.
Hugh Nelson (Milton)	Democratic-Republican	March 4, 1813 – January 14, 1823	13th 14th 15th 16th 17th	Elected in 1813. Re-elected in 1815. Re-elected in 1817. Re-elected in 1819. Re-elected in 1821. Resigned to become U.S. Minister to Spain.
Vacant		January 15, 1823 – March 3, 1823	18th	
Alexander Smyth (Wythe County)	Crawford; Democratic-Republican	March 4, 1823 – March 3, 1825	18th	Redistricted from the 6th district and re-elected in 1823. Lost re-election.
Benjamin Estil (Abingdon)	Anti-Jacksonian	March 4, 1825 – March 3, 1827	19th	Elected in 1825. Lost re-election.
Alexander Smyth (Wythe County)	Jacksonian	March 4, 1827 – April 17, 1830	20th 21st	Elected in 1827. Re-elected in 1829. Died.
Vacant		April 17, 1830 – December 5, 1830	21st	
Joseph Draper (Wythe County)	Jacksonian	December 6, 1830 – March 3, 1831	21st	Elected to finish Smyth's term. Lost re-election.
Charles C. Johnston (Abingdon)	Jacksonian	March 4, 1831 – June 17, 1832	22nd	Elected in 1831. Died.
Vacant		June 18, 1832 – December 5, 1832	22nd	
Joseph Draper (Wythe County)	Jacksonian	December 6, 1832 – March 3, 1833	22nd	Elected to finish Johnston's term. Retired.
District dissolved March 4, 1833
