= Peter Ihrie Jr. =

American politician (1796–1871)

Member of the U.S. House of Representatives from Pennsylvania's 8th district
- In office October 13, 1829 – March 3, 1833
- Preceded by: See below
- Succeeded by: See below

Member of the Pennsylvania House of Representatives
- In office 1826-1827

Personal details
- Born: February 3, 1796 Easton, Pennsylvania, U.S.
- Died: March 29, 1871 (aged 75) Easton, Pennsylvania, U.S.
- Party: Jacksonian
- Education: Dickinson College

Peter Ihrie Jr. (February 3, 1796 – March 29, 1871) was a Jacksonian member of the U.S. House of Representatives from Pennsylvania.

== Biography ==
Peter Ihrie Jr. was born in Easton, Pennsylvania. He graduated from Dickinson College in Carlisle, Pennsylvania, in 1815. He studied law, was admitted to the bar in 1818 and commenced practice in Easton. He was a charter member of the board of trustees of Lafayette College in 1826. He served as a member of the Pennsylvania House of Representatives in 1826 and 1827. He served as brigadier general of State militia in 1845.

Ihrie was elected as a Jacksonian candidate to the Twenty-first Congress to fill in part the vacancies caused by the resignations of George Wolf and Samuel D. Ingham. He was reelected as a Jacksonian to the Twenty-second Congress. He was a member of the board of directors of the Easton Bank and died in Easton, Pennyslania. Interment in Easton Cemetery.

== Sources ==
- United States Congress. "Peter Ihrie Jr. (id: I000006)". Biographical Directory of the United States Congress.
- The Political Graveyard

U.S. House of Representatives
Preceded by George Wolf; Samuel D. Ingham	Member of the U.S. House of Representatives from Pennsylvania's 8th congressional district 1829–1833 alongside: Samuel A. Smith	Succeeded by Henry King; Samuel A. Smith
