= Henry King (Pennsylvania politician) =

American politician

Member of the U.S. House of Representatives from Pennsylvania
- In office March 4, 1831 – March 3, 1835
- Preceded by: Joseph Fry, Jr. (7th); Multi-member district (8th)
- Succeeded by: David D. Wagener (7th); Edward B. Hubley (8th)
- Constituency: 7th district (1831-33); 8th district (1833–35)

Member of the Pennsylvania Senate for the 12th district
- In office 1825-1830

Personal details
- Born: July 6, 1790 Palmer, Massachusetts, US
- Died: July 13, 1861 (aged 71) Allentown, Pennsylvania, US
- Party: Jacksonian

Henry King (July 6, 1790 – July 13, 1861) was an American politician who served as a Jacksonian member of the U.S. House of Representatives for Pennsylvania's 7th congressional district from 1831 to 1833 and Pennsylvania's 8th congressional district from 1833 to 1835.

== Biography ==
King was born in Palmer, Massachusetts. He studied law in New London, Connecticut, and Wilkes-Barre, Pennsylvania. He was admitted to the bar in 1815 and commenced practice in Allentown, Pennsylvania. He was a member of the Pennsylvania State Senate for the 12th district from 1825 to 1830.

King was elected as a Jacksonian to the Twenty-second and Twenty-third Congresses. He was not a candidate for renomination in 1834 to the Twenty-Fourth Congress. He resumed the practice of law after leaving congress. He died in Allentown in 1861 and is interred at the Union-West End Cemetery.

He was the brother of Georgia Congressman Thomas Butler King and uncle of Louisiana Congressman John Floyd King.

== Sources ==
- United States Congress. "Henry King (id: K000202)". Biographical Directory of the United States Congress.
- The Political Graveyard

Pennsylvania State Senate
Preceded by Henry Winter	Member of the Pennsylvania Senate, 12th district 1825-1830	Succeeded by William G. Scott
U.S. House of Representatives
Preceded by Joseph Fry, Jr.	Member of the U.S. House of Representatives from Pennsylvania's 7th congressional district 1831–1833	Succeeded by District inactive
Preceded by Samuel A. Smith; Peter Ihrie, Jr.	Member of the U.S. House of Representatives from Pennsylvania's 8th congressional district 1833–1835	Succeeded by Edward Burd Hubley
