= Joel Keith Mann =

American politician (1780–1857)

Joel Keith Mann (August 1, 1780 – August 28, 1857) was an American politician from Pennsylvania who served as a Jacksonian member of the U.S. House of Representatives from 1831 to 1835.

== Early life ==
Mann was born in Cheltenham Township, Pennsylvania to Samuel M. and Margaret Keith Mann. He was educated in the common schools and worked as a farmer.

== Career ==
He was a member of the Pennsylvania House of Representatives from 1817 to 1820. He served in the Pennsylvania State Senate for the 3rd district from 1824 to 1829.

Mann was elected as a Jacksonian to the Twenty-second and Twenty-third Congresses. He served as chairman of the United States House Committee on Accounts during the Twenty-third Congress. He resumed agricultural pursuits and died in Jenkintown, Pennsylvania.

== Sources ==
- United States Congress. "Joel Keith Mann (id: M000107)". Biographical Directory of the United States Congress.
- The Political Graveyard

U.S. House of Representatives
Preceded by John Benton Sterigere	Member of the U.S. House of Representatives from Pennsylvania's 5th congressional district 1831–1835	Succeeded by Jacob Fry, Jr.
