= William Fitzgerald (Tennessee politician) =

American politician

Member of the U.S. House of Representatives from Tennessee's 9th district
- In office March 4, 1831 – March 3, 1833
- Preceded by: Davy Crockett
- Succeeded by: James K. Polk

Member of the Tennessee House of Representatives
- In office 1825-1826

Personal details
- Born: August 6, 1799 Port Tobacco, Maryland, U.S.
- Died: March 1864 (aged 64) Paris, Tennessee, U.S.
- Resting place: Fitzgerald Cemetery near Paris, Tennessee, U.S.
- Party: Jacksonian
- Spouse: Elizabeth Wells (m. 1822)
- Profession: Lawyer; politician

William Fitzgerald (August 6, 1799 – March 1864) was an American politician who represented Tennessee's 9th congressional district in the United States House of Representatives. He was also a slave owner.

== Biography ==
Fitzgerald was born at Port Tobacco in Charles County, Maryland, on August 6, 1799. In 1806, he moved with his father to Dover, Tennessee. He was educated in England and studied law. He was admitted to the bar at Dover, Tennessee in 1821. In 1822, he married Elizabeth Wells, who was born near Clarksville, Tennessee.

== Career ==
Between 1822 and 1825 Fitzgerald was the circuit court clerk for Stewart County. He was a member of Tennessee house of representatives from 1825 to 1826. He was elected solicitor general of the sixteenth solicitorial district of Tennessee on November 25, 1826, which he held until he vacated the role on March 4, 1831.

Fitzgerald was elected as a Jacksonian to the Twenty-second Congress, which lasted from March 4, 1831 to March 3, 1833. He was an unsuccessful candidate for re-election to the Twenty-third Congress in 1832. He moved to Paris, Tennessee and served as judge of the ninth judicial circuit of Tennessee from 1845 to 1861. In 1861, he was nominated as a representative from Tennessee's ninth congressional district to attend a peace conference in 1861 in an effort to prevent the pending Civil War; Isaac Roberts Hawkins was elected to that role.

== Death ==
Fitzgerald died at Paris, Tennessee, in March 1864 (age about 64 years). He was interred in Fitzgerald Cemetery near Paris, Tennessee.

U.S. House of Representatives
Preceded by Davy Crockett	Member of the U.S. House of Representatives from Tennessee's 9th congressional district 1831–1833	Succeeded by James K. Polk
