= Charles Clement Johnston =

American politician (1795–1832)

Member of the U.S. House of Representatives from Virginia's 22nd district
- In office March 4, 1831 – June 17, 1832
- Preceded by: Joseph Draper
- Succeeded by: Joseph Draper

Personal details
- Born: April 30, 1795 Prince Edward County, Virginia, U.S.
- Died: June 17, 1832 (aged 37) Alexandria, Virginia, U.S.
- Resting place: Congressional Cemetery

Charles Clement Johnston (April 30, 1795 – June 17, 1832) was a U.S. representative from Virginia.

== Biography ==
Born in Prince Edward County, Virginia, and educated at home, he moved with his parents to his grandfather's house, Panicello, near Abingdon, Virginia, in 1811. He studied law and was admitted to the bar in 1818 and commenced practice in Abingdon, Virginia. He was elected as a Jacksonian Democrat to the 22nd Congress and served from March 4, 1831, until his death.

His brother Joseph E. Johnston, was a Confederate general and also, much later, a U.S. Representative. The Johnston political family of Virginia also includes a nephew, John W. Johnston, who was a United States Senator, and grandnephew Henry Bowen, also a U.S. Representative for Virginia.

He died from drowning near Alexandria on June 17, 1832, aged 37. He was buried in the Congressional Cemetery in Washington, D.C.

== See also ==
- List of members of the United States Congress who died in office (1790–1899)

U.S. House of Representatives
Preceded by Joseph Draper	Member of the U.S. House of Representatives from Virginia's 22nd congressional district March 4, 1831 – June 17, 1832	Succeeded by Joseph Draper
