= Joseph Draper =

American politician

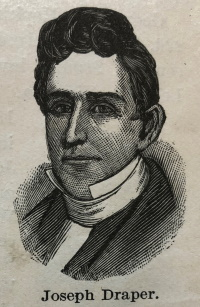

Member of the Senate of Virginia
- In office 1828–1830

U.S. Representative from Virginia
- In office December 6, 1830 – March 3, 1831

U.S. Representative from Virginia
- In office December 6, 1832 – March 3, 1833

Joseph Draper (December 25, 1794 – June 10, 1834) was a U.S. representative from Virginia.

== Early life and education ==
Born in Draper Valley, Wythe (now Pulaski) County, Virginia, Draper attended private schools. He studied law. He was admitted to the bar in 1818 and commenced practice in Wytheville, Virginia. He served as a private in the War of 1812. He served as member of the Senate of Virginia during the period 1828–1830.

== Tenure in Congress ==
Draper was elected as a Jacksonian to the Twenty-first Congress to fill the vacancy caused by the death of Alexander Smyth and served from December 6, 1830, to March 3, 1831. He unsuccessfully contested the election of Charles C. Johnston to the Twenty-second Congress.

Draper was subsequently elected to the Twenty-second Congress to fill the vacancy caused by the death of Charles C. Johnston and served from December 6, 1832, to March 3, 1833. He was not a candidate for renomination.

== Later life and death ==
He resumed the practice of law until his death in Wytheville, Virginia, June 10, 1834. He was interred in a private cemetery known as Oglesbies Cemetery, Drapers Valley, Virginia.

== Sources ==
- United States Congress. "Joseph Draper (id: D000487)". Biographical Directory of the United States Congress.

U.S. House of Representatives
Preceded by Alexander Smyth	Member of the U.S. House of Representatives from Virginia's 22nd congressional district December 6, 1830 - March 3, 1831	Succeeded by Charles C. Johnston
Preceded by Charles C. Johnston	Member of the U.S. House of Representatives from Virginia's 22nd congressional district December 6, 1832 - March 3, 1833	Succeeded by District eliminated
