= List of United States representatives in the 22nd Congress =

This is a complete list of United States representatives during the 22nd United States Congress listed by seniority.

As an historical article, the districts and party affiliations listed reflect those during the 22nd Congress (March 4, 1831 – March 3, 1833). Seats and party affiliations on similar lists for other congresses will be different for certain members.

Seniority depends on the date on which members were sworn into office. Since many members are sworn in on the same day, subsequent ranking is based on previous congressional service of the individual and then by alphabetical order by the last name of the representative.

Committee chairmanship in the House is often associated with seniority. However, party leadership is typically not associated with seniority.

Note: The "*" indicates that the representative/delegate may have served one or more non-consecutive terms while in the House of Representatives of the United States Congress.

== U.S. House seniority list ==
U.S. House seniority
Rank	Representative	Party	District	Seniority date (Previous service, if any)	No.# of term(s)	Notes
1	William McCoy	J	VA-19	March 4, 1811	11th term	Dean of the House; Left the House in 1833.
2	John W. Taylor	AJ	NY-17	March 4, 1813	10th term	Left the House in 1833.
3	Lewis Williams	AJ	NC-13	March 4, 1815	9th term	
4	Charles F. Mercer	AJ	VA-14	March 4, 1817	8th term	
5	Mark Alexander	J	VA-04	March 4, 1819	7th term	Left the House in 1833.
6	William S. Archer	AJ	VA-03	January 3, 1820	7th term	
7	Rollin Carolas Mallary	AJ	VT-02	January 13, 1820	7th term	Died on April 15, 1831.
8	Noyes Barber	AJ	CT	March 4, 1821	6th term	
9	Henry William Connor	J	NC-11	March 4, 1821	6th term	
10	Jacob C. Isacks	J	TN-04	March 4, 1821	6th term	Left the House in 1833.
11	George McDuffie	N	SC-05	March 4, 1821	6th term	
12	Joseph Vance	AJ	OH-04	March 4, 1821	6th term	
13	John Reed, Jr.	AM	MA-13	March 4, 1821; Previous service, 1813–1817.	8th term*	
14	Andrew Stevenson	J	VA-09	March 4, 1821	6th term	Speaker of the House of Representatives
15	Wiley Thompson	J	GA	March 4, 1821	6th term	Left the House in 1833.
16	Lewis Condict	AJ	NJ	October 9, 1821; Previous service, 1811–1817.	9th term*	Left the House in 1833.
17	Churchill C. Cambreleng	J	NY-03	December 3, 1821	6th term	
18	John S. Barbour	J	VA-15	March 4, 1823	5th term	Left the House in 1833.
19	John Blair	J	TN-01	March 4, 1823	5th term	
20	Robert P. Letcher	AJ	KY-04	March 4, 1823	5th term	Left the House in 1833.
21	Samuel Finley Vinton	AJ	OH-07	March 4, 1823	5th term	
22	Elisha Whittlesey	AJ	OH-13	March 4, 1823	5th term	
23	Charles A. Wickliffe	J	KY-09	March 4, 1823	5th term	Left the House in 1833.
24	John Anderson	J	ME-02	March 4, 1825	4th term	Left the House in 1833.
25	William Armstrong	J	VA-16	March 4, 1825	4th term	Left the House in 1833.
26	Tristam Burges	AJ	RI	March 4, 1825	4th term	
28	Samuel Price Carson	J	NC-12	March 4, 1825	4th term	Left the House in 1833.
29	Nathaniel Claiborne	J	VA-07	March 4, 1825	4th term	
30	Thomas Davenport	AJ	VA-06	March 4, 1825	4th term	
31	John Davis	AJ	MA-05	March 4, 1825	4th term	
32	Edward Everett	AJ	MA-04	March 4, 1825	4th term	
33	James Findlay	J	OH-01	March 4, 1825	4th term	Left the House in 1833.
34	Michael Hoffman	J	NY-15	March 4, 1825	4th term	Left the House in 1833.
35	Ralph Isaacs Ingersoll	AJ	CT	March 4, 1825	4th term	Left the House in 1833.
36	Joseph Lecompte	J	KY-06	March 4, 1825	4th term	Left the House in 1833.
37	Dutee Jerauld Pearce	AJ	RI	March 4, 1825	4th term	
38	James K. Polk	J	TN-06	March 4, 1825	4th term	
39	Gulian C. Verplanck	J	NY-03	March 4, 1825	4th term	Left the House in 1833.
40	William Drayton	J	SC-01	May 17, 1825	4th term	Left the House in 1833.
41	Daniel Laurens Barringer	J	NC-08	December 4, 1826	4th term	
42	Robert Allen	J	VA-17	March 4, 1827	3rd term	Left the House in 1833.
43	Isaac C. Bates	AJ	MA-08	March 4, 1827	3rd term	
44	John Bell	AJ	TN-07	March 4, 1827	3rd term	
45	Richard Coulter	J	PA-17	March 4, 1827	3rd term	
46	Henry Daniel	J	KY-01	March 4, 1827	3rd term	Left the House in 1833.
47	Warren R. Davis	N	SC-06	March 4, 1827	3rd term	
48	Joseph Duncan	J	IL	March 4, 1827	3rd term	
49	Thomas H. Hall	J	NC-03	March 4, 1827; Previous service, 1817–1825.	7th term*	
50	James L. Hodges	AJ	MA-12	March 4, 1827	3rd term	Left the House in 1833.
51	Jonathan Hunt	J	VT-01	March 4, 1827	3rd term	Died on May 15, 1832.
52	Adam King	J	PA-10	March 4, 1827	3rd term	Left the House in 1833.
53	Wilson Lumpkin	J	GA	March 4, 1827; Previous service, 1815–1817.	4th term*	Resigned sometime in 1831.
54	Chittenden Lyon	J	KY-12	March 4, 1827	3rd term	
55	Lewis Maxwell	AJ	VA-21	March 4, 1827	3rd term	Left the House in 1833.
56	William T. Nuckolls	J	SC-07	March 4, 1827	3rd term	Left the House in 1833.
57	William Ramsey	J	PA-11	March 4, 1827	3rd term	Died on September 29, 1831.
58	William Russell	J	OH-05	March 4, 1827	3rd term	Left the House in 1833.
59	Augustine Henry Shepperd	J	NC-09	March 4, 1827	3rd term	
60	Joel Barlow Sutherland	J	PA-01	March 4, 1827	3rd term	Left the House in 1833.
61	George Corbin Washington	AJ	MD-03	March 4, 1827	3rd term	Left the House in 1833.
62	Rufus McIntire	J	ME-01	September 10, 1827	3rd term	
63	William Stanbery	AJ	OH-08	October 9, 1827	3rd term	Left the House in 1833.
64	Phineas L. Tracy	AM	NY-29	November 5, 1827	3rd term	Left the House in 1833.
65	Richard Henry Wilde	J	GA	November 17, 1827; Previous service, 1815–1817 and 1825.	5th term**	
66	James F. Randolph	AJ	NJ	December 1, 1828	3rd term	Left the House in 1833.
67	William G. Angel	J	NY-13	March 4, 1829; Previous service, 1825–1827.	3rd term*	Left the House in 1833.
68	Robert Woodward Barnwell	J	SC-02	March 4, 1829	2nd term	Left the House in 1833.
69	James Blair	J	SC-08	March 4, 1829; Previous service, 1821–1822.	3rd term*	
70	Ratliff Boon	J	IN-01	March 4, 1829; Previous service, 1825–1827.	3rd term*	
71	Thomas Bouldin	J	VA-05	March 4, 1829	2nd term	Left the House in 1833.
72	John Brodhead	J	NH	March 4, 1829	2nd term	Left the House in 1833.
73	William Cahoon	AM	VT-05	March 4, 1829	2nd term	Left the House in 1833.
74	Clement Comer Clay	J	AL-01	March 4, 1829	2nd term	
75	Thomas Chandler	J	NH	March 4, 1829	2nd term	Left the House in 1833.
76	Richard Coke, Jr.	J	VA-08	March 4, 1829	2nd term	Left the House in 1833.
77	Richard M. Cooper	AJ	NJ	March 4, 1829	2nd term	Left the House in 1833.
78	Robert Craig	J	VA-20	March 4, 1829	2nd term	Left the House in 1833.
79	Joseph Halsey Crane	AJ	OH-03	March 4, 1829	2nd term	
80	Thomas Hartley Crawford	J	PA-11	March 4, 1829	2nd term	Left the House in 1833.
81	William Creighton, Jr.	AJ	OH-06	March 4, 1829; Previous service, 1813–1817 and 1827–1828.	5th term**	Left the House in 1833.
82	Philip Doddridge	AJ	VA-18	March 4, 1829	2nd term	Died on November 19, 1832.
83	William W. Ellsworth	AJ	CT	March 4, 1829	2nd term	
84	Joshua Evans, Jr.	J	PA-04	March 4, 1829	2nd term	Left the House in 1833.
85	Horace Everett	AJ	VT-03	March 4, 1829	2nd term	
86	William Fitzgerald	J	TN-09	March 4, 1829	2nd term	Left the House in 1833.
87	James Ford	J	PA-09	March 4, 1829	2nd term	Left the House in 1833.
88	Thomas Flournoy Foster	J	GA	March 4, 1829	2nd term	
89	Nathan Gaither	J	KY-08	March 4, 1829	2nd term	Left the House in 1833.
90	John Gilmore	J	PA-16	March 4, 1829	2nd term	Left the House in 1833.
91	George Grennell, Jr.	AJ	MA-07	March 4, 1829	2nd term	
92	Joseph Hammons	J	NH	March 4, 1829	2nd term	Left the House in 1833.
93	Benjamin Chew Howard	J	MD-05	March 4, 1829	2nd term	Left the House in 1833.
94	Henry Hubbard	J	NH	March 4, 1829	2nd term	
95	Thomas H. Hughes	AJ	NJ	March 4, 1829	2nd term	Left the House in 1833.
96	Jabez W. Huntington	AJ	CT	March 4, 1829	2nd term	
97	William W. Irvin	J	OH-09	March 4, 1829	2nd term	Left the House in 1833.
98	Leonard Jarvis	J	ME-06	March 4, 1829	2nd term	
99	Cave Johnson	J	TN-08	March 4, 1829	2nd term	
100	Richard Mentor Johnson	J	KY-05	March 4, 1829; Previous service, 1807–1819.	8th term*	
101	Joseph G. Kendall	AJ	MA-06	March 4, 1829	2nd term	Left the House in 1833.
102	William Kennon, Sr.	J	OH-10	March 4, 1829	2nd term	Left the House in 1833.
103	James Lent	J	NY-01	March 4, 1829	2nd term	Died on February 22, 1833.
104	Dixon H. Lewis	J	AL-03	March 4, 1829	2nd term	
105	Henry A. P. Muhlenberg	J	PA-07	March 4, 1829	2nd term	
106	Spencer Darwin Pettis	J	MO	March 4, 1829	2nd term	Died on August 28, 1831.
107	Robert Potter	J	NC-06	March 4, 1829	2nd term	Resigned in November 1831.
108	Abraham Rencher	J	NC-10	March 4, 1829	2nd term	
109	Benedict Joseph Semmes	AJ	MD-02	March 4, 1829	2nd term	Left the House in 1833.
110	William Biddle Shepard	AJ	NC-01	March 4, 1829	2nd term	
111	Jesse Speight	J	NC-04	March 4, 1829	2nd term	
112	James Israel Standifer	J	TN-03	March 4, 1829; Previous service, 1823–1825.	3rd term*	
113	Philander Stephens	J	PA-09	March 4, 1829	2nd term	Left the House in 1833.
114	William L. Storrs	AJ	CT	March 4, 1829	2nd term	Left the House in 1833.
115	John Thomson	J	OH-12	March 4, 1829; Previous service, 1825–1827.	3rd term*	
116	James Moore Wayne	J	GA	March 4, 1829	2nd term	
117	John W. Weeks	J	NH	March 4, 1829	2nd term	Left the House in 1833.
118	Campbell P. White	J	NY-03	March 4, 1829	2nd term	
119	Edward Douglass White, Sr.	AJ	LA-01	March 4, 1829	2nd term	
120	Ebenezer Young	AJ	CT	March 4, 1829	2nd term	
121	George Evans	AJ	ME-04	July 20, 1829	2nd term	
122	Peter Ihrie, Jr.	J	PA-08	October 13, 1829	2nd term	Left the House in 1833.
123	Samuel A. Smith	J	PA-08	October 13, 1829	2nd term	Left the House in 1833.
124	Henry Graybill Lamar	J	GA	December 7, 1829	2nd term	Left the House in 1833.
125	George Edward Mitchell	J	MD-06	December 7, 1829; Previous service, 1823–1827.	4th term*	Died on June 28, 1832.
126	Harmar Denny	AM	PA-16	December 15, 1829	2nd term	
127	William F. Gordon	J	VA-10	January 25, 1830	2nd term	
128	John M. Patton	D	VA-11	November 25, 1830	2nd term	
129	Cornelius Holland	J	ME-05	December 6, 1830	2nd term	Left the House in 1833.
130	Humphrey H. Leavitt	J	OH-11	December 6, 1830	2nd term	
131	John Adair	J	KY-07	March 4, 1831	1st term	Left the House in 1833.
132	John Quincy Adams	AM	MA-11	March 4, 1831	1st term	
133	Chilton Allan	AJ	KY-03	March 4, 1831	1st term	
134	Heman Allen	AJ	VT-04	March 4, 1831	1st term	
135	Robert Allison	AM	PA-12	March 4, 1831	1st term	Left the House in 1833.
136	Nathan Appleton	AJ	MA-01	March 4, 1831	1st term	Left the House in 1833.
137	Thomas Dickens Arnold	AJ	TN-02	March 4, 1831	1st term	Left the House in 1833.
138	William Babcock	AM	NY-26	March 4, 1831	1st term	Left the House in 1833.
139	John Banks	AM	PA-18	March 4, 1831	1st term	
140	Gamaliel H. Barstow	AM	NY-25	March 4, 1831	1st term	Left the House in 1833.
141	James Bates	J	ME-07	March 4, 1831	1st term	Left the House in 1833.
142	Samuel Beardsley	J	NY-14	March 4, 1831	1st term	
143	John T. Bergen	J	NY-02	March 4, 1831	1st term	Left the House in 1833.
144	Lauchlin Bethune	J	NC-07	March 4, 1831	1st term	Left the House in 1833.
145	Joseph Bouck	J	NY-12	March 4, 1831	1st term	Left the House in 1833.
146	George N. Briggs	AJ	MA-09	March 4, 1831	1st term	
147	John C. Brodhead	J	NY-07	March 4, 1831	1st term	Left the House in 1833.
148	John Conrad Bucher	J	PA-06	March 4, 1831	1st term	Left the House in 1833.
149	Henry Adams Bullard	AJ	LA-03	March 4, 1831	1st term	
150	George Burd	AJ	PA-13	March 4, 1831	1st term	
151	John Carr	J	IN-02	March 4, 1831	1st term	
152	Joseph Chinn	J	VA-13	March 4, 1831	1st term	
153	Rufus Choate	AJ	MA-02	March 4, 1831	1st term	
154	John A. Collier	AM	NY-21	March 4, 1831	1st term	Left the House in 1833.
155	Silas Condit	AJ	NJ	March 4, 1831	1st term	Left the House in 1833.
156	Bates Cooke	AM	NY-30	March 4, 1831	1st term	Left the House in 1833.
157	Eleutheros Cooke	AJ	OH-14	March 4, 1831	1st term	Left the House in 1833.
158	Thomas Corwin	AJ	OH-02	March 4, 1831	1st term	
159	Charles Dayan	J	NY-20	March 4, 1831	1st term	Left the House in 1833.
160	Henry Alexander Scammell Dearborn	AJ	MA-10	March 4, 1831	1st term	Left the House in 1833.
161	Lewis Dewart	J	PA-09	March 4, 1831	1st term	Left the House in 1833.
162	John Dickson	AM	NY-26	March 4, 1831	1st term	
163	Ulysses F. Doubleday	J	NY-24	March 4, 1831	1st term	Left the House in 1833.
164	John Myers Felder	N	SC-04	March 4, 1831	1st term	
165	John K. Griffin	N	SC-09	March 4, 1831	1st term	
166	William Hall	J	TN-05	March 4, 1831	1st term	Left the House in 1833.
167	Joseph M. Harper	J	NH	March 4, 1831	1st term	
168	Albert Gallatin Hawes	J	KY-11	March 4, 1831	1st term	
169	William Hiester	AM	PA-04	March 4, 1831	1st term	
170	William Hogan	J	NY-19	March 4, 1831	1st term	Left the House in 1833.
171	Henry Horn	J	PA-02	March 4, 1831	1st term	Left the House in 1833.
172	Daniel Jenifer	AJ	MD-01	March 4, 1831	1st term	Left the House in 1833.
173	Freeborn G. Jewett	J	NY-23	March 4, 1831	1st term	Left the House in 1833.
174	Charles Clement Johnston	J	VA-22	March 4, 1831	1st term	Died on June 17, 1832.
175	Edward Kavanagh	J	ME-03	March 4, 1831	1st term	
176	John Leeds Kerr	AJ	MD-07	March 4, 1831; Previous service, 1825–1829.	3rd term*	Left the House in 1833.
177	Henry King	J	PA-07	March 4, 1831	1st term	
178	John King	J	NY-08	March 4, 1831	1st term	Left the House in 1833.
179	Gerrit Y. Lansing	J	NY-10	March 4, 1831	1st term	
180	Joel Keith Mann	J	PA-05	March 4, 1831	1st term	
181	Samuel Wright Mardis	J	AL-02	March 4, 1831	1st term	
182	Thomas Alexander Marshall	AJ	KY-02	March 4, 1831	1st term	
183	John Y. Mason	J	VA-02	March 4, 1831	1st term	
184	Johnathan McCarty	J	IN-03	March 4, 1831	1st term	
185	James Iver McKay	J	NC-05	March 4, 1831	1st term	
186	Thomas McKean Thompson McKennan	AM	PA-15	March 4, 1831	1st term	
187	John J. Milligan	AJ	DE	March 4, 1831	1st term	
188	Thomas R. Mitchell	J	SC-03	March 4, 1831; Previous service, 1821–1823 and 1825–1829.	4th term**	Left the House in 1833.
189	Jeremiah Nelson	AJ	MA-03	March 4, 1831; Previous service, 1805–1807 and 1815–1825.	6th term**	Left the House in 1833.
190	Daniel Newnan	J	GA	March 4, 1831	1st term	Left the House in 1833.
191	Thomas Newton, Jr.	AJ	VA-01	March 4, 1831; Previous service, 1801–1830.	16th term*	Left the House in 1833.
192	Edmund H. Pendleton	AJ	NY-05	March 4, 1831	1st term	Left the House in 1833.
193	Job Pierson	J	NY-09	March 4, 1831	1st term	
194	Nathaniel Pitcher	J	NY-18	March 4, 1831; Previous service, 1819–1823.	3rd term*	Left the House in 1833.
195	Franklin E. Plummer	J	MS	March 4, 1831	1st term	
196	David Potts, Jr.	AM	PA-04	March 4, 1831	1st term	
197	Edward C. Reed	J	NY-22	March 4, 1831	1st term	Left the House in 1833.
198	John J. Roane	J	VA-12	March 4, 1831	1st term	Left the House in 1833.
199	Erastus Root	J	NY-11	March 4, 1831; Previous service, 1803–1805, 1809–1811 and 1815–1817.	4th term***	Left the House in 1833.
200	Nathan Soule	J	NY-16	March 4, 1831	1st term	Left the House in 1833.
201	Isaac Southard	AJ	NJ	March 4, 1831	1st term	Left the House in 1833.
202	John S. Spence	AJ	MD-08	March 4, 1831; Previous service, 1823–1825.	2nd term*	Left the House in 1833.
203	Andrew Stewart	AM	PA-14	March 4, 1831; Previous service, 1821–1829.	5th term*	
204	Francis Thomas	J	MD-04	March 4, 1831	1st term	
205	Philemon Thomas	J	LA-02	March 4, 1831	1st term	
206	Christopher Tompkins	AJ	KY-10	March 4, 1831	1st term	
207	Aaron Ward	J	NY-04	March 4, 1831; Previous service, 1825–1829.	3rd term*	
208	Daniel Wardwell	J	NY-20	March 4, 1831	1st term	
209	John Goddard Watmough	AJ	PA-03	March 4, 1831	1st term	
210	Grattan H. Wheeler	AM	NY-28	March 4, 1831	1st term	Left the House in 1833.
211	Frederick Whittlesey	AM	NY-27	March 4, 1831	1st term	
212	Samuel J. Wilkin	AJ	NY-06	March 4, 1831	1st term	Left the House in 1833.
213	John Tolley Hood Worthington	J	MD-05	March 4, 1831	1st term	Left the House in 1833.
	John Branch	J	NC-02	May 12, 1831	1st term	Left the House in 1833.
	William Henry Ashley	J	MO	October 31, 1831	1st term	
	William Slade	AJ	VT-02	November 1, 1831	1st term	
	Robert McCoy	J	PA-11	November 22, 1831	1st term	Left the House in 1833.
	Micajah Thomas Hawkins	J	NC-06	December 15, 1831	1st term	
	Augustin Smith Clayton	J	GA	January 21, 1832	1st term	
	Charles S. Sewall	J	MD-06	October 1, 1832	1st term	Left the House in 1833.
	Joseph Draper	J	VA-22	December 6, 1832; Previous service, 1830–1831.	2nd term*	Left the House in 1833.
	Hiland Hall	AJ	VT-01	January 1, 1833	1st term	
	Joseph Johnson	J	VA-18	January 21, 1833; Previous service, 1823–1827.	3rd term*	Left the House in 1833.

== Delegates ==
Rank	Delegate	Party	District	Seniority date (Previous service, if any)	No.# of term(s)	Notes
1	Joseph M. White	J	FL	March 4, 1825	4th term	
2	Ambrose Hundley Sevier	J	AR	February 13, 1828	3rd term	
3	Austin Eli Wing	J	MI	March 4, 1831; Previous service, 1825–1829.	3rd term*	

== See also ==
- 22nd United States Congress
- List of United States congressional districts
- List of United States senators in the 22nd Congress
