= Jacob M. Wise =

American politician

Member of the Pennsylvania Senate from the 18th district
- In office 1827–1830
- Preceded by: Rees Hill
- Succeeded by: John Klingensmith Jr.

Personal details
- Party: Democratic

Jacob M. Wise was an American politician from Pennsylvania who served in the Pennsylvania State Senate, representing the 18th district from 1811 to 1818. During his tenure the 18th district represented Westmoreland County in Western Pennsylvania.

Wise was a prominent supporter of Andrew Jackson and his family consisted of many important early Democrats in Western Pennsylvania. Frederick A. Wise, was the editor in chief of the pro-Jacksonian Westmoreland Republican, and John H. Wise was a member of the Pennsylvania House of Representatives. Jacob, and his aforementioned family members, were part of the committee that first nominated Jackson for president on December 23, 1823, in front of Greensburg courthouse alongside David Marchand and James Clarke.
