= 1831 Pennsylvania's 11th congressional district special election =

Special election in the District of Pennsylvania, 1831

On November 22, 1831, a special election was held in Pennsylvania's 11th congressional district to fill a vacancy caused by the death of William Ramsey (D) on September 29, 1831.

== Election results ==
Candidate	Party	Votes	Percent
Robert McCoy	Democratic	2,459	44.4%
John D. Mahon	Independent	1,931	34.8%
James McSherry	Anti-Masonic	1,154	20.8%

McCoy took his seat December 5, 1831, at the start of the 1st session of the 22nd Congress

== See also ==
- List of special elections to the United States House of Representatives
