= John H. Wise (Pennsylvania politician) =

American politician (1788–1833)

John Henry Wise

Member of the Pennsylvania House of Representatives from Westmoreland County
- In office 1821–1824

Personal details
- Born: December 16, 1788
- Died: May 13, 1833 (aged 44)
- Party: Democratic

Military service
- Branch/service: United States
- Years of service: 1812-1824
- Rank: Brigadier general

John H. Wise (born December 16, 1788) was an American politician who was, arguably, one of the first Democratic officeholders, being a member of the Pennsylvania House of Representatives for Westmoreland County.

== Early life ==
John H. Wise was born on December 16, 1788. Wise came from a politically active family, his youngest brother, Jacob M. Wise, was a state senator, while the middle brother, Frederick Augustus Wise, was the owner and editor of the Westmoreland Republican. Their father, Henry, was a German immigrant. John served as a second lieutenant in the 22nd Infantry of the Pennsylvania Militia during the war of 1812 and was named the brigadier general of the 1st Brigade, 13th Division in 1821. Starting in 1814 John held various jobs around Greensburg including logging and watch making. Later that year he was elected the coroner of Westmoreland County and launched an unsuccessful bid to the Pennsylvania House of Representatives in 1816.

== Representative ==
Wise's second campaign was more successful, and he would be elected in 1820 and served three terms until 1824 when he unsuccessfully ran for Pennsylvania's 17th congressional district. On 23 December 1823 the three Wise brothers, alongside David Marchand and James Clarke, the so called Greensburg committee, signed the Greensburg Resolution formally calling on Andrew Jackson to run for President of the United States which started the chain of events that eventually formed the Democratic party in 1828. Pennsylvania House records list Wise was a Democrat, even though the party didn't formally exist yet.

== Later life ==
Wise died on May 13, 1833 and was interred in the Old Union Cemetery.
