= Westmoreland Republican =

Former newspaper published in Greensburg

- Owner(s): John M. Snowden (1799-1808); W. S. Graham (1808-1818); Frederick A. Wise (1818-1830); Joseph Russell (1830-1845); David K. Marchant (1845-1861); Andrew Graham (1861); James F. Campbell & Company (1861-1863); William A. Stokes (1863-1864); W. W. Keenan (1864-1865)
- Founder: John M. Snowden
- Editor: William McCorkle (first)
- Founded: 1799
- Ceased publication: 1865
- Political alignment: Democratic-Republican; Democratic
- Language: English
- City: Greensburg, Pennsylvania
- Country: United States
- OCLC number: 2269504

The Westmoreland Republican was a newspaper published in Greensburg, Westmoreland County, Pennsylvania from 1799 to 1865.

== History ==
=== The Register ===
The newspaper started life in 1799 as The Farmer’s Register, founded by John M. Snowden with William McCorkle as editor. Snowden, a native of Philadelphia struggled with his business ventures and sold the paper to W. S. Graham in 1808 who renamed the paper to The Greensburg and Indiana Register and later The Westmoreland and Indiana Register and lastly to just The Register in 1812 to save cost on printing the masthead. In 1811 newspaper cost $2.25 for a yearly subscription, and contained columns reporting on news in Europe, Congress, and occasionally printed addresses from the President, such as Thomas Jefferson's address to Alexander Hamilton's death. However, the newspaper struggled to stay afloat, and began selling space to rags to cover costs, allowing almost anyone to write in the paper under a pseudonym for a fee, including then congressmen William Findley.

=== Democratic-Republican takeover ===
In 1811 the Federalists established a newspaper in Greensburg named the Greensburg Gazette which spurred local Democratic Republicans, (Note: "Democratic Republican" is a retronym, as, at the time, the party was simply known as "Republicans", hence the name of the newspaper. The retronym was invented by Historians in order to differentiate the older party with the new, modern, Republican Party) led by Frederick A. Wise, to purchase the fledgling Register in 1818 renaming it to The Westmoreland Republican and Greensburg Register. Wise treated The Republican as a totally new paper distinct from The Register, printing a volume 1, issue 1, on Saturday, April 25, 1818. In 1825 the newspaper purchased its local rival, the Farmers' Chronicle and became The Westmoreland Republican and Farmers' Chronicle. The Wise family would be prominent local supporters of Andrew Jackson and the nascent Democratic Party, with Jacob M. Wise serving in the Pennsylvania State Senate, and John H. Wise in the Pennsylvania House of Representatives. The Wise family were part of the committee that first nominated Jackson for president on December 23, 1823, in front of Greensburg courthouse alongside David Marchand and James Clarke. In 1830 Wise sold the paper to one Joseph Russell in partnership with a local printer David K. Marchant, who bought Russell's shares in 1844, and then sold the paper to Andrew Graham in 1861 who quickly sold the paper to the James F. Campbell & Company who renamed the paper to just The Westmoreland Republican before selling the paper to local lawyer William A. Stokes in 1863. Stokes had been a longtime contributor to the newspaper, and sold it to W. W. Keenan, the owner of the rival Greensburg Democrat, in 1864, with the two papers merging and being renamed as The Republican and Democrat in 1865. In 1874 the paper was renamed to The Westmoreland Democrat and would remain in publication until closing in 1945.
