= James Clarke (Pennsylvania politician) =

American politician (1782–1867)

Member of the Pennsylvania House of Representatives from Westmoreland County
- In office 1822–1826

Personal details
- Born: March 14, 1782
- Died: October 1, 1867 (aged 85) Blairsville, Indiana
- Party: Democratic

James Clarke (born March 14, 1782) was an American politician who was an early Democratic officeholder, being a member of the Pennsylvania House of Representatives for Westmoreland County.

== Biography ==
James Clarke, sometimes spelled Clark, was born on March 14, 1782 and worked as an iron producer at the Washington Furnace. In 1819 he was elected as a commissioner for Westmoreland County.

He was elected as a Democrat to the state house in 1821, serving from 1822 to 1826. Clarke was a member of the five man Greensburg Committee and signed the Greensburg Resolution the first formal call for Andrew Jackson to run for president, alongside John H. Wise, Frederick A. Wise, Jacob M. Wise, and David Marchand. In 1824 he was appointed to the Pennsylvania Canal Commission by the state house.

Clarke had two unsuccessful bids for United States Congress for the 17th district first in 1826 and again in 1832. Clarke died on October 1, 1867 in Blairsville, Indiana.
