= Albert Gallatin Marchand =

American politician (1811–1848)

Member of the U.S. House of Representatives from Pennsylvania's 19th district
- In office March 4, 1839 – March 3, 1843
- Preceded by: John Klingensmith Jr.
- Succeeded by: Henry Donnel Foster

Personal details
- Born: February 27, 1811 near Greensburg, Pennsylvania, U.S.
- Died: February 5, 1848 (aged 36) Greensburg, Pennsylvania, U.S.
- Resting place: Greensburg Cemetery, Greensburg, Pennsylvania, U.S.
- Party: Democratic
- Spouse: Susan S. Kuhns (m. 1839)
- Children: 4
- Parent(s): David Marchand; Catherine Bonnett
- Occupation: Politician, lawyer

Albert Gallatin Marchand (February 27, 1811 – February 5, 1848) was an American politician who served in the United States House of Representatives from 1839 to 1843, representing the 19th congressional district of Pennsylvania as a Democrat in the 26th United States Congress and the 27th United States Congress.

== Early life and education ==
Marchand was born near Greensburg, Pennsylvania, on February 27, 1811. His father, David Marchand, served in the United States House of Representatives from 1817 to 1821, representing the 11th congressional district of Pennsylvania in the 15th United States Congress and the 16th United States Congress as a member of the Democratic-Republican Party.

Albert Marchand studied law.

== Career ==
Marchand was admitted to the bar in 1833; he commenced practice in Greensburg.

Marchand served in the United States House of Representatives from 1839 to 1843, representing the 19th congressional district of Pennsylvania as a Democrat in the 26th United States Congress and the 27th United States Congress. He served as chairman of the United States House Committee on Accounts in the latter Congress.

Marchand's time in office began on March 4, 1839, and concluded on March 3, 1843. He declined to be a candidate for renomination in 1842 to the 28th United States Congress.

Following his tenure in Congress, Marchand resumed practicing law in Greensburg.

== Personal life and death ==
Marchand married Susan S. Kuhns in 1839. They had four children together.

Marchand died at the age of 36 in Greensburg, Pennsylvania, on February 5, 1848. He was interred in Greensburg Cemetery, now St. Clair Cemetery.

== See also ==
- David Marchand, Albert Marchand's father, who also represented Pennsylvania in the United States House of Representatives

U.S. House of Representatives
Preceded by John Klingensmith Jr.	Member of the U.S. House of Representatives from Pennsylvania's 19th congressional district 1839–1843	Succeeded by Henry Donnel Foster
