= Chester P. Butler =

American politician (1798–1850)

Chester Pierce Butler
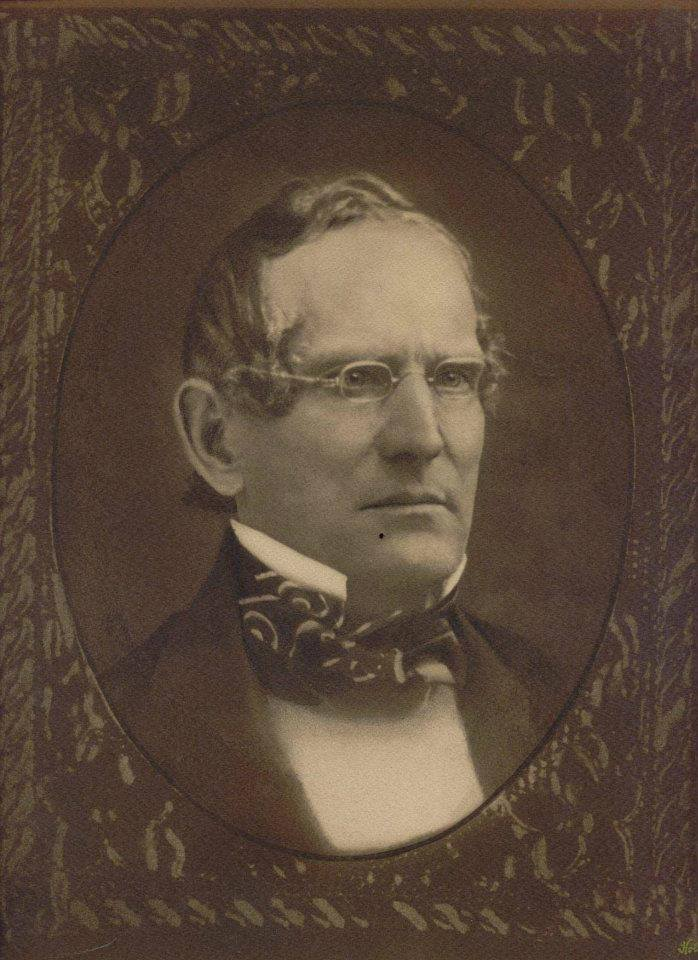

Member of the U.S. House of Representatives from Pennsylvania's 11th district
- In office March 4, 1847 – October 5, 1850
- Preceded by: Owen D. Leib
- Succeeded by: John Brisbin

Member of the Pennsylvania House of Representatives
- In office 1832–1833; 1838–1839; 1840; 1844

Personal details
- Born: March 21, 1798 Wilkes-Barre, Pennsylvania, U.S.
- Died: October 5, 1850 (aged 52) Philadelphia, Pennsylvania, U.S.
- Party: Anti-Mason; Whig
- Education: Princeton College; Litchfield Law School

Chester Pierce Butler (March 21, 1798 – October 5, 1850) was an American politician who served as an Anti-Masonic member of the Pennsylvania House of Representatives and Whig member of the U.S. House of Representatives from Pennsylvania.

== Early life and education ==
Chester P. Butler was born in Wilkes-Barre, Pennsylvania. He attended Wilkes-Barre Academy and graduated from Princeton College in 1817. He served as trustee of Wilkes-Barre Academy from 1818 to 1838 and served as secretary. He studied law at Litchfield Law School and was admitted to the bar in 1820.

== Career ==
Butler operated a private legal practice in Wilkes-Barre. He was register and recorder of Luzerne County, Pennsylvania, from 1821 to 1824. He was a member of the Pennsylvania House of Representatives in 1832 elected as an Anti-Mason, and again in 1838, 1839, and 1843 as a Whig.

Butler was elected as a Whig to the Thirtieth and Thirty-first Congresses and served until his death in Philadelphia in 1850. He was interred in the Hollenback Cemetery in Wilkes-Barre, Pennsylvania.

== See also ==
- List of members of the United States Congress who died in office (1790–1899)

== Sources ==
- United States Congress. "Chester P. Butler (id: B001175)". Biographical Directory of the United States Congress.
- The Political Graveyard

U.S. House of Representatives
| Preceded by Owen D. Leib | Member of the U.S. House of Representatives from Pennsylvania's 11th congressional district 1847–1850 | Succeeded by John Brisbin |
