= Richard Coulter (politician) =

American judge

Member of the U.S. House of Representatives from Pennsylvania
- In office March 4, 1827 – March 3, 1835
- Preceded by: George Plumer
- Succeeded by: John Klingensmith, Jr.
- Constituency: 17th district (1827–1833); 19th district (1833–1835)

Member of the Pennsylvania House of Representatives
- In office 1816-1820

Personal details
- Born: March 1788 Westmoreland County, Pennsylvania
- Died: April 21, 1852 (aged 64) Greensburg, Pennsylvania
- Party: Jacksonian

Richard Coulter (March 1788 – April 21, 1852) was a Jacksonian member of the U.S. House of Representatives from Pennsylvania.

Richard Coulter was born in Westmoreland County, Pennsylvania, a son of state commissioner Eli Coulter and Priscilla Small (1766–1826). Richard attended Jefferson College. He studied law, was admitted to the bar in 1811, and commenced the practice of his profession in Greensburg, Pennsylvania, where he became chief burgess. He was a member of the Pennsylvania House of Representatives from 1816 to 1820. He then returned to his law practice.

In 1826 Coulter was elected to the U.S. House of Representatives in the Twentieth Congress and reelected as a Jacksonian to the Twenty-first through Twenty-third Congresses. He was an unsuccessful candidate for reelection in 1834 to the Twenty-fourth Congress. He was elected judge of the Supreme Court of Pennsylvania and served from 1846 until his death in 1852 in Greensburg. Interment was in St. Clair Cemetery.

His namesake nephew Richard Coulter was an American Civil War general in the Union Army.

== Sources ==
- United States Congress. "Richard Coulter (id: C000808)". Biographical Directory of the United States Congress.
- The Political Graveyard
- "From Major General to Major Stockholder", by Jennifer Sopko, Westmoreland History, Summer 2007, page 12.

U.S. House of Representatives
Preceded by George Plumer	Member of the U.S. House of Representatives from Pennsylvania's 17th congressional district 1827–1833	Succeeded by John Laporte
Preceded by District Created	Member of the U.S. House of Representatives from Pennsylvania's 19th congressional district 1833–1835	Succeeded by John Klingensmith, Jr.
