= Owen D. Leib =

American politician

Member of the U.S. House of Representatives from Pennsylvania's 11th district
- In office March 4, 1845 – March 3, 1847
- Preceded by: Benjamin A. Bidlack
- Succeeded by: Chester P. Butler

Personal details
- Born: c. 1803 Pennsylvania, U.S.
- Died: June 17, 1848 (aged 45) Catawissa, Pennsylvania, U.S.
- Party: Democratic

Owen D. Leib (c. 1803 - June 17, 1848) was a Democratic member of the U.S. House of Representatives from Pennsylvania.

== Biography ==
Leib was born in Pennsylvania. He studied medicine and commenced practice in Catawissa, Pennsylvania.

Leib was elected as a Democrat to the Twenty-ninth Congress. He served as chairman of the United States House Committee on Expenditures in the Department of War. He died in Catawissa in 1848.

== Sources ==
- United States Congress. "Owen D. Leib (id: L000230)". Biographical Directory of the United States Congress.
- The Political Graveyard

U.S. House of Representatives
Preceded by Benjamin A. Bidlack	Member of the U.S. House of Representatives from Pennsylvania's 11th congressional district 1845–1847	Succeeded by Chester P. Butler
