= Robert Klotz =

American politician

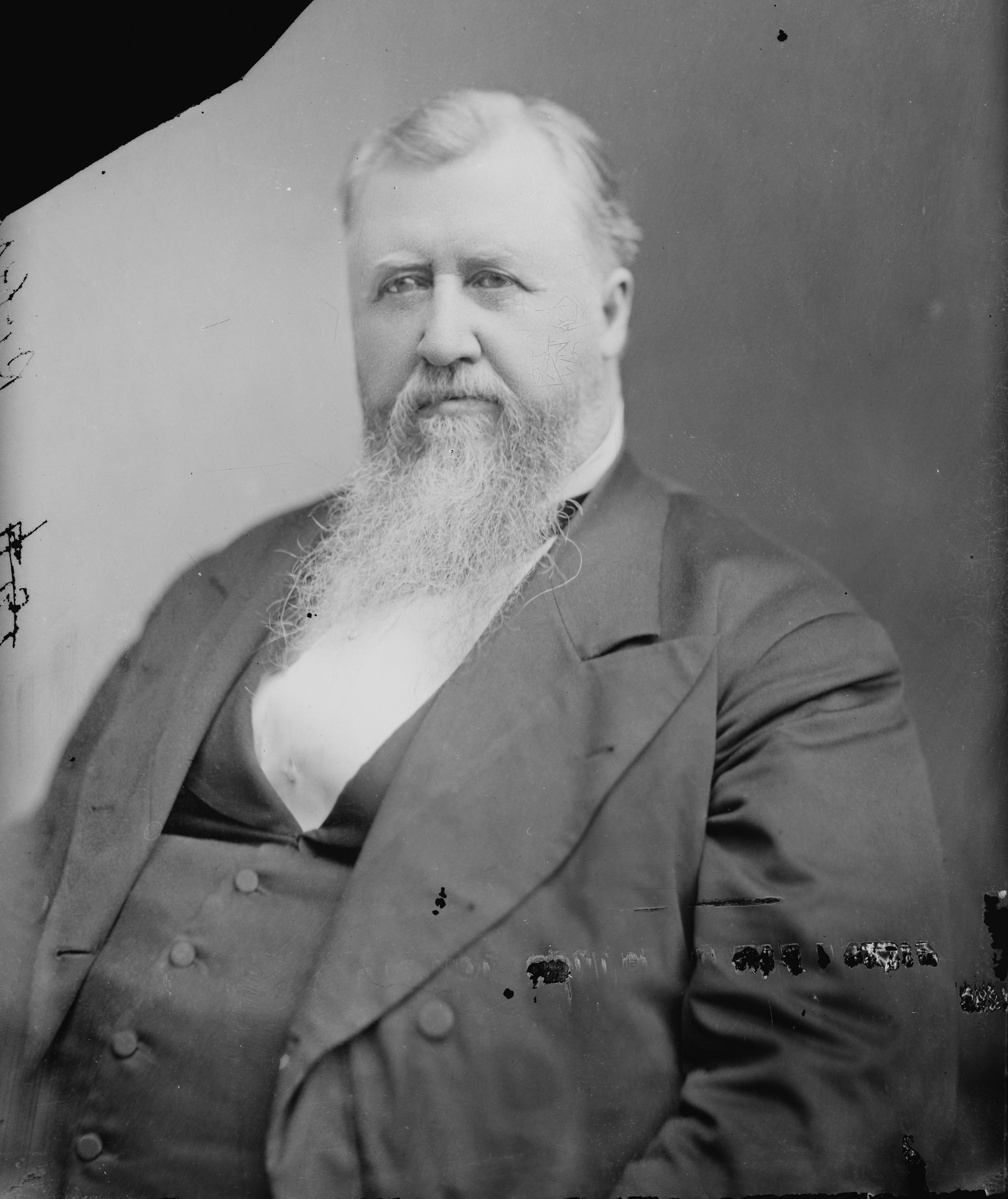

Member of the U.S. House of Representatives from Pennsylvania's 11th district
- In office March 4, 1879 – March 3, 1883
- Preceded by: Francis D. Collins
- Succeeded by: John B. Storm

Member of the Pennsylvania House of Representatives
- In office 1848–1849

Personal details
- Born: October 27, 1819 Northampton County, Pennsylvania, U.S.
- Died: May 1, 1895 (aged 75) Mauch Chunk, Pennsylvania, U.S.
- Party: Democratic

Robert Klotz (October 27, 1819 – May 1, 1895) was a Democratic member of the U.S. House of Representatives from Pennsylvania.

== Biography ==
Robert Klotz was born in Northampton (now Carbon) County, Pennsylvania. He attended the county's schools. He was the first register and recorder of Carbon County in 1843.

During the war with Mexico, he served in the Second Pennsylvania Volunteers as a private, lieutenant, and adjutant in 1846 and 1847. He was a member of the Pennsylvania State House of Representatives in 1848 and was reelected in 1849.

He moved to Pawnee, Kansas, in 1855. He was a member of the Topeka, Kansas, constitutional convention in 1855 and served as the first Secretary of State of Kansas under the constitution adopted. He was a brigadier general under Governor Charles Robinson.

He returned to Mauch Chunk, Pennsylvania, in 1857. He served as treasurer of Carbon County, Pennsylvania in 1859.

Klotz enlisted in the Union Army in 1861, and was chosen colonel of the Nineteenth Pennsylvania Emergency Militia in 1862. He served as a trustee of Lehigh University in Bethlehem, Pennsylvania, from 1874 to 1882.

Klotz was elected as a Democrat to the Forty-sixth and Forty-seventh Congresses. He served as director and agent of the Laflin & Rand Powder Company in New York City.

== Death ==
He died at his home in Mauch Chunk in present-day Jim Thorpe, Pennsylvania, on May 1, 1895. He was buried at City Cemetery.

U.S. House of Representatives
Preceded by Francis D. Collins	Member of the U.S. House of Representatives from Pennsylvania's 11th congressional district 1879 - 1883	Succeeded by John B. Storm
