= Rev. Anderson B. Quay House =

Historic house in Pennsylvania, United States

- U.S. National Register of Historic Places
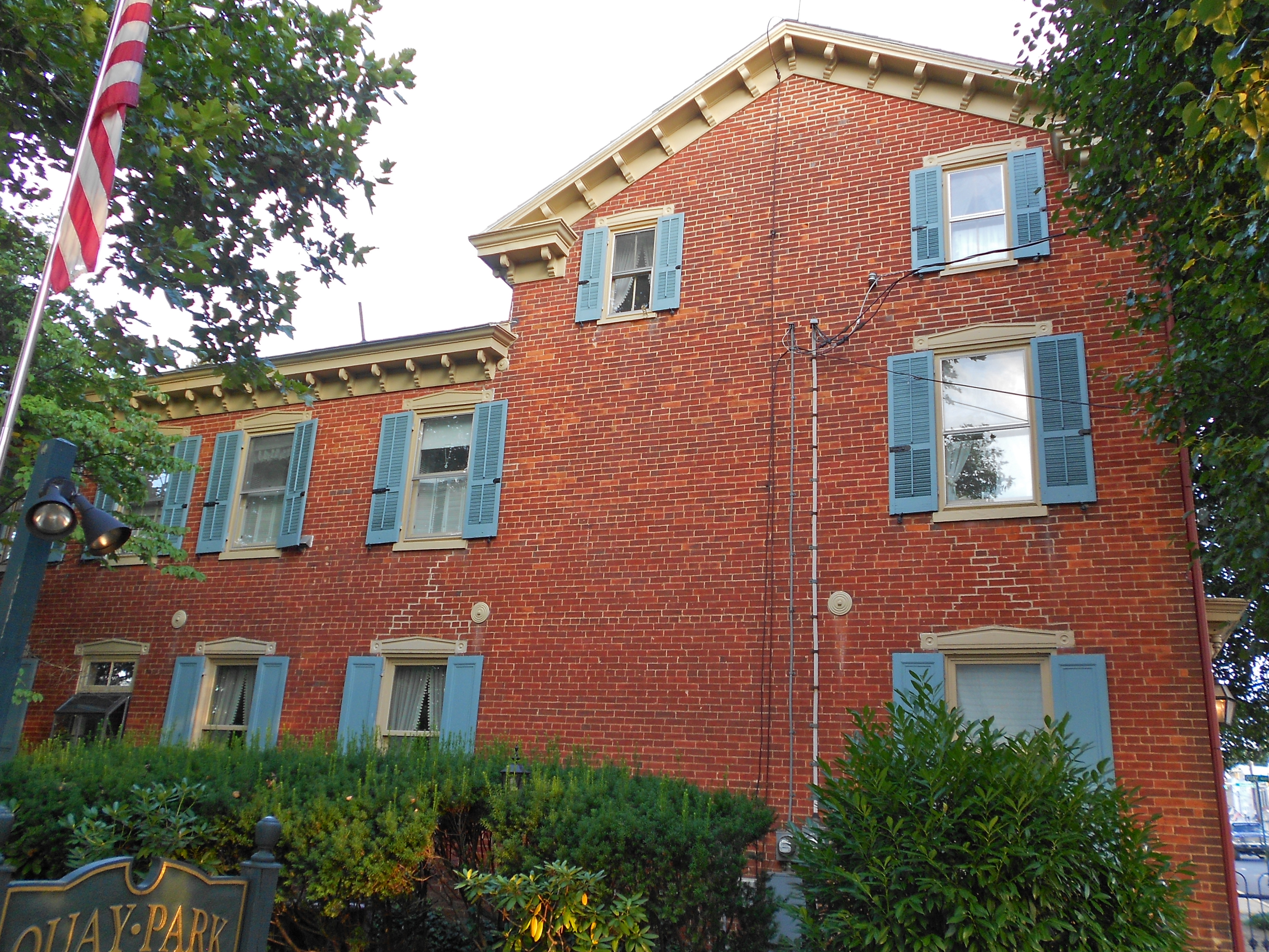

- Location within Pennsylvania Location within the United States
- Location: 22 N. Baltimore St., Dillsburg, Pennsylvania
- Coordinates: 40°6′41″N 77°2′9″W
- Area: less than one acre
- Architectural style: Italianate, Queen Anne, Greek Revival
- NRHP reference No.: 97001255
- Added to NRHP: October 24, 1997

Rev. Anderson B. Quay House is a historic home located in Dillsburg, Pennsylvania. It is a 2 1/2-story, L-shaped brick building. The original section was built in 1831 in the Greek Revival style. Around 1880, ornate Italianate and Queen Anne elements were added to the exterior. Key features include a shallow-pitched roof, bracketed windows and door hoods, and a spindlework porch frieze.

It was added to the National Register of Historic Places in 1997.
