= James Gerry =

American politician (1796–1873)

Member of the U.S. House of Representatives from Pennsylvania's 11th district
- In office March 4, 1839 – March 3, 1843
- Preceded by: Henry Logan
- Succeeded by: Benjamin A. Bidlack

Personal details
- Born: James Gerry Jr. August 14, 1796 near Rising Sun, Maryland, U.S.
- Died: July 19, 1873 (aged 76) Shrewsbury, Pennsylvania, U.S.
- Resting place: Lutheran Cemetery, Shrewsbury, Pennsylvania, U.S.
- Party: Democratic
- Spouse: Sarah Salome Hoffman (m. 1830)
- Parent(s): James Gerry Sr. Florah Low
- Education: West Nottingham Academy; University of Maryland
- Profession: Politician, physician

James Gerry Jr. (August 14, 1796 – July 19, 1873) was an American politician and physician who served in the United States House of Representatives from 1839 to 1843, representing the 11th congressional district of Pennsylvania as a Democrat in the 26th United States Congress and the 27th United States Congress.

== Early life and education ==
Gerry was born near Rising Sun, Maryland, on August 14, 1796, to James Gerry Sr. and Florah Low. He graduated from West Nottingham Academy and studied medicine at the University of Maryland in Baltimore before commencing practice in Shrewsbury, Pennsylvania, in 1824.

== Career ==
Gerry was elected as a Democrat to the 26th United States Congress and the 27th United States Congress. He served from March 4, 1839, to March 3, 1843, representing the 11th congressional district of Pennsylvania.

Following his tenure in Congress, Gerry resumed practicing medicine until his retirement in 1870.

== Death ==
Gerry married Sarah Salome Hoffman in 1830.

Gerry died at the age of 76 in Shrewsbury, Pennsylvania, on July 19, 1873. He was interred in Lutheran Cemetery, located in Shrewbsury.

U.S. House of Representatives
Preceded by Henry Logan	Member of the U.S. House of Representatives from Pennsylvania's 11th congressional district 1839–1843	Succeeded by Benjamin A. Bidlack
