= James Wilson (Pennsylvania politician) =

American politician

James Wilson (April 28, 1779 – July 19, 1868) was a member of the U.S. House of Representatives from Pennsylvania.

James Wilson was born in Millerstown, Pennsylvania (now Fairfield). He attended the common schools and learned the trade of cabinetmaker. He engaged in mercantile pursuits and also interested in the real estate business. He was a justice of the peace from 1811 to 1822.

Wilson was elected to the Eighteenth, Nineteenth, and Twentieth Congresses. He was again a justice of the peace from 1830 to 1859. He died in Gettysburg, Pennsylvania. Interment in Evergreen Cemetery.

== Sources ==
- United States Congress. "James Wilson (id: W000588)". Biographical Directory of the United States Congress.
- The Political Graveyard

U.S. House of Representatives
Preceded by George Plumer	Member of the U.S. House of Representatives from Pennsylvania's 11th congressional district 1823–1829 1823–1827 alongside: John Findlay; 1827–1829 alongside: William Ramsey	Succeeded by Thomas Hartley Crawford; William Ramsey
