= Charles Augustus Barnitz =

American politician

Member of the U.S. House of Representatives from Pennsylvania's 11th district
- In office March 4, 1833 – March 3, 1835
- Preceded by: Thomas Hartley Crawford, Robert McCoy
- Succeeded by: Henry Logan

Member of the Pennsylvania Senate for the 11th district
- In office 1815-1819
- Preceded by: James McSherry
- Succeeded by: Frederick Eichelberger

Personal details
- Born: September 11, 1780 Williams Township, Pennsylvania
- Died: January 8, 1850 (aged 69)
- Party: Anti-Masonic

Charles Augustus Barnitz (September 11, 1780 – January 8, 1850) was an American politician who served as an Anti-Masonic member of the U.S. House of Representatives for Pennsylvania's 11th congressional district from 1833 to 1835.

== Early life and education ==
Barnitz was born in York, Pennsylvania to Jacob (of German descent) and Mary McClean Barnitz. He received his education at the York Academy. He studied law, was admitted to the bar in 1811 and commenced practice in York.

== Career ==
He was a member of the Pennsylvania State Senate for the 11th district from 1815 to 1819.

From 1820 until his death he served as agent of the heirs of William Penn for their interests in Springettsbury Manor, the center of which is now the city of York.

Barnitz was elected as an Anti-Masonic candidate to the Twenty-third Congress. He was not a candidate for reelection in 1834 to the Twenty-fourth Congress. He resumed the practice of law at York and was also engaged in banking and served as president of the York Bank. He was member of the State constitutional convention in 1838 and a delegate to the Whig National Conventions at Harrisburg, Pennsylvania, in 1840 and at Baltimore, Maryland, in 1844. He died in York in 1850. Interment in the First Presbyterian Churchyard.

== Sources ==
- United States Congress. "Charles Augustus Barnitz (id: B000165)". Biographical Directory of the United States Congress.
- The Political Graveyard
- Lawyers and Leaders: The Role of Lawyers in the Development of York County, Pennsylvania, 2005, ISBN 978-0-9766629-0-7, York County Bar Association by Georg R. Sheets

Pennsylvania State Senate
Preceded by James McSherry	Member of the Pennsylvania Senate, 11th district 1815-1819	Succeeded by Frederick Eichelberger
U.S. House of Representatives
Preceded by Thomas Hartley Crawford; Robert McCoy	Member of the U.S. House of Representatives from Pennsylvania's 11th congressional district 1833–1835	Succeeded by Henry Logan
