= John B. Storm =

American politician

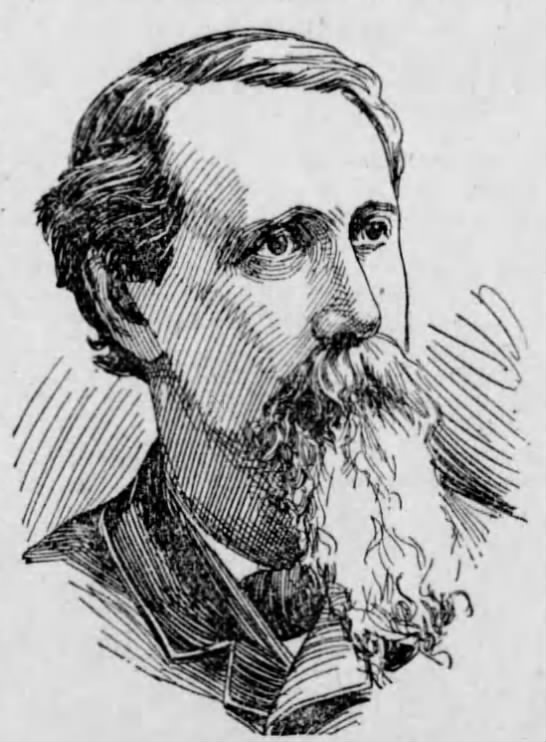
The Philadelphia Times (February 16, 1896)

John Brutzman Storm (September 19, 1838 – August 13, 1901) was a Democratic member of the U.S. House of Representatives from Pennsylvania.

John B. Storm was born in Hamilton Township, Monroe County, Pennsylvania. He attended the common schools, and was graduated from Dickinson College, in Carlisle, Pennsylvania, in 1861. He studied law, was admitted to the bar in 1863 and commenced practice in Stroudsburg, Pennsylvania. He served as county superintendent of public schools for seven years.

Storm was elected as a Democrat to the Forty-second and Forty-third Congresses. He was not a candidate for renomination in 1874. He was again elected to the Forty-eighth and Forty-ninth Congresses. He was not a candidate for renomination in 1886. He resumed the practice of law, and served as president judge of the forty-third judicial district of Pennsylvania. He died in Stroudsburg in 1901. Interment in Stroudsburg Cemetery.

== Sources ==
- United States Congress. "John B. Storm (id: S000975)". Biographical Directory of the United States Congress.
- The Political Graveyard

U.S. House of Representatives
Preceded by Daniel M. Van Auken	Member of the U.S. House of Representatives from Pennsylvania's 11th congressional district 1871 - 1875	Succeeded by Francis D. Collins
Preceded by Robert Klotz	Member of the U.S. House of Representatives from Pennsylvania's 11th congressional district 1883 - 1887	Succeeded by Charles R. Buckalew
