= Henry Wells Tracy =

American politician from Pennsylvania (1807–1886)

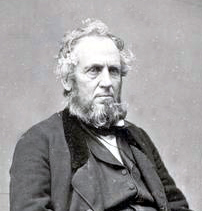

Member of the U.S. House of Representatives from Pennsylvania's 13th district
- In office March 4, 1863 – March 3, 1865
- Preceded by: Philip Johnson
- Succeeded by: Ulysses Mercur

Personal details
- Born: September 24, 1807 Ulster Township, Pennsylvania, U.S.
- Died: April 11, 1886 (aged 78) Standing Stone Township, Pennsylvania, U.S.
- Resting place: Wysox, Pennsylvania
- Party: Independent Republican
- Education: Angelica Seminary

Henry Wells Tracy (September 24, 1807 – April 11, 1886) was an Independent Republican member of the U.S. House of Representatives from Pennsylvania.

== Formative years ==
Henry W. Tracy was born in Ulster Township, Pennsylvania on September 24, 1807. He attended the Angelica Seminary in Allegany County, New York.

== Career ==
Tracy studied law, engaged in mercantile pursuits and as a road contractor in Standing Stone, Pennsylvania, Havre de Grace, Maryland, and Towanda, Pennsylvania. He was a delegate to the 1860 Republican National Convention. He was a member of the Pennsylvania House of Representatives in 1861 and 1862.

Tracy was elected as an Independent Republican to the Thirty-eighth Congress. He served as collector of the port of Philadelphia in 1866. He resumed mercantile pursuits.

== Death and interment ==
Tracy died at Standing Stone in 1886, aged 78. He was interred in the Brick Church Cemetery in Wysox, Pennsylvania.

== Sources ==
- United States Congress. "Henry Wells Tracy (id: T000345)". Biographical Directory of the United States Congress.
- The Political Graveyard

U.S. House of Representatives
Preceded by Philip Johnson	Member of the U.S. House of Representatives from Pennsylvania's 13th congressional district 1863–1865	Succeeded by Ulysses Mercur
