= List of United States senators in the 22nd Congress =

This is a complete list of United States senators during the 22nd United States Congress listed by seniority from March 4, 1831, to March 3, 1833.

Order of service is based on the commencement of the senator's first term. Behind this is former service as a senator (only giving the senator seniority within their new incoming class), service as vice president, a House member, a cabinet secretary, or a governor of a state. The final factor is the population of the senator's state.

Senators who were sworn in during the middle of the two-year congressional term (up until the last senator who was not sworn in early after winning the November 1832 election) are listed at the end of the list with no number.

== Terms of service ==
Class	Terms of service of senators that expired in years
Class 1	Terms of service of senators that expired in 1833 (CT, DE, IN, MA, MD, ME, MO, MS, NJ, NY, OH, PA, RI, TN, VA, and VT.)
Class 2	Terms of service of senators that expired in 1835 (AL, DE, GA, IL, KY, LA, MA, ME, MS, NC, NH, NJ, RI, SC, and VA.)
Class 3	Terms of service of senators that expired in 1837 (AL, CT, GA, IL, IN, KY, LA, MD, MO, NC, NH, NY, OH, PA, SC, TN, and VT.)

== U.S. Senate seniority list ==
U.S. Senate seniority
Rank	Senator (party-state)	Seniority date	Other factors
1	Benjamin Ruggles (AJ-OH)	March 4, 1815	
2	Mahlon Dickerson (J-NJ)	March 4, 1817	
3	William Rufus de Vane King (J-AL)	December 14, 1819	
4	Nehemiah Rice Knight (AJ-RI)	January 9, 1821	
5	Horatio Seymour (AJ-VT)	March 4, 1821	
6	Thomas Hart Benton (J-MO)	August 10, 1821	
7	Samuel Smith (J-MD)	December 17, 1822	
8	Samuel Bell (AJ-NH)	March 4, 1823	Former governor
9	Robert Young Hayne (N-NH)	March 4, 1823	
10	Josiah Stoddard Johnston (AJ-LA)	January 15, 1824	
11	Littleton Waller Tazewell (J-VA)	December 7, 1824	
12	William Hendricks (AJ-IN)	March 4, 1825	Former representative
13	Elias Kent Kane (J-IL)	March 4, 1825	Illinois 24th in population (1820)
14	Hugh Lawson White (J-TN)	October 28, 1825	
15	Ashur Robbins (AJ-RI)	October 31, 1825	
16	Ezekiel Forman Chambers (AJ-VA)	January 24, 1826	
17	Nathaniel Silsbee (AJ-MA)	May 31, 1826	
18	Powhatan Ellis (J-MS)	March 4, 1827	Former senator
19	John Tyler (J-VA)	March 4, 1827	Former representative (4 years, 2 months)
20	Samuel Augustus Foot (AJ-CT)	March 4, 1827	Former representative (4 years, 0 months)
21	Isaac Dutton Barnard (J-PA)	March 4, 1827	
22	Daniel Webster (AJ-MA)	June 8, 1827	
23	John Holmes (AJ-ME)	January 15, 1829	Former representative
24	Charles Edward Dudley (J-NY)	January 15, 1829	
25	George Mortimer Bibb (J-KY)	March 4, 1829	Former senator (3 years)
26	George Michael Troup (J-GA)	March 4, 1829	Former senator (1 year)
27	Edward Livingston (J-LA)	March 4, 1829	Former representative (12 years)
28	Peleg Sprague (AJ-ME)	March 4, 1829	Former representative (4 years)
29	Theodore Frelinghuysen (AJ-NJ)	March 4, 1829	New Jersey 13th in population (1820)
30	John Middleton Clayton (AJ-DE)	March 4, 1829	Delaware 22nd in population (1820)
31	Felix Grundy (J-TN)	October 19, 1829	
32	John Forsyth (J-GA)	November 9, 1829	
33	Bedford Brown (J-NC)	December 9, 1829	
34	Arnold Naudain (AJ-DE)	January 13, 1830	
35	George Poindexter (J-MS)	October 15, 1830	
36	John McCracken Robinson (J-IL)	December 11, 1830	
37	Gideon Tomlinson (AJ-CT)	March 4, 1831	Former representative (8 years); Connecticut 14th in population (1820)
38	Gabriel Moore (J-AL)	March 4, 1831	Former representative (8 years); Alabama 19th in population (1820)
39	Willie Person Mangum (J-NC)	March 4, 1831	Former representative (3 years)
40	Stephen Decatur Miller (N-NC)	March 4, 1831	Former representative (2 years)
41	William Learned Marcy (J-NY)	March 4, 1831	New York 1st in population (1820)
42	William Wilkins (J-PA)	March 4, 1831	Pennsylvania 2nd in population (1820)
43	Thomas Ewing (AJ-OH)	March 4, 1831	Ohio 5th in population (1820)
44	Isaac Hill (J-NH)	March 4, 1831	New Hampshire 15th in population (1820)
45	Samuel Prentiss (AJ-VT)	March 4, 1831	Vermont 16th in population (1820)
46	Alexander Buckner (J-MO)	March 4, 1831	Missouri 23rd in population (1820)
47	Robert Hanna (AJ-IN)	August 19, 1831	
48	Henry Clay (AJ-KY)	November 10, 1831	
	George Augustus Waggaman (AJ-LA)	November 15, 1831	
	George Mifflin Dallas (J-PA)	December 13, 1831	
	John Tipton (J-IN)	January 3, 1832	
	John Black (J-MS)	November 12, 1832	
	William Cabell Rives (J-VA)	December 10, 1832	
	John Caldwell Calhoun (N-SC)	December 29, 1832	

== See also ==
- 22nd United States Congress
- List of United States representatives in the 22nd Congress
