= Daniel Myers Van Auken =

American politician

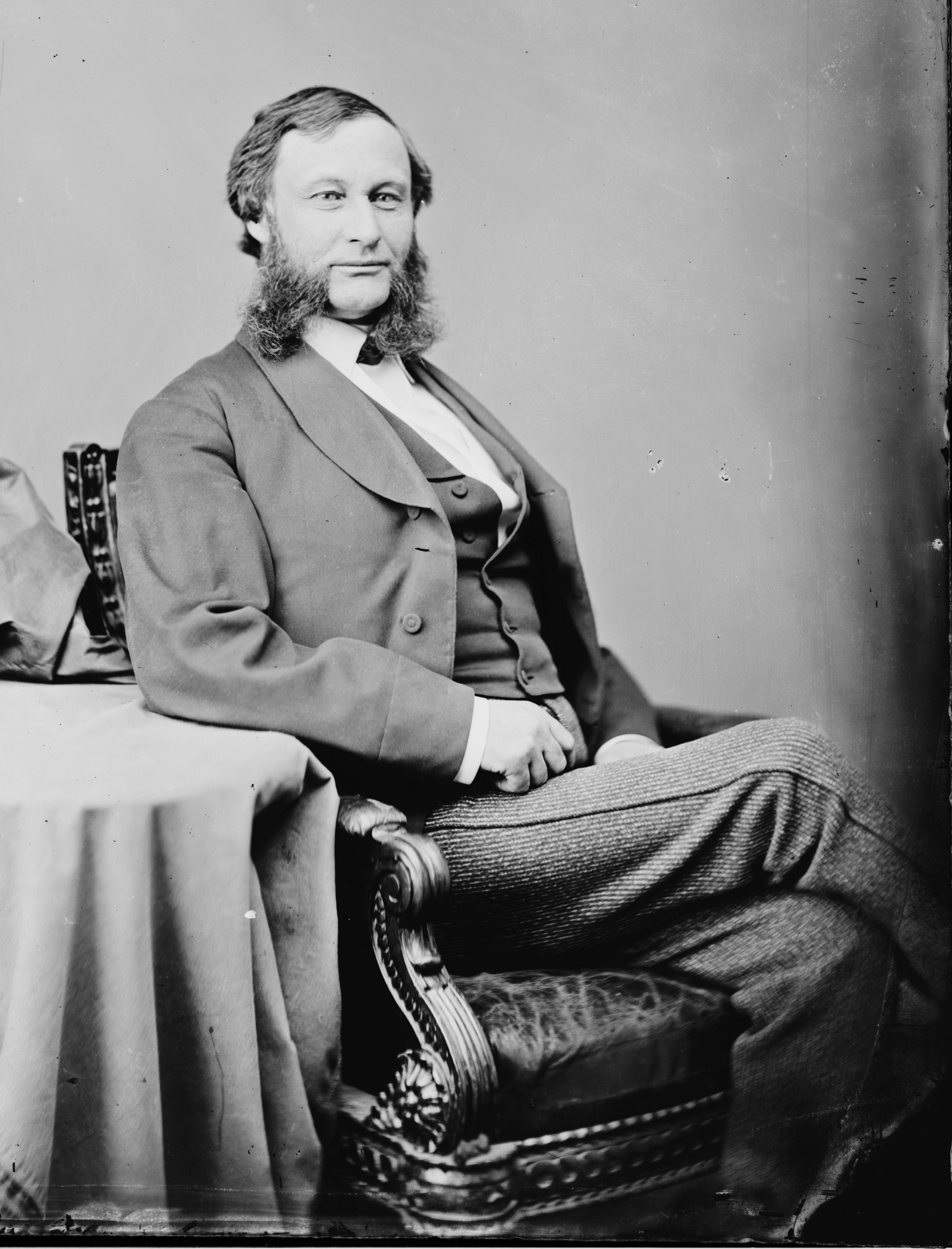

Member of the U.S. House of Representatives from Pennsylvania's 11th district
- In office March 4, 1867 – – March 3, 1871
- Preceded by: Philip Johnson
- Succeeded by: John B. Storm

Personal details
- Born: January 15, 1826 Montague Township, New Jersey, U.S.
- Died: November 7, 1908 (aged 82) Milford, Pennsylvania, U.S.
- Resting place: Milford Cemetery.
- Party: Democratic
- Education: Deckertown Academy; Union College

Daniel Myers Van Auken (January 15, 1826 – November 7, 1908) was a Democratic member of the U.S. House of Representatives from Pennsylvania.

Daniel M. Van Auken was born in Montague Township, New Jersey. He attended the common schools and Deckertown Academy. He graduated from Union College in Schenectady, New York, in 1852. He studied law, was admitted to the Pennsylvania bar in 1855 and commenced the practice of law in Milford, Pennsylvania. He served as prosecuting attorney of Pike County, Pennsylvania, from 1855 to 1859. Van Auken was the first Worshipful Master of the Milford Masonic Lodge, No. 344 (which was then No. 82) in Milford, PA from 1862 through 1864.

Van Auken was elected as a Democrat to the Fortieth and Forty-first Congresses. He was not a candidate for reelection in 1870. He resumed the practice of law in Milford and served as district attorney of Pike County from 1893 to 1896 and 1899 to 1903. He continued the practice of law until his death in Milford in 1908. Interment in Milford Cemetery.

== Personal life ==
On November 24, 1857, he married Marcia Ross Brodhead (1834–1885), descendant of an early New York family. Her sister, Kate Ross Brodhead, was married to Congressman and Senator Charles Van Wyck of New York and Nebraska. Her first cousin, Henrietta Laura Brodhead, married Civil War US Army Colonel Samuel Fowler, son of Congressman Samuel Fowler. They became the parents of Congressman Samuel Fowler (III). Additionally, she was a cousin of Congressmen John Curtis Brodhead of New York and John Brodhead of New Hampshire.

They had three children:

1. Grace Brodhead (Van Auken) Mott (1859–1903)
2. Ross Brodhead Van Auken (1861–1900)
3. Florida McElraith Van Auken (1867–1906)

== Sources ==
- United States Congress. "Daniel Myers Van Auken (id: V000014)". Biographical Directory of the United States Congress.
- The Political Graveyard

U.S. House of Representatives
Preceded by Philip Johnson	Member of the U.S. House of Representatives from Pennsylvania's 11th congressional district 1867–1871	Succeeded by John B. Storm
