= Henry Logan (politician) =

American politician (1784–1866)

Member of the U.S. House of Representatives from Pennsylvania's 11th district
- In office March 4, 1835 – March 3, 1839
- Preceded by: Charles A. Barnitz
- Succeeded by: James Gerry

Member of the Pennsylvania House of Representatives
- In office 1818–1819

Member of the Pennsylvania Senate for the 14th district
- In office 1828–1830
- Preceded by: Zephaniah Herbert
- Succeeded by: Ezra Blyth

Personal details
- Born: April 14, 1784 Dillsburg, Pennsylvania, US
- Died: December 26, 1866 (aged 82) Dillsburg, Pennsylvania, US
- Party: Democratic, Jacksonian

Henry Logan (April 14, 1784 – December 26, 1866) was an American politician from Pennsylvania who served as a Democratic member of the U.S. House of Representatives for Pennsylvania's 11th congressional district from 1835 to 1839.

Henry Logan was born near Dillsburg, Pennsylvania. He volunteered for the defense of Baltimore in 1814 during the War of 1812, and served as captain in the Nineteenth Regiment, Second Brigade, Fifth Division, Pennsylvania Militia. He was commissioned lieutenant colonel August 1, 1814.

He served as a member of the Pennsylvania House of Representatives from 1818 and 1819 and as a member of the Pennsylvania State Senate for the 14th district from 1828 to 1830.

Logan was elected as a Jacksonian to the Twenty-fourth Congress and reelected as a Democrat to the Twenty-fifth Congress. He was not a candidate for renomination and resumed farming.

He was a member of the Board of Commissioners of York County, Pennsylvania, in 1840. He served as county auditor and died on the Logania plantation in Monaghan Township, near Dillsburg in 1866. Interment in the Dillsburg Cemetery in Dillsburg, Pennsylvania.

== Legacy ==
The town Loganville, Pennsylvania was named after him.

== Sources ==
- United States Congress. "Henry Logan (id: L000402)". Biographical Directory of the United States Congress.
- The Political Graveyard

Pennsylvania House of Representatives
| Preceded by | Member of the Pennsylvania House of Representatives; 1818-1819 | Succeeded by |
Pennsylvania State Senate
| Preceded by Zephaniah Herbert | Member of the Pennsylvania Senate, 14th district 1828-1830 | Succeeded by Ezra Blythe |
U.S. House of Representatives
| Preceded by Charles A. Barnitz | Member of the U.S. House of Representatives from Pennsylvania's 11th congressional district 1835–1839 | Succeeded by James Gerry |
