= John Brisbin =

American politician (1818–1880)

Member of the U.S. House of Representatives from Pennsylvania's 11th district
- In office January 15, 1851 – March 3, 1851
- Preceded by: Chester P. Butler
- Succeeded by: Henry Mills Fuller

Personal details
- Born: July 13, 1818 Sherburne, New York, U.S.
- Died: February 3, 1880 (aged 61) Newark, New Jersey, U.S.
- Resting place: Evergreen Cemetery, Hillside, New Jersey, U.S.
- Party: Democratic
- Spouse: Adelia Malvina Remsen (m. 1841)
- Profession: Politician, lawyer, educator

John Brisbin (July 13, 1818 – February 3, 1880) was an American politician, lawyer, and educator who briefly served in the United States House of Representatives in 1851, representing the 11th congressional district of Pennsylvania as a Democrat in the 31st United States Congress.

== Early life and education ==
Brisbin was born in Sherburne, New York, on July 13, 1818. He taught school and studied law.

== Career ==
Brisbin was admitted to the bar; he commenced practice in Tunkhannock, Pennsylvania around the year 1843.

Brisbin was elected as a Democrat to the 31st United States Congress to fill the vacancy caused by the death of incumbent Chester P. Butler. He served from January 15, 1851, to March 3, 1851, representing the 11th congressional district of Pennsylvania.

Brisbin served as president of the Delaware, Lackawanna and Western Railroad company from 1863 to 1867. Additionally, he served as a member of the board of managers and general counsel from 1867 to his death in 1880.

== Personal life and death ==
Brisbin married Adelia Malvina Remsen in 1841.

Brisbin died at the age of 61 in Newark, New Jersey, on February 3, 1880. He was interred in Evergreen Cemetery, located in Hillside, New Jersey.

U.S. House of Representatives
Preceded by Chester P. Butler	Member of the U.S. House of Representatives from Pennsylvania's 11th congressional district 1851	Succeeded by Henry Mills Fuller
