= Dill's Tavern =

- U.S. National Register of Historic Places
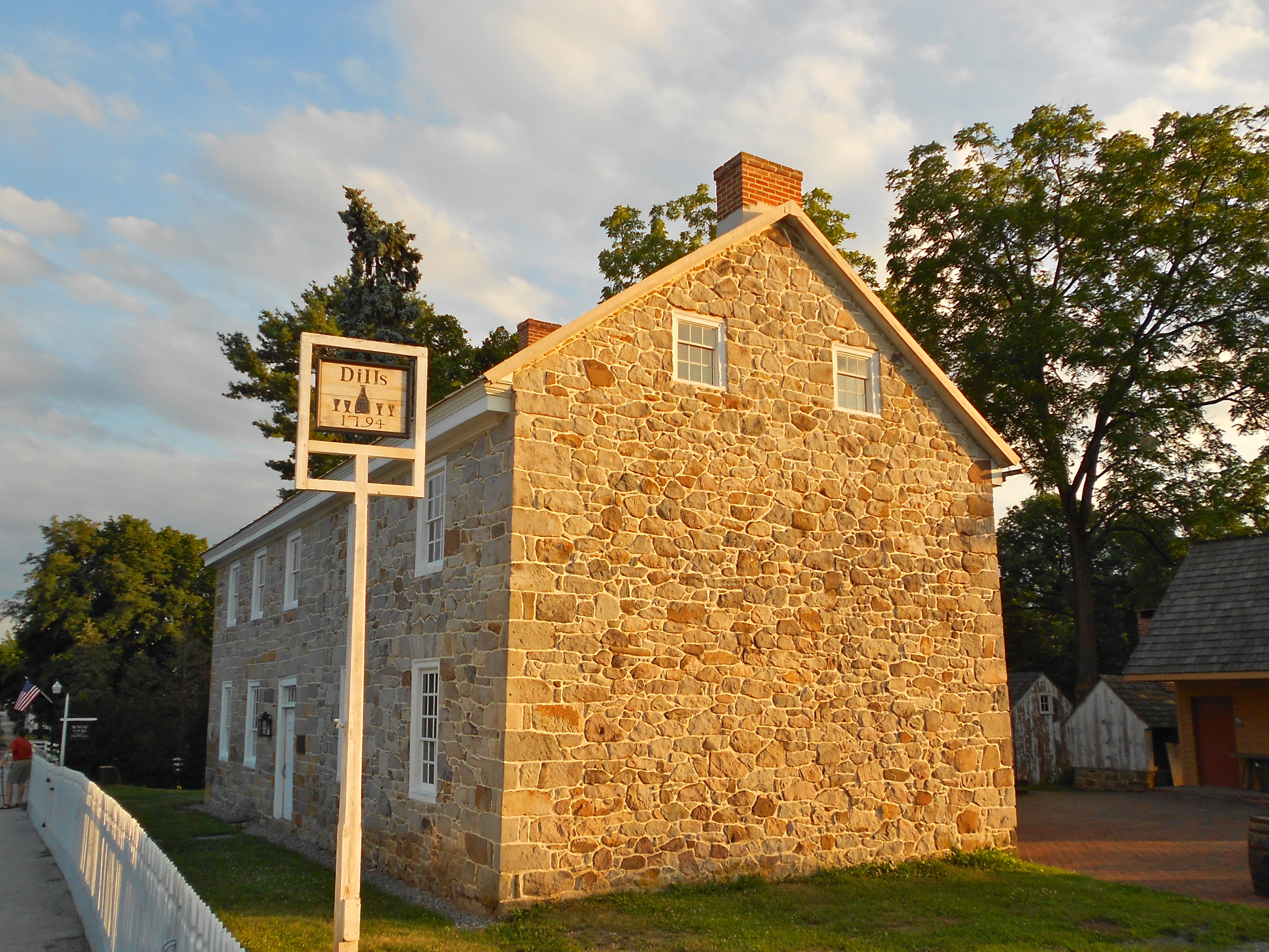

- Location within Pennsylvania Location within the United States
- Location: 227 N. Baltimore St., Dillsburg, Pennsylvania
- Coordinates: 40°6′55″N 77°2′14″W
- Area: 1.4 acres (0.57 ha)
- Built: 1755, 1800, 1820, 1835, 1910
- Architectural style: Early Republic, Colonial Revival
- NRHP reference No.: 04000195
- Added to NRHP: March 18, 2004

Dill's Tavern, also known as Eichelberger's Tavern and The Logan House, is a historic site located at Dillsburg, Pennsylvania. The Irish settler Matthew Dill began establishing the Monaghan settlement in 1742 which later boasted a wooden tavern or way-station with the same name, productive agricultural yields, and a whiskey still. The 190 acre plantation grew to encompass 650 acres located just south of the Dill's Gap on the northern end of the South Mountain range between what is Cumberland County and York County. Matthew Dill's son James Dill inherited the property after his father's death in 1742 and expanded on his father's business. James Dill's son, John Dill, was transferred 393 acres of the 650 acre plantation in 1784. John Dill later constructed the stone Tavern in 1794 to replace the old tavern that was probably made of wood. John Dill expanded production on the plantation to have a stable for herders and drovers moving livestock, two log barns, a granary, bakehouse, and spring house including improved lodging accommodations for travelers. The property was deeded to Leonard Eichelberger in 1800 that later expanded and tripled the size of the original stone Tavern built by John Dill and continued to run the distillery and tavern as well as his wagon building and wheelwright business on the plantation.

Dill's Tavern stands as is a large, 2 ^{1}/_{2}-story, L-shaped sandstone building in a vernacular Federal style. It was originally built about 1794, with additions made about 1800, 1820, and 1910, and Colonial Revival-style alterations made about 1935. It housed a tavern until 1835, after which it was a private residence and an antiques store.

It was added to the National Register of Historic Places in 2004. The Tavern is owned and operated by the Northern York County Historical & Preservation Society and is open to the public as a living history museum. In 2024, a recreated version of the Eichelberger Distillery opened at Dill's Tavern and uses 18th century techniques to distill whiskey.
