= John Findlay (American politician) =

American politician

Member of the U.S. House of Representatives from Pennsylvania
- In office October 9, 1821 – March 3, 1827
- Preceded by: James Duncan
- Succeeded by: James Wilson; William Ramsey
- Constituency: 5th district (1821–1823); 11th district (1823–1827)

Personal details
- Born: March 31, 1766 Mercersburg, Province of Pennsylvania, British America
- Died: November 5, 1838 (aged 72) Chambersburg, Pennsylvania, U.S.
- Party: Democratic-Republican; Jacksonian Democrat; Jacksonian

John Findlay (March 31, 1766 – November 5, 1838) was an American politician and served two terms as a member of the U.S. House of Representatives from Pennsylvania's 5th congressional district.

== Early life ==
John Findlay was born in Mercersburg in the Province of Pennsylvania as the oldest son of Samuel Findlay and Jane (née Smith). His younger brothers were William Findlay and James Findlay. All three brothers became politicians, serving at national, state and local levels.

William served two terms as governor of Pennsylvania, and James served as mayor of Cincinnati before the War of 1812, and later as US Representative, from 1825 to 1833.

== Career ==
Findlay served as a prothonotary from 1809 to 1821. He served as a captain in the War of 1812. He moved to Chambersburg, Pennsylvania, where he served as a register and recorder of deeds, generally considered an advantageous appointment. He later was appointed as a clerk of the orphans' court and clerk of the court of quarter sessions, serving from 1809 to 1818.

Findlay joined the Republican Party. He won a special election to the Seventeenth Congress to fill the vacancy caused by the resignation of James Duncan. He was reelected as a Jackson Republican to the Eighteenth Congress and elected as a Jacksonian to the Nineteenth Congress.

== Later life and death ==
He was not a candidate for renomination in 1826. Appointed as US postmaster of Chambersburg on March 20, 1829, he served until his death there in 1838. He was buried in Falling Spring Presbyterian Church Cemetery at Chambersburg.

== Sources ==
- United States Congress. "John Findlay (id: F000120)". Biographical Directory of the United States Congress.
- The Political Graveyard

U.S. House of Representatives
Preceded by James Duncan	Member of the U.S. House of Representatives from Pennsylvania's 5th congressional district 1821–1823 alongside: James McSherry	Succeeded by Philip Swenk Markley
Preceded by George Plumer	Member of the U.S. House of Representatives from Pennsylvania's 11th congressional district 1823–1827 alongside: James Wilson	Succeeded by James Wilson; William Ramsey
