= Francis D. Collins =

American politician (1841–1891)

Francis Dolan Collins
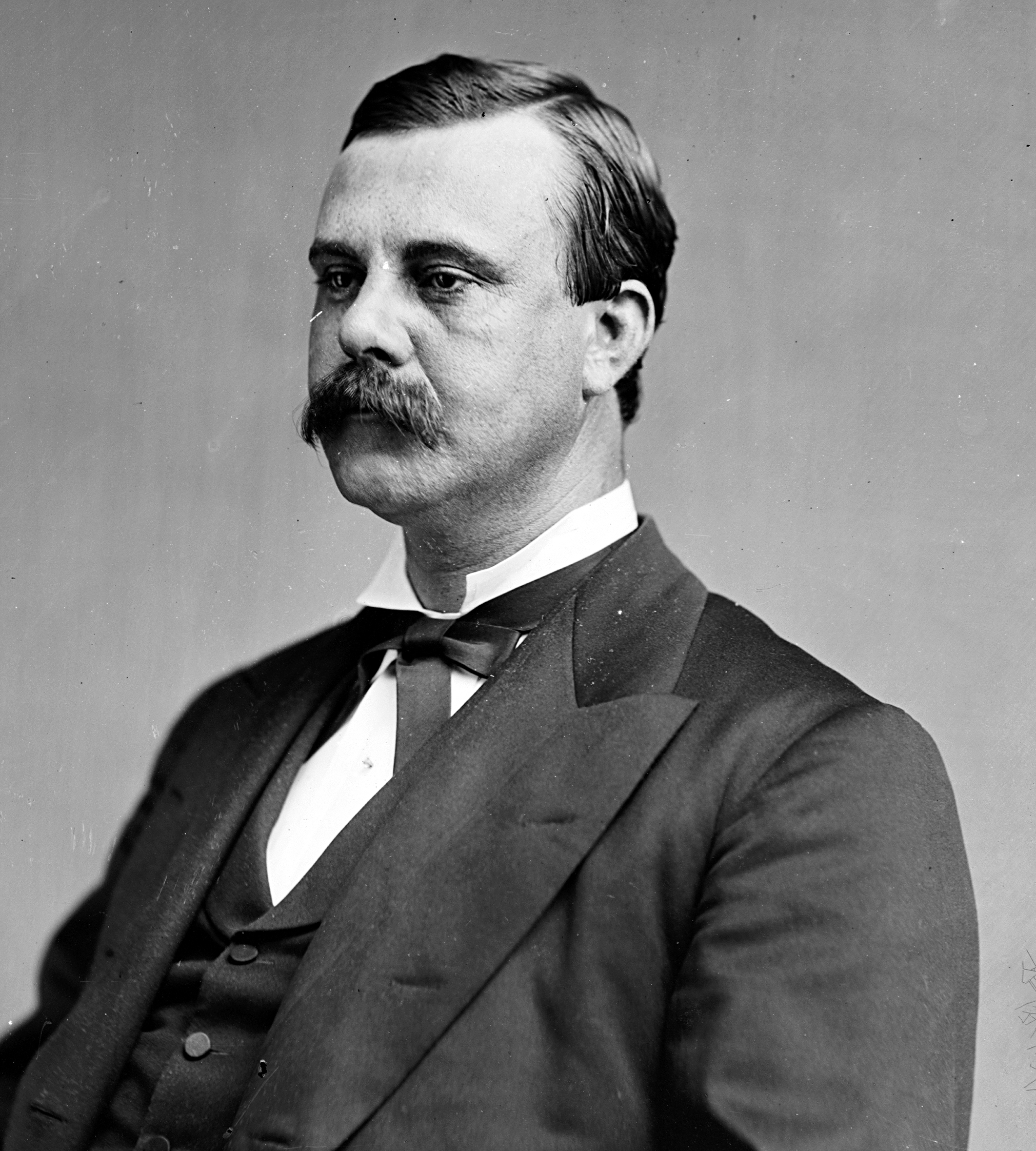

Member of the U.S. House of Representatives from Pennsylvania's 11th district
- In office March 4, 1875 – March 3, 1879
- Preceded by: John B. Storm
- Succeeded by: Robert Klotz

Member of the Pennsylvania Senate for the 13th district
- In office 1872-1874
- Preceded by: Albert Gallatin Brodhead
- Succeeded by: George H. Rowland

Personal details
- Born: March 5, 1841 Saugerties, New York, United States
- Died: November 21, 1891 (aged 50) Scranton, Pennsylvania, US
- Party: Democratic

Francis Dolan Collins (March 5, 1841 – November 21, 1891) was an American lawyer and politician who was a two-term Democratic member of the U.S. House of Representatives for Pennsylvania's 11th congressional district from 1875 to 1879.

== Early life and education ==
Francis Collins was born in Saugerties, New York, to Thomas and Catherine Collins. He attended St. Joseph's College, near Montrose, Pennsylvania, before moving with his parents to Dunmore, Pennsylvania. He attended Wyoming Seminary in Kingston, Pennsylvania.

He studied law, was admitted to the bar in 1866 and commenced practice in Scranton, Pennsylvania.

== Career ==
He was elected district attorney of the mayor's court district in 1869. He served in the Pennsylvania State Senate for the 13th district from 1872 to 1874.

Collins was elected as a Democrat to the Forty-fourth and Forty-fifth Congresses.

=== Later career and death ===
He resumed the practice of his profession and died in Scranton in 1891, aged 50.

U.S. House of Representatives
Preceded by John B. Storm	Member of the U.S. House of Representatives from Pennsylvania's 11th congressional district 1875–1879	Succeeded by Robert Klotz
Pennsylvania State Senate
Preceded by Albert Gallatin Brodhead	Member of the Pennsylvania Senate, 13th district 1872-1874	Succeeded by George H. Rowland
