= Benjamin A. Bidlack =

American politician

Member of the U.S. House of Representatives from Pennsylvania
- In office March 4, 1841 – March 3, 1845
- Preceded by: David Petrikin
- Succeeded by: Owen D. Leib
- Constituency: 15th district (1841–1843); 11th district (1843–1845)

Personal details
- Born: Benjamin Alden Bidlack; September 8, 1804 Paris, New York, U.S.
- Died: February 6, 1849 (aged 44) Bogotá, New Granada
- Party: Democratic

Benjamin Alden Bidlack (September 8, 1804 – February 6, 1849) was an American politician, diplomat, and attorney who served as a member of the US House of Representatives and was later appointed chargé d'affaires to New Granada. While serving in New Granada he negotiated an agreement later known as the Mallarino–Bidlack Treaty. This treaty was the only instance in the nineteenth century where the United States committed to defend the sovereignty of a Latin American state at the request of that state. The pact helped pave the way for the construction of the Panama Canal.

== Early life and education ==
Bidlack was born in Paris, New York, the son of Benjamin Bidlack, a pioneer farmer, and Lydia Alden Bidlack. When his family moved to Wilkes-Barre, Pennsylvania, he completed his education at local public schools . After graduation, he studied law in the office of a local attorney, Garrick Mallery.

== Career ==
Shortly after admittance to the state bar in 1825, Bidlack was appointed deputy attorney of Luzerne County, Pennsylvania. In 1829 he married Margaret Wallace. The couple had seven children. In 1830, he moved to Milford, Pennsylvania and entered the newspaper business. He began as publisher of the Republican Farmer. He later sold his interest in the paper and started the Northern Eagle, the first newspaper in Pike County, Pennsylvania. In 1834, he served as treasurer of Pike County.

Bidlack returned to Wilkes-Barre and was elected to the Pennsylvania House of Representatives in 1835-1836. In 1840 he was elected to the U.S. House of Representatives and re-elected in 1842. As a congressman, Bidlack became sympathetic to the case of Frances Slocum, a white woman who had been abducted as a child and raised by the Miami people. Slocum was fully assimilated into the Native American culture and was accepted as one of its members. In 1845, Congress passed a joint resolution originally introduced by Bidlack that exempted Slocum and twenty-one of her Miami relatives from removal to Kansas Territory.

After Bidlack lost his bid for reelection in 1844, President James Polk appointed him chargé d'affaires to New Granada on the recommendation of James Buchanan, the new secretary of state. Bidlack was instructed to gather information about crossing routes on the Isthmus of Panama and prevent other nations from securing transit rights from New Granada. However, both Bidlack and New Granada were concerned by the aggressive intentions of the French and British in the region, so Bidlack exceeded his instructions by negotiating a treaty giving the US transit rights on the isthmus in exchange for a US guarantee of New Granada's sovereignty and neutrality. His counterpart in the negotiations was New Granada's commissioner Manuel María Mallarino.

The treaty was the only instance in the nineteenth century where the United States committed to defend the sovereignty of a Latin American state at the request of that state. President Polk was surprised by Bidlack's actions and initially opposed the treaty because of the commitment to defend New Granada. He later threw his support behind the measure which received final ratification by Congress on 10 June 1848. Eventually, the pact helped pave the way for the construction of the Panama Canal.

He died in Bogotá, New Granada (today Colombia) on February 6, 1849, aged 44. He was interred in the English Cemetery.

== Sources ==
- Lach, Edward L. Jr. (2001). "Bidlack, Benjamin Alden (1804-1849)". American National Biography. Oxford University Press. doi:10.1093/anb/9780198606697.article.0300625.
- Findling, John E. (1980). "Bidlack, Benjamin Alden (1804-1849)". Dictionary of American Diplomatic History. Westport, Conn.: Greenwood Press. p. 56. ISBN 9780313220395.
- United States Congress. "Benjamin A. Bidlack (id: B000445)". Biographical Directory of the United States Congress.
- The Political Graveyard

U.S. House of Representatives
| Preceded by David Petrikin | Member of the U.S. House of Representatives from Pennsylvania's 15th congressional district 1841–1843 | Succeeded by Henry Nes |
| Preceded by James Gerry | Member of the U.S. House of Representatives from Pennsylvania's 11th congressional district 1843–1845 | Succeeded by Owen D. Leib |
Diplomatic posts
| Preceded by William M. Blackford | United States Chargé d'Affaires, New Granada; 5 December 1845 – 6 February 1849 | Succeeded by Thomas M. Foote |
