= Philip Johnson (Pennsylvania politician) =

American politician

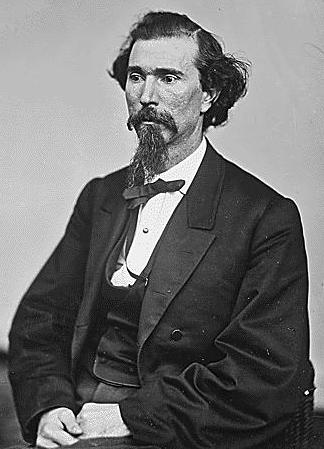

Member of the U.S. House of Representatives from Pennsylvania
- In office March 4, 1861 – January 29, 1867
- Preceded by: William H. Dimmick (13th); James H. Campbell (11th)
- Succeeded by: Henry W. Tracy (13th); Daniel M. Van Auken (11th)
- Constituency: 13th district (1861-63); 11th district (1863-67)

Member of the Pennsylvania House of Representatives
- In office 1853–1854

Personal details
- Born: Phillip Johnson; January 17, 1818 Knowlton Township, New Jersey, U.S.
- Died: January 29, 1867 (aged 49) Washington, D.C., U.S.
- Resting place: Easton Cemetery
- Party: Democratic

Philip Johnson (January 17, 1818 – January 29, 1867) was an American lawyer and politician who served three terms as a Democratic member of the U.S. House of Representatives from Pennsylvania from 1861 to 1867.

== Biography ==
Philip Johnson was born in Polkville in Knowlton Township, New Jersey. He moved to Upper Mount Bethel, Pennsylvania, in 1839. He attended the common schools and Lafayette College in Easton, Pennsylvania, from 1842 to 1844. He was a plantation tutor in Mississippi from 1844 to 1846. He returned to Pennsylvania, studied law, and attended Union Law School in Easton.

=== Early career ===
He was admitted to the bar in 1848 and commenced practice in Easton. He served as county court clerk from 1848 to 1853.

He was a member of the Pennsylvania House of Representatives in 1853 and 1854. He served as revenue commissioner of the third judicial district in 1859 and 1860. He was a delegate to the 1864 Democratic National Convention.

=== Congress ===
Johnson was elected as a Democrat to the Thirty-seventh, Thirty-eighth, and Thirty-ninth Congresses and until his death.

=== Death and burial ===
He died in Washington, D.C., on January 29, 1867, at the age of 49. His body was interred in Easton Cemetery.

== See also ==
- List of members of the United States Congress who died in office (1790–1899)

== Sources ==
- United States Congress. "Philip Johnson (id: J000168)". Biographical Directory of the United States Congress.
- Philip Johnson at The Political Graveyard

U.S. House of Representatives
| Preceded by William H. Dimmick | Member of the U.S. House of Representatives from Pennsylvania's 13th congressional district 1861–1863 | Succeeded by Henry W. Tracy |
| Preceded by James H. Campbell | Member of the U.S. House of Representatives from Pennsylvania's 11th congressional district 1863–1867 | Succeeded by Daniel M. Van Auken |
