= Dillsburg, Pennsylvania =

Borough in Pennsylvania, US

- Borough
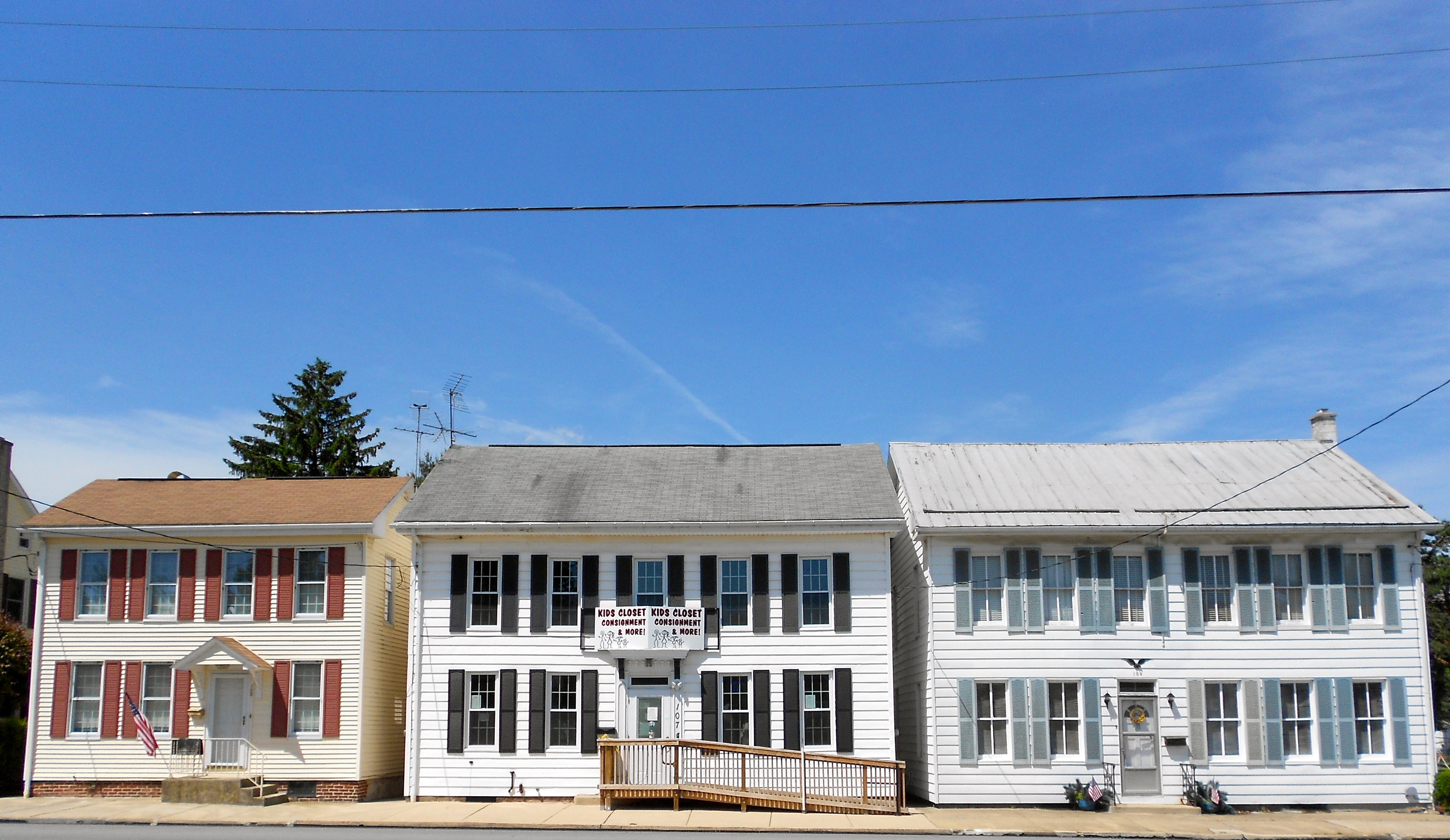
- Houses on Baltimore St.
- Motto: A small town with a big heart
- Location in York County and the U.S. state of Pennsylvania

- Location of Dillsburg in Pennsylvania Dillsburg (the United States)
- Coordinates: 40°06′41″N 77°02′09″W
- Country: United States
- State: Pennsylvania
- County: York
- Settled: 1740
- Incorporated: 1833

Government
  - Type: Borough Council
  - Mayor: John Richardson
  - Council President: Matt Fawber
  - Council Vice-President: Holly Kelley
  - Borough Manager: Karen Diebler

Area
  - Total: 0.81 sq mi (2.09 km^{2})
  - Land: 0.81 sq mi (2.09 km^{2})
  - Water: 0 sq mi (0.00 km^{2})
- Elevation: 659 ft (201 m)

Population (2020)
  - Total: 2,641
  - Density: 3,265.6/sq mi (1,260.84/km^{2})
- Time zone: UTC-5 (Eastern (EST))
  - Summer (DST): UTC-4 (EDT)
- Zip Code: 17019
- Area codes: 717 and 223
- FIPS code: 42-19208
- Website: Dillsburg

Dillsburg is a borough in York County, Pennsylvania, United States. The population was 2,641 as of the 2020 census. It is part of the York–Hanover metropolitan area.

== History ==
The town is named for Matthew Dill, an immigrant from County Monaghan, Ireland, who settled the town in 1740. The village became a center for local agriculture.

During the Civil War's Gettysburg campaign, Dillsburg was twice invaded by Confederate cavalry, first by Albert G. Jenkins's brigade, then by Maj. Gen. J.E.B. Stuart's division.

Dill's Tavern, founded in the 1750s with a current building constructed between 1794 and 1819, and the Rev. Anderson B. Quay House are listed on the National Register of Historic Places.

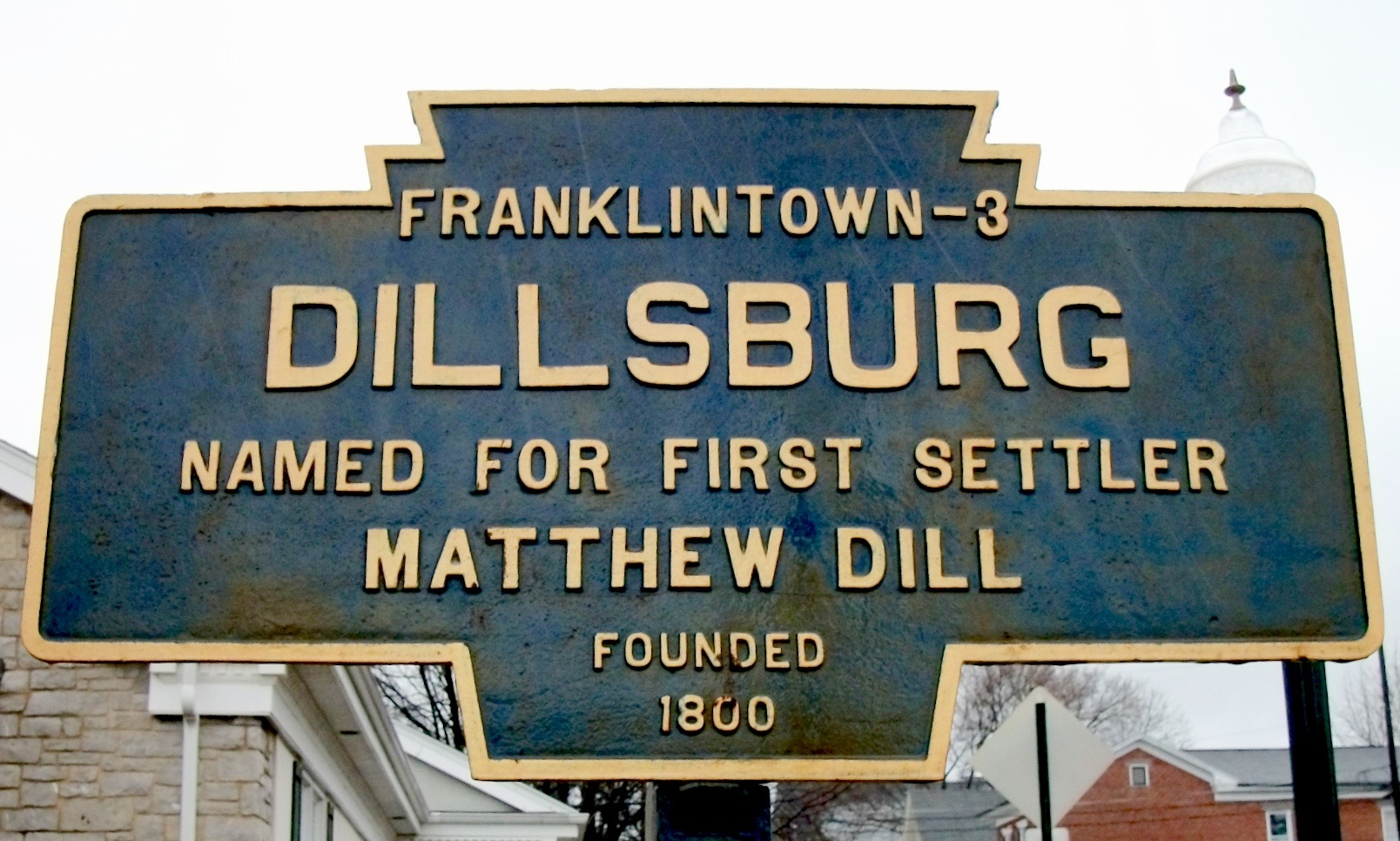
Keystone Marker

== Geography ==
Dillsburg is surrounded by Carroll Township in northwestern York County. According to the United States Census Bureau, the borough has a total area of 0.8 square miles (2.1 km^{2}), all land.

== Demographics ==
Historical population
Census	Pop.	Note	%±
1840	244		—
1850	270		10.7%
1860	306		13.3%
1870	281		−8.2%
1880	455		61.9%
1890	587		29.0%
1900	732		24.7%
1910	853		16.5%
1920	924		8.3%
1930	983		6.4%
1940	1,054		7.2%
1950	1,146		8.7%
1960	1,322		15.4%
1970	1,441		9.0%
1980	1,733		20.3%
1990	1,925		11.1%
2000	2,063		7.2%
2010	2,563		24.2%
2020	2,635		2.8%
2023 (est.)	2,634	▼	0.0%

As of the 2000 census, there were 2,063 people, 902 households, and 579 families living in the borough. The population density was 2,600.7 inhabitants per square mile (1,004.1/km^{2}). There were 936 housing units at an average density of 1,180.0 units per square mile (455.6 units/km^{2}). The racial makeup of the borough was 97.19% White, 0.48% African American, 0.44% Native American, 1.21% Asian, and 0.68% from two or more races. Hispanic or Latino people of any race were 0.29% of the population.

There were 902 households, out of which 30.3% had children under the age of 18 living with them, 50.1% were married couples living together, 10.8% had a female householder with no husband present, and 35.7% were non-families. 31.8% of all households were made up of individuals, and 14.7% had someone living alone who was 65 years of age or older. The average household size was 2.29 and the average family size was 2.89.

In the borough, the population was spread out, with 24.6% under the age of 18, 7.6% from 18 to 24, 31.2% from 25 to 44, 22.2% from 45 to 64, and 14.5% who were 65 years of age or older. The median age was 37 years. For every 100 females there were 87.2 males. For every 100 females age 18 and over, there were 81.2 males.

The median income for a household in the borough was $37,530, and the median income for a family was $46,797. Males had a median income of $42,235 versus $21,995 for females. The per capita income for the borough was $19,801. About 7.5% of families and 6.3% of the population were below the poverty line, including 9.6% of those under age 18 and 6.4% of those age 65 or over.

== Town festivals ==
Dillsburg's Farmers Fair celebration is held annually during the third weekend in October. Among the many attractions are the parades on Friday and Saturday evenings, the classic car and farm tractor parade Saturday afternoon, and Civil War reenactments at the nearby Dill's Tavern. A wide variety of food can be found, from common concessions to specialty theme items such as fried pickles and pickle soup.

Dillsburg drops a larger-than-life pickle on New Year's Eve in an event called the "Pickle Drop".

== District schools ==
- Northern York County School District
- Dillsburg Elementary School
- Northern Elementary School
- South Mountain Elementary School
- Wellsville Elementary School
- Northern Middle School
- Northern High School

== Notable people ==
- Brent Brockman (born 1988), professional soccer player
- David A. Day (1851–1897), Lutheran missionary
- Daniel J. Dill (1830–1917), Wisconsin state assemblyman
- Danny DiPrima (born 1991), professional soccer player
- Cody Eppley (born 1985), professional baseball player
- Dawn Keefer (born 1972), member of the Pennsylvania House of Representatives
- Chris Kilmore (born 1973), keyboardist for the rock band Incubus
- Henry Logan (1784–1866), member, U.S. House of Representatives
- Scott Perry (born 1962), U.S. representative from Pennsylvania, former Pennsylvania state representative
- Matthew Quay (1833–1904), U.S. senator from Pennsylvania
