= Pennsylvania's 11th congressional district =

U.S. House district for Pennsylvania

Coordinates: 40°52′53″N 76°27′06″W

- Interactive map of district boundaries since January 3, 2023 (Lancaster County outlined in red)
- Representative: Lloyd Smucker; R–West Lampeter Township
- Population (2025): 780,666
- Median household income: $89,722
- Ethnicity: 81.8% White; 9.2% Hispanic; 3.4% Black; 3.0% Two or more races; 2.1% Asian; 0.5% other
- Cook PVI: R+11

Pennsylvania's 11th congressional district is located in the southeast-central part of the state. It includes all of Lancaster County and portions of York County south and east of but not including the city of York. Republican Lloyd Smucker represents the district.

Prior to 2018, the 11th district was located in the east-central part of the state. The Supreme Court of Pennsylvania redrew the district in February 2018 after ruling the previous map unconstitutional, centering it around Pottsville and renumbering it as the ninth district. The new 11th district is essentially the successor to the old 16th District, with representation per the elections of 2018 onward. With the 2020 redistricting cycle, the Pennsylvania district's border between Hanover and York was adjusted to include less land north of Spring Grove and more to the southeast of York, effective with the 2022 elections.

Republican Lou Barletta represented the 11th district within its former boundaries from 2011 to 2019, the first Republican to do so in almost 30 years.

== Recent election results from statewide races ==
Year	Office	Results
2008	President	McCain 57% – 42%
2008	Attorney General	Corbett 70% – 30%
2008	Auditor General	Beiler 60% – 40%
2010	Senate	Toomey 69% – 31%
2010	Governor	Corbett 72% – 28%
2012	President	Romney 61% – 39%
2012	Senate	Smith 60% – 40%
2014	Governor	Corbett 60% – 40%
2016	President	Trump 60% – 35%
2016	Senate	Toomey 61% – 35%
2016	Attorney General	Rafferty Jr. 64% – 36%
2016	Auditor General	Brown 57% – 36%
2016	Treasurer	Voit III 59% – 34%
2018	Senate	Barletta 56% – 42%
2018	Governor	Wagner 53% – 45%
2020	President	Trump 60% – 39%
2020	Attorney General	Heidelbaugh 60% – 37%
2020	Auditor General	DeFoor 61% – 34%
2020	Treasurer	Garrity 62% – 35%
2022	Senate	Oz 58% – 40%
2022	Governor	Mastriano 52% – 46%
2024	President	Trump 60% – 39%
2024	Senate	McCormick 59% – 39%
2024	Attorney General	Sunday 61% – 36%
2024	Auditor General	DeFoor 62% – 35%
2024	Treasurer	Garrity 63% – 35%

== District boundaries 2003–2019 ==
From 2003 to 2013 the district included Scranton, Wilkes-Barre, Hazleton and most of the Poconos. With a strong base in areas of industry and ethnic groups, it was once considered a very safe Democratic seat but has become more competitive in recent years. Former longtime Democratic incumbent Paul Kanjorski faced his closest contest ever in 2008, narrowly defeating Lou Barletta, the Republican mayor of Hazleton, 138,849 to 129,358. In 2010, Kanjorski was unseated by Barletta in a 45%–55% vote.

The district was substantially redrawn by the state legislature in the course of the 2012 redistricting after the 2010 census, significantly altering the 11th. It lost Scranton and Wilkes-Barre to the 17th district. To make up for the loss in population, the 11th was pushed into more rural and Republican-leaning territory to the north and south. It then stretched from the Poconos all the way to the suburbs of Harrisburg.

The district includes the most Amish communities of any congressional district in the United States. The current representative, Lloyd Smucker, belonged to the Old Order Amish at the time of his birth, but his family left the community when he was five years old.

== Current counties and municipalities ==
Lancaster County (60)

All 60 municipalities

York County (45)

Chanceford Township, Codorus Township, Cross Roads, Dallastown, Delta, East Hopewell Township, East Prospect, Fawn Grove, Fawn Township, Glen Rock, Hallam, Hanover, Heidelberg Township, Hellam Township, Hopewell Township, Jackson Township (part; also 10th), Jacobus, Jefferson, Loganville, Lower Chanceford Township, Lower Windsor Township, Manheim Township, New Freedom, New Salem, North Codorus Township, North Hopewell Township, Paradise Township, Peach Bottom Township, Penn Township, Railroad, Red Lion, Seven Valleys, Shrewsbury Borough, Shrewsbury Township, Springfield Township, Spring Grove, Stewartstown, West Manheim Township, Windsor Borough, Windsor Township, Winterstown, Wrightsville, Yoe, Yorkana, York Township

== List of members representing the district ==
=== 1795–1823: one seat ===
District created in 1795.

Representative	Party	Years	Congress	Electoral history
	District established March 4, 1795			
William Findley (Youngstown)	Democratic-Republican	March 4, 1795 – March 3, 1799	4th 5th	Redistricted from the at-large district and re-elected in 1794. Re-elected in 1796. Retired.
John Smilie (Fayette County)	Democratic-Republican	March 4, 1799 – March 3, 1803	6th 7th	Elected in 1798. Re-elected in 1800. Redistricted to the 9th district.
John B. C. Lucas (Pittsburgh)	Democratic-Republican	March 4, 1803 – ??, 1805	8th 9th	Elected in 1802. Re-elected in 1804. Resigned before Congress began to become U.S. District Judge.
	Vacant	??, 1805 – December 2, 1805	9th	
Samuel Smith (Erie)	Democratic-Republican	December 2, 1805 – March 3, 1811	9th 10th 11th	Elected October 8, 1805, to finish Lucas's term and seated December 2, 1805. Re-elected in 1806. Re-elected in 1808. Lost re-election.
Abner Lacock (Beavertown)	Democratic-Republican	March 4, 1811 – March 3, 1813	12th	Elected in 1810. Redistricted to the 15th district and re-elected in 1812 but resigned before term started because he was elected U.S. Senator.
William Findley (Youngstown)	Democratic-Republican	March 4, 1813 – March 3, 1817	13th 14th	Redistricted from the 8th district and Re-elected in 1812. Re-elected in 1814. Retired.
David Marchand (Greensburg)	Democratic-Republican	March 4, 1817 – March 3, 1821	15th 16th	Elected in 1816. Re-elected in 1818. Retired.
George Plumer (Robbstown)	Democratic-Republican	March 4, 1821 – March 3, 1823	17th	Elected in 1820. Redistricted to the 17th district.

=== 1823–1833: two seats ===
Cong ress	Years	Seat A			Seat B		
Cong ress	Years	Representative	Party	Electoral history	Representative	Party	Electoral history
18th	March 4, 1823 – March 3, 1825	James Wilson (Fairfield)	Democratic-Republican	Elected in 1822. Re-elected in 1824. Re-elected in 1826. Lost re-election.	John Findlay (Chambersburg)	Democratic-Republican	Redistricted from the 5th district and re-elected in 1822. Re-elected in 1824. Retired.
19th	March 4, 1825 – March 3, 1827	James Wilson (Fairfield)	Jacksonian	Elected in 1822. Re-elected in 1824. Re-elected in 1826. Lost re-election.	John Findlay (Chambersburg)	Jacksonian	Redistricted from the 5th district and re-elected in 1822. Re-elected in 1824. Retired.
20th	March 4, 1827 – March 3, 1829	James Wilson (Fairfield)	Jacksonian	Elected in 1822. Re-elected in 1824. Re-elected in 1826. Lost re-election.	William Ramsey (Carlisle)	Jacksonian	Elected in 1826. Re-elected in 1828. Re-elected in 1830. Died.
21st	March 4, 1829 – March 3, 1831	Thomas H. Crawford (Chambersburg)	Jacksonian	Elected in 1828. Re-elected in 1830. Redistricted to the 12th district and lost re-election.	William Ramsey (Carlisle)	Jacksonian	Elected in 1826. Re-elected in 1828. Re-elected in 1830. Died.
22nd	March 4, 1831 – September 29, 1831	Thomas H. Crawford (Chambersburg)	Jacksonian	Elected in 1828. Re-elected in 1830. Redistricted to the 12th district and lost re-election.	William Ramsey (Carlisle)	Jacksonian	Elected in 1826. Re-elected in 1828. Re-elected in 1830. Died.
22nd	September 29, 1831 – November 22, 1831	Thomas H. Crawford (Chambersburg)	Jacksonian	Elected in 1828. Re-elected in 1830. Redistricted to the 12th district and lost re-election.	Vacant		
22nd	November 22, 1831 – March 3, 1833	Thomas H. Crawford (Chambersburg)	Jacksonian	Elected in 1828. Re-elected in 1830. Redistricted to the 12th district and lost re-election.	Robert McCoy (Carlisle)	Jacksonian	Elected to finish Ransey's term. [data missing]

=== 1833–present: one seat ===
Member	Party	Years	Cong ress	Electoral history	Location
Charles A. Barnitz (York)	Anti-Masonic	March 4, 1833 – March 3, 1835	23rd	Elected in 1832. Lost re-election.	1833–1843
Henry Logan (Dillsburg)	Jacksonian	March 4, 1835 – March 3, 1837	24th 25th	Elected in 1834. Re-elected in 1836. Retired.	1833–1843
Henry Logan (Dillsburg)	Democratic	March 4, 1837 – March 3, 1839	24th 25th	Elected in 1834. Re-elected in 1836. Retired.	1833–1843
James Gerry (Shrewsbury)	Democratic	March 4, 1839 – March 3, 1843	26th 27th	Elected in 1838. Re-elected in 1840. Retired.	1833–1843
Benjamin A. Bidlack (Wilkes-Barre)	Democratic	March 4, 1843 – March 3, 1845	28th	Redistricted from the 15th district and re-elected in 1843. [data missing]	1843–1853
Owen D. Leib (Catawissa)	Democratic	March 4, 1845 – March 3, 1847	29th	Elected in 1844. Lost re-election.	1843–1853
Chester P. Butler (Wilkes-Barre)	Whig	March 4, 1847 – October 5, 1850	30th 31st	Elected in 1846. Re-elected in 1848. Died.	1843–1853
Vacant		October 5, 1850 – January 13, 1851	31st		1843–1853
John Brisbin (Wilkes-Barre)	Democratic	January 13, 1851 – March 3, 1851	31st	Elected to finish Butler's term. Retired.	1843–1853
Henry M. Fuller (Wilkes-Barre)	Whig	March 4, 1851 – March 3, 1853	32nd	Elected in 1850. Lost renomination.	1843–1853
Christian M. Straub (Pottsville)	Democratic	March 4, 1853 – March 3, 1855	33rd	Elected in 1852. Retired.	1853–1863
James H. Campbell (Pottsville)	Opposition	March 4, 1855 – March 3, 1857	34th	Elected in 1854. Lost re-election.	1853–1863
William L. Dewart (Sunbury)	Democratic	March 4, 1857 – March 3, 1859	35th	Elected in 1856. Lost re-election.	1853–1863
James H. Campbell (Pottsville)	Republican	March 4, 1859 – March 3, 1863	36th 37th	Elected in 1858. Re-elected in 1860. Retired.	1853–1863
Philip Johnson (Easton)	Democratic	March 4, 1863 – January 29, 1867	38th 39th	Redistricted from the 13th district and re-elected in 1862. Re-elected in 1864. Re-elected in 1866 but died before the next term began. Died.	1853–1863
Philip Johnson (Easton)	Democratic	March 4, 1863 – January 29, 1867	38th 39th	Redistricted from the 13th district and re-elected in 1862. Re-elected in 1864. Re-elected in 1866 but died before the next term began. Died.	1863–1873
Vacant		January 29, 1867 – March 3, 1867	39th		1863–1873
Daniel M. Van Auken (Milford)	Democratic	March 4, 1867 – March 3, 1871	40th 41st	Elected in 1867 to finish Johnson's term. Re-elected in 1868. Retired.	1863–1873
John B. Storm (Stroudsburg)	Democratic	March 4, 1871 – March 3, 1875	42nd 43rd	Elected in 1870. Re-elected in 1872; Retired.	1863–1873
John B. Storm (Stroudsburg)	Democratic	March 4, 1871 – March 3, 1875	42nd 43rd	Elected in 1870. Re-elected in 1872; Retired.	1873–1893
Francis D. Collins (Scranton)	Democratic	March 4, 1875 – March 3, 1879	44th 45th	Elected in 1874. Re-elected in 1876. [data missing]	1873–1893
Robert Klotz (Mauch Chunk)	Democratic	March 4, 1879 – March 3, 1883	46th 47th	Elected in 1878; Re-elected in 1880. [data missing]	1873–1893
John B. Storm (Stroudsburg)	Democratic	March 4, 1883 – March 3, 1887	48th 49th	Elected in 1882. Re-elected in 1884. Retired.	1873–1893
Charles R. Buckalew (Bloomsburg)	Democratic	March 4, 1887 – March 3, 1889	50th	Elected in 1886. Redistricted to the 17th district.	1873–1893
Joseph A. Scranton (Scranton)	Republican	March 4, 1889 – March 3, 1891	51st	Elected in 1888. Lost re-election.	1873–1893
Lemuel Amerman (Scranton)	Democratic	March 4, 1891 – March 3, 1893	52nd	Elected in 1890. Lost re-election.	1873–1893
Joseph A. Scranton (Scranton)	Republican	March 4, 1893 – March 3, 1897	53rd 54th	Elected in 1892. Elected in 1894. Retired.	1893–1903
William Connell (Scranton)	Republican	March 4, 1897 – March 3, 1903	55th 56th 57th	Elected in 1896. Re-elected in 1898. Re-elected in 1900. Redistricted to the 10th district.	1893–1903
Henry W. Palmer (Wilkes-Barre)	Republican	March 4, 1903 – March 3, 1907	58th 59th	Redistricted from the 12th district and re-elected in 1902. Re-elected in 1904. [data missing]	1903–1913
John T. Lenahan (Wilkes-Barre)	Democratic	March 4, 1907 – March 3, 1909	60th	Elected in 1906. Retired.	1903–1913
Henry W. Palmer (Wilkes-Barre)	Republican	March 4, 1909 – March 3, 1911	61st	Elected in 1908. [data missing]	1903–1913
Charles C. Bowman (Pittston)	Republican	March 4, 1911 – December 12, 1912	62nd	Elected in 1910. Election contested and seat declared vacant. Lost re-election.	1903–1913
Vacant		December 12, 1912 – March 3, 1913	62nd		1903–1913
John J. Casey (Wilkes-Barre)	Democratic	March 4, 1913 – March 3, 1917	63rd 64th	Elected in 1912. Re-elected in 1914. Lost re-election.	1913–1933
Thomas W. Templeton (Plymouth)	Republican	March 4, 1917 – March 3, 1919	65th	Elected in 1916. Retired.	1913–1933
John J. Casey (Wilkes-Barre)	Democratic	March 4, 1919 – March 3, 1921	66th	Elected in 1918. Lost re-election.	1913–1933
Clarence D. Coughlin (Wilkes-Barre)	Republican	March 3, 1921 – March 3, 1923	67th	Elected in 1920. Lost re-election.	1913–1933
Laurence H. Watres (Scranton)	Republican	March 4, 1923 – March 3, 1931	68th 69th 70th 71st	Elected in 1922. Re-elected in 1924. Re-elected in 1926. Re-elected in 1928. Retired.	1913–1933
Patrick J. Boland (Scranton)	Democratic	March 4, 1931 – May 18, 1942	72nd 73rd 74th 75th 76th 77th	Elected in 1930. Re-elected in 1932. Re-elected in 1934. Re-elected in 1936. Re-elected in 1938. Re-elected in 1940. Died.	1913–1933
Patrick J. Boland (Scranton)	Democratic	March 4, 1931 – May 18, 1942	72nd 73rd 74th 75th 76th 77th	Elected in 1930. Re-elected in 1932. Re-elected in 1934. Re-elected in 1936. Re-elected in 1938. Re-elected in 1940. Died.	1933–1943 s[data missing]
Vacant		May 18, 1942 – November 3, 1942	77th		1933–1943 s[data missing]
Veronica Grace Boland (Scranton)	Democratic	November 3, 1942 – January 3, 1943	77th	Elected to finish her husband's term. (Note: See Widow's succession.); Retired.	1933–1943 s[data missing]
John W. Murphy (Dunmore)	Democratic	January 3, 1943 – January 3, 1945	78th	Elected in 1942. Redistricted to the 10th district.	1943–1953
Daniel Flood (Wilkes-Barre)	Democratic	January 3, 1945 – January 3, 1947	79th	Elected in 1944. Lost re-election.	1943–1953
Mitchell Jenkins (Trucksville)	Republican	January 3, 1947 – January 3, 1949	80th	Elected in 1946. Retired.	1943–1953
Daniel Flood (Wilkes-Barre)	Democratic	January 3, 1949 – January 3, 1953	81st 82nd	Elected in 1948. Re-elected in 1950. Lost re-election.	
Edward Bonin (Hazleton)	Republican	January 3, 1953 – January 3, 1955	83rd	Elected in 1952. Lost re-election.	1953–1963
Daniel Flood (Wilkes-Barre)	Democratic	January 3, 1955 – January 31, 1980	84th 85th 86th 87th 88th 89th 90th 91st 92nd 93rd 94th 95th 96th	Elected in 1954. Re-elected in 1956. Re-elected in 1958. Re-elected in 1960. Re-elected in 1962. Re-elected in 1964. Re-elected in 1966. Re-elected in 1968. Re-elected in 1970. Re-elected in 1972. Re-elected in 1974. Re-elected in 1976. Re-elected in 1978. Resigned due to allegations of bribery.	1953–1963
Daniel Flood (Wilkes-Barre)	Democratic	January 3, 1955 – January 31, 1980	84th 85th 86th 87th 88th 89th 90th 91st 92nd 93rd 94th 95th 96th	Elected in 1954. Re-elected in 1956. Re-elected in 1958. Re-elected in 1960. Re-elected in 1962. Re-elected in 1964. Re-elected in 1966. Re-elected in 1968. Re-elected in 1970. Re-elected in 1972. Re-elected in 1974. Re-elected in 1976. Re-elected in 1978. Resigned due to allegations of bribery.	1963–1973
Daniel Flood (Wilkes-Barre)	Democratic	January 3, 1955 – January 31, 1980	84th 85th 86th 87th 88th 89th 90th 91st 92nd 93rd 94th 95th 96th	Elected in 1954. Re-elected in 1956. Re-elected in 1958. Re-elected in 1960. Re-elected in 1962. Re-elected in 1964. Re-elected in 1966. Re-elected in 1968. Re-elected in 1970. Re-elected in 1972. Re-elected in 1974. Re-elected in 1976. Re-elected in 1978. Resigned due to allegations of bribery.	1973–1983
Vacant		January 31, 1980 – April 9, 1980	96th		1973–1983
Ray Musto (Pittston)	Democratic	April 9, 1980 – January 3, 1981	96th	Elected to finish Flood's term. Lost re-election.	1973–1983
James Nelligan (Forty Fort)	Republican	January 3, 1981 – January 3, 1983	97th	Elected in 1980. Lost re-election.	1973–1983
Frank Harrison (Wilkes-Barre)	Democratic	January 3, 1983 – January 3, 1985	98th	Elected in 1982; Lost renomination.	1983–1993
Paul Kanjorski (Nanticoke)	Democratic	January 3, 1985 – January 3, 2011	99th 100th 101st 102nd 103rd 104th 105th 106th 107th 108th 109th 110th 111th	Elected in 1984. Re-elected in 1986. Re-elected in 1988. Re-elected in 1990. Re-elected in 1992. Re-elected in 1994. Re-elected in 1996. Re-elected in 1998. Re-elected in 2000. Re-elected in 2002. Re-elected in 2004. Re-elected in 2006. Re-elected in 2008. Lost re-election.	1983–1993
Paul Kanjorski (Nanticoke)	Democratic	January 3, 1985 – January 3, 2011	99th 100th 101st 102nd 103rd 104th 105th 106th 107th 108th 109th 110th 111th	Elected in 1984. Re-elected in 1986. Re-elected in 1988. Re-elected in 1990. Re-elected in 1992. Re-elected in 1994. Re-elected in 1996. Re-elected in 1998. Re-elected in 2000. Re-elected in 2002. Re-elected in 2004. Re-elected in 2006. Re-elected in 2008. Lost re-election.	1993–2003
Paul Kanjorski (Nanticoke)	Democratic	January 3, 1985 – January 3, 2011	99th 100th 101st 102nd 103rd 104th 105th 106th 107th 108th 109th 110th 111th	Elected in 1984. Re-elected in 1986. Re-elected in 1988. Re-elected in 1990. Re-elected in 1992. Re-elected in 1994. Re-elected in 1996. Re-elected in 1998. Re-elected in 2000. Re-elected in 2002. Re-elected in 2004. Re-elected in 2006. Re-elected in 2008. Lost re-election.	2003–2013
Lou Barletta (Hazleton)	Republican	January 3, 2011 – January 3, 2019	112th 113th 114th 115th	Elected in 2010. Re-elected in 2012. Re-elected in 2014. Re-elected in 2016. Redistricted to the 9th district and retired to run for U.S. Senator.	2003–2013
Lou Barletta (Hazleton)	Republican	January 3, 2011 – January 3, 2019	112th 113th 114th 115th	Elected in 2010. Re-elected in 2012. Re-elected in 2014. Re-elected in 2016. Redistricted to the 9th district and retired to run for U.S. Senator.	2013–2019
Lloyd Smucker (West Lampeter Township)	Republican	January 3, 2019 – present	116th 117th 118th 119th	Redistricted from the 16th district and re-elected in 2018. Re-elected in 2020. Re-elected in 2022. Re-elected in 2024. Re-elected in 2026.	2019–2023
Lloyd Smucker (West Lampeter Township)	Republican	January 3, 2019 – present	116th 117th 118th 119th	Redistricted from the 16th district and re-elected in 2018. Re-elected in 2020. Re-elected in 2022. Re-elected in 2024. Re-elected in 2026.	2023–present

== Recent election results ==
=== 2012 ===
Pennsylvania's 11th congressional district, 2012
Party	Candidate	Votes	%
Republican	Lou Barletta (incumbent)	166,967	58.5
Democratic	Gene Stilp	118,231	41.5
Total votes		285,198	100.0
Republican hold			

=== 2014 ===
Pennsylvania's 11th congressional district, 2014
Party	Candidate	Votes	%
Republican	Lou Barletta (incumbent)	122,464	66.3
Democratic	Andrew Ostrowski	62,228	33.7
Total votes		184,692	100.0
Republican hold			

=== 2016 ===
Pennsylvania's 11th congressional district, 2016
Party	Candidate	Votes	%
Republican	Lou Barletta (incumbent)	199,421	63.7
Democratic	Michael Marsicano	113,800	36.3
Total votes		313,221	100.0
Republican hold			

=== 2018 ===
Pennsylvania's 11th congressional district, 2018
Party	Candidate	Votes	%
Republican	Lloyd Smucker (incumbent)	163,708	59.0
Democratic	Jess King	113,876	41.0
Total votes		277,584	100.0
Republican hold			

=== 2020 ===
Pennsylvania's 11th congressional district, 2020
Party	Candidate	Votes	%
Republican	Lloyd Smucker (incumbent)	241,915	63.1
Democratic	Sarah Hammond	141,325	36.9
Total votes		383,240	100.0
Republican hold			

=== 2022 ===
Pennsylvania's 11th congressional district, 2022
Party	Candidate	Votes	%
Republican	Lloyd Smucker (incumbent)	194,991	61.5
Democratic	Bob Hollister	121,835	38.5
Total votes		316,826	100.0
Republican hold			

=== 2024 ===
Pennsylvania's 11th congressional district, 2024
Party	Candidate	Votes	%
Republican	Lloyd Smucker (incumbent)	253,672	62.9
Democratic	Jim Atkinson	149,641	37.1
Total votes		403,313	100.0
Republican hold			

== See also ==
- List of United States congressional districts
- Pennsylvania's congressional districts
