= Thomas Hartley Crawford =

American politician

Judge on the Criminal Court of the District of Columbia
- In office 1845–1866
- Appointed by: James K. Polk

3rd Commissioner of Indian Affairs
- In office October 22, 1838 – October 30, 1845
- President: Martin Van Buren; William Henry Harrison; John Tyler; James K. Polk
- Preceded by: Carey A. Harris
- Succeeded by: William Medill

Member of the U.S. House of Representatives from Pennsylvania's 11th district
- In office March 4, 1829 – March 3, 1833 Serving with William Ramsey
- Preceded by: James Wilson
- Succeeded by: Charles Augustus Barnitz

Member of the Pennsylvania House of Representatives
- In office 1833-1834

Personal details
- Born: November 14, 1786 Chambersburg, Pennsylvania
- Died: January 27, 1863 (aged 76)
- Party: Jacksonian

Thomas Hartley Crawford (November 14, 1786 – January 27, 1863) was a Jacksonian member of the U.S. House of Representatives from Pennsylvania.

Thomas H. Crawford was born in Chambersburg, Pennsylvania. He graduated from Princeton College in 1804. He studied law, was admitted to the bar in 1807 and commenced practice in Chambersburg.

Crawford was elected as a Jacksonian to the Twenty-first and Twenty-second Congresses. He was a member of the Pennsylvania House of Representatives in 1833 and 1834. He was appointed a commissioner to investigate alleged frauds in the sale of the Creek Reservation in 1836. He was appointed by President Martin Van Buren as commissioner of Indian Affairs and served from October 22, 1838, to October 30, 1845. He was appointed by President James K. Polk as judge of the criminal court of the District of Columbia in 1845 and served until 1861, when the court was reorganized. He died in Washington, D.C., in 1863. He had his interment in the Congressional Cemetery.

== Sources ==
- United States Congress. "Thomas Hartley Crawford (id: C000893)". Biographical Directory of the United States Congress.
- The Political Graveyard

U.S. House of Representatives
Preceded by James Wilson; William Ramsey	Member of the U.S. House of Representatives from Pennsylvania's 11th congressional district 1829–1833; 1829–1831 alongside: William Ramsey; 1831–1833 alongside: Robert McCoy	Succeeded by Charles Augustus Barnitz
