= John Klingensmith Jr. =

American politician

Member of the U.S. House of Representatives from Pennsylvania's 19th district
- In office March 4, 1835 – March 3, 1839
- Preceded by: Richard Coulter
- Succeeded by: Albert G. Marchand

Member of the Pennsylvania State Senate for the 18th district
- In office 1831–1834
- Preceded by: Jacob M. Wise
- Succeeded by: Samuel Leas Carpenter

Personal details
- Born: March 26, 1786 Westmoreland County, Pennsylvania, U.S.
- Died: February 8, 1854 (aged 67) Westmoreland County, Pennsylvania, U.S.
- Party: Jacksonian; Democratic

John Klingensmith Jr. (March 26, 1786 – February 8, 1854) was an American politician from Pennsylvania who served as a Jacksonian member of the U.S. House of Representatives for Pennsylvania's 19th congressional district from 1835 to 1839.

== Biography ==
John Klingensmith Jr. was born in Westmoreland County, Pennsylvania to John J. Sr. and Anna Elizabeth (Kauffer) Klingensmith. He was sheriff of Westmoreland County from 1819 to 1822 and again from 1828 to 1831.

=== Career ===
Klingensmith was elected as a Jacksonian to the Twenty-fourth Congress and reelected as a Democrat to the Twenty-fifth Congress.

He was a member of the Pennsylvania State Senate for the 18th district from 1831 to 1835 and served as secretary of the land office of Pennsylvania from 1839 to 1842.

Klingensmith was co-owner of The Greensburg Democrat newspaper from 1853 to 1854.

=== Death ===
He died in 1854 in Westmoreland County.

== Sources ==
- United States Congress. "John Klingensmith Jr. (id: K000269)". Biographical Directory of the United States Congress.
- The Political Graveyard

Pennsylvania State Senate
Preceded by Jacob M. Wise	Member of the Pennsylvania Senate, 18th district 1831-1834	Succeeded by Samuel Leas Carpenter
U.S. House of Representatives
Preceded by Richard Coulter	Member of the U.S. House of Representatives from Pennsylvania's 19th congressional district 1835–1839	Succeeded by Albert G. Marchand
