= George Plumer =

American politician

George Plumer (December 5, 1762 – June 8, 1843) was a member of the U.S. House of Representatives from Pennsylvania.

George Plumer was born near Pittsburgh, Pennsylvania. He was a member of the Pennsylvania House of Representatives from 1812 to 1815 and again in 1817.

Plumer was elected as a Republican to the Seventeenth Congress, elected as a Jackson Republican to the Eighteenth Congress, and reelected as a Jacksonian to the Nineteenth Congress. He declined to be a candidate for renomination and engaged in agricultural pursuits. He died near West Newton, Pennsylvania, in 1843. Interment in Old Sewickley Presbyterian Church Cemetery.

== Sources ==
- United States Congress. "George Plumer (id: P000392)". Biographical Directory of the United States Congress.
- The Political Graveyard

U.S. House of Representatives
Preceded by David Marchand	Member of the U.S. House of Representatives from Pennsylvania's 11th congressional district 1821–1823	Succeeded by John Findlay; James Wilson
Preceded by District Created	Member of the U.S. House of Representatives from Pennsylvania's 17th congressional district 1823–1827	Succeeded by Richard Coulter
