= William Ramsey (Pennsylvania politician) =

American politician

William Ramsey (September 7, 1779 – September 29, 1831) was a member of the U.S. House of Representatives from Pennsylvania.

William Ramsey born at Sterretts Gap, Pennsylvania. He was appointed surveyor for Cumberland County, Pennsylvania, in 1803, and served as clerk of the orphans’ court of Cumberland County. He studied law, was admitted to the bar and commenced practice in Carlisle, Pennsylvania.

Ramsey was elected to the Twentieth Congress; reelected as a Jacksonian to the Twenty-first and Twenty-second Congresses and served until his death in Carlisle. Interment in Ashland Cemetery.

== See also ==
- List of members of the United States Congress who died in office (1790–1899)

== Sources ==
- United States Congress. "William Ramsey (id: R000029)". Biographical Directory of the United States Congress.
- The Political Graveyard

U.S. House of Representatives
Preceded by James Wilson; John Findlay	Member of the U.S. House of Representatives from Pennsylvania's 11th congressional district 1827–1831; 1827–1829 alongside:James Wilson; 1829–1831 alongside: Thomas Hartley Crawford	Succeeded by Thomas Hartley Crawford; Robert McCoy
