= Robert McCoy (politician) =

American politician

Robert McCoy (died June 7, 1849) was a member of the U.S. House of Representatives from Pennsylvania.

Robert McCoy born in Carlisle, Pennsylvania (birth date unknown). He served as prothonotary of Cumberland County, Pennsylvania. He was a Brigadier General of the militia and a state canal commissioner.

McCoy was elected as a Jacksonian to the Twenty-second Congress to fill the vacancy caused by the death of United States Representative William Ramsey. He died in Wheeling, Virginia (now West Virginia) in 1849.

== Sources ==
- United States Congress. "Robert McCoy (id: M000375)". Biographical Directory of the United States Congress.
- The Political Graveyard

U.S. House of Representatives
Preceded by Thomas Hartley Crawford; William Ramsey	Member of the U.S. House of Representatives from Pennsylvania's 11th congressional district November 22, 1831 – March 3, 1833 alongside: Thomas Hartley Crawford	Succeeded by Charles Augustus Barnitz
