= David Marchand =

American politician

Member of the U.S. House of Representatives from Pennsylvania's 11th congressional district
- In office March 4, 1817 – March 4, 1821
- Preceded by: William Findley
- Succeeded by: George Plumer

Personal details
- Born: December 10, 1776 Irwin, Pennsylvania
- Died: March 11, 1832 (aged 55) Greensburg, Pennsylvania
- Party: Democratic-Republican
- Children: Albert Gallatin Marchand

David Marchand was a member of the U.S. House of Representatives from Pennsylvania. He was born near Irwin, Pennsylvania. He studied medicine and practiced in Westmoreland County, Pennsylvania. He was a major general of the Thirteenth Division of the State militia from 1812 to 1814. He had a son, Albert Gallatin Marchand.

Marchand was elected as a Democratic-Republican to the Fifteenth Congress and reelected to the Sixteenth Congress. He was elected prothonotary of Westmoreland County in 1821. He resumed the practice of medicine and died in Greensburg, Pennsylvania, in 1832. Interment in Greensburg Cemetery.

== Sources ==
- United States Congress. "David Marchand (id: M000124)". Biographical Directory of the United States Congress.
- The Political Graveyard

U.S. House of Representatives
| Preceded by William Findley | Member of the U.S. House of Representatives from Pennsylvania's 11th congressional district 1817–1821 | Succeeded by George Plumer |
