= Orr (surname) =

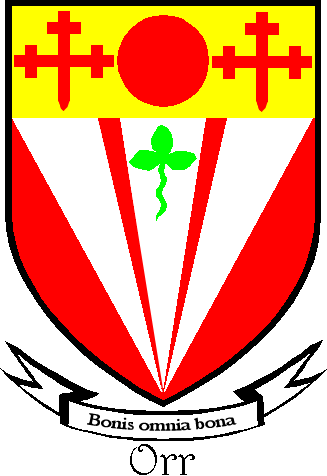
- Orr coat of arms

Origin
- Language: Scottish Gaelic
- Region of origin: Scotland (Argyll, Renfrew, etc.)

Orr is a surname of Scottish and Ulster-Scots origin. It is derived from the Gaelic Odhar meaning "dark, pale". In Scotland, Orr may be a sept of Clan Campbell.

== Etymology ==
The primary origin is from the Gaelic odhar, meaning "dark", "dun". Padraig Mac Giolla Domhnaigh, suggested that the Irish surname originates from an Anglicisation of Gaelic Mac Iomhaire. Mac Giolla Domhnaigh stated that this was an old name from Renfrewshire, and a sept of the Campbells; he stated that the name was earlier spelt Mac Ure.

In Ireland the name is common particularly in Ulster, and mainly found in County Antrim, County Down, County Londonderry and County Tyrone. The first recorded evidence of the name in Ulster is of those who came from Scotland with Sir Hugh Montgomery in 1606 to settle in North Down on lands ceded by the O'Neill family. They were chiefly Presbyterian, with some Episcopalians, and a few Roman Catholics and Quakers. According to Bell, the earliest record of the name in Ireland is that of a family in County Tyrone in 1655. However, according to Orr, the earliest record of the name in Ireland is of Richard Orr of Clontarf in 1563.

In Scotland, the name is first known to have been recorded in Renfrewshire. Historian Edward MacLysaght suggests that the name in Scotland derives from the parish of Urr in Kirkcudbrightshire. Indeed, the River Urr flowed through the area. A tradition of some of the Orrs in Northern Ireland has it that they were descended from outlawed brothers whose original family name was McLean; they crossed this river and then made their way by boat to Donaghadee in County Down in the early 17th century. Having escaped persecution, they took river's name as their surname and settled in Newtownards.

== People ==
- Adrian Orr (born 1962), Governor of the Reserve Bank of New Zealand
- Alan Stewart Orr (1911–1991), Scottish-born Lord Justice of Appeal
- Alexander D. Orr (1761–1835), American farmer and politician
- Alexander Ector Orr (1831–1914), pioneer of the New York City subway system
- Alice Orr-Ewing (born 1989), British actress
- Alice Greenough Orr (1902–1995), American rodeo star
- Andy Orr (born 1980), member of the Irish band Six
- Sir Archibald Orr-Ewing, 1st Baronet (1847–1893), Scottish politician
- Arthur Orr (born 1964), American politician
- Benjamin Orr (1947–2000), bass guitarist and singer-songwriter of The Cars
- Benjamin Orr (Massachusetts politician) (1772–1828), American politician
- Bobby Orr (born 1948), Canadian Hall-of-Fame ice hockey player
- Bradley Orr (born 1982), English footballer
- Buxton Orr (1924–1997), British composer
- C. Rob Orr (born 1950), American swimmer and coach
- Charles Lindsay Orr-Ewing (1860–1903), Scottish politician
- Charles Wilfred Orr (1893–1976), English composer
- Christopher Orr (disambiguation), several people
- Colton Orr (born 1982), Canadian ice hockey player
- Danny Orr (born 1979), English rugby league footballer
- Dave Orr (1859–1915), American baseball player
- David Orr (born 1944), American politician
- David Malcolm Orr (born 1953), UK civil engineer
- David W. Orr, American professor of environmental studies and politics
- David Orr (journalist) (born 1974), American journalist and poetry reviewer
- David Orr (businessman) (1922–2008), Anglo-Irish businessman, philanthropist and World War II veteran
- Deborah Orr (1962–2019), British newspaper columnist
- Doug Orr (born 1937), Scottish footballer
- Douglas Orr (1892–1966), American architect
- Edith Orr (1870–1955), Scottish golfer
- Emma Restall Orr (born 1965), British neo-druid
- Eric Orr (1939–1998), American artist
- Frank Orr (cricketer) (1879–1967), English cricketer
- Gary Orr (born 1967), Scottish golfer
- Gregory Orr (filmmaker) (born 1954), American writer and director
- Gregory Orr (poet) (born 1947), American poet
- Gustavus Orr (1819–1887), early pioneer for public education in Georgia
- Hugh Orr (inventor) (1715–1798), Scottish-born American gunsmith, inventor and politician
- H. Allen Orr, American professor
- James Lawrence Orr (1822–1873), American politician
- James Orr (disambiguation), several people
- Jimmy Orr (1935–2020), American football player
- John Orr (disambiguation), several people
- Johnny Orr (basketball, born 1927) (1927–2013), American basketball coach
- Jonathan Orr (born 1983), American football player
- Kaleb Elarms-Orr (born 2003), American football player
- Kay A. Orr (born 1939), American politician
- Leon Orr (born 1992), American football player
- Leonard Orr (born c. 1938), American developer of "Rebirthing-breathwork"
- Louis Orr (artist) (1876–1966), American artist
- Louis Orr (1958–2022), American basketball coach and former player
- M. A. Orr (1867–1949), British astronomer and Dante scholar, aka "Mary Acworth Orr Evershed"
- Margaret Orr, American television meteorologist
- Marion Alice Orr (1918–1995), Canadian aviator
- Mary Orr (1910–2006), American author
- Mary Orr (figure skater) (born 1996), Canadian pair skater
- Matthew Orr (businessman) (born 1962), British entrepreneur
- Matthew Young Orr (1883–1953), British botanist
- Nick Orr (born 1995), American football player
- Osborne Orr (1895–1918), World War I flying ace
- Pete Orr (born 1979), Canadian baseball player
- Pete Orr (racing driver) (1956–2002), American stock car racing driver
- Philip Orr (born 1950), Irish Rugby International prop-forward
- Robert Orr (disambiguation), several people
- Robin Orr (1909–2006), Scottish composer
- Rodney Orr (died 1994), American NASCAR driver
- Ron Orr (born 1954 or 1955), Canadian politician
- Scott Orr, American video game designer
- Shantee Orr (born 1981), American football player
- Sheena Shirley Orr (born 1959), original name of Scottish singer Sheena Easton
- Stephens Orr, Scottish photographer
- Stewart Orr (1872–1944), Scottish artist
- Sydney Sparkes Orr (1914–1966), British/Australian philosopher
- Vickie Orr (born 1967), American basketball player
- Virgil Orr (1923–2021), Louisiana educator and politician
- Warren H. Orr (1888–1962), American jurist and politician
- Wesley Fletcher Orr (1831–1898), Canadian businessman, journalist and politician
- William Orr (disambiguation), several people
- Wyc Orr (1946–2014), American politician and lawyer
- Zachary Orr (born 1992), former professional football player

=== Fictional characters ===
- Orr, bomber pilot in the novel Catch-22 by Joseph Heller
- George Orr, protagonist in the novel The Lathe of Heaven by Ursula K. Le Guin
- John Orr, protagonist in the novel The Bridge by Iain Banks

== See also ==
- Judge Orr (disambiguation)
- Justice Orr (disambiguation)
- Senator Orr (disambiguation)
- Orr (disambiguation), place names and other meanings
- Orrville (disambiguation), other places named after people with this name
- Orrery
