= John Orr =

John or Johnny Orr may refer to:

- John Boyd Orr (1880–1971), Scottish doctor, biologist, politician and Nobel peace laureate
- Sir John Orr (police officer, born 1918) (1918–1995), Scottish police officer and the first chief constable of Lothian & Borders Police
- John Herbert Orr (1911–1984), American entrepreneur
- John Leonard Orr (born 1949), American arsonist, former fire captain and arson investigator
- John Orr (bishop) (1874–1938), Bishop of Tuam, Killala, and Achonry
- John Orr (businessman) (1858–1932), founder of John Orr's, a South African department store chain
- Sir John Orr (police officer, born 1945) (1945–2018), Scottish police officer, Chief Constable of Strathclyde Police
- John Orr (rugby union) (1865–1935), Scottish rugby football player
- John Orr (scholar of French) (1885–1966), British linguist
- John Stewart Orr (1930–2001), Scottish medical physicist and researcher
- Johnny Orr (basketball, born 1918) (1918–1982), American basketball and baseball player
- Johnny Orr (basketball, born 1927) (1927–2013), American basketball player and coach
- Johnny Orr (footballer) (1888–1971), Scottish footballer with Blackburn Rovers
- John William Orr (1815–1887), known professionally as J. W. Orr, American wood engraver
- John Orr (bowls, born 1870) (1870–?), Scottish lawn bowler
- John Orr (bowls, born 1995), Scottish indoor bowler
- John Orr (priest), Irish Anglican priest

== See also ==
- Jack Orr (John B. Orr Jr., c.1920-1974), American politician and mayor of Miami-Dade County, Florida
- John Orr's, former department store in South Africa
- Orr (disambiguation)
- Orr (surname)
