= List of United States representatives in the 19th Congress =

This is a complete list of United States representatives during the 19th United States Congress listed by seniority. For the most part, representatives are ranked by the beginning of their terms in office.

As an historical article, the districts and party affiliations listed reflect those during the 19th Congress (March 4, 1825 – March 3, 1827). Seats and party affiliations on similar lists for other congresses will be different for certain members.

This article describes the criteria for seniority in the House of Representatives and sets out the list of members by seniority. It is prepared on the basis of the interpretation of seniority applied to the House of Representatives in the current congress. In the absence of information to the contrary, it is presumed that the twenty-first-century practice is identical to the seniority customs used during the 19th Congress.

== House seniority ==
Seniority in the House, for representatives with unbroken service, depends on the date on which the members first term began. That date is either the start of the Congress (4 March in odd numbered years, for the era up to and including the 73rd Congress starting in 1933) or the date of a special election during the Congress. Since many members start serving on the same day as others, ranking between them is based on alphabetical order by the last name of the representative.

Representatives in early congresses were often elected after the legal start of the Congress. Such representatives are attributed with unbroken seniority, from the legal start of the congressional term, if they were the first person elected to a seat in a Congress. The date of the election is indicated in a note.

The seniority date is normally taken from the members entry in the Biographical Directory of the United States Congress, except where the date given is the legal start of the Congress and the actual election (for someone who was not the first person elected to the seat in that Congress) was later. The date of election is taken from United States Congressional Elections 1788-1997. In a few instances the latter work provides dates, for the start and end of terms, which correct those in the Biographical Directory.

The Biographical Directory normally uses the date of a special election, as the seniority date. However, mostly in early congresses, the date of the member taking his seat can be the one given. The date of the special election is mentioned in a note to the list below, when that date is not used as the seniority date by the Biographical Directory.

Representatives who returned to the House, after having previously served, are credited with service equal to one less than the total number of terms they served. When a representative has served a prior term of less than two terms (i.e. prior term minus one equals less than one), he is ranked above all others whose service begins on the same day.

== Leadership ==
In this Congress the only formal leader was the speaker of the House. A speakership election was held on December 5, 1825. John W. Taylor (A-NY) was elected on the second ballot. He had previously been speaker for the second session of the 16th Congress (1820–21).

Candidate	1st ballot	2nd ballot
John W. Taylor (A-NY)	89	99
John W. Campbell (A-OH)	41	42
Louis McLane (J-DE)	36	44
Andrew Stevenson (J-VA)	17	05
John Condict (A-NJ)	06	...
Scattering	05	03

The title Dean of the House (sometimes known, in the nineteenth century, as Father of the House) was held by the member with the longest continuous service. It was not a formal leadership position.

== Standing committees ==
The House created its first standing committee, on April 13, 1789. There were twenty-five standing committees, listed in the rules used by the 19th Congress. During the Congress two new standing committees were created.

On December 9, 1825, a Committee on Revolutionary Pensions was set up (with a change of name to Military Pensions on December 13, 1825). The existing Committee on Pensions and Revolutionary Claims, was also renamed as the Committee on Revolutionary Claims, on December 13.

A second new standing committee, on the Territories, was named on December 13, 1823.

Committees, in this period, were normally appointed for a session at a time by the speaker. However the resolution of March 30, 1816, which created the committees on departmental expenditures and Expenditures on Public Buildings, provided for those standing committees to be appointed for the whole Congress.

This list refers to the standing committees of the House in the 19th Congress, the year of establishment as a standing committee, the number of members assigned to the committee and the dates of appointment in each session (or if appropriate for the Congress), the end of the session (if appropriate) and its chairman. Chairmen, who were re-appointed after serving in the previous Congress, are indicated by an *.

The first session was December 5, 1825 – May 22, 1826 (169 days) and the second session was December 4, 1826 – March 3, 1827 (90 days).

No.	Committee	From	Members	Term	Chairman
1	Accounts	1805	3	December 7, 1825 – May 22, 1826	*Samuel C. Allen (A-MA)
1	Accounts	1805	3	December 6, 1826 – March 3, 1827	*Samuel C. Allen (A-MA)
2	Agriculture	1820	7	December 7, 1825 – May 22, 1826	*Stephen Van Rensselaer (A-NY)
2	Agriculture	1820	7	December 6, 1826 – March 3, 1827	*Stephen Van Rensselaer (A-NY)
3	Claims	1794	7	December 7, 1825 – May 22, 1826	*Lewis Williams (A-NC)
3	Claims	1794	7	December 6, 1826 – March 3, 1827	*Lewis Williams (A-NC)
4	Commerce	1795	7	December 7, 1825 – May 22, 1826	*Thomas Newton Jr. (A-VA)
4	Commerce	1795	7	December 6, 1826 – March 3, 1827	Gideon Tomlinson (A-CT)
5	District of Columbia	1808	7	December 7, 1825 – May 22, 1826	*Joseph Kent (A-MD) (a)
5	District of Columbia	1808	7	December 6, 1826 – March 3, 1827	Mark Alexander (J-VA)
6	Elections	1789	7	December 7, 1825 – May 22, 1826	*John Sloane (A-OH)
6	Elections	1789	7	December 6, 1826 – March 3, 1827	*John Sloane (A-OH)
7	Expenditures in the Navy Department	1816	3	December 7, 1825-March 3, 1827	Jeremiah O'Brien (A-ME)
8	Expenditures in the Post Office Department	1816	3	December 7, 1825-March 3, 1827	William Wilson (A-OH)
9	Expenditures in the State Department	1816	3	December 7, 1825-March 3, 1827	John Bailey (A-MA)
10	Expenditures in the Treasury Department	1816	3	December 7, 1825-March 3, 1827	William Burleigh (A-ME)
11	Expenditures in the War Department	1816	3	December 7, 1825-March 3, 1827	John Mattocks (A-VT)
12	Expenditures on Public Buildings	1816	3	December 7, 1825-March 3, 1827	Joseph Johnson (J-VA)
13	Foreign Affairs	1822	7	December 7, 1825 – May 22, 1826	*John Forsyth (J-GA)
13	Foreign Affairs	1822	7	December 6, 1826 – March 3, 1827	*John Forsyth (J-GA)
14	Indian Affairs	1821	7	December 7, 1825 – May 22, 1826	*John Cocke (J-TN)
14	Indian Affairs	1821	7	December 6, 1826 – March 3, 1827	*John Cocke (J-TN)
15	Judiciary	1813	7	December 7, 1825 – May 22, 1826	*Daniel Webster (A-MA)
15	Judiciary	1813	7	December 6, 1826 – March 3, 1827	*Daniel Webster (A-MA)
16	Manufactures	1819	7	December 7, 1825 – May 22, 1826	Rollin C. Mallary (A-VT)
16	Manufactures	1819	7	December 6, 1826 – March 3, 1827	Rollin C. Mallary (A-VT)
17	Military Affairs	1822	7	December 7, 1825 – May 22, 1826	*James Hamilton Jr. (J-SC)
17	Military Affairs	1822	7	December 6, 1826 – March 3, 1827	Joseph Vance (A-OH)
18	Military Pensions	1825	7	December 9, 1825 – May 22, 1826	Tristram Burges (A-RI)
18	Military Pensions	1825	7	December 6, 1826 – March 3, 1827	Tristram Burges (A-RI)
19	Naval Affairs	1822	7	December 7, 1825 – May 22, 1826	Henry A. Storrs (A-NY)
19	Naval Affairs	1822	7	December 6, 1826 – March 3, 1827	Henry A. Storrs (A-NY)
20	Post Office and Post Roads	1808	7	December 7, 1825 – May 22, 1826	Samuel D. Ingham (J-PA)
20	Post Office and Post Roads	1808	7	December 6, 1826 – March 3, 1827	Samuel D. Ingham (J-PA)
21	Private Land Claims	1816	7	December 7, 1825 – May 22, 1826	*John W. Campbell (A-OH)
21	Private Land Claims	1816	7	December 6, 1826 – March 3, 1827	Richard A. Buckner (A-KY)
22	Public Expenditures	1814	7	December 7, 1825 – May 22, 1826	Weldon N. Edwards (J-NC)
22	Public Expenditures	1814	7	December 6, 1826 – March 3, 1827	Weldon N. Edwards (J-NC)
23	Public Lands	1805	7	December 7, 1825 – May 22, 1826	*Christopher Rankin (J-MS) (b)
23	Public Lands	1805	7	December 6, 1826 – March 3, 1827	John Scott (A-MO)
24	Revisal and Unfinished Business	1795	3	December 7, 1825 – May 22, 1826	Thomas P. Moore (J-KY)
24	Revisal and Unfinished Business	1795	3	December 6, 1826 – March 3, 1827	Thomas P. Moore (J-KY)
25	Revolutionary Claims	1813	7	December 7, 1825 – May 22, 1826	*Peter Little (A-MD)
25	Revolutionary Claims	1813	7	December 6, 1826 – March 3, 1827	Robert Allen (J-TN)
26	Territories	1825	7	December 13, 1825 – May 22, 1826	James Strong (A-NY)
26	Territories	1825	7	December 6, 1826 – March 3, 1827	James Strong (A-NY)
27	Ways and Means	1802	7	December 7, 1825 – May 22, 1826	*Louis McLane (J-DE)
27	Ways and Means	1802	7	December 6, 1826 – March 3, 1827	*Louis McLane (J-DE)

Notes:-

- (a) Joseph Kent (A-MD) resigned from the House, on January 6, 1826. Mark Alexander (J-VA) became Chairman for the rest of the session.
- (b) Christopher Rankin (J-MS) died on March 14, 1826. John Scott (A-MO) became Chairman for the rest of the session.

== List of representatives by seniority ==
A numerical rank is assigned to each of the 213 members initially elected to the 19th Congress. Other members, who were not the first person elected to a seat but who joined the House during the Congress, are not assigned a number.

Five representatives-elect were not sworn in, as they resigned (NH-al :Miller, KY-3, PA-16: Allison, SC-1, VA-5). The list below includes the representatives-elect (with name in italics), with the seniority they would have held if sworn in. James Miller of New Hampshire was elected as a Democratic-Republican candidate. As Miller never served in Congress, his allegiance at the time of the 19th Congress has not been ascertained.

Party designations of representatives used in this article (except for James Miller) are A for Anti-Jacksonian (a supporter of President John Quincy Adams) and J for Jacksonian (an ally of Andrew Jackson). Territorial delegates have not been given a party label, as the Biographical Directory does not specify a party for delegates in this Congress. Designations used for past service, in the 4th to 18th Congresses, are (DR) for Democratic-Republican members and (F) for Federalist representatives. For the 18th Congress only, each party is further divided based upon the presidential candidates supported. The prefixes used are A- for Adams-Clay supporters, C- for the followers of Crawford and J- for the Jackson men.

U.S. House seniority
Rank	Representative	Party	District	Seniority date	Notes
Thirteen consecutive terms
1	Thomas Newton Jr.	A	VA-1	March 4, 1801	Previously served (DR) 1801-23 and (A-DR) 1823-25 while in the House. Elected to this Congress: April 1825. Dean of the House. Chairman: Commerce (1825–26).
Twelve non-consecutive terms
2	John Randolph	J	VA-5	March 4, 1819	Previously served (DR) 1799–1813, 1815–17, 1819–23 and (C-DR) 1823-25 while in the House. Elected to this Congress: April 1825. Resigned, as Representative-elect, to become U.S. Senator: December 26, 1825. Last term while serving in the House until 20th Congress.
Nine non-consecutive terms
3	Willis Alston	J	NC-2	March 4, 1825	Previously served (DR) 1799-1815 while in the House. Elected to this Congress: August 11, 1825.
4	Burwell Bassett	J	VA-8	March 4, 1821	Previously served (DR) 1805–13, 1815–19, 1821–23 and (C-DR) 1823-25 while in the House. Elected to this Congress: April 1825.
Eight consecutive terms
5	William McCoy	J	VA-19	March 4, 1811	Previously served (DR) 1811-23 and (C-DR) 1823-25 while in the House. Elected to this Congress: April 1825.
Seven consecutive terms
6	John W. Taylor	A	NY-17	March 4, 1813	Previously served (DR) 1813-23 and (A-DR) 1823-25 while in the House. Speaker of the House.
Seven non-consecutive terms
7	Lemuel Sawyer	J	NC-1	March 4, 1825	Previously served (DR) 1807-13 and 1817-23 while in the House. Elected to this Congress: August 11, 1825.
8	Peter Little	A	MD-5	September 2, 1816	Previously served (DR) 1811–13, September 2, 1816–23 and (J-DR) 1823-25 while in the House. Chairman: Revolutionary Claims (1825–26).
9	Henry Clay	A	KY-3	March 4, 1823	Previously served (DR) 1811-January 19, 1814, 1815, October 30, 1815–21 and (A-DR) 1823-25 while in the House. Resigned, as Representative-elect, to become U.S. Secretary of State: March 6, 1825.
Six consecutive terms
10	Lewis Williams	A	NC-13	March 4, 1815	Previously served (DR) 1815-23 and (C-DR) 1823-25 while in the House. Elected to this Congress: August 11, 1825. Chairman: Claims.
11	Weldon N. Edwards	J	NC-6	February 7, 1816	Previously served (DR) February 7, 1816–23 and (C-DR) 1823-25 while in the House. Elected to this Congress: August 11, 1825. Chairman: Public Expenditures. Last term while serving in the House.
Six non-consecutive terms
12	Joseph Kent	A	MD-2	March 4, 1819	Previously served (DR) 1811–15, 1819–23 and (A-DR) 1823-25 while in the House. Chairman: District of Columbia (1825–26). Resigned, to become Governor: January 6, 1826.
13	Lewis Condict	A	NJ-al	October 9, 1821	Previously served (DR) 1811–17, October 9, 1821–23 and (J-DR) 1823-25 while in the House.
14	John Forsyth	J	GA-al	March 4, 1823	Previously served (DR) 1813-November 23, 1818 (resigned as Representative to 15th and Representative-elect to 16th Congress) and (C-DR) 1823-25 while in the House. Chairman: Foreign Affairs.
Five consecutive terms
15	Samuel C. Allen	A	MA-7	March 4, 1817	Previously served (F) 1817-23 and (A-F) 1823-25 while in the House. Chairman: Accounts.
16	John W. Campbell	A	OH-5	March 4, 1817	Previously served (DR) 1817-23 and (J-DR) 1823-25 while in the House. Chairman: Private Land Claims (1825–26). Last term.
17	John Floyd	J	VA-20	March 4, 1817	Previously served (DR) 1817-23 and (C-DR) 1823-25 while in the House. Elected to this Congress: April 1825.
18	Robert S. Garnett	J	VA-12	March 4, 1817	Previously served (DR) 1817-23 and (C-DR) 1823-25 while in the House. Elected to this Congress: April 1825. Last term while serving in the House.
19	Louis McLane	J	DE-al	March 4, 1817	Previously served (F) 1817-23 and (C-F) 1823-25 while in the House. Chairman: Ways and Means. Last term while in the House (elected to 20th Congress but resigned).
20	Charles F. Mercer	A	VA-14	March 4, 1817	Previously served (F) 1817-23 and (C-DR) 1823-25 while in the House. Elected to this Congress: April 1825.
21	David Trimble	A	KY-1	March 4, 1817	Previously served (DR) 1817-23 and (A-DR) 1823-25 while in the House. Last term while serving in the House.
22	Starling Tucker	J	SC-9	March 4, 1817	Previously served (DR) 1817-23 and (J-DR) 1823-25 while in the House.
23	Enoch Lincoln	A	ME-5	November 4, 1818	Previously served (DR-MA) November 4, 1818–21, 1821–23 and (A-DR) 1823-25 while in the House. Resigned while still serving in the House in 1826.
Five non-consecutive terms
24	Joseph Hemphill	J	PA-2	March 4, 1819	Previously served (F) 1801–03, 1819–23 and (J-F) 1823–25. Resigned: 1826. Last term while serving in the House until 21st Congress.
25	Edward Livingston	J	LA-1	March 4, 1823	Previously served (DR-NY) 1795-1801 and (J-DR) 1823-25 while in the House.
26	John Reed Jr.	A	MA-13	March 4, 1821	Previously served (F) 1813–17, 1821–23 and (A-F) 1823-25 while in the House.
27	Alfred Cuthbert	J	GA-al	March 4, 1821	Previously served (DR) December 13, 1813 – November 9, 1816, 1821–23 and (C-DR) 1823-25 while in the House. Last term while serving in the House.
28	Samuel D. Ingham	J	PA-8	October 8, 1822	Previously served (DR) 1813-July 6, 1818, October 8, 1822–23 and (J-DR) 1823-25 while in the House. Chairman: Post Office and Post Roads.
Four consecutive terms
29	Mark Alexander	J	VA-4	March 4, 1819	Previously served (DR) 1819-23 and (C-DR) 1823-25) while in the House. Elected to this Congress: April 1825. Chairman: District of Columbia (1826–27).
30	Robert Allen	J	TN-5	March 4, 1819	Previously served (DR) 1819-23 and (J-DR) 1823-25 while in the House. Elected to this Congress: August 4–5, 1825. Chairman: Revolutionary Claims (1826–27). Last term while serving in the House.
31	John Cocke	J	TN-2	March 4, 1819	Previously served (DR) 1819-23 and (J-DR) 1823-25 while in the House. Elected to this Congress: August 4–5, 1825. Chairman: Indian Affairs. Last term while serving in the House.
32	Daniel P. Cook	A	IL-al	March 4, 1819	Previously served (DR) 1819-23 and (A-DR) 1823–25. Last term while serving in the House.
33	Samuel Edwards	J	PA-4	March 4, 1819	Previously served (F) 1819-23 and (J-F) 1823-25 while in the House. Last term while serving in the House.
34	Samuel Lathrop	A	MA-8	March 4, 1819	Previously served (F) 1819-23 and (A-F) 1823-25 while in the House. Elected to this Congress: April 4, 1825. Last term while serving in the House.
35	Thomas Metcalfe	A	KY-2	March 4, 1819	Previously served (DR) 1819-23 and (A-DR) 1823-25 while in the House.
36	Christopher Rankin	J	MS-al	March 4, 1819	Previously served (DR) 1819-23 and (J-DR) 1823-25 while in the House. Chairman: Public Lands (1825–26). Died while still serving in the House.: March 14, 1826.
37	John Sloane	A	OH-12	March 4, 1819	Previously served (DR) 1819-23 and (A-DR) 1823-25 while in the House. Chairman: Elections.
38	Gideon Tomlinson	A	CT-al	March 4, 1819	Previously served (DR) 1819-23 and (A-DR) 1823-25 while in the House. Elected to this Congress: April 4, 1825. Chairman: Commerce (1826–27). Last term while serving in the House.
39	Silas Wood	A	NY-1	March 4, 1819	Previously served (F) 1819-23 and (A-DR) 1823-25 while in the House.
40	William S. Archer	J	VA-3	January 3, 1820	Previously served (DR) January 3, 1820–23 and (C-DR) 1823-25 while in the House. Elected to this Congress: April 1825.
41	Rollin C. Mallary	A	VT-2	January 13, 1820	Previously served (DR) January 13, 1820–23 and (A-DR) 1823-25 while in the House. Chairman: Manufactures
42	Francis Johnson	A	KY-10	November 13, 1820	Previously served (DR) November 13, 1820–23 and (A-DR) 1823-25 while in the House. Last term while serving in the House.
43	Aaron Hobart	A	MA-11	November 24, 1820	Previously served (DR) November 24, 1820–23 and (A-DR) 1823-25 while in the House. Last term while serving in the House.
Four non-consecutive terms
44	Philemon Beecher	A	OH-9	March 4, 1823	Previously served (F) 1817-21 and (A-DR) 1823-25 while in the House.
45	Henry R. Storrs	A	NY-14	March 4, 1823	Previously served (F) 1817-21 and (A-F) 1823-25 while in the House. Chairman: Naval Affairs.
46	Daniel Webster	A	MA-1	March 4, 1823	Previously served (F-NH) 1813-17 and (A-F) 1823–25. Chairman: Judiciary.
47	John Taliaferro	A	VA-13	March 24, 1824	Previously served (DR) 1801–03, December 2, 1811–13 and (C-DR) March 24, 1824-25 while in the House. Elected to this Congress: April 1825.
Three consecutive terms
48	Noyes Barber	A	CT-al	March 4, 1821	Previously served (DR) 1821-23 and (A-DR) 1823-25 while in the House. Elected to this Congress: April 4, 1825.
49	Francis Baylies	J	MA-12	March 4, 1821	Previously served (F) 1821-23 and (J-F) 1823-25 while in the House. Last term.
50	James Buchanan	J	PA-4	March 4, 1821	Previously served (F) 1821-23 and (J-F) 1823-25 while in the House.
51	George Cassedy	J	NJ-al	March 4, 1821	Previously served (DR) 1821-23 and (J-DR) 1823–25. Last term while serving in the House.
52	Henry W. Connor	J	NC-11	March 4, 1821	Previously served (DR) 1821-23 and (J-DR) 1823-25 while in the House. Elected to this Congress: August 11, 1825.
53	Henry W. Dwight	A	MA-9	March 4, 1821	Previously served (F) 1821-23 and (A-F) 1823-25 while in the House.
54	Patrick Farrelly	J	PA-18	March 4, 1821	Previously served (DR) 1821-23 and (J-DR) 1823-25 while in the House. Died while still serving in the House.: January 12, 1826.
55	Joseph Gist	J	SC-7	March 4, 1821	Previously served (DR) 1821-23 and (J-DR) 1823-25 while in the House. Last term while serving in the House.
56	Ebenezer Herrick	A	ME-3	March 4, 1821	Previously served (DR) 1821-23 and (A-DR) 1823-25 while in the House. Elected to this Congress: September 12, 1825. Last term while serving in the House.
57	George Holcombe	J	NJ-al	March 4, 1821	Previously served (DR) 1821-23 and (J-DR) 1823-25 while in the House.
58	John Long	A	NC-10	March 4, 1821	Previously served (DR) 1821-23 and (C-DR) 1823-25 while in the House. Elected to this Congress: August 11, 1825.
59	George McDuffie	J	SC-5	March 4, 1821	Previously served (DR) 1821-23 and (J-DR) 1823-25 while in the House.
60	James S. Mitchell	J	PA-10	March 4, 1821	Previously served (DR) 1821-23 and (J-DR) 1823-25 while in the House. Last term while serving in the House.
61	Gabriel Moore	J	AL-1	March 4, 1821	Previously served (DR) 1821-23 and (J-DR) 1823-25 while in the House. Elected to this Congress: August 1, 1825.
62	George Plumer	J	PA-17	March 4, 1821	Previously served (DR) 1821-23 and (J-DR) 1823-25 while in the House. Last term while serving in the House.
63	Joel R. Poinsett	J	SC-1	March 4, 1821	Previously served (DR) 1821-23 and (J-DR) 1823-25 while in the House. Resigned, as Representative-elect: March 7, 1825.
64	Romulus M. Saunders	J	NC-9	March 4, 1821	Previously served (DR) 1821-23 and (C-DR) 1823-25 while in the House. Elected to this Congress: August 11, 1825. Last term while serving in the House until 27th Congress.
65	William Smith	J	VA-21	March 4, 1821	Previously served (DR) 1821-23 and (C-DR) 1823-25 while in the House. Elected to this Congress: April 1825. Last term while serving in the House.
66	Andrew Stevenson	J	VA-9	March 4, 1821	Previously served (DR) 1821-23 and (C-DR) 1823–25. Elected to this Congress: April 1825.
67	Andrew Stewart	J	PA-14	March 4, 1821	Previously served (DR) 1821-23 and (J-DR) 1823-25 while in the House.
68	Samuel Swan	A	NJ-al	March 4, 1821	Previously served (DR) 1821-23 and (J-DR) 1823-25 while in the House.
69	Edward F. Tattnall	J	GA-al	March 4, 1821	Previously served (DR) 1821-23 and (C-DR) 1823-25 while in the House.
70	Wiley Thompson	J	GA-al	March 4, 1821	Previously served (DR) 1821-23 and (C-DR) 1823-25 while in the House.
71	Joseph Vance	A	OH-4	March 4, 1821	Previously served (DR) 1821-23 and (A-DR) 1823-25 while in the House. Chairman: Military Affairs (1826–27).
72	Thomas Whipple Jr.	A	NH-al	March 4, 1821	Previously served (DR) 1821-23 and (A-DR) 1823-25 while in the House.
73	John Wilson	J	SC-6	March 4, 1821	Previously served (DR) 1821-23 and (J-DR) 1823-25 while in the House. Last term while serving in the House.
74	John Scott	A	MO-al	August 10, 1821	Previously served Delegate August 6, 1816 – January 13, 1817 and August 4, 1817–21; Representative (DR) August 10, 1821–23 and (A-DR) 1823–25. Chairman: Public Lands (1826–27). Last term while serving in the House.
75	John Findlay	J	PA-11	October 9, 1821	Previously served (DR) October 9, 1821–23 and (J-DR) 1823-25 while in the House. Last term while serving in the House.
76	Churchill C. Cambreleng	J	NY-3	December 3, 1821	Previously served (DR) 1821-23 and (C-DR) 1823-25 while in the House.
77	Stephen Van Rensselaer	A	NY-10	February 27, 1822	Previously served (F) February 27, 1822–23 and (A-F) 1823-25 while in the House. Chairman: Agriculture.
78	Jonathan Jennings	A	IN-2	December 2, 1822	Previously served Delegate November 27, 1809 – December 11, 1816; Representative (DR) December 2, 1822–23 and (J-DR) 1823-25
79	Andrew R. Govan	J	SC-4	December 4, 1822	Previously served (DR) December 4, 1822–23 and (J-DR) 1823–25. Last term.
80	John Carter	J	SC-8	December 11, 1822	Previously served (DR) December 11, 1822–23 and (J-DR) 1823-25 while in the House.
81	James Hamilton Jr.	J	SC-2	December 13, 1822	Previously served (DR) December 13, 1822–23 and (J-DR) 1823–25. Chairman: Military Affairs (1825–26).
82	John C. Wright	A	OH-11	March 4, 1823	Previously served (DR) 17th Congress, but resigned before term started and (A-DR) 1823-25
Three non-consecutive terms
83	William C. Bradley	A	VT-1	March 4, 1823	Previously served (DR) 1813-15 and (A-DR) 1823-25 while in the House. Last term while serving in the House.
84	James Strong	A	NY-8	March 4, 1823	Previously served (F) 1819-21 and (A-F) 1823-25 while in the House. Chairman: Territories.
85	George Peter	J	MD-3	March 4, 1825	Previously served (F) October 7, 1816-19 while in the House. Last term while serving in the House.
Two consecutive terms
86	Adam R. Alexander	J	TN-9	March 4, 1823	Previously served (J-DR) 1823-25 while in the House. Elected to this Congress: August 4–5, 1825. Last term while serving in the House.
87	James Allison Jr.	J	PA-16	March 4, 1823	Previously served (J-DR) 1823-25 while in the House. Resigned, as Representative-elect: August 26, 1825.
88	John S. Barbour	J	VA-15	March 4, 1823	Previously served (C-DR) 1823-25 while in the House. Elected to this Congress: April 1825.
89	Ichabod Bartlett	A	NH-al	March 4, 1823	Previously served (A-DR) 1823-25 while in the House.
90	Mordecai Bartley	A	OH-14	March 4, 1823	Previously served (A-DR) 1823-25 while in the House.
91	John Blair	J	TN-1	March 4, 1823	Previously served (J-DR) 1823-25 while in the House. Elected to this Congress: August 4–5, 1825.
92	William L. Brent	A	LA-3	March 4, 1823	Previously served (A-DR) 1823-25 while in the House.
93	Richard A. Buckner	A	KY-8	March 4, 1823	Previously served (A-DR) 1823-25 while in the House. Chairman: Private Land Claims (1826–27).
94	William Burleigh	A	ME-1	March 4, 1823	Previously served (A-DR) 1823-25 while in the House. Chairman: Expenditures in the Treasury Department.
95	George Cary	J	GA-al	March 4, 1823	Previously served (C-DR) 1823-25 while in the House. Last term while serving in the House.
96	Benjamin W. Crowninshield	A	MA-2	March 4, 1823	Previously served (A-DR) 1823-25 while in the House.
97	Daniel Garrison	J	NJ-al	March 4, 1823	Previously served (J-DR) 1823-25 while in the House. Last term while serving in the House.
98	Henry H. Gurley	A	LA-2	March 4, 1823	Previously served (A-DR) 1823-25 while in the House.
99	Robert Harris	J	PA-6	March 4, 1823	Previously served (J-DR) 1823-25 while in the House. Last term while serving in the House.
100	Moses Hayden	A	NY-27	March 4, 1823	Previously served (A-DR) 1823-25 while in the House. Last term while serving in the House.
101	Robert P. Henry	J	KY-12	March 4, 1823	Previously served (J-DR) 1823-25 while in the House. Died: August 25, 1826 while serving in the House.
102	Samuel Houston	J	TN-7	March 4, 1823	Previously served (J-DR) 1823-25 while in the House. Elected to this Congress: August 4–5, 1825. Last term while serving in the House.
103	Jacob C. Isacks	J	TN-4	March 4, 1823	Previously served (J-DR) 1823-25 while in the House. Elected to this Congress: August 4–5, 1825.
104	Joseph Johnson	J	VA-18	March 4, 1823	Previously served (J-DR) 1823-25 while in the House. Elected to this Congress: April 1825. Chairman: Expenditures on Public Buildings. Last term until 22nd Congress.
105	David Kidder	A	ME-7	March 4, 1823	Previously served (A-DR) 1823-25 while in the House. Last term while serving in the House.
106	George Kremer	J	PA-9	March 4, 1823	Previously served (J-DR) 1823-25 while in the House.
107	Robert P. Letcher	A	KY-4	March 4, 1823	Previously served (A-DR) 1823-25 while in the House.
108	John Locke	A	MA-6	March 4, 1823	Previously served (A-DR) 1823-25 while in the House.
109	Willie P. Mangum	J	NC-8	March 4, 1823	Previously served (C-DR) 1823-25 while in the House. Elected to this Congress: August 11, 1825. Resigned while still serving in the House.: March 18, 1826.
110	Philip S. Markley	A	PA-5	March 4, 1823	Previously served (J-DR) 1823-25 while in the House. Last term while serving in the House.
111	Henry C. Martindale	A	NY-18	March 4, 1823	Previously served (A-F) 1823-25 while in the House.
112	Dudley Marvin	A	NY-26	March 4, 1823	Previously served (A-DR) 1823-25 while in the House.
113	Samuel McKean	J	PA-9	March 4, 1823	Previously served (J-DR) 1823-25
114	John McKee	J	AL-2	March 4, 1823	Previously served (J-DR) 1823-25 while in the House. Elected to this Congress: August 1, 1825.
115	William McLean	A	OH-3	March 4, 1823	Previously served (A-DR) 1823-25 while in the House.
116	Daniel H. Miller	J	PA-3	March 4, 1823	Previously served (J-DR) 1823-25 while in the House.
117	George E. Mitchell	J	MD-6	March 4, 1823	Previously served (A-DR) 1823-25 while in the House. Last term while serving in the House until 21st Congress.
118	Thomas P. Moore	J	KY-7	March 4, 1823	Previously served (J-DR) 1823–25. Chairman: Revisal and Unfinished Business.
119	Jeremiah O'Brien	A	ME-6	March 4, 1823	Previously served (A-DR) 1823-25 while in the House. Chairman: Expenditures in the Navy Department.
120	George W. Owen	J	AL-3	March 4, 1823	Previously served (J-DR) 1823-25 while in the House. Elected to this Congress: August 1, 1825.
121	William C. Rives	J	VA-10	March 4, 1823	Previously served (C-DR) 1823-25 while in the House. Elected to this Congress: April 1825.
122	Robert S. Rose	A	NY-26	March 4, 1823	Previously served (A-DR) 1823–25. Last term until 21st Congress.
123	Egbert E. Ten Eyck	J	NY-20	March 4, 1823	Previously served (C-DR) 1823-25 while in the House. Unseated, after an election contest: December 15, 1825.
124	John Test	A	IN-3	March 4, 1823	Previously served (J-DR) 1823-25 while in the House. Last term while serving in the House until 21st Congress.
125	Samuel F. Vinton	A	OH-7	March 4, 1823	Previously served (A-DR) 1823-25 while in the House.
126	Elisha Whittlesey	A	OH-13	March 4, 1823	Previously served (A-DR) 1823-25 while in the House.
127	Charles A. Wickliffe	J	KY-9	March 4, 1823	Previously served (J-DR) 1823-25 while in the House.
128	Henry Wilson	J	PA-7	March 4, 1823	Previously served (J-DR) 1823-25 while in the House. Died while still serving in the House: August 14, 1826.
129	James Wilson	A	PA-11	March 4, 1823	Previously served (J-DR) 1823-25 while in the House.
130	William Wilson	A	OH-8	March 4, 1823	Previously served (C-DR) 1823-25 while in the House. Chairman: Expenditures in the Post Office Department.
131	Parmenio Adams	A	NY-29	January 7, 1824	Previously served (A-DR) January 7, 1824–25. Last term.
132	Alexander Thomson	J	PA-13	December 6, 1824	Previously served (J-DR) December 6, 1824-25 while in the House. Resigned while still serving in the House: May 1, 1826.
133	George Wolf	J	PA-8	December 9, 1824	Previously served (J-DR) December 9, 1824–25 while in the House.
134	John Bailey	A	MA-10	December 13, 1824	Previously served (A-DR) December 13, 1824-25 while in the House. Chairman: Expenditures in the State Department.
Two non-consecutive terms
135	John Mattocks	A	VT-5	March 4, 1825	Previously served (DR) 1821-23 while in the House. Chairman:Expenditures in the War Department. Last term while serving in the House until 27th Congress.
136	Archibald McNeill	J	NC-7	March 4, 1825	Previously served (F) 1821-23 while in the House. Elected to this Congress: August 11, 1825. Last term while serving in the House.
137	Ezra Meech	J	VT-4	March 4, 1825	Previously served (DR) 1819-21 while in the House. Last term while serving in the House
138	Thomas R. Mitchell	J	SC-3	March 4, 1825	Previously served (DR) 1821-23 while in the House.
139	Elisha Phelps	A	CT-al	March 4, 1825	Previously served (DR) 1819-21 while in the House. Elected to this Congress: April 4, 1825.
140	Joshua Sands	A	NY-2	March 4, 1825	Previously served (F) 1803–05. Last term while serving in the House.
One term
141	William Addams	J	PA-7	March 4, 1825	
142	John Anderson	J	ME-2	March 4, 1825	
143	William G. Angel	J	NY-13	March 4, 1825	Only term while serving in the House until 21st Congress.
144	William Armstrong	A	VA-16	March 4, 1825	Elected to this Congress: April 1825
145	Henry Ashley	J	NY-11	March 4, 1825	Only term while serving in the House.
146	Luther Badger	A	NY-23	March 4, 1825	Only term while serving in the House.
147	John Baldwin	A	CT-al	March 4, 1825	Elected to this Congress: April 4, 1825
148	John Barney	A	MD-5	March 4, 1825	
149	Ratliff Boon	J	IN-1	March 4, 1825	Only term while serving in the House until 21st Congress
150	John Heritage Bryan	J	NC-4	March 4, 1825	Elected to this Congress: August 11, 1825
151	Tristam Burges	A	RI-al	March 4, 1825	Elected to this Congress: August 30, 1825. Chairman: Military Pensions.
152	Samuel P. Carson	J	NC-12	March 4, 1825	Elected to this Congress: August 11, 1825
153	Nathaniel H. Claiborne	J	VA-7	March 4, 1825	Elected to this Congress: April 1825
154	Thomas Davenport	J	VA-6	March 4, 1825	Elected to this Congress: April 1825
155	John Davis	A	MA-5	March 4, 1825	Elected to this Congress: August 1, 1825
156	William Dietz	J	NY-12	March 4, 1825	Only term while serving in the House.
157	Clement Dorsey	A	MD-1	March 4, 1825	
158	Nehemiah Eastman	A	NH-al	March 4, 1825	Only term while serving in the House
159	Benjamin Estil	A	VA-22	March 4, 1825	Elected to this Congress: April 1825. Only term while serving in the House.
160	Edward Everett	A	MA-4	March 4, 1825	
161	James Findlay	J	OH-1	March 4, 1825	
162	Nicoll Fosdick	A	NY-20	March 4, 1825	Only term while serving in the House.
163	Daniel G. Garnsey	J	NY-30	March 4, 1825	
164	John Hallock Jr.	J	NY-6	March 4, 1825	
165	Jonathan Harvey	J	NH-al	March 4, 1825	
166	Abraham B. Hasbrouck	A	NY-7	March 4, 1825	Only term while serving in the House.
167	Charles E. Haynes	J	GA-al	March 4, 1825	
168	Joseph Healy	A	NH-al	March 4, 1825	Elected to this Congress: March 8, 1825
169	Richard Hines	J	NC-3	March 4, 1825	Elected to this Congress: August 11, 1825. Only term while serving in the House.
170	Michael Hoffman	J	NY-15	March 4, 1825	
171	Gabriel Holmes	J	NC-5	March 4, 1825	Elected to this Congress: August 11, 1825
172	Charles Humphrey	A	NY-25	March 4, 1825	Only term while serving in the House.
173	Ralph I. Ingersoll	A	CT-al	March 4, 1825	Elected to this Congress: April 4, 1825
174	David Jennings	A	OH-10	March 4, 1825	Resigned while still serving in the House: May 25, 1826
175	James Johnson	J	KY-5	March 4, 1825	Died while still serving in the House: August 13, 1826
176	Jeromus Johnson	J	NY-3	March 4, 1825	
177	Charles Kellogg	J	NY-24	March 4, 1825	Only term while serving in the House.
178	John L. Kerr	A	MD-7	March 4, 1825	
179	Joseph Lawrence	A	PA-15	March 4, 1825	
180	Joseph Lecompte	J	KY-6	March 4, 1825	
181	John H. Marable	J	TN-8	March 4, 1825	Elected to this Congress: August 4–5, 1825
182	Henry Markell	A	NY-16	March 4, 1825	
183	Robert N. Martin	A	MD-8	March 4, 1825	Only term while serving in the House.
184	William McManus	A	NY-9	March 4, 1825	Only term while serving in the House.
185	James Meriwether	J	GA-al	March 4, 1825	Only term while serving in the House.
186	Orange Merwin	A	CT-al	March 4, 1825	Elected to this Congress: April 4, 1825
187	James Miller	DR	NH-al	March 4, 1825	Resigned, as Representative-elect: January 3, 1825
188	John Miller	A	NY-22	March 4, 1825	Only term while serving in the House.
189	Charles Miner	A	PA-4	March 4, 1825	
190	James C. Mitchell	J	TN-3	March 4, 1825	Elected to this Congress: August 4–5, 1825
191	John Mitchell	J	PA-12	March 4, 1825	
192	Dutee J. Pearce	A	RI-al	March 4, 1825	Elected to this Congress: November 25, 1825
193	James K. Polk	J	TN-6	March 4, 1825	Elected to this Congress: August 4–5, 1825
194	Timothy H. Porter	A	NY-28	March 4, 1825	Only term while serving in the House.
195	Alfred H. Powell	A	VA-17	March 4, 1825	Elected to this Congress: April 1825. Only term while serving in the House.
196	Henry H. Ross	A	NY-19	March 4, 1825	Only term while serving in the House.
197	Peleg Sprague	A	ME-4	March 4, 1825	Elected to this Congress: April 4, 1825
198	James S. Stevenson	J	PA-16	March 4, 1825	
199	Robert Taylor	A	VA-11	March 4, 1825	Elected to this Congress: April 1825. Only term while serving in the House.
200	John Thomson	J	OH-6	March 4, 1825	Only term while serving in the House. until 21st Congress
201	James Trezvant	J	VA-2	March 4, 1825	Elected to this Congress: April 1825
202	Ebenezer Tucker	A	NJ-al	March 4, 1825	
203	Espy Van Horne	J	PA-9	March 4, 1825	
204	John Varnum	A	MA-3	March 4, 1825	
205	Gulian C. Verplanck	J	NY-3	March 4, 1825	
206	George E. Wales	A	VT-3	March 4, 1825	
207	Aaron Ward	A	NY-4	March 4, 1825	
208	Bartow White	A	NY-5	March 4, 1825	Only term while serving in the House.
209	Elias Whitmore	A	NY-21	March 4, 1825	Only term while serving in the House.
210	John Woods	A	OH-2	March 4, 1825	
211	Thomas C. Worthington	A	MD-4	March 4, 1825	Only term while serving in the House.
212	John Wurts	J	PA-1	March 4, 1825	Only term while serving in the House.
213	William S. Young	A	KY-11	March 4, 1825	
Members joining the House, after the start of the Congress
...	Titus Brown	A	NH-al	March 8, 1825	Special election
...	William Drayton	J	SC-1	May 17, 1825	Special election: May 16–17, 1825
...	James Clark	A	KY-3	August 1, 1825	Previously served (DR) 1813-16 while in the House. Special election.
...	Robert Orr Jr.	J	PA-16	October 11, 1825	Special election
...	Daniel Hugunin Jr.	A	NY-20	December 15, 1825	Seated, after election contest. Only term while serving in the House.
...	George W. Crump	J	VA-5	January 21, 1826	Special election. Only term while serving in the House.
...	John C. Weems	J	MD-2	February 1, 1826	Special election
...	Thomas H. Sill	A	PA-18	March 14, 1826	Special election. Only term while serving in the House until 21st Congress
...	William Haile	J	MS-al	July 10, 1826	Special election: July 11–12, 1826
...	James W. Ripley	J	ME-5	September 11, 1826	Special election: September 11, 1826; 2nd Trial: November 27, 1826
...	Thomas Kittera	A	PA-2	October 10, 1826	Special election. Only term while serving in the House.
...	Daniel L. Barringer	J	NC-8	December 4, 1826	Special election: November 3, 1826
...	Chauncey Forward	J	PA-13	December 4, 1826	Special election: October 10, 1826
...	Jacob Krebs	J	PA-7	December 4, 1826	Special election: October 10, 1826. Only term while serving in the House.
...	Thomas Shannon	A	OH-10	December 4, 1826	Special election: October 10, 1826. Only term while serving in the House.
...	Robert L. McHatton	J	KY-5	December 7, 1826	Special election: November 6, 1826
...	John F. Henry	A	KY-12	December 11, 1826	Special election: November 20, 1826. Only term while serving in the House.
Non voting members
a	Henry W. Conway	-	AR-al	March 4, 1823	Delegate from Arkansas Territory
b	Joseph M. White	-	FL-al	March 4, 1825	Delegate from Florida Territory
c	Austin E. Wing	-	MI-al	March 4, 1825	Delegate from Michigan Territory

== See also ==
- 19th United States Congress
- List of United States congressional districts
- List of United States senators in the 19th Congress
