= John Linehan =

John Linehan may refer to:

- John Linehan (entertainer) (born 1952), Northern Irish entertainer
- John Linehan (basketball) (born 1978), American basketball player and coach

== See also ==
- J. M. A. Lenihan (John Mark Anthony Lenihan, 1918–1993), British clinical physicist and science author
