= 1957–58 Queens Park Rangers F.C. season =

English football club season

Queens Park Rangers
1957–58 season
- Chairman: Albert Hittinger
- Manager: Jack Taylor
- Stadium: Loftus Road
- Football League Third Division South: 10th
- FA Cup: First Round
- Southern Professional Floodlight Cup: Round One
- London Challenge Cup: Round One
- Top goalscorer: League: Arthur Longbottom 17; All: Arthur Longbottom 18
- Highest home attendance: 15,734 v Brentford (24 August 1957)
- Lowest home attendance: 6,093 v Torquay (14 December 1957)
- Biggest win: 5–1 v Northampton Town (23 November 1957)
- Biggest defeat: 0–6 v Southend United (31 August 1957)
Home colours	Away colours	Third colours

The 1957–58 Queens Park Rangers season was the club's 67th season of existence and their 6th back in the Football League Third Division following their relegation in the 1951–52 season. QPR finished 10th in their league campaign, and were eliminated in the third round of the FA Cup. Their 10th place finish in the league qualified the club for the following season's football league merge of division three north and south teams into divisions three and four.

Goalkeeper Ron Springett was sold to first division side Sheffield Wednesday for £10,000 late in the season - within 18 months he was selected to play for England.

== League standings ==
Pos	Team	Pld	W	D	L	GF	GA	GAv	Pts	Promotion or relegation
8	Norwich City	46	19	15	12	75	70	1.071	53	Qualification for the Third Division
9	Bournemouth & Boscombe Athletic	46	21	9	16	81	74	1.095	51	Qualification for the Third Division
10	Queens Park Rangers	46	18	14	14	64	65	0.985	50	Qualification for the Third Division
11	Newport County	46	17	14	15	73	67	1.090	48	Qualification for the Third Division
12	Colchester United	46	17	13	16	77	79	0.975	47	Qualification for the Third Division

== Results ==
QPR scores given first

Win Draw Loss

=== Third Division South ===
Date	Opponent (position prior to match)	H / A	Result F–A	Scorers	Attendance	Position
24 August 1957	Brentford (-)	H	1–0	Petchey	15,734	12
26 August 1957	Colchester (3)	H	1–0	Cameron	12,328	2
31 August 1957	Southend (1)	A	0–6		15,883	8
2 September 1957	Colchester (10)	A	1–2	Finney	8,992	9
7 September 1957	Brighton and Hove Albion (2)	H	0–1		11,139	18
11 September 1957	Swindon (8)	A	1–1	Angell	10,730	17
14 September 1957	Southampton (5)	A	0–5		15,965	21
16 September 1957	Swindon (13)	H	2–1	Locke 2	8,413	17
21 September 1957	Newport County (12)	H	1–1	Woods	9,187	17
23 September 1957	Millwall (6)	H	3–0	Locke 3	11,325	14
28 September 1957	Port Vale (5)	H	1–2	Locke	12,616	17
30 September 1957	Millwall (9)	A	0–5		12,784	19
5 October 1957	Plymouth Argyle (1)	H	1–0	Locke	11,354	17
12 October 1957	Norwich City (4)	A	0–2		19,460	20
19 October 1957	Bournemouth & Boscombe Ath. (10)	H	3–0	Angell, Woods, Woollard (og)	9,007	17
26 October 1957	Walsall (22)	A	2–1	Longbottom 2	7,560	13
2 November 1957	Coventry City (19)	H	3–0	Kerrins 2, Locke	9,246	11
9 November 1957	Shrewsbury Town (17)	A	1–2	Longbottom	8,514	14
23 November 1957	Northampton Town (20)	A	5–1	Longbottom 4, Smith	7,525	11
30 November 1957	Watford (16)	H	3–0	Ingham, Longbottom, Petchey	10,236	9
7-Dec-1957	Crystal Palace	A	PP			
14 December 1957	Torquay (23)	H	1–1	Woods	6,093	11
21 December 1957	Brentford (3)	A	1–1	Cameron	12,084	13
25 December 1957	Gillingham (21)	A	1–1	Standley	7,233	12
26 December 1957	Gillingham (21)	H	1–1	Woods	8,658	13
28 December 1957	Southend United (8)	H	1–1	Woods	10,072	13
4-Jan-1958	Aldershot	H	PP			
11 January 1958	Brighton and Hove Albion (1)	A	1–1	Longbottom	13,322	13
18 January 1958	Southampton (5)	H	3–2	Longbottom 2, Woods (pen)	8,611	12
25 January 1958	Reading (4)	A	0–3		11,455	12
1 February 1958	Newport County (7)	A	2–4	Dawson, Longbottom	7,543	12
8 February 1958	Port Vale (7)	H	2–1	Cameron, Longbottom	7,594	12
15 February 1958	Plymouth Argyle (3)	A	1–3	Cameron	17,068	15
22 February 1958	Norwich City (5)	H	1–1	Cameron	7,935	13
1 March 1958	Bournemouth & Boscombe Ath. (12)	A	1–4	Dawson	12,711	14
3 March 1958	Aldershot (18)	H	0–1`		7,744	14
8 March 1958	Walsall (22)	H	1–0	Cameron	6,548	13
15 March 1958	Coventry City (23)	A	1–1	Locke	7,673	13
17 March 1958	Reading (2)	H	3–0	Woods, Longbottom, Petchey	8,838	12
22 March 1958	Northampton Town (17)	H	1–0	Longbottom	7,531	11
29 March 1958	Torquay (24)	A	1–3	Locke	5,172	12
4 April 1958	Exeter City (24)	H	1–1	Cameron	10,223	11
5-Apr-1958	Shrewsbury Town	H	PP			
7 April 1958	Exeter City (23)	A	0–0		7,078	12
12 April 1958	Watford (17)	A	0–0		8,022	12
16 April 1958	Crystal Palace (15)	A	3–2	Longbottom, Kerrins, Locke	18,712	11
19 April 1958	Crystal Palace (15)	H	4–2	Kerrins, Longbottom, Cameron, Locke	11,868	11
23 April 1958	Aldershot (19)	A	1–1	Kerrins	4,058	10
28 April 1958	Shrewsbury Town (17)	H	3–0	Kerrins 2, Locke	6,193	10

=== London Challenge Cup ===
Date	Round	Opponents	H / A	Result F–A	Scorers	Attendance
7 October 1957	First Round	Leyton Orient	H	3–4*aet		

=== Southern Professional Floodlight Cup ===
Date	Round	Opponents	H / A	Result F–A	Scorers	Attendance
14 October 1957	First Round	Reading	H	0–0		*
6 November 1957	First Round Replay	Reading	A	2–5	Kerrins, Locke	6377

=== FA Cup ===
Date	Round	Opponents	H / A	Result F–A	Scorers	Attendance
16 November 1957	First Round	Clapton F.C. (Isthmian League)	A	1–1	Dawson	8,000
18 November 1957	First Round Replay	Clapton F.C. (Isthmian League)	H	3–1	Longbottom, Locke, Walsh (og)	12,786
7 December 1957	Second Round	Hereford United F.C.(Southern League)	A	1–6	Smith	14,000

=== Friendlies ===
Date	Opponentts		Score	Scorer
17-Aug-57	Whites v Reds	Practice Match		
4-Jan-58	Queens Park Rangers v Pegasus	Friendly		
24-Mar-58	Queens Park Rangers v Showbiz XI	Friendly		
26-Apr-58	Reading v Queens Park Rangers	Friendly		

== Squad ==
Position	Nationality	Name	League Appearances	League Goals	Cup Appearances	F.A.Cup Goals	Southern Professional Floodlight Cup Goals	Total Appearances	Total Goals
GK	(England)	Ron Springett	34		4			38	
GK	(England)	Ray Drinkwater	11					11	
GK	(England)	Bob Fry	1		1			2	
DF	(England)	Tony Ingham	46	1	5			51	1
DF	(England)	Keith Rutter	46		5			51	
DF	(England)	Pat Woods	44	6	5			44	6
DF	(England)	Walter Colgan	2					2	
MF	(England)	Pat Kerrins	31	7	5		1	36	8
MF	(England)	Cecil Andrews	12		2			14	
MF	(England)	Peter Angell	45	2	4			49	2
MF	(England)	Arthur Longbottom	40	17	4	1		44	18
MF	(Scotland)	Bobby Cameron	37	8	4			41	8
MF	(England)	George Petchey	46	3	5			51	3
MF	(England)	Tom Standley	14	2				14	2
MF	(Northern Ireland)	Mike Powell	1					1	
FW	(England)	Mike Tomkys	5					5	
FW	(Scotland)	Lesley Locke	22	13	3	1	1	36	15
FW	(Northern Ireland)	Alec Dawson	33	2	5	1		38	2
FW	(Scotland)	Doug Orr	5					5	
FW	(England)	Albert Allum	1					1	
FW	(England)	Terry Peacock	2					2	
FW	(England)	Eddie Smith	18		3	1		18	1

== Transfers In ==
Name	from	Date	Fee
Eddie (Ginger) Smith	Colchester United	July 4, 1957	£1,050
Bob Fry	Bath City	August 16, 1957	
Ray Drinkwater	Portsmouth	February 28, 1958	
Pat Welton	Leyton Orient	Mar 17,1958	
David Dunsmuir	Dundee	May 31, 1958	
John Pearson	Brentford	June 1958	
Mike Keen		June 1958	

== Transfers Out ==
Name	from	Date	Fee	Date	Club	Fee
Alan Silver	Maidenhead U	September 30, 1952		July 1957	Tunbridge Wells	
Keith Petchey	Millwall	July 24, 1956		July 1957	Watford	
Albert Pounder	Charlton	February 12, 1954	£500	July 1957	Sittingbourne	
Jesilimi (Tesi) Balogun	Skegness Town	September 1 956		July 1957	Holbeach United	
Arthur Rhodes				July 1957	Tonbridge	
Jobey Dean	Thoresby Colliery	November 27, 1952		July 1957	Sutton Town	
Bill Temby				July 1957	Dover Town	
Tom Quigley	Portsmouth	June 4, 1956		August 1957	Worcester City	
Albert Allum	Dover	June 1, 1957		November 1957	Dover	
Ken Humphrey	Ware Town	March 1957		February? 1958		
Terry Robinson *	Northampton	July ?1958		February 1958	Hendon	
Ron Springett	Victoria United	February 19, 1953		March 1958	Sheffield Wednesday	£10,000
Doug Orr *	Queen's Park	June 14, 1957		May 1958	Queen's Park	
Eddie (Ginger) Smith	Colchester	July 4, 1957		May 1958	Chelmsford City	
