= Celebrity branding =

Form of advertising campaign or marketing strategy

Celebrity branding, also called celebrity endorsement, is a marketing approach where a well-known person is used to promote a product, service, or cause. The idea is that the positive image of the celebrity transfers to the brand, which can increase public attention and trust.

This type of marketing appears in areas such as sports, fashion, entertainment, and technology. Nonprofit groups also use celebrities to draw attention to social issues. The impact of celebrity branding often depends on how well the celebrity's image matches the product and how authentic the connection appears to audiences.

== History ==
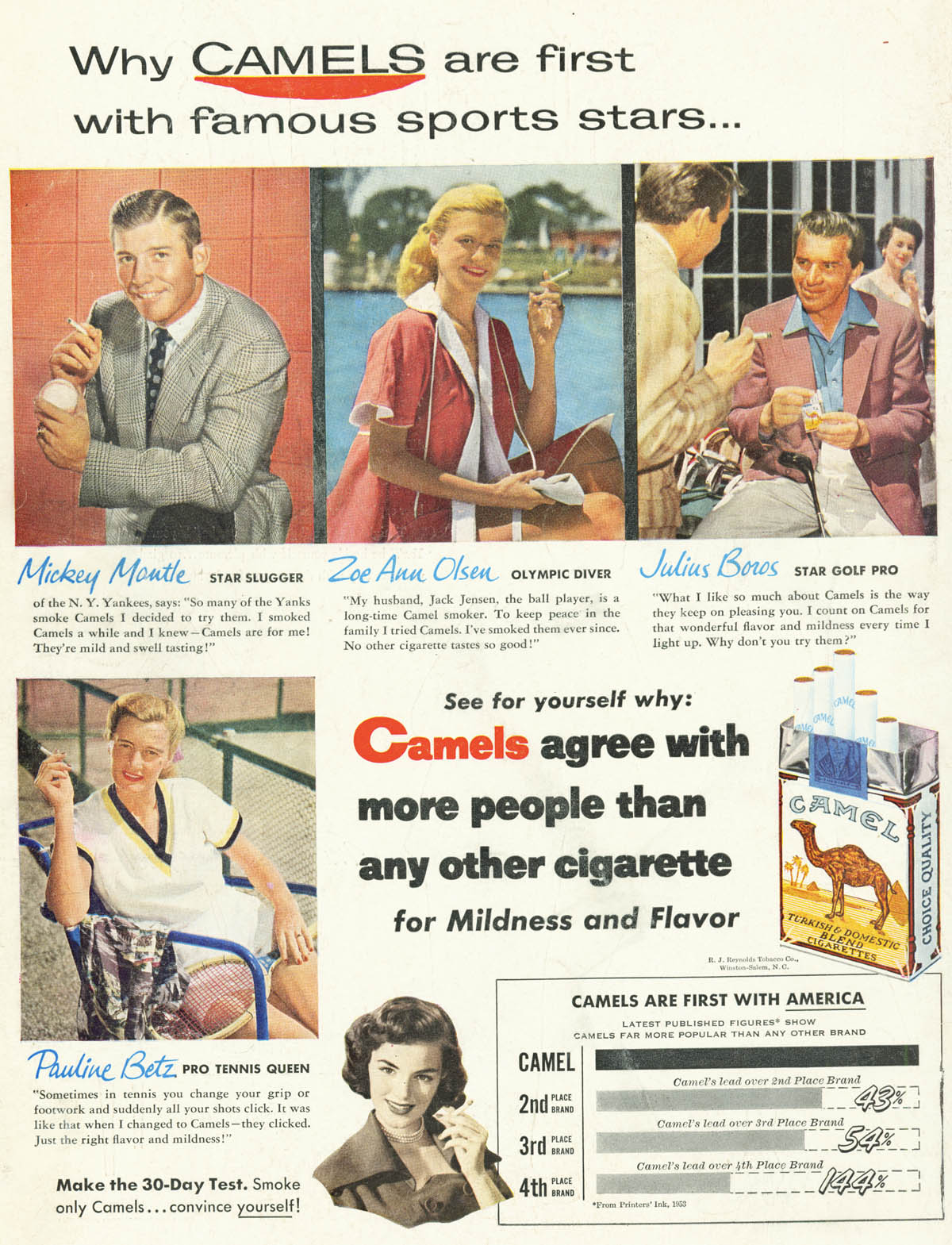
1949 advertisement for Camel cigarettes

In the 1700s, Wedgwood, producers of fine chinaware, used royal endorsements as a marketing device to show value in the company and promote their product. In 1850, the hatter John Genin used the Jenny Lind tour of America to promote his business. In 1882, London socialite and West End stage actress Lillie Langtry became the poster-girl for Pears Soap, making her the first celebrity to endorse a commercial product. In the late 1800s, trading cards were introduced, a card with an image of a celebrity and a product description which was either given to the customer or inserted in product packaging. Cigarette companies gave away baseball cards as part of a customer loyalty scheme, and the increased demand to buy cigarettes in order to collect entire sets of baseball players was exploited by marketers. Early endorsements of this kind didn't always have the permission of the celebrities to use their image. In the 1930s the trend was toward athletes, such as with Babe Ruth's paid endorsement of Red Rock Cola. By 1945, the trend changed to movie stars. In 1965 when color television was introduced, television personalities and entertainers became the celebrity endorsers. In the 1980s, companies started making products around celebrities, for example Nike using Michael Jordan.

In the 1970s, with the advent of free agency, the value of celebrity endorsements escalated, and correspondingly the pay of the athletes by their teams. By 1989, 75% of all sports-related products were using athletes for endorsements, and by the 1990s sports endorsements were being announced with press releases. This led to celebrities becoming spokespeople and brand ambassadors for companies, and a corresponding increase in the value of endorsement contracts.

Celebrity endorsements surged during the early 21st century, with elite athletes emerging as among the most sought after.

== Brand recognition ==
Brand recognition is a huge part of celebrity branding. Brand recognition is where the general public is able to establish a brand from its attributes. It is most successful when a brand is exposed without a company name and is then recognized by the customer through the visual signifiers such as logos, slogans, and colors. An example of this is Coke whereby their signature color is red and consumers acknowledge that. Brand recognition is extremely effective in promotional campaigns. To measure brand recognition and the effectiveness it has on promotional campaigns, companies will conduct experiments on study groups for results. If brands are equal in quality similar products brand recognition will always have an advantage of higher sales.

Celebrity endorsements may be designed as explicit, implicit, or both. An example of explicit endorsement can be seen through Beyoncé's sponsorship deal with PepsiCo. In 2012, Beyoncé and PepsiCo sat down and penned a partnership deal that is estimated to be worth approx. $50 million, that embraces the standard Pepsi print and TV commercials that Beyoncé will appear in, as well as a more unorthodox 'creative fund' for any future projects Beyoncé chooses to take on. The collaboration between Beyoncé and Pepsi has been described as a high-profile example of an explicit celebrity endorsement, in which a long-term partnership is used to promote both the brand and the performer.

An example of implicit endorsement can be explained by noticing the growing number of Beats by Dre portable speakers that have been appearing in pop and hip-hop music videos, (such music videos include Lady Gaga, Miley Cyrus, Nicki Minaj and Britney Spears). The celebrities involved are not expressly mentioning the Beats product within their music videos, but their presence amongst these celebrities convey the message of it being a high-quality product associated with those of a high social class, particularly those who are industry leaders in music.

== Advantages ==
Celebrity endorsements can build brand equity. An example of this is Nike. Prior to Michael Jordan, Nike mostly sponsored tennis and track athletes and decided to expand their market, which increased sales to become a multibillion-dollar company. Celebrity endorsement is used as an advertising strategy, by using celebrity status and image, to promote a brand's recognition, recall, and differentiation.

A celebrity endorser who utilizes the product, and has some knowledge about it, is presumed to be able to promote the product in a more persuasive way Having celebrity source that is perceived as trustworthy or reliable creates a endorsement that has the power to compel consumers.

Celebrities in advertising make the advertisement more noticeable to some consumers, and are therefore a good basis of capturing and retaining consumer attention. Studies have shown that using celebrities in advertising increases the message's persuasiveness which results in consumers having a better recall and recognition for the product or brand.

Some celebrities are held at a higher regard than others, thus, an endorsement of a product/brand can potentially build trust in the consumer for the brand. Celebrities are perceived to hold qualities such as attractiveness, expertise, trustworthiness and likeability, which advertisers hope will be transferred to the brand or product consequently creating positive images for that product or brand. Many consumers idolize celebrities and strive to imitate their lives with the clothes they wear and products they consume.

== Disadvantages ==
Due to the high-profile lives of celebrities that are constantly being reviewed and scrutinized by the media, there are risks of using celebrities in advertising.

The term "eclipsing" (also referred to as overshadowing) is used to describe the instance where a celebrity in an advertisement overshadows the product being advertised by occupying more time or space than the product being advertised, this is a negative for the advertiser as the product is not the main focus for the consumers.

Overexposure refers to the negative effect that is a result of when a celebrity endorses multiple products of a similar type at one time. Consumers can become more skeptical of the celebrity's motives to endorse products and therefore may perceive the celebrity to be less credible when endorsing multiple products.

Celebrity endorsements do not guarantee long-term favorable effects. If a celebrity endorser is caught up in a scandal, negative perceptions of the celebrity among consumers can be transferred to the brand, One of the largest profile celebrity endorsement scandals of recent history was the infidelity scandal of Tiger Woods in 2009, at the time, Woods was a brand ambassador for Nike Golf apparel and footwear. Reports estimated that Nike's losses ranged between US$5 and US$12 billion following the scandal.

Changes in a celebrity's image, such as due to injury, changes in physical appearance, change in marital status, or a decline in professional visibility, can result in the celebrity endorser no longer suiting the product or brand being endorsed.

== Risks ==
When a celebrity is promoting a brand there can be risks involved, where there is a miscommunication between the consumer and the representation of the product. In some cases, there is no connection between the product and the celebrity, which can become an effective or a defective result due to the position and relevance of the product. When celebrity branding does not work out for a firm, the celebrity can be seen as a scheme to promote the person as a marketing instrument. Ideally, some consumers believe that companies who use celebrity endorsers, as a marketing strategy to promote a product should choose an endorser who utilizes and enjoys using the product. Therefore, ethically they are trusting the brand and showing potential consumers the effects of the product and making the advertisement more believable. Rather than a celebrity endorser who is promoting the brand just because of their social status and there is no relevance between the product and the celebrity.

Companies who use celebrity endorsers are at a risk financially, whether they are choosing the right celebrity endorser to represent their brand and return the favor with an increase in sales, or for the brand to become known on a wider scale. Firms are also taking risks in hoping that their chosen celebrity endorser will portray their brand in the correct way, because any small or big mistake can cost the company in a negative outcome, especially due to the celebrity's social status it can affect a huge audience. This could be due to miscommunication between the firm and the endorser advertising the product or service.

=== Risk for companies ===
The entire aim of marketing and advertising is to draw attention to one's business and persuade or manipulate the target market into consuming goods or services. The more attention brought to the company, the larger opportunities are gained to communicate with consumers. Using celebrity branding, there is an advantage because the particular endorser already has a large audience and following, thus attention can be drawn easily. It is how the business uses this attention that decides whether the outcome is beneficial or negative to the brand because there are strong impacts if an error is made due to the many people watching and making judgments. The theory of market senses/sensory marketing is where a marketer relates to an audience on an emotional level. By taking advantage of the already built attention, the right celebrity branding whether the brand is looking for a celebrity with sex appeal or a reputation of charity or generosity, these can develop an emotional response and connection from consumers which can benefit the business greatly. Though if celebrities possess undesired traits, this can generate a negative emotional response which would turn consumers away from a brand.

==== Effectiveness ====
A source (defined as the individual or group that intends to communicate an idea, or message to their target audience, also known as a sender,) will be more effective in their objective to convince consumers to purchase a product if the receivers perceive them as attractive, credible, and powerful. The attractiveness of the sender is determined by how much the audience likes the person that is making the statements about the company/product. The credibility can refer to how much we trust the individual's opinions/morals, and how convincing their belief in the product that they are sponsoring is. An individual is considered powerful when they can "affect behavior because of perceived reward or punishment".

One of the clearest examples of the importance of a celebrity's credibility when endorsing a product can be seen with Tiger Woods' endorsement of Nike in 2000. The involvement of Tiger Woods within Nike "resulted in the acquisition of approximately 4.5 million customers and $60 million in profit". However, following the 2009 scandal, when Woods was found to have had relationships with several women while married to his wife, Nike began to see shifts in their sales. According to a study conducted by Carnegie Mellon University's Tepper School of Business, "the scandal cost Nike $1.7 million in sales and lost the company nearly 105,000 customers".

In the digital era, the effectiveness of celebrity endorsements has expanded beyond traditional advertising to include influencer marketing on social platforms, where engagement metrics such as likes, comments, and shares often determine campaign success.

== Usage ==
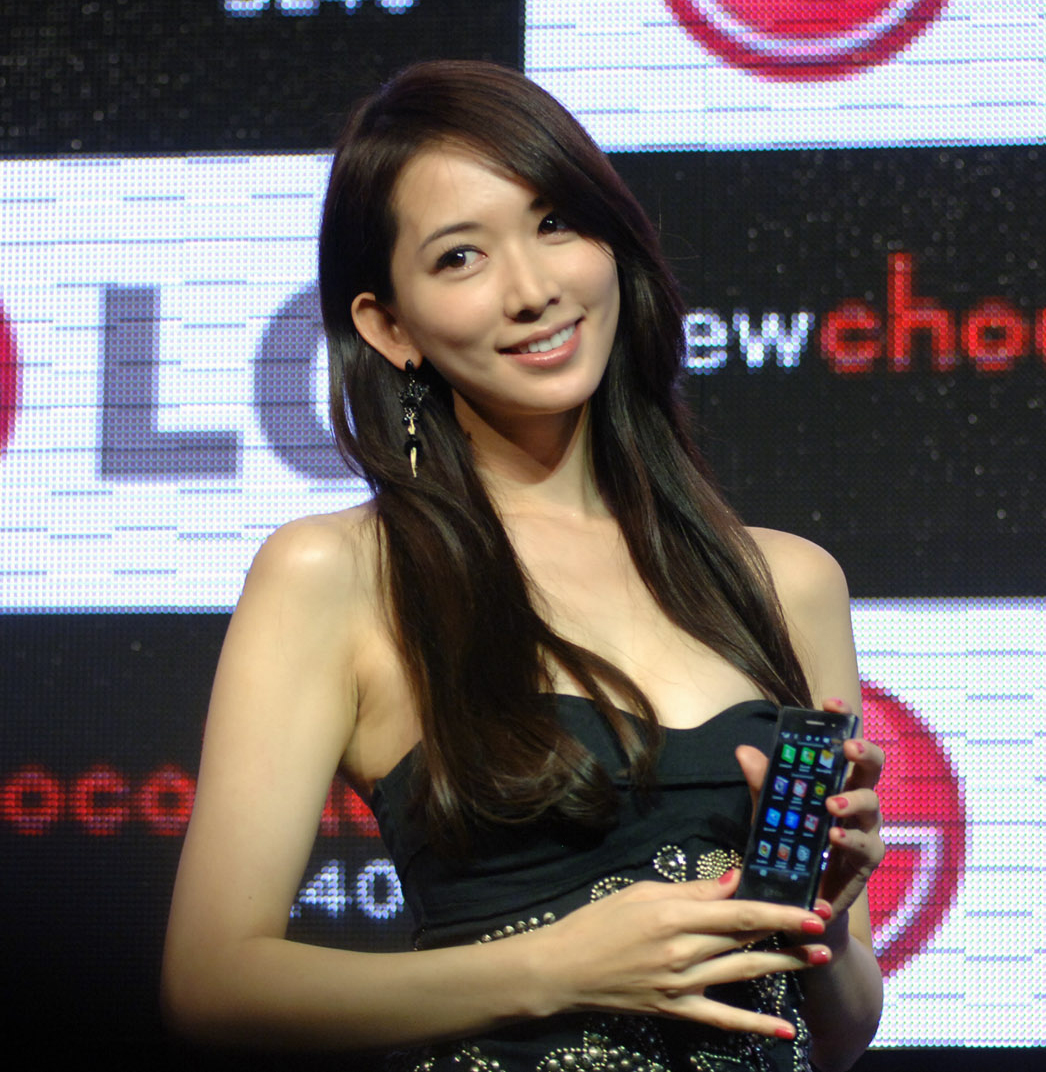
Actress and model Lin Chi-ling at the LG New Chocolate (BL40) phone launching event in 2009, Hong Kong

Celebrity branding is used to help create a further image as a brand. The use of celebrities helps to humanize the brand. This creates a brand identity as consumers begin to relate the celebrities' characteristics with the brands. There are different ways celebrity branding can be used in paid and unpaid endorsement methods.

Celebrity branding can take several different forms, from the appearance of a celebrity in advertisements for a product, service or charity, to a celebrity attending PR events, creating their own line of products or services, or using their name as a brand. The most popular forms of celebrity brand lines are for clothing and fragrances. Some singers, models and film stars have at least one licensed product or service which bears their name. The use of a celebrity or of a sports professional can have a huge impact on a brand. For example, sales of Nike golf apparel and footwear doubled after Tiger Woods was signed up on a sponsorship deal.

Celebrities also provide voice-overs for advertising. Some celebrities have distinct voices which are recognisable even when faces are not visible on a screen. This is a more subtle way to add celebrity branding to a product or service. An example of such an advertising campaign is, Sean Connery's voice-over for Level 3 Communications.

However, in some cases the celebrity did not give permission to be associated with the brand and was wrongly attributed to the brand. For example, on 23 July 2008, Taco Bell launched their "Why Pay More?" campaign and used 50 Cent's name and trademark as a way to endorse their low-cost menus. 50 Cent was unaware of this endorsement and therefore sought out legal action. He filed a lawsuit against Taco Bell and sued for $4 million. He won the case.

=== Paid endorsement ===
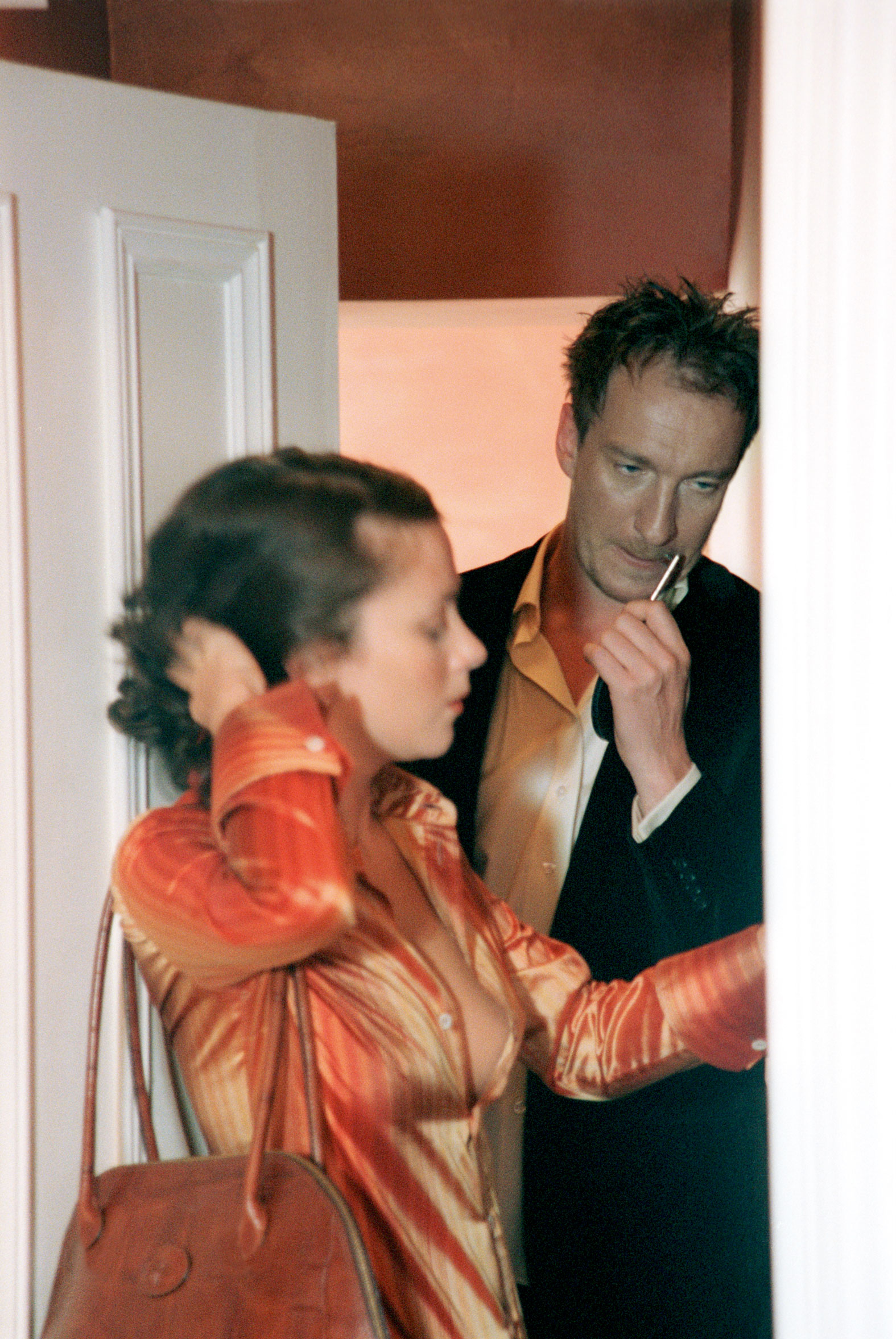
In 2001, actress Anna Friel and her partner David Thewlis, who posed for fashion photographer Henry Bond, were reportedly paid £50,000 to appear in Mulberry's 2001 autumn/winter campaign.

Paid endorsement or overt endorsement involves a contract between the brand and the celebrity to represent the brand in an advertising campaign. The contract may involve some restraints on the celebrity's act; such as cutting their hair or endorsing a direct competitor. Paid endorsements involves a contract between the brand and the celebrity to represent the brand. The celebrity will generally gain a sum of money for endorsing the brand but also have a few guidelines to follow.

Along with traditional advertising, other examples of paid endorsements include appearances at public relations events and brand promotions on social media.

In 2009, growing concern about consumers being misled by celebrity endorsers on social media platforms led to the Federal Trade Commission introducing a set of guidelines to protect consumers called "Guides Concerning the Use of Endorsements and Testimonials in Advertising". As a result, celebrity endorsers are required to advise consumers when they have been paid to endorse a product, this can be done through the use of hashtags #ad, #spon, #paid.

=== Unpaid endorsement ===
Unpaid endorsement or covert endorsement occurs when a celebrity wears or uses the product of a certain brand because they like it. Brands can send free samples to celebrities to try out their product, and review or use on social media to give their opinion on the product. Many beauty companies use this to get YouTube reviewers to review their product so they get free advertising. Sometimes a celebrity is given merchandise by a brand to use or wear in public where there is maximum exposure, such as an event. This is called "gifting" and the celebrity might endorse the brand by taking a photo of the gift and putting it on their social media account for their fans and followers to see. Whilst the "gifting" may appear to be unpaid, costs are associated with this endorsement, as the brand does not have any contract in place with the celebrity and will have little or no protection against what happens during the unpaid endorsement.

Celebrities are seen wearing or using the product due to liking it themselves. They could be seen wearing the product in public or in photos on social media. This is 'free advertising' for the brand. A disadvantage of this is the brand has no control over what message or image the celebrity associated with the brand is portraying.

== Celebrity endorser criteria ==
A positive attitude is associated with attractive people. The more attractive a celebrity is, the more effective the endorsement will be. They look at the physical attributes the celebrity has such as body shape, facial features, and nationality. Physically attractive models serve a decorative, rather than an active, role in ads by sending an indirect, positive message to the viewer. Attractiveness is often leveraged in ads for the cosmetic or fashion industry.

The appeal of a celebrity among those who know that celebrity is calculated using a Q Score, which divides the percentage of participants that personally find a given celebrity favorable by the percentage of respondents who are aware of the celebrity's existence. A high Q-score indicates the celebrity having a high attractiveness by their audience. The average Q-score is around 18 for celebrity performers.

Celebrity endorsement also affects the celebrity. The brand itself can have a positive and negative influence on the celebrities' image showing a reverse effect of the celebrity endorsing the brand.

== Effectiveness ==
A 2011 report by Brand Affinity Technologies (BAT), a celebrity marketing company, analysed 200 social media endorsements against comparable social media advertisements that did not feature any celebrities. The results showed that 50% improvement was made in cost-per-action for endorsed messages over non-endorsed advertising, and the click-through-rates for endorsed messages were 17~21 times higher.

=== Match-up hypothesis ===
The match-up hypothesis generally suggests that the image of the product or the brand that is being endorsed by the celebrity should match the image of the celebrity to make an effective advertisement. The match-up hypothesis is only relevant when the product or the brand that is being advertised is related to a product that enhances one's attractiveness.

Consumers decipher the cultural codes embodied in celebrity images and actively identify personal, social and cultural meaning in these idols. Therefore, this is why celebrity branding and endorsing through technology has become increasingly more of a trend with initial touch points of communicational advertising. More and more corporate brands are enlisting celebrities to differentiate their brand and create a more competitive advantage through media. For example, if there are two brands that have a similar or identical product, it is almost guaranteed that the brand with the more established and well-known celebrity will be more successful in sales and interest. Big companies such as Adidas and Nike use high-profile celebrities to appeal to the emotional side of the average consumer. Celebrities provide much more than entertainment. They influence consumers' perceptions, behaviors, values and decisions.

== Celebrity entrepreneurial branding ==
Celebrity entrepreneurial branding refers to when a celebrity associates themselves as a financial stakeholder and/or decision maker of a product line. There are three types of involvement that a celebrity can have with the branding of a product line, these are mono-branding, co-branded celebrity products and noncelebrity-branded products. Clothing and fragrances are the most common types of product lines.

=== Mono-branding ===
Mono-branding refers to when a product carries only the name of the celebrity and the manufacturer does not directly associate itself with the product. Mono-branding is commonly used to expand the customer base, or to extend the brands. An example of this, is the collaboration between manufacturer Elizabeth Arden and Britney Spears who created the Britney Spears fragrance line.

=== Co-branded celebrity products ===
Co-branded celebrity products refers to a strategic alliance between two brands, to develop, produce and market a product, whilst all parties retain their name. state there are three levels of co-branding: reach/awareness co-branding, value endorsement co-branding and value awareness co-branding. Reach/awareness co-branding is the lowest level and its purpose is to maximize brand awareness. On the second level is value endorsement co-branding which aims to align either both or one of the brand's values in the consumers mind. Finally, ingredient co-branding. This level of co-brandings aims to create higher value creation by using the product of a market leading brand "as a component of another brand". Co-branded celebrity products is commonly used in order to create greater value, expand customer base and increase brand awareness for both brands involved. An example of a co-branded celebrity product is the collaboration between Taylor Swift and Keds footwear who in 2012 released a range of shoes called the Taylor Swift for Keds Collection.

=== Noncelebrity-branded products ===
Noncelebrity-branded products are products that are not branded with the manufacturer or the celebrity's name. This method of celebrity branding is commonly used when the endorsing celebrity has a 'narrow audience', is of limited appeal to the wider market, or the celebrity-product relationship is not a perfect fit. The product or brand may have better success or broader appeal if it is not directly associated with the celebrity entrepreneurial endorser. This is largely common in the food industry, with many celebrities opening restaurants for example Arnold Schwarzenegger opened Schatzi, an Austrian restaurant. An example of this in an alternative industry is the clothing line 6126, which was founded by Lindsay Lohan.

== Relating to marketing and advertising ==
Celebrities are sometimes referred to as opinion leaders or OLs. An opinion leader is a well-known individual or group that is used to help influence an opinion on a certain subject or matter due to their perceived social standing. This is different from an opinion former, who is someone who holds professional expertise due to previous study and/or employment and is known to be knowledgeable within the field.

Opinion leaders are used for the pre-purchase period when a consumer is most interested in the marketing of the product they are intending to buy. The power of the persuasion that the opinion leader possesses will change depending on many different factors. The first is their credibility, this also works in turn with perceived trustworthiness. Consumers are more likely to believe that the campaign is genuine if the opinion leader is someone who has a reputation for being honest and credible. Another factor is their expertise in that field, although they don't have to be at an opinion former's level of expertise, any previous actions, study or jobs that may help the consumer believe that they do know a little bit about what they are promoting, also helps with the authenticity of the advert. For some, the more superficial values hold the most weight in persuasion so the mere fact that the OL is attractive is a key for them, also their social standing not only effects the reach of promotion, but also can attribute to the persuasiveness. People who are the most effected by opinion leaders are those who are often engaged under the peripheral route. The peripheral route is less analytical of the actual product at hand, but will be persuaded due to other factors including an opinion leader that the consumer likes, or attractive elements of the packaging. Whereas those who undertake the central route of persuasion are less affected by these often superficial features and are more likely to choose an option based on the merits of the products or the strength of the argument.

== Modern developments ==
In recent years, celebrity branding has shifted toward social media. Platforms like Instagram, YouTube, and TikTok allow both celebrities and influencers to share products directly with their audiences. These endorsements often look more personal and informal than traditional advertising.

Many celebrities now create and promote their own brands. Examples include Rihanna's Fenty Beauty and Ryan Reynolds' Aviation Gin. This form of celebrity entrepreneurship lets public figures control their image and business decisions more closely.

The U.S. Federal Trade Commission (FTC) requires influencers and celebrities to clearly show when a post is paid or sponsored. This rule helps make online advertising more transparent for consumers.

== See also ==
- Celebrity–industrial complex
- Influencer marketing
- Promotional model
- Staunton chess set (1849), possibly the first product marketed through celebrity endorsement
- Testimonial
