= John Nicholas Genin =

John Nicholas Genin (19 October 1819, New York City – 30 April 1878, New York City) was a New York City hatter who reached national prominence in the 1850s. Like P.T. Barnum, his neighbor on Broadway, Genin had a remarkable knack for using publicity to boost his business. In 1850, at Barnum's urging, Genin made the winning auction bid of $225 for the first seat sold for the sensational cross-country tour by the singer Jenny Lind, the Swedish Nightingale, and reaped the tremendous publicity that followed. Every important newspaper in the country reported Genin's bid. Barnum wrote in his "Struggles and Triumphs" (1865) that "John N. Genin, the hatter, laid the foundation of his fortune" with that purchase. Throughout the country, men and women took off their hats to check whether they were wearing "a Genin".

When the Hungarian patriot Louis Kossuth came to New York City in 1851, Genin again seized the moment. He met Kossuth's ship off Sandy Hook, and gave him and his followers hats from his "dead stock", with black feathers added, for them to wear as they paraded up Broadway. Genin, as soon as the parade was over, briskly sold the rest of his "dead stock".

In 1852, when Amelia Bloomer needed a hat to go with the Bloomer-pants outfit she had designed, she turned to Genin, who produced the first round hat for fashionable young women, giving them an alternative to the bonnet.

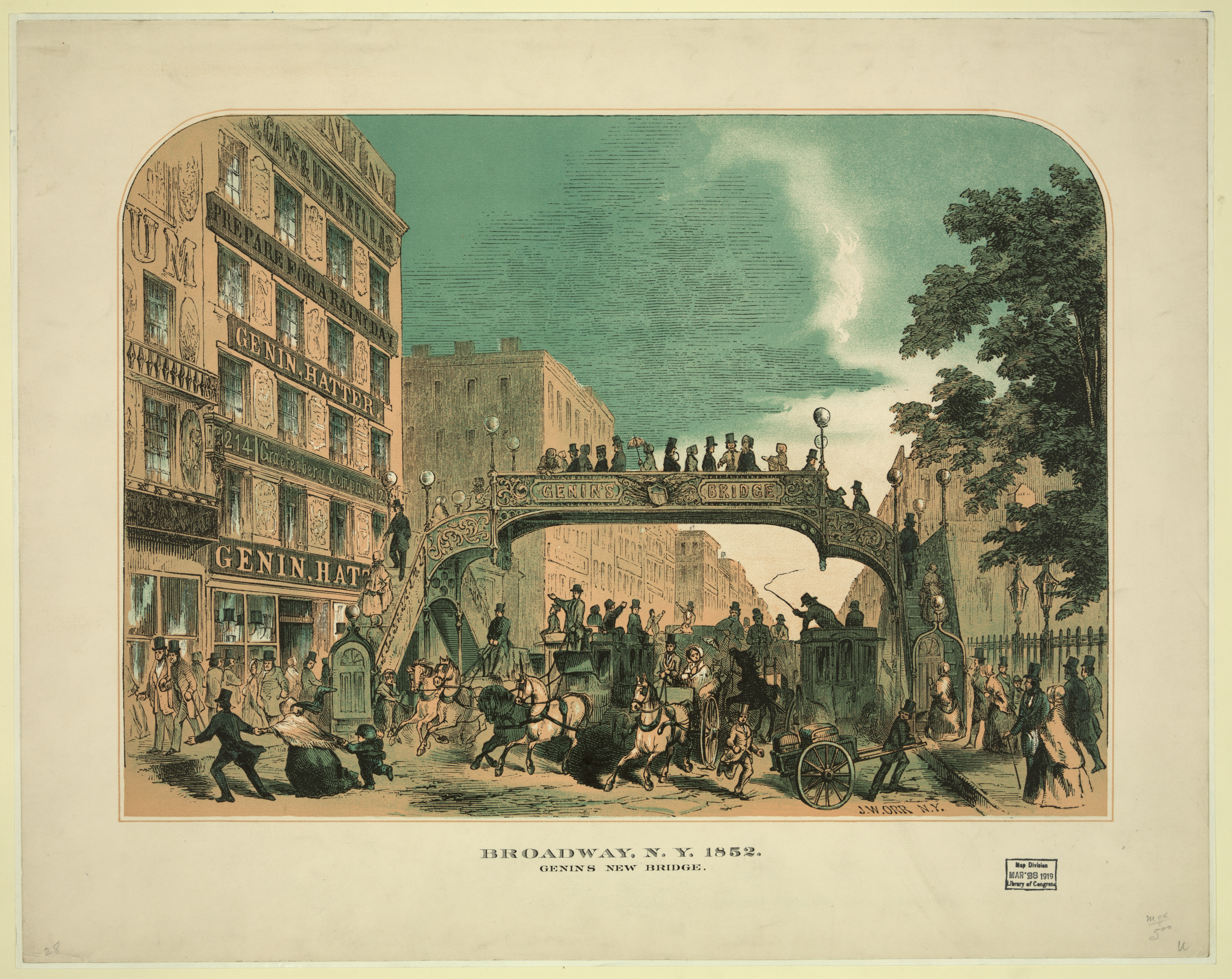
A proposed design for Genin's bridge across Broadway. Wood engraving by J. W. Orr.

When public officials, in 1854, ignored public demands for cleaner streets, Genin took the bull by the horns, and hired, at his own expense, one hundred men and carts to do the work. For this act he was offered the nomination for mayor, but declined the honor, preferring to remain in the hat business.

But John Genin's greatest scheme was a pedestrian bridge across Broadway. From the late 1830s to the early 1860s, New York City's fashionable shopping area was on Broadway, near City Hall. That area, particularly where Park Row met Broadway, was a traffic nightmare, and only the most adventurous pedestrians even tried to cross the street there. One wag claimed that it took "more skill to cross Broadway than to cross the Atlantic in a clamboat". Things got so bad that a special squad of policeman was detailed to help shoppers get from one side of Broadway to the other.
