= Christopher Orr =

Christopher Orr or Chris Orr may refer to:

- Chris Orr (artist) (born 1943), English artist
- Chris Orr (American football) (born 1997), American football linebacker
- Christopher Orr, American actor who appeared in D3: The Mighty Ducks
- Christopher Orr (artist) (born 1967), Scottish painter
- Christopher Orr (film critic) (born 1967), American film critic
- Chris Orr (rugby league) (born 1973), rugby league footballer
- Christopher Orr (skier) (fl. 1984), New Zealand Paralympian
