= Walter Forward =

American lawyer and politician

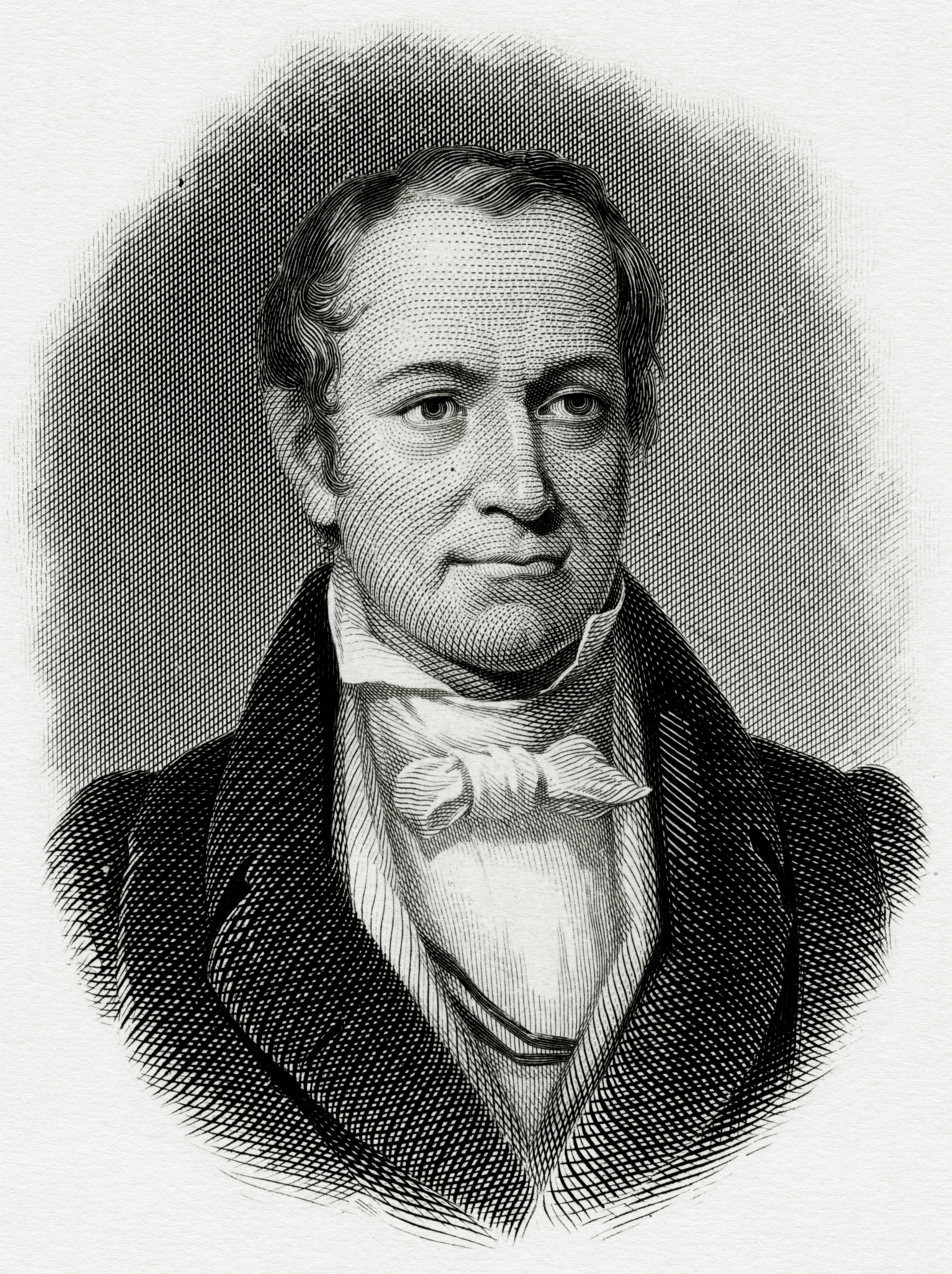
- Bureau of Engraving and Printing portrait of Forward as Secretary of the Treasury

United States Minister to Denmark
- In office June 15, 1850 – September 10, 1851
- President: Zachary Taylor; Millard Fillmore
- Preceded by: Robert Flenniken
- Succeeded by: Miller Grieve

15th United States Secretary of the Treasury
- In office September 13, 1841 – March 1, 1843
- President: John Tyler
- Preceded by: Thomas Ewing
- Succeeded by: John Spencer

1st Comptroller of the Treasury
- In office March 6, 1841 – September 13, 1841
- President: William Henry Harrison; John Tyler

Member of the U.S. House of Representatives from Pennsylvania
- In office October 8, 1822 – March 3, 1825
- Preceded by: Henry Baldwin
- Succeeded by: James S. Stevenson
- Constituency: 14th district (1822–1823); 16th district Seat B (1823–1825)

Personal details
- Born: January 24, 1786 East Granby, Connecticut, U.S.
- Died: November 24, 1852 (aged 66) Pittsburgh, Pennsylvania, U.S.
- Party: Democratic-Republican (before 1825); Whig (1834–1852)
- Spouse: Henrietta Barclay
- Relations: Oliver Forward (brother); Chauncey Forward (brother)

Walter Forward (January 24, 1786 – November 24, 1852) was an American lawyer and politician. He was the brother of Chauncey Forward and Oliver Forward.

== Biography ==
Born in East Granby, Connecticut, he attended the common schools. After moving with his father to Aurora, Ohio, he settled in Pittsburgh, Pennsylvania in 1803. There he studied law and was admitted to the bar in 1806. He practiced in Pittsburgh and also served for more than a year as editor of The Tree of Liberty newspaper. He also served in the Pennsylvania General Assembly.

In 1822, he was elected to the 17th Congress to fill the vacancy caused by the resignation of Henry Baldwin, and was reelected to the 18th Congress. He was an unsuccessful candidate for reelection in 1824 to the 19th Congress. He was a member of the Pennsylvania constitutional convention in 1837 and played an important role in the establishment of the United States Whig Party in the 1830s.

Forward was an active supporter of the Harrison-Tyler ticket in the U.S. presidential election, 1840. As a reward, Forward was offered the office of United States Attorney for the Western District of Pennsylvania. He declined that appointment but on March 6, 1841 was appointed by President William Henry Harrison to be First Comptroller of the Treasury. He served in that post until September 13, 1841, when he was appointed 15th U.S. Secretary of the Treasury by President John Tyler.

During his tenure as Treasury Secretary, the Independent Treasury System of 1840 was abolished, and the government's funds were deposited once more with commercial banks. Soon after Forward took office, he was asked by Millard Fillmore, then chairman of the U.S. House Ways and Means Committee, to devise a plan to increase the tariff, in response to the serious decrease in revenue caused by the Panic of 1837. He was also asked to develop plans for a "Board of Exchequer" to receive and disburse customs revenue, since the Independent Treasury System was no longer in effect. In August 1842 a strongly protective tariff was passed. Since constant friction with the new President marred his entire tenure as Secretary of the Treasury, he left Tyler's cabinet on February 28, 1843 with his letter of resignation being forwarded that day.

After leaving his Cabinet post, Forward resumed the practice of law in Pittsburgh until 1849, when he was appointed Chargé d'Affaires to Denmark by President Zachary Taylor. He returned from Denmark in 1851 to serve as presiding judge of the district court of Allegheny County. He died in Pittsburgh and is interred in Allegheny Cemetery.

== Honors ==
Forward Township in Allegheny County is named for Walter Forward, as is the Coast Guard Cutter USCGC Forward (WMEC-911).

U.S. House of Representatives
Preceded by Henry Baldwin	Member of the U.S. House of Representatives from Pennsylvania's 14th congressional district 1822–1823	Succeeded by Andrew Stewart
Preceded by District created	Member of the U.S. House of Representatives from Pennsylvania's 16th congressional district 1823–1825 alongside: James Allison, Jr.	Succeeded by James S. Stevenson and Robert Orr, Jr.
Political offices
Preceded by Thomas Ewing, Sr.	U.S. Secretary of the Treasury; Served under: John Tyler; 1841–1843	Succeeded by John C. Spencer
Diplomatic posts
Preceded by Robert P. Flenniken	U.S. Ambassador to Denmark; 1850–1851; As Chargé d'Affaires	Succeeded by Andrew J. Ogle
