= James Orr =

James Orr may refer to:

- James Orr (Canadian politician) (1826–1905), Member of the Legislative Assembly of British Columbia for the riding of New Westminster
- James Orr (courtier) (1917–2008), private secretary to the Duke of Edinburgh
- James Orr (filmmaker) (born 1953), Canadian screenwriter, film director and producer
- James Orr (footballer) (1871–1942), Scottish footballer
- James Orr (poet) (1770–1816), poet from Ulster
- James Orr (theologian) (1844–1913), Scottish theological writer, editor of ISBE, 1915
- James Orr (umpire) (1868–1940), Australian test cricket umpire
- Jimmy Orr (1935–2020), American football wide receiver
- J. Edwin Orr (1912–1987), Baptist minister, lecturer and author
- James Lawrence Orr (1822–1873), American politician of South Carolina
- James Orr (philosopher) (born 1978), British right-wing academic and political activist
