= Orr =

Orr or ORR may also refer to:

== Acronyms ==
- Objective response rate, or overall response rate, a parameter in clinical trials for pharmaceutical products
- Office of Rail and Road, a regulatory body in the United Kingdom
- Office of Refugee Resettlement, a program of the US Administration for Children and Families
- Operational Readiness Review (ORR), used by the US government
- Open-road racing, mostly on closed down public roads in sparsely populated areas of the Southern US
- Orchestre Révolutionnaire et Romantique, a British classical orchestra
- Outer Ring Road (disambiguation), a series of roads in various places
- Oxygen reduction reaction, a type of chemical reaction

== Places ==
- Orr, Kentucky, United States, an unincorporated community
- Orr, Minnesota, United States, a small city
- Orr, West Virginia, United States, an unincorporated community
- Orr, a district of Pulheim, Germany
- Orr Glacier, Victoria Land, Antarctica
- Orr Island, Marie Byrd Land, Antarctica
- Orr Peak, Ross Dependency, Antarctica
- Urr Water, Scotland, United Kingdom, archaically known as the River Orr
- Orr Formation, a geologic formation in Utah, United States

== People ==
- Orr (surname), including a list of people with this name
- Orr Barouch (born 1991), Israeli footballer

== Fictional characters ==
- Orr (Catch-22), a fictional character in the novel Catch-22 and the film adaptation
- George Orr, protagonist of the science-fiction novel The Lathe of Heaven by Ursula K. Le Guin and two film adaptations

== Other uses ==
- Oldham-Ramona-Rutland School District 39-6
- Orr Academy High School, a public high school in Chicago, Illinois, United States
- Orr School, Texarkana, Arkansas, United States, on the National Register of Historic Places
- Yorketown Airport, IATA airport code "ORR"

== See also ==
- Ore (disambiguation)
- Orr-Ewing Baronets
- Orr's Island, Maine, United States
