= List of United States senators in the 19th Congress =

This is a complete list of United States senators during the 19th United States Congress listed by seniority from March 4, 1825, to March 3, 1827.

Order of service is based on the commencement of the senator's first term. Behind this is former service as a senator (only giving the senator seniority within their new incoming class), service as vice president, a House member, a cabinet secretary, or a governor of a state. The final factor is the population of the senator's state.

Senators who were sworn in during the middle of the two-year congressional term (up until the last senator who was not sworn in early after winning the November 1826 election) are listed at the end of the list with no number.

== Terms of service ==
Class	Terms of service of senators that expired in years
Class 1	Terms of service of senators that expired in 1827 (CT, DE, IN, MA, MD, ME, MO, MS, NJ, NY, OH, PA, RI, TN, VA, and VT.)
Class 2	Terms of service of senators that expired in 1829 (AL, DE, GA, IL, KY, LA, MA, ME, MS, NC, NH, NJ, RI, SC, and VA.)
Class 3	Terms of service of senators that expired in 1831 (AL, CT, GA, IL, IN, KY, LA, MD, MO, NC, NH, NY, OH, PA, SC, TN, and VT.)

== U.S. Senate seniority list ==
U.S. Senate seniority
Rank	Senator (party-state)	Seniority date	Other factors
1	John Gaillard (J-SC)	December 6, 1804	
2	James Barbour (DR-VA)	January 2, 1815	
3	Benjamin Ruggles (AJ-OH)	March 4, 1815	
4	Nathaniel Macon (J-NC)	December 5, 1815	
5	James Noble (AJ-IN)	December 11, 1816	
6	Nicholas Van Dyke (AJ-DE)	March 4, 1817	Former representative
7	Mahlon Dickerson (J-NJ)	March 4, 1817	
8	Thomas Hill Williams (J-MS)	December 10, 1817	
9	Jesse Burgess Thomas (AJ-IL)	December 3, 1818	
10	Edward Lloyd (J-MD)	March 4, 1819	
11	Richard Mentor Johnson (J-KY)	December 10, 1819	
12	William Rufus de Vane King (J-AL)	December 14, 1819	
13	Elijah Hunt Mills (AJ-MA)	June 12, 1820	
14	John Holmes (DR-ME)	June 13, 1820	
15	John Chandler (J-ME)	June 14, 1820	
16	David Holmes (J-MS)	August 30, 1820	
17	Nehemiah Rice Knight (AJ-RI)	January 9, 1821	
18	Martin Van Buren (J-NY)	March 4, 1821	New York 1st in population (1810)
19	Horatio Seymour (AJ-VT)	March 4, 1821	Vermont 15th in population (1810)
20	James De Wolf (DR-RI)	March 4, 1821	Rhode Island 17th in population (1810)
21	David Barton (AJ-MO)	August 10, 1821	Alphabetical (Ba)
22	Thomas Hart Benton (J-MO)	August 10, 1821	Alphabetical (Be)
23	John Henry Eaton (J-TN)	September 27, 1821	
24	William Findlay (J-PA)	December 10, 1821	
25	James Lloyd (AJ-MA)	June 5, 1822	
26	Samuel Smith (J-MD)	December 17, 1822	
27	Andrew Jackson (J-TN)	March 4, 1823	Former senator
28	John Branch (DR-NC)	March 4, 1823	Former governor; North Carolina 4th in population (1820)
29	Samuel Bell (AJ-NH)	March 4, 1823	Former governor; New Hampshire 15th in population (1820)
30	Robert Young Hayne (J-NH)	March 4, 1823	
31	Henry Waggaman Edwards (J-CT)	October 8, 1823	
32	Joseph McIlvaine (AJ-NJ)	November 12, 1823	
33	Thomas Clayton (AJ-DE)	January 8, 1824	
34	Josiah Stoddard Johnston (AJ-LA)	January 15, 1824	
35	Charles Dominique Joseph Bouligny (AJ-LA)	November 19, 1824	
36	Thomas Willis Cobb (DR-GA)	December 6, 1824	
37	Littleton Waller Tazewell (J-VA)	December 7, 1824	
38	Dudley Chase (AJ-VT)	March 4, 1825	Former senator
39	William Hendricks (AJ-IN)	March 4, 1825	Former representative (5 years)
40	William Henry Harrison (AJ-OH)	March 4, 1825	Former representative (3 years)
41	John Rowan (J-KY)	March 4, 1825	Former representative (2 years)
42	William Marks (AJ-PA)	March 4, 1825	Pennsylvania 2nd in population (1820)
43	John Macpherson Berrien (J-GA)	March 4, 1825	Georgia 11th in population (1820)
44	Henry H. Chambers (J-AL)	March 4, 1825	Alabama 19th in population (1820)
45	Elias Kent Kane (J-IL)	March 4, 1825	Illinois 24th in population (1820)
46	Levi Woodbury (J-NH)	March 16, 1825	
47	Calvin Willey (J-CT)	May 4, 1825	
	Powhatan Ellis (J-MS)	September 28, 1825	
	Hugh Lawson White (J-TN)	October 28, 1825	
	Ashur Robbins (AJ-RI)	October 31, 1825	
	John Randolph (J-VA)	December 26, 1825	
48	Nathan Sanford (AJ-NY)	January 14, 1826	
	Ezekiel Forman Chambers (AJ-VA)	January 24, 1826	
	Thomas Buck Reed (J-MS)	January 28, 1826	
	Israel Pickens (J-AL)	February 17, 1826	
	William Harper (J-SC)	March 8, 1826	
	Nathaniel Silsbee (AJ-MA)	May 31, 1826	
	Daniel Rodney (AJ-DE)	May 31, 1826	
	Ephraim Bateman (AJ-NJ)	November 10, 1826	
	John McKinley (J-AL)	November 27, 1826	
	William Smith (DR-SC)	November 29, 1826	
	Henry Moore Ridgely (J-DE)	January 12, 1827	

== See also ==
- 19th United States Congress
- List of United States representatives in the 19th Congress
