= Senator Orr =

Senator Orr may refer to:

- Alexander D. Orr (1761–1835), Virginia State Senate
- Arthur Orr (born 1964), Alabama State Senate
- Charles N. Orr (1877–1949), Minnesota State Senate
- James Lawrence Orr (1822–1873), Confederate States Senator from South Carolina from 1862 to 1865
- Robert D. Orr (1917–2004), Indiana State Senate
- Robert Orr Jr. (1786–1876), Pennsylvania State Senate
