= Judge Orr =

Judge Orr may refer to:

- Charles Prentiss Orr (1858–1922), judge of the United States District Court for the Western District of Pennsylvania
- William Edwin Orr (1881–1965), judge of the United States Court of Appeals for the Ninth Circuit

== See also ==
- Justice Orr (disambiguation)
