= Justice Orr =

Justice Orr may refer to:

- Alan Stewart Orr (1911–1991), British Lord Justice, called Mr Justice Orr in the High Court
- Robert F. Orr (born 1946), associate justice of the North Carolina Supreme Court
- Warren H. Orr (1888–1962), chief justice of the Illinois Supreme Court
- William Edwin Orr (1881–1965), associate justice of the Nevada Supreme Court

== See also ==
- Judge Orr (disambiguation)
