= J. M. A. Lenihan =

British clinical physicist, and science author (1918–1993)

John Mark Anthony Lenihan FRSE FIP PRPSG OBE (1918–1993) was a British clinical physicist, and science author.

== Life ==
He was born in Carlisle on 23 June 1918. He was educated at Heaton Secondary School in County Durham. He studied at King's College of Durham University, graduating BSc in 1938.

In the Second World War he served as an officer in the Royal Corps of Signals.

In 1945 he began lecturing in Natural Philosophy (Physics) at Glasgow University. The university gave him a doctorate (PhD) in 1949. In 1948 he became the Physicist at the Western Infirmary in Glasgow. In 1953 he was promoted to Regional Physicist for Western Scotland and held this role until retiring in 1983. He employed John Stewart Orr as his senior Physicist, working on radioactive isotopes and doing early research on MRI technology. For the same period he was Science Correspondent for the Glasgow Herald newspaper.

In 1967 he was elected a Fellow of the Royal Society of Edinburgh. His proposers were Anthony Elliot Ritchie, John Currie Gunn, George A P Wyllie and Arthur F. Brown. He was also President of the Royal Philosophical society of Glasgow.

He died on 27 December 1993.

== Publications ==
- Atomic Energy and its Applications (1954)
- Human Engineering: The Body Re-Examined (1975)
- Built Environment (Environment and Man) (1978)
- Measuring and Monitoring the Environment (1978)
- The Crumbs of Creation (1988)
- The Research Reactor as a Window on the World
