= James Allison Jr. =

American politician (1772–1854)

Member of the U.S. House of Representatives from Pennsylvania's 16th district
- In office March 4, 1823 – August 26, 1825
- Preceded by: District created
- Succeeded by: James S. Stevenson, Robert Orr Jr.

Personal details
- Born: October 4, 1772 Elkton, Province of Maryland, British America
- Died: June 17, 1854 (aged 81) Beaver, Pennsylvania, U.S.
- Resting place: Old Cemetery
- Party: Jacksonian Democratic-Republican

James Allison Jr. (October 4, 1772 – June 17, 1854) was an American lawyer and politician who served two terms as a member of the U.S. House of Representatives from Pennsylvania from 1823 to 1825.

== Biography ==
James Allison Jr. (father of John Allison) was born near Elkton, Maryland. He moved with his parents to Washington County, Pennsylvania, in 1774. At seventeen years of age, he enrolled in the school of David Johnson of Beaver, Pennsylvania.

He saw service in the Indian warfare at Yellow Creek. He studied law, was admitted to the bar in 1796, and commenced practice in Washington, Pennsylvania. He returned to Beaver in 1803 and continued the practice of law until 1822, when he was elected to Congress. He served as prosecuting attorney of Beaver County, Pennsylvania, from 1803 to 1809.

== Congress ==
Allison was elected as a Jackson Republican to the Eighteenth and a Jacksonian to the Nineteenth Congresses and served until his resignation on August 26, 1825 before the assembling of the Nineteenth Congress.

== Later career and death ==
He resumed the practice of law until 1848, after which he discontinued active pursuits and lived in retirement until his death in Beaver in 1854. He was interred in Old Cemetery.

U.S. House of Representatives
Preceded by District created	Member of the U.S. House of Representatives from Pennsylvania's 16th congressional district 1823–1825 alongside Walter Forward	Succeeded by James S. Stevenson; Robert Orr Jr.
