= Christopher Orr (artist) =

British painter

Christopher Orr is an artist. He was born in 1967 in Helensburgh, Scotland.

In 2005 Orr, along with Stephen Farthing, co-ordinated the Royal Academy Summer Exhibition at the Royal Academy of Arts, London.

His work was included in the Tate Triennial in 2006.
