= James S. Stevenson =

American politician

James S. Stevenson (1780 – October 16, 1831) was a Jacksonian member of the U.S. House of Representatives from Pennsylvania.

James S. Stevenson was born in York County, Pennsylvania. He studied law, was admitted to the bar and practiced. He was a member of the Pennsylvania House of Representatives in 1822 and 1823. He was president of the board of canal commissioners of the state, which position he held until the time of his death.

Stevenson was elected as a Jacksonian to the Nineteenth and Twentieth Congresses. He was an unsuccessful candidate for reelection in 1828 to the Twenty-first Congress. He was engaged in manufacturing in Pittsburgh, Pennsylvania, until his death in 1831. Interment in First Presbyterian Cemetery.

== Sources ==
- United States Congress. "James S. Stevenson (id: S000892)". Biographical Directory of the United States Congress.
- The Political Graveyard

U.S. House of Representatives
Preceded by Walter Forward; James Allison, Jr.	Member of the U.S. House of Representatives from Pennsylvania's 16th congressional district 1825–1829 alongside : Robert Orr, Jr.	Succeeded by William Wilkins; John Gilmore
