= John Stewart Orr =

Scottish medical physicist and researcher

John Stewart Orr FRSE FIP (d. 2001) was a 20th-century Scottish medical physicist and researcher. He was the creator of Orr's Spherule, a scientific teaching tool.

== Life ==
He was born at 34 Gray Street in Glasgow on 10 August 1930, the second son of Neil Orr, a lawyer. The family lived most of their life in Milngavie.

He was educated at the Atholl Preparatory School in Milngavie and Glasgow High School then studied Physics at Glasgow University graduating BSc. Although too young to serve in the war he served two years National Service in the late 1940s. For a while he worked with Barr and Stroud in Glasgow making specialist scientific instruments. Here he worked on developing missile guidance systems and on ultrasound instruments for medical use.

He worked as a medical physicist for the West of Scotland Health Board being promoted to Senior Physicist in 1960 by Prof Lenihan. He concurrently worked at Glasgow's Western Infirmary and later in the Belvidere Hospital. His work included development of radiation treatment for cancer and use of radioactive isotopes, working with others such as Prof Tony Nias. In 1971 his alma mater awarded him an honorary doctorate (DSc). He did much to develop MRI technology. In 1977 became Professor of Medical Physics at the Royal Postgraduate Medical School in Hammersmith in London.

In 1976 he was elected a Fellow of the Royal Society of Edinburgh. His proposers were J. M. A. Lenihan, John Greening, John Paul and John R. Anderson.

He died on 21 October 2001.

== Family ==
He was married to Jean Williamson. They had one daughter and three sons.
