= Hugh Orr (inventor) =

American politician

- Born: January 2, 1715; Lochwinnoch, Renfrewshire, Scotland
- Died: December 6, 1798 (aged 83); Bridgewater, Massachusetts, United States
- Occupations: Toolmaker, gunsmith, inventor, legislator
- Known for: Introducing cannon manufacturing techniques during the American Revolutionary War; pioneering textile machinery in America
- Spouse: Mary Bass (m. 1742)
- Children: 10, including Robert Orr Jr.

Hugh Orr (2 January 1715 – 6 December 1798) was a Scottish-born toolmaker, gunsmith and inventor in Massachusetts. He introduced to America new methods of manufacturing cannons during the Revolutionary War, and later of processing cotton.

== Early life and career ==
Orr was the son of Robert Orr of Lochwinnoch, Renfrewshire, and he was brought up in the trade of a gunsmith and locksmith. He emigrated to America, arriving in Boston, Massachusetts in 1737; he and two other emigrants from Lochwinnoch set up a blacksmith's shop in Easton, Massachusetts.

In June 1740 he settled at Bridgewater in Massachusetts, which was already notable for iron-manufacturing. Here he manufactured scythes and edge-tools, setting up the first trip hammer to be constructed in Massachusetts. Through him the manufacture of edge-tools spread through Massachusetts, Rhode Island, and Connecticut.

In 1748 he made five hundred muskets for the province of Massachusetts Bay, believed to have been the first weapons of the kind produced in the country.

During the American Revolutionary War, Orr and a French business partner built a foundry to cast iron and brass cannon and cannon-balls. They made cannons using a new method introduced from Europe: instead of casting the cannon with a cylindrical cavity which was later refined, the gun was cast solid and the gun barrel was then drilled. This produced a more reliable and accurate cannon.

== After the war ==
After the war he was a senator for Plymouth County in the Massachusetts legislature for several years. Interested in the new cotton processing machinery in use in Britain, he set up in 1786 with Scottish brothers Robert and Alexander Barr carding, roving and spinning machinery; these are thought to be the first such machines in America. Made with the help of a grant from the Massachusetts legislature and known as the "state models", Orr encouraged copies to be made. He also established a business marketing flax seed, and invented a machine for cleaning flax seed.

Orr died in Bridgewater on 6 December 1798.

== Family ==
In 1742 he married Mary Bass; they had ten children. Their son Robert Orr was a colonel in the Anglo-American War and was armorer of the United States arsenal at Springfield, Massachusetts.
