= John Orr (scholar of French) =

English-born Scottish-Australian scholar and translator

John Orr, FBA (4 June 1885 – 10 August 1966) was an English-born Scottish-Australian scholar of French language and philology, and a translator of French literature.

== Early life and education ==
Orr was born in 1885 in Cumberland to Scottish parents. When he was still a boy, the family migrated to Tasmania, where he attended Launceston High School and the University of Tasmania (he read classics at the latter). He won a Rhodes Scholarship to study at Balliol College, Oxford, beginning in 1905. He initially studied classics, switching to law for his finals, which he sat in 1909. A period of ill health led him to France and Switzerland for recuperation; there, he met his future wife, Augusta Berthe Brisac, and also developed an interest in French language and literature. In 1911, he was awarded his licence ès lettres by the University of Paris. He completed the BLitt at the University of Oxford in 1913.

== Academic career, research and honours ==
In 1913, Orr was appointed assistant lecturer in French at the Victoria University of Manchester. In 1915, he moved to the East London College in the University of London. His academic career was interrupted by service in the First World War from 1916 to 1918 when he was an officer working in intelligence. On his demobilisation, he was appointed Professor of French Literature at the University of Manchester (in 1919). He also served as dean of the faculty of arts from 1924 to 1926, and pro-vice-chancellor from 1931 to 1933. In 1933, he moved to the University of Edinburgh to be Professor of French; in 1951, his chair was divided and he became Professor of French Language and Romance Philology; he retired in 1955, having served as dean of the faculty of arts from 1951 to 1954.

Among Orr's major works on linguistics were Words and Sounds in English and French (2 vols., 1953), Old French and Modern English Idiom (1962), and Essais d'Etymologie et de Philologie Français (1963); he also translated works from French to English, including Eustache d'Amiens' Boucher d'Abbeville (1947), Jehan Renart's Lai de l'Ombre (1948) and Jules Supervielle's Contes et Poems (1950). He served as president of the Modern Humanities Research Association in 1954 and of The International Federation for Modern Languages and Literatures from 1963 to 1966; he was Romance editor for the Modern Language Review from 1948 to 1958, and was among the founders of French Studies. Orr was the subject of a Festschrift: Studies in Romance Philology and French Literature Presented to John Orr by Pupils, Colleagues and Friends (1953). He was elected a fellow of the British Academy in 1952 and was awarded three honorary doctorates. He was a Commander of the French Legion of Honour and a Knight Commander of the Spanish Civil Order of Alfonso X, the Wise. He died in 1966; his wife and their only child had predeceased him.
