= James Orr (footballer) =

Scottish footballer

Personal information
- Date of birth: 24 July 1871
- Place of birth: Dalry, Scotland
- Date of death: 2 October 1942 (aged 71)
- Place of death: Kilmaurs, Scotland
- Position: Full back

Senior career*
Years	Team	Apps	(Gls)
- Kilmarnock Athletic
1889–1891	Rosebank		
1891–1892	Kilmarnock		
1892–1895	Darwen		
1895–1898	Celtic	10	(0)
1898–1899	Kilmarnock Athletic		
1899–1900	Galston		

International career
1892	Scotland	1	(0)
- * Club domestic league appearances and goals

James Orr (24 July 1871 – 2 October 1942) was a Scottish footballer who played as a full back.

== Career ==
Born in Dalry, Orr played club football for Kilmarnock, Darwen, Celtic, Kilmarnock Athletic and Galston, and made one appearance for Scotland in 1892.
