= Robert Orr Jr. =

American politician

Member of the United States House of Representatives from Pennsylvania
- In office October 11, 1825 – March 3, 1829
- Preceded by: James Allison Jr.

Member of the Pennsylvania Senate
- In office 1821–1825

Member of the Pennsylvania House of Representatives
- In office 1817–1820

Personal details
- Born: March 5, 1786 Hannastown, Westmoreland County, Pennsylvania, Pennsylvania, U.S.
- Died: May 22, 1876 (aged 90) Kittanning, Pennsylvania, U.S.
- Resting place: Kittanning Cemetery
- Party: Jacksonian

Military service
- Allegiance: United States
- Branch/service: United States Army
- Rank: General
- Battles/wars: War of 1812

Robert Orr Jr. (March 5, 1786 – May 22, 1876) was a Pennsylvania political figure.

== Biography ==
Robert Orr Jr. was born on March 5, 1786, at Hannastown, Westmoreland County, Pennsylvania. Orr was the son of Hugh Orr, a Scottish-born gunsmith and politician. He attended the public schools in Westmoreland County and Armstrong County, Pennsylvania. He later moved to Kittanning, where he was elected to the post of Deputy Sheriff for Armstrong County in 1805. He studied surveying and was appointed deputy district surveyor.

Orr served in the War of 1812, where he rose to the rank of colonel in the US Army.

== Post-war political career ==
In 1816 Orr successfully ran for a seat in the Pennsylvania House of Representatives. He served two terms (1817–1820), after which he successfully ran for a seat in the Pennsylvania Senate. He served there from 1821 to 1825; he resigned before completing his term because he had been appointed as a Jacksonian member of the Nineteenth Congress U.S. House of Representatives to fill the vacancy caused by the resignation of James Allison Jr.

In 1826 Orr successfully ran for re-election, to the Twentieth Congress. He served in that capacity from October 11, 1825 to March 3, 1829.

== Military career ==
After the War of 1812 Orr retained his interest in military affairs. He eventually attained the rank of general.

== Later life ==
Orr resided for a short while in Orrsville in 1845, and lived in Allegheny City, Pennsylvania from 1848 to 1852. He returned to Kittanning, where he died in 1876. He was buried in the Kittanning Cemetery.

U.S. House of Representatives
Preceded by Walter Forward; James Allison Jr.	Member of the U.S. House of Representatives from Pennsylvania's 16th congressional district 1825–1829; Alongside : James S. Stevenson	Succeeded by William Wilkins; John Gilmore
