= Doug Orr =

Scottish footballer

Personal information
- Full name: Douglas McDonald Orr
- Date of birth: 8 November 1937 (age 88)
- Place of birth: Glasgow, Scotland
- Position: Outside left

Youth career
- Possilpark YMCA

Senior career*
Years	Team	Apps	(Gls)
1955–1956	Queen's Park	6	(2)
1956–1957	Hendon	6	(0)
1957	Queens Park Rangers	5	(0)
1958–1964	Queen's Park	24	(4)

International career
1956–1958	Scotland Amateurs	5	(4)

Managerial career
- 1987–1990: Hartford Hawks
- * Club domestic league appearances and goals

Douglas McDonald Orr (born 8 November 1937) was a Scottish amateur football outside left who played in the Scottish League for Queen's Park. He was capped by Scotland at amateur level and also played in the Athenian League for Hendon and the Football League for Queens Park Rangers. After his retirement as a player, he coached in college soccer in the United States with the Hartford Hawks.

== Career statistics ==
=== Player ===
Appearances and goals by club, season and competition
Club	Season	League			National Cup		League Cup		Other		Total	
Club	Season	Division	Apps	Goals	Apps	Goals	Apps	Goals	Apps	Goals	Apps	Goals
Queen's Park	1955–56	Scottish Second Division	6	2	0	0	2	0	1 (Note: Appearance in Glasgow Merchants Charity Cup)	0	9	2
Queen's Park	1956–57	Scottish First Division	0	0	―		3	1	2 (Note: Appearances in Glasgow Cup)	0	5	1
Queen's Park	Total		6	2	0	0	5	1	3	0	14	3
Hendon	1956–57	Athenian League	6	0	―		―		1 (Note: Appearance in Middlesex Senior Cup)	1	7	1
Queens Park Rangers	1957–58	Third Division South	5	0	0	0	0	0	0	0	5	0
Queen's Park	1958–59	Scottish Second Division	15	4	0	0	2	1	1	0	18	5
Queen's Park	1959–60	Scottish Second Division	2	0	0	0	0	0	0	0	2	0
Queen's Park	1960–61	Scottish Second Division	7	0	0	0	5	0	1	0	13	0
Queen's Park	Queen's Park total		30	6	0	0	10	2	5	0	45	8
Career total			41	6	0	0	10	2	6	1	57	9

=== Manager ===
Managerial record by team and tenure
Team	From	To	Record					Ref
Team	From	To	P	W	D	L	Win %	Ref
Hartford Hawks	1987	1990	84	38	35	11	45.2	
Total			84	38	35	11	45.2	—
