= J. W. Orr =

Irish-born American wood engraver (1815–1887)

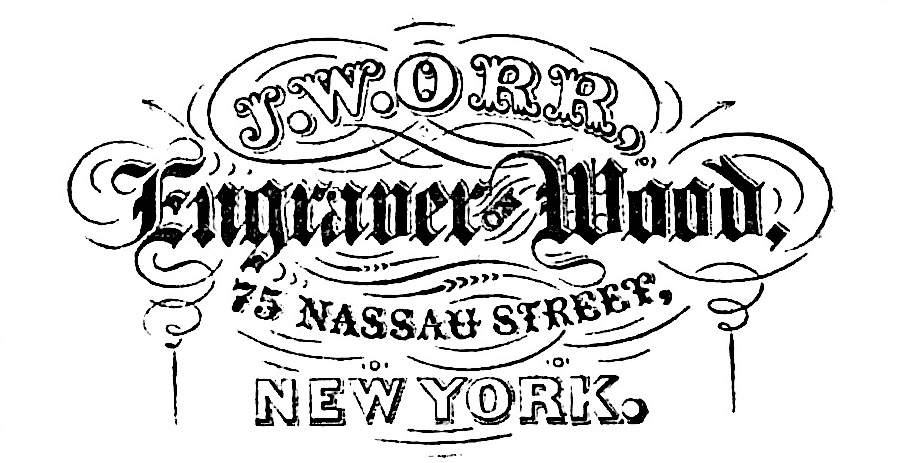
1847 newspaper advertisement

John William Orr (1815–1887) commonly known as J. W. Orr, was an Irish-born American wood engraver who drew many of his own illustrations and owned his own engraving and printing business.

== Biography ==
He was born in Ireland on March 31, 1815, and was brought to Buffalo, New York in his infancy. In 1836, he completed his instruction in drawing and engraving in New York City under the distinguished William Redfield. He returned to Buffalo, where he practiced wood-engraving and published several illustrated books, including Orr's Pictorial Guide to Niagara Falls (1842), for which he designed and engraved the illustrations. He went to Albany, New York in 1842 as artist and engraver for The Country Gentleman and while there was awarded a gold medal for the best engravings of animals. In 1844 he settled in New York City, where his first employment was on Harper Brothers' Illustrated Shakespeare. It was not long before he had his own business, a wood-engraving and printing establishment at 75 and 77 Nassau Street, New York. An advertisement of around 1857 states that he specialized in "illustrated catalogues and ornamental show cards", and manufactured "illuminated envelopes". He died in 1887.

His work includes rare illustrations of street life in New York City.

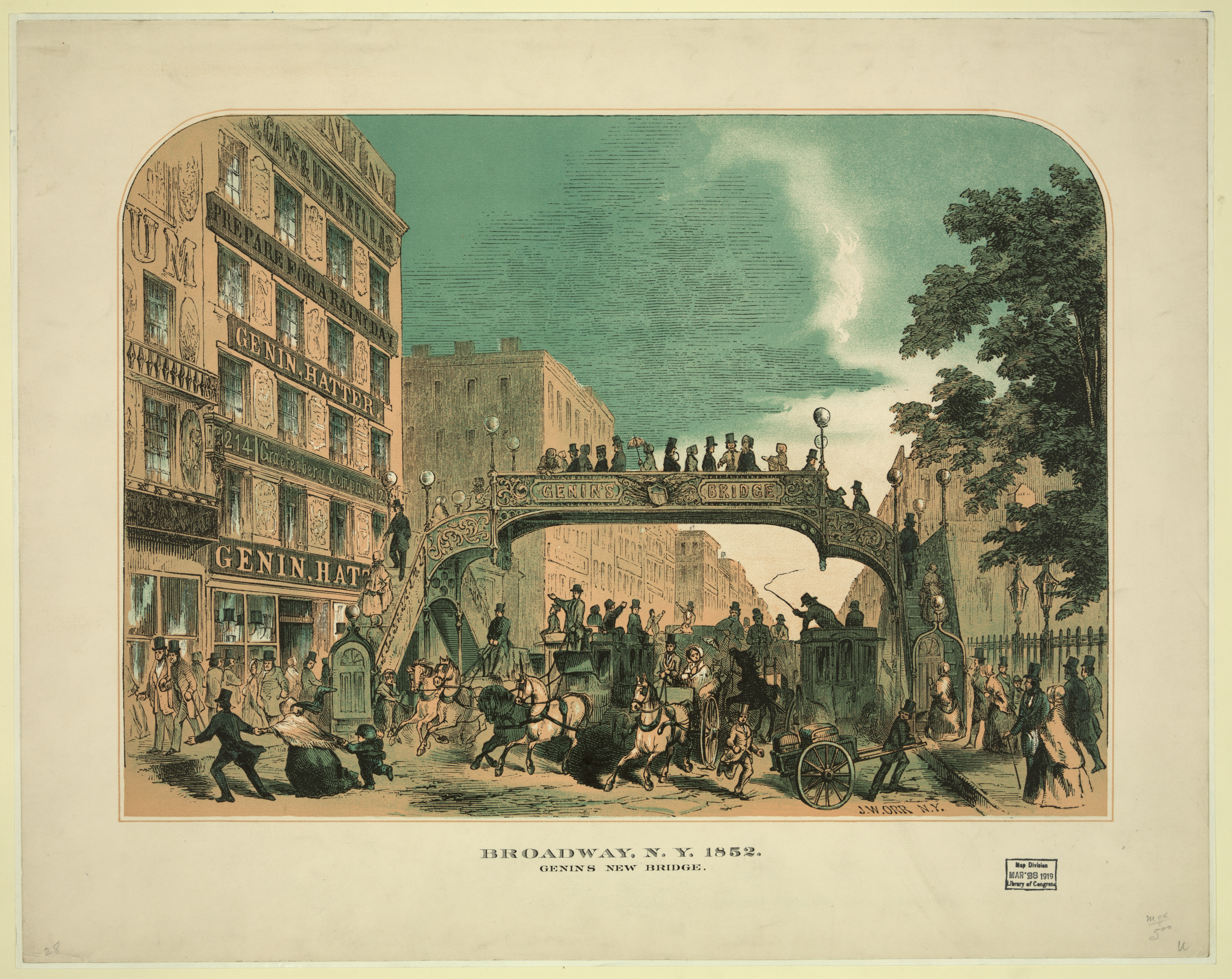
A proposed design for Genin's bridge across Broadway. Wood engraving by J. W. Orr.

His son, Louis Herbert Orr, was a successful typographer.
