= 1838–39 United States House of Representatives elections =

House elections for the 26th U.S. Congress

- July 2, 1838 – November 5, 1839

All 242 seats in the United States House of Representatives 122 seats needed for a majority
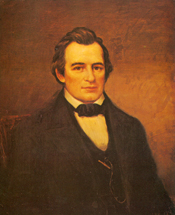

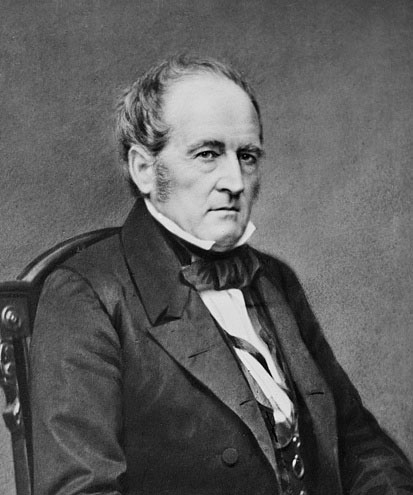
	Majority party	Minority party
Leader	John Jones	John Bell (Note: During the 1839 Speaker of the United States House of Representatives election, Bell withdrew his candidacy in favor of Robert M. T. Hunter, who was elected.)
Party	Democratic	Whig
Leader's seat	Virginia 3rd	Tennessee 7th
Last election	128 seats	100 seats
Seats won	125	109
Seat change	▼3	▲9
Popular vote	980,453	935,829
Percentage	50.04%	47.76%
Swing	▼0.55 pp	▲0.89 pp
	Third party	Fourth party
Party	Anti-Masonic	Conservative
Last election	7 seats	Pre-creation
Seats won	6	2
Seat change	▼1	▲2
Popular vote	31,511	4,614
Percentage	1.61%	0.24%
Swing	▼1.28 pp	New party
	Fifth party
Party	Independent
Last election	1 seat
Seats won	0
Seat change	▼1
Popular vote	2,751
Percentage	0.14%
Speaker before election
James K. Polk
Democratic
Elected Speaker
Robert M. T. Hunter
Whig

The 1838–39 United States House of Representatives elections were held on various dates in various states between July 2, 1838, and November 5, 1839. Each state set its own date for its elections to the House of Representatives before the first session of the 26th United States Congress convened on December 2, 1839. They occurred during President Martin Van Buren's term. Elections were held for all 242 seats, representing 26 states.

The Panic of 1837 and consequent economic downturn drove Whig Party gains. Van Buren's Democratic Party had lost popularity and the Whig policies of economic nationalism appealed to a larger number of voters. The Democrats were able, however, to contain the political fallout by blaming banks for the crisis. The Anti-Masonic Party, influential in New York, Pennsylvania, and other areas of the Northern United States, lost seats, while the Nullifier Party of the Southern United States disappeared. Two Virginia representatives were elected on that state's Conservative Party ticket.

Early business of the new House reflected the close partisan division. When Congress first Convened on December 3, 1839, two contingents of New Jersey representatives-elect, one composed of Democrats and the other of Whigs, arrived and both requested to be seated as members. Charging the Whigs with election fraud and facing loss of control of the House, the Democratic Party majority (119 to 118 Whigs from outside New Jersey) refused to seat all but one Whig. Massachusetts Representative John Quincy Adams presided as "chairman" of the House after the clerk lost control. Two weeks later, when voting for speaker of the House finally commenced, 11 ballots were needed before Robert M. T. Hunter, a compromise Whig candidate, was elected, receiving 119 votes (out of 232 cast). This congress also enacted the first Independent Treasury bill.

The results of the election in a seating chart.

== Election summaries ==
↓
125	8	109
Democratic	(Note: Anti-Masons won 6 elections and Conservatives won 2.)	Whig

State	Type	Date	Total seats	Democratic		Whig		Others	
State	Type	Date	Total seats	Seats	Change	Seats	Change	Seats	Change
Louisiana	Districts	July 2–4, 1838	3	0	▼1	3	▲1	0	Steady
Illinois	Districts	August 6, 1838	3	2	▼1	1	▲1	0	Steady
Missouri	At-large	August 6, 1838	2	2	Steady	0	Steady	0	Steady
Vermont	Districts	September 1, 1838	5	2	▲1	3	▼1	0	Steady
Maine	Districts	September 10, 1838	8	6	Steady	2	Steady	0	Steady
Arkansas	At-large	October 1, 1838	1	1	Steady	0	Steady	0	Steady
Georgia	At-large	October 1, 1838	9	0	▼8	9	▲8	0	Steady
New Jersey	At-large	October 8, 1838	6	5	▲5	1	▼5	0	Steady
South Carolina	Districts	October 8–9, 1838	9	8	▲6	1	Steady	0	▼6 (Note: Nullifiers)
Ohio	Districts	October 9, 1838	19	11	▲3	8	▼3	0	Steady
Pennsylvania	Districts (Note: Includes two plural districts, one with three members)	October 9, 1838	28	17	Steady	5	▲1	6 (Note: Anti-Masons)	▼1
Michigan	At-large	November 6, 1838	1	1	Steady	0	Steady	0	Steady
New York	Districts (Note: Includes five plural districts, one with four members)	November 5–7, 1838	40	19	▼11	21	▲11	0	Steady
Massachusetts	Districts	November 12, 1838	12	2	Steady	10	Steady	0	Steady
Delaware	At-large	November 13, 1838	1	1	▲1	0	▼1	0	Steady
New Hampshire	At-large	March 12, 1839	5	5	Steady	0	Steady	0	Steady
Connecticut	Districts	April 1, 1839	6	0	▼6	6	▲6	0	Steady
Virginia	Districts	May 23, 1839	21	12	▼3	7	▲1	2 (Note: Conservatives)	▲2
Kentucky	Districts	August 1, 1839	13	2	▲1	11	Steady	0	▼1 (Note: Independent joined Whigs)
Tennessee	Districts	August 1, 1839	13	6	▲3	7	▼3	0	Steady
Alabama	Districts	August 5, 1839	5	3	Steady	2	Steady	0	Steady
Indiana	Districts	August 5, 1839	7	5	▲4	2	▼4	0	Steady
North Carolina	Districts	August 8, 1839	13	8	▲3	5	▼3	0	Steady
Rhode Island	At-large	August 27, 1839	2	0	Steady	2	Steady	0	Steady
Maryland	Districts (Note: Includes 1 plural district)	October 3, 1839	8	5	▲1	3	▼1	0	Steady
Mississippi	At-large	November 4–5, 1839	2	2	▲2	0	▼2	0	Steady
Total			242	125 51.7%	▼3	109 45.0%	▲9	8 3.3%	▼6

Popular vote
Democratic	50.01%
Whig	49.73%
Others	0.26%

House seats
Democratic	52.07%
Whig	47.93%

== Special elections ==
There were special elections in 1838 and 1839 to the 25th United States Congress and 26th United States Congress.

Special elections are listed by date then district.

=== 25th Congress ===
District	Incumbent			This race	
District	Member	Party	First elected	Results	Candidates
Pennsylvania 9				New member elected March 8, 1838.	
Maine 3				New member elected April 28, 1838.	
Maine 5				New member elected May 29, 1838.	
Mississippi at-large 2 seats on a general ticket	John F. H. Claiborne	Democratic	1835	The House rescinded its former decision February 5, 1838 and declared the seats vacant. New members elected May 29, 1838. Two Whig gains. Successors seated May 30, 1838.	▌ ✓ Sergeant S. Prentiss (Whig) 26.55%; ▌ ✓ Thomas J. Word (Whig) 25.20%; ▌John F. H. Claiborne (Democratic) 24.57%; ▌Samuel J. Gholson (Democratic) 23.68%
Mississippi at-large 2 seats on a general ticket	Samuel J. Gholson	Democratic	1836 (special)	The House rescinded its former decision February 5, 1838 and declared the seats vacant. New members elected May 29, 1838. Two Whig gains. Successors seated May 30, 1838.	▌ ✓ Sergeant S. Prentiss (Whig) 26.55%; ▌ ✓ Thomas J. Word (Whig) 25.20%; ▌John F. H. Claiborne (Democratic) 24.57%; ▌Samuel J. Gholson (Democratic) 23.68%
Ohio 16				New member elected October 9, 1838.	
Ohio 19				New member elected November 5, 1838.	
Massachusetts 2	Stephen C. Phillips	Whig	1834 (special)	Incumbent resigned September 28, 1838 to become Mayor of Salem. New member elected November 12, 1838. Whig hold. Winner also elected to the next term; see below.	▌ ✓ Leverett Saltonstall (Whig) 59.15%; ▌Robert Rantoul Jr. (Democratic) 32.26%; ▌Joseph S. Cabot (Democratic) 8.60%

=== 26th Congress ===
District	Incumbent			This race	
District	Member	Party	First elected	Results	Candidates
Missouri at-large	Albert G. Harrison	Democratic	1835	New member elected October 28, 1839 and seated December 5, 1839. Democratic hold.	▌ ✓ John Jameson (Democratic) 63.16%; ▌Thorton Grimsley (Whig) 35.96%
Massachusetts 1	Richard Fletcher	Whig	1836	Incumbent member-elect declined to serve. New member elected November 11, 1839. Whig hold.	▌ ✓ Abbott Lawrence (Whig) 57.52%; ▌Bradford Sumner (Democratic) 42.48%
Pennsylvania 14				New member elected November 20, 1839.	
Massachusetts 6	James C. Alvord	Whig	1838	Incumbent died September 27, 1839. New member elected December 23, 1839. Whig hold.	First ballot (November 11, 1839): ▌Rodolphus Dickensen (Democratic) 48.99%; ▌Osmyn Baker (Whig) 44.48%; ▌Henry Chapman (Unknown) 4.58%; ▌Israel Billings (Anti-Slavery) 1.95%; Second ballot (December 23, 1839): ▌ ✓ Osmyn Baker (Whig) 51.09%; ▌Rodolphus Dickensen (Democratic) 39.98%; ▌Israel Billings (Anti-Slavery) 8.93%

== Arkansas ==
District	Incumbent			This race	
District	Member	Party	First elected	Results	Candidates
Arkansas at-large	Archibald Yell	Democratic	1836	Incumbent retired. Democratic hold.	▌ ✓ Edward Cross (Democratic) 61.0%; ▌William Cummins (Whig) 39.0%

== Connecticut ==
Connecticut elected its six members April 1, 1839, flipping all six seats from Democratic to Whig.

District	Incumbent			This race	
District	Member	Party	First elected	Results	Candidates
Connecticut 1	Isaac Toucey	Democratic	1835	Incumbent lost re-election. Whig gain.	▌ ✓ Joseph Trumbull (Whig) 53.3%; ▌Isaac Toucey (Democratic) 42.2%; ▌Charles Chapman (Unknown) 4.6%
Connecticut 2	Samuel Ingham	Democratic	1835	Incumbent lost re-election. Whig gain.	▌ ✓ William L. Storrs (Whig) 50.5%; ▌Samuel Ingham (Democratic) 49.2%
Connecticut 3	Elisha Haley	Democratic	1835	Incumbent retired. Whig gain.	▌ ✓ Thomas W. Williams (Whig) 50.4%; ▌Coolidge Billings (Democratic) 48.9%
Connecticut 4	Thomas T. Whittlesey	Democratic	1836 (special)	Incumbent lost re-election. Whig gain.	▌ ✓ Thomas B. Osborne (Whig) 52.2%; ▌Thomas T. Whittlesey (Democratic) 47.4%
Connecticut 5	Lancelot Phelps	Democratic	1835	Incumbent retired. Whig gain.	▌ ✓ Truman Smith (Whig) 53.4%; ▌Charles B. Phelps (Democratic) 46.4%
Connecticut 6	Orrin Holt	Democratic	1836 (special)	Incumbent retired. Whig gain.	▌ ✓ John H. Brockway (Whig) 52.4%; ▌Chauncey F. Cleveland (Democratic) 46.7%

== Florida Territory ==
See Non-voting delegates, below.

== Iowa Territory ==
See Non-voting delegates, below.

== Maine ==
District	Incumbent			This race	
District	Member	Party	First elected	Results	Candidates
Maine 1
Maine 2
Maine 3
Maine 4
Maine 5
Maine 6
Maine 7
Maine 8	Thomas Davee	Democratic	1836	Incumbent re-elected.	▌ ✓ Thomas Davee (Democratic) 51.90%; ▌John S. Tenney (Whig) 46.62%; ▌Samuel Farrar (Conservative) 1.48%

== Massachusetts ==
Elections were held November 12, 1838, but one district's election went to a fourth ballot in 1839, after the March 4, 1839 start of the term but before the House convened in December 1839.

District	Incumbent			This race	
District	Member	Party	First elected	Results	Candidates
Massachusetts 1	Richard Fletcher	Whig	1836	Incumbent re-elected, but declined to serve, leading to a special election.	▌ ✓ Richard Fletcher (Whig) 63.1%; ▌Bradford Sumner (Democratic) 36.2%
Massachusetts 2	Stephen C. Phillips	Whig	1834 (special)	Incumbent resigned September 28, 1838 to become Mayor of Salem. Whig hold. Successor also elected the same day to finish the current term.	▌ ✓ Leverett Saltonstall (Whig) 59.26%; ▌Robert Rantoul Jr. (Democratic) 32.33%; ▌Joseph S. Cabot (Democratic) 8.51%
Massachusetts 3	Caleb Cushing	Whig	1834	Incumbent re-elected.	▌ ✓ Caleb Cushing (Whig) 61.1%; ▌Gayton P. Osgood (Democratic) 35.0%
Massachusetts 4	William Parmenter	Democratic	1836	Incumbent re-elected late on the fourth ballot.	First ballot (November 12, 1838): ▌William Parmenter (Democratic) 49.24%; ▌Nathan Brooks (Whig) 48.24%; ▌James T. Woodbury (Democratic) 1.27%; ▌Amos Farnsworth (Anti-Slavery) 1.25%; Second ballot (December 17, 1838): ▌William Parmenter (Democratic) 47.23%; ▌Nathan Brooks (Whig) 45.59%; ▌Levi Farwell (Unknown) 3.18%; ▌James T. Woodbury (Democratic) 2.22%; ▌Amos Farnsworth (Anti-Slavery) 1.79%; Third ballot (February 4, 1839): ▌William Parmenter (Democratic) 49.92%; ▌Nathan Brooks (Whig) 42.24%; ▌Levi Farwell (Unknown) 4.1%; ▌James T. Woodbury (Democratic) 1.83%; Fourth ballot (April 1, 1839): ▌ ✓ William Parmenter (Democratic) 51.38%; ▌Nathan Brooks (Whig) 45.81%; ▌James T. Woodbury (Democratic) 1.83%
Massachusetts 5	Levi Lincoln Jr.	Whig	1834 (special)	Incumbent re-elected.	▌ ✓ Levi Lincoln Jr. (Whig) 55.2%; ▌Isaac Davis (Democratic) 34.1%; ▌Charles Allen (Unknown) 10.3%
Massachusetts 6	George Grennell Jr.	Whig	1834	Incumbent retired. Whig hold.	▌ ✓ James C. Alvord (Whig) 61.8%; ▌Thomas Nims (Democratic) 28.6%; ▌Osmyn Baker (Whig) 9.1%
Massachusetts 7	George N. Briggs	Whig	1830	Incumbent re-elected.	▌ ✓ George N. Briggs (Whig) 54.58%; ▌Henry W. Bishop (Democratic) 45.42%
Massachusetts 8	William Calhoun	Whig	1834	Incumbent re-elected.	▌ ✓ William Calhoun (Whig) 59.4%; ▌William W. Thompson (Democratic) 40.3%
Massachusetts 9	William S. Hastings	Whig	1836	Incumbent re-elected.	▌ ✓ William S. Hastings (Whig) 56.6%; ▌Alexander H. Everett (Democratic) 43.2%
Massachusetts 10	Nathaniel B. Borden	Democratic	1835	Incumbent lost re-election as a Whig. Democratic hold.	▌ ✓ Henry Williams (Democratic) 51.90%; ▌Nathaniel B. Borden (Whig) 45.84%; ▌William Baylies (Whig) 2.26%
Massachusetts 11	John Reed Jr.	Whig	1812; 1816 (lost); 1820	Incumbent re-elected.	▌ ✓ John Reed Jr. (Whig) 56.4%; ▌Henry Crocker (Democratic) 43.3%
Massachusetts 12	John Quincy Adams	Whig	1830	Incumbent re-elected.	▌ ✓ John Quincy Adams (Whig) 59.23%; ▌William M. Jackson (Democratic) 40.77%

== Michigan ==
District	Incumbent			This race	
District	Member	Party	First elected	Results	Candidates
Michigan at-large	Isaac E. Crary	Democratic	1835	Incumbent re-elected.	▌ ✓ Isaac E. Crary (Democratic) 50.3%; ▌Hezekiah Wells (Whig) 49.7%

== Mississippi ==
A special election was held in Mississippi on July 17–18, 1837. Its winners were Democrats John F. H. Claiborne and Samuel J. Gholson. The first session of the 25th Congress was a special session beginning on September 4, 1837, extending to October 16. In November, Mississippi held the regular election. Seargent Smith Prentiss, a Vicksburg lawyer and Whig, unexpectedly launched a vigorous, partisan campaign. He and fellow Whig Thomas J. Word won in an upset. Claiborne and Gholson then argued that the July result entitled them to serve full terms. With the Whig Party newly organizing, the closely divided House, in which Anti-Masons, Nullifiers, and the Independent tended to align more with Whigs and to oppose Democrats, agreed to hear Prentiss. He spoke for nine hours over three days, packing the gallery, drawing Senators, and earning a national reputation for oratory and public admiration from leading Whigs including Senators Clay and Webster. The Elections Committee then required a third election. Scheduled for April 1838, it confirmed the November result. Both Whigs were seated in May late in the second session, also serving for the third session.

District	Incumbent			This race	
District	Member	Party	First elected	Results	Candidates
Mississippi at-large (2 seats)	Seargent S. Prentiss	Whig	1837	Incumbent retired. Democratic gain.	▌ ✓ Albert G. Brown (Democratic) 27.17%; ▌ ✓ Jacob Thompson (Democratic) 26.89%; ▌Adam L. Benjamin (Whig) 23.68%; ▌Reuben Davis (Whig) 22.26%
Mississippi at-large (2 seats)	Thomas J. Word	Whig	1837	Incumbent retired. Democratic gain.	▌ ✓ Albert G. Brown (Democratic) 27.17%; ▌ ✓ Jacob Thompson (Democratic) 26.89%; ▌Adam L. Benjamin (Whig) 23.68%; ▌Reuben Davis (Whig) 22.26%

== New York ==
District	Incumbent			This race	
District	Member	Party	First elected	Results	Candidates
New York 1	Thomas B. Jackson	Democratic	1836	Incumbent re-elected.	▌ ✓ Thomas B. Jackson (Democratic) 56.46%; ▌Nathaniel Miller (Whig) 43.54%
New York 2	James De La Montanya	Democratic	1836	Incumbent retired. Democratic hold.	▌ ✓ James De La Montanya (Democratic) 54.48%; ▌John S. Gurnee (Whig) 45.52%
New York 3 Plural district with 4 seats	Ogden Hoffman	Whig	1836	Incumbent re-elected.	▌ ✓ Ogden Hoffman (Whig) 51.54%; ▌ ✓ Moses H. Grinnell (Whig) 51.51%; ▌ ✓ Edward Curtis (Whig) 51.24%; ▌ ✓ James Monroe (Whig) 51.23%; ▌John McKeon (Democratic) 48.31%; ▌Isaac L. Varian (Democratic) 48.10%; ▌Churchill C. Cambreleng (Democratic) 48.10%; ▌Ely Moore (Democratic) 47.20%
New York 3 Plural district with 4 seats	John McKeon	Democratic	1834	Incumbent lost re-election. Whig gain.	▌ ✓ Ogden Hoffman (Whig) 51.54%; ▌ ✓ Moses H. Grinnell (Whig) 51.51%; ▌ ✓ Edward Curtis (Whig) 51.24%; ▌ ✓ James Monroe (Whig) 51.23%; ▌John McKeon (Democratic) 48.31%; ▌Isaac L. Varian (Democratic) 48.10%; ▌Churchill C. Cambreleng (Democratic) 48.10%; ▌Ely Moore (Democratic) 47.20%
New York 3 Plural district with 4 seats	Ely Moore	Democratic	1834	Incumbent lost re-election. Whig gain.	▌ ✓ Ogden Hoffman (Whig) 51.54%; ▌ ✓ Moses H. Grinnell (Whig) 51.51%; ▌ ✓ Edward Curtis (Whig) 51.24%; ▌ ✓ James Monroe (Whig) 51.23%; ▌John McKeon (Democratic) 48.31%; ▌Isaac L. Varian (Democratic) 48.10%; ▌Churchill C. Cambreleng (Democratic) 48.10%; ▌Ely Moore (Democratic) 47.20%
New York 3 Plural district with 4 seats	Gideon Lee	Democratic	1835	Incumbent retired. Whig Gain.	▌ ✓ Ogden Hoffman (Whig) 51.54%; ▌ ✓ Moses H. Grinnell (Whig) 51.51%; ▌ ✓ Edward Curtis (Whig) 51.24%; ▌ ✓ James Monroe (Whig) 51.23%; ▌John McKeon (Democratic) 48.31%; ▌Isaac L. Varian (Democratic) 48.10%; ▌Churchill C. Cambreleng (Democratic) 48.10%; ▌Ely Moore (Democratic) 47.20%
New York 4	Gouverneur Kemble	Democratic	1836	Incumbent re-elected.	▌ ✓ Gouverneur Kemble (Democratic) 54.26%; ▌Joshua W. Bowron (Whig) 45.74%
New York 5	Obadiah Titus	Democratic	1836	Incumbent lost re-election. Whig gain.	▌ ✓ Charles Johnston (Whig) 53.11%; ▌Obadiah Titus (Democratic) 46.89%
New York 6	Nathaniel Jones	Democratic	1836	Incumbent re-elected.	▌ ✓ Gouverneur Kemble (Democratic) 51.26%; ▌ Thomas McKissock (Whig) 48.74%
New York 7	John C. Brodhead	Democratic	1836	Incumbent retired. Whig gain.	▌ ✓ Rufus Palen (Whig) 54.16%; ▌Anthony Hasbrouck (Democratic) 45.84%

== Pennsylvania ==
District	Incumbent			This race	
District	Member	Party	First elected	Results	Candidates (Note: For plural districts, percent is based on assumption that each voter cast as many votes as there are seats)
Pennsylvania 1	Lemuel Paynter	Democratic	1836	Incumbent re-elected.	▌ ✓ Lemuel Paynter (Democratic) 55.1%; ▌Joel B. Sutherland (Whig) 44.9%
Pennsylvania 2 Plural district with 2 seats	John Sergeant	Whig	1816; 1836	Incumbent re-elected.	▌ ✓ George W. Toland (Whig) 69.4%; ▌ ✓ John Sergeant (Whig) 69.2%; ▌Joseph R. Evans (Democratic) 30.7%; ▌Samuel Brasnears (Democratic) 30.7%
Pennsylvania 2 Plural district with 2 seats	George W. Toland	Whig	1836	Incumbent re-elected.	▌ ✓ George W. Toland (Whig) 69.4%; ▌ ✓ John Sergeant (Whig) 69.2%; ▌Joseph R. Evans (Democratic) 30.7%; ▌Samuel Brasnears (Democratic) 30.7%
Pennsylvania 3	Charles Naylor	Whig	1837 (special)	Incumbent re-elected.	▌ ✓ Charles Naylor (Whig) 53.1%; ▌Charles J. Ingersoll (Democratic) 46.9%
Pennsylvania 4 Plural district with 3 seats	Edward Davies	Anti-Masonic	1836	Incumbent re-elected.	▌ ✓ John Edwards (Anti-Masonic) 57.2%; ▌ ✓ Edward Davies (Anti-Masonic) 57.0%; ▌ ✓ Francis James (Anti-Masonic) 57.0%; ▌Joshua Evans Jr. (Democratic) 43.0%; ▌Reah Frazer (Democratic) 43.0%; ▌Samuel Leiper (Democratic) 42.8%
Pennsylvania 4 Plural district with 3 seats	Edward Darlington	Anti-Masonic	1832	Incumbent retired. Anti-Masonic hold.	▌ ✓ John Edwards (Anti-Masonic) 57.2%; ▌ ✓ Edward Davies (Anti-Masonic) 57.0%; ▌ ✓ Francis James (Anti-Masonic) 57.0%; ▌Joshua Evans Jr. (Democratic) 43.0%; ▌Reah Frazer (Democratic) 43.0%; ▌Samuel Leiper (Democratic) 42.8%
Pennsylvania 4 Plural district with 3 seats	David Potts Jr.	Anti-Masonic	1830	Incumbent retired. Anti-Masonic hold.	▌ ✓ John Edwards (Anti-Masonic) 57.2%; ▌ ✓ Edward Davies (Anti-Masonic) 57.0%; ▌ ✓ Francis James (Anti-Masonic) 57.0%; ▌Joshua Evans Jr. (Democratic) 43.0%; ▌Reah Frazer (Democratic) 43.0%; ▌Samuel Leiper (Democratic) 42.8%
Pennsylvania 5	Jacob Fry Jr.	Democratic	1834	Incumbent retired. Democratic hold.	▌ ✓ Joseph Fornance (Democratic) 54.9%; ▌Joseph Royer (Whig) 45.1%
Pennsylvania 6	Mathias Morris	Whig	1834	Incumbent lost re-election. Democratic gain.	▌ ✓ John Davis (Democratic) 51.9%; ▌Mathias Morris (Whig) 48.1%
Pennsylvania 7	David D. Wagener	Democratic	1832	Incumbent re-elected.	▌ ✓ David D. Wagener (Democratic) 63.7%; ▌Peter S. Michler (Whig) 36.3%
Pennsylvania 8	Edward B. Hubley	Democratic	1834	Incumbent retired. Democratic hold.	▌ ✓ Peter Newhard (Democratic) 54.5%; ▌Walter C. Livingston (Whig) 45.5%
Pennsylvania 9	George Keim	Democratic	1838 (special)	Incumbent re-elected.	▌ ✓ George Keim (Democratic) 69.3%; ▌Daniel M. Bieber (Whig) 30.7%
Pennsylvania 10	Luther Reily	Democratic	1836	Incumbent retired. Whig gain.	▌ ✓ William Simonton (Whig) 59.1%; ▌William Reily (Democratic) 40.9%
Pennsylvania 11	Henry Logan	Democratic	1834	Incumbent retired. Democratic hold.	▌ ✓ James Gerry (Democratic) 56.6%; ▌Charles A. Barnitz (Whig) 43.4%
Pennsylvania 12	Daniel Sheffer	Democratic	1836	Incumbent lost re-election. Whig gain.	▌ ✓ James Cooper (Whig) 55.9%; ▌Daniel Sheffer (Democratic) 44.1%
Pennsylvania 13	Charles McClure	Democratic	1836	Incumbent retired. Democratic hold.	▌ ✓ William S. Ramsey (Democratic) 57.3%; ▌Frederick Watts (Whig) 42.7%
Pennsylvania 14	William W. Potter	Democratic	1836	Incumbent re-elected.	▌ ✓ William W. Potter (Democratic) 50.9%; ▌William Irvin (Whig) 49.1%
Pennsylvania 15	David Petrikin	Democratic	1836	Incumbent re-elected.	▌ ✓ David Petrikin (Democratic) 53.5%; ▌David Hurley (Whig) 46.5%
Pennsylvania 16	Robert H. Hammond	Democratic	1836	Incumbent re-elected.	▌ ✓ Robert H. Hammond (Democratic) 56.6%; ▌James Morrill (Whig) 43.4%
Pennsylvania 17	Samuel W. Morris	Democratic	1836	Incumbent re-elected.	▌ ✓ Samuel W. Morris (Democratic) 54.2%; ▌William Willard (Whig) 45.8%
Pennsylvania 18	Charles Ogle	Anti-Masonic	1836	Incumbent re-elected.	▌ ✓ Charles Ogle (Anti-Masonic) 55.9%; ▌Job Mann (Democratic) 44.1%
Pennsylvania 19	John Klingensmith Jr.	Democratic	1832	Incumbent retired. Democratic hold.	▌ ✓ Albert G. Marchand (Democratic) 60.9%; ▌Joseph Markle (Whig) 39.1%
Pennsylvania 20	Andrew Buchanan	Democratic	1832	Incumbent retired. Democratic hold.	▌ ✓ Enos Hook (Democratic) 62.4%; ▌Fideleo Hughes (Whig) 37.6%
Pennsylvania 21	Thomas M. T. McKennan	Anti-Masonic	1830	Incumbent retired. Democratic gain.	▌ ✓ Isaac Leet (Democratic) 50.1%; ▌Joseph Lawrence (Whig) 49.9%
Pennsylvania 22	Richard Biddle	Anti-Masonic	1836	Incumbent re-elected.	▌ ✓ Richard Biddle (Anti-Masonic) 58.1%; ▌James Power (Democratic) 41.9%
Pennsylvania 23	William Beatty	Democratic	1836	Incumbent re-elected.	▌ ✓ William Beatty (Democratic) 61.5%; ▌George W. Smith (Whig) 38.5%
Pennsylvania 24	Thomas Henry	Anti-Masonic	1836	Incumbent re-elected.	▌ ✓ Thomas Henry (Anti-Masonic) 54.7%; ▌James D. White (Democratic) 45.3%
Pennsylvania 25	Arnold Plumer	Democratic	1836	Incumbent retired. Democratic hold.	▌ ✓ John Galbraith (Democratic) 51.2%; ▌David Dick (Whig) 48.8%

In the 3rd district, Charles Naylor's election was unsuccessfully contested by Charles J. Ingersoll.

There were three special elections in Pennsylvania during the 26th Congress. The first was in the 14th district caused by the death of William W. Potter (Democratic) on October 28, 1839. This vacancy was filled by George McCulloch (Democratic). The second was in the 22nd district caused by the resignation of Richard Biddle. This vacancy was filled by Henry M. Brackenridge (Whig). The third was in the 13th district caused by the death of William S. Ramsey (Democratic) on October 17, 1840. Ramsey had also been re-elected to the 27th Congress and so an additional special election was held the following May to fill the vacancy in the 27th Congress.

== Tennessee ==
Elections held late, on August 1, 1839.

District	Incumbent			This race	
District	Member	Party	First elected	Results	Candidates
Tennessee 1	William B. Carter	Whig	1835	Incumbent re-elected.	▌ ✓ William B. Carter (Whig) 58.95%; ▌Joseph Powell (Democratic) 41.05%
Tennessee 2	Abraham McClellan	Democratic	1837	Incumbent re-elected.	▌ ✓ Abraham McClellan (Democratic) 63.32%; ▌John A. McKennry (Whig) 36.68%
Tennessee 3	Joseph L. Williams	Whig	1837	Incumbent re-elected.	▌ ✓ Joseph L. Williams (Whig) 100%
Tennessee 4	William Stone	Whig	1837 (special)	Incumbent lost re-election. Democratic gain.	▌ ✓ Julius W. Blackwell (Democratic) 57.51%; ▌William Stone (Whig) 42.50%
Tennessee 5	Hopkins L. Turney	Democratic	1837	Incumbent re-elected.	▌ ✓ Hopkins L. Turney (Democratic) 65.55%; ▌Anthony Dibrell (Whig) 34.45%
Tennessee 6	William B. Campbell	Whig	1837	Incumbent re-elected.	▌ ✓ William B. Campbell (Whig) 60.48%; ▌William Trousdale (Democratic) 39.52%
Tennessee 7	John Bell	Whig	1827	Incumbent re-elected.	▌ ✓ John Bell (Whig) 59.38%; ▌Robert M. Burton (Democratic) 40.63%
Tennessee 8	Abram P. Maury	Whig	1835	Incumbent retired. Whig hold.	▌ ✓ Meredith P. Gentry (Whig) 54.18%; ▌William G. Childress (Democratic) 45.82%
Tennessee 9	James K. Polk	Democratic	1825	Incumbent retired to run for Governor. Democratic hold.	▌ ✓ Harvey M. Watterson (Democratic) 58.91%; ▌Daniel L. Barenger (Whig) 41.09%
Tennessee 10	Ebenezer J. Shields	Whig	1835	Incumbent lost re-election. Democratic gain.	▌ ✓ Aaron V. Brown (Democratic) 57.77%; ▌Ebenezer J. Shields (Whig) 42.23%
Tennessee 11	Richard Cheatham	Whig	1837	Incumbent lost re-election. Democratic gain.	▌ ✓ Cave Johnson (Democratic) 57.91%; ▌Richard Cheatham (Whig) 42.09%
Tennessee 12	John W. Crockett	Whig	1837	Incumbent re-elected.	▌ ✓ John W. Crockett (Whig) 55.49%; ▌Stephen C. Davatt (Democratic) 44.51%
Tennessee 13	Christopher H. Williams	Whig	1837	Incumbent re-elected.	▌ ✓ Christopher H. Williams (Whig) 54.19%; ▌William C. Dunlap (Democratic) 45.81%

== Vermont ==
District	Incumbent			This race	
District	Member	Party	First elected	Results	Candidates
Vermont 1	Hiland Hall	Whig	1833 (special)	Incumbent re-elected.	▌ ✓ Hiland Hall (Whig) 60.1%; ▌John Roberts (Democratic) 38.4%
Vermont 2	William Slade	Whig	1831 (special)	Incumbent re-elected.	▌ ✓ William Slade (Whig) 69.2%; ▌Charles Linsley (Democratic) 30.1%
Vermont 3	Horace Everett	Whig	1828	Incumbent re-elected.	▌ ✓ Horace Everett (Whig) 56.8%; ▌Alden Partridge (Democratic) 42.1%
Vermont 4	Heman Allen	Whig	1832 (late)	Incumbent lost re-election. Democratic gain.	First ballot: ▌John Smith (Democratic) 49.6%; ▌Heman Allen (Whig) 45.3%; ▌William P. Briggs (Unknown) 4.3%; Second ballot: ▌ ✓ John Smith (Democratic) 54.5%; ▌Heman Allen (Whig) 42.2%; ▌William P. Briggs (Unknown) 2.1%; ▌Stephen Royce (Whig) 0.9%
Vermont 5	Isaac Fletcher	Democratic	1836	Incumbent re-elected.	▌ ✓ Isaac Fletcher (Democratic) 52.8%; ▌William Upham (Whig) 46.6%

== Virginia ==
District	Incumbent			This race	
District	Member	Party	First elected	Results	Candidates
Virginia 1	Joel Holleman	Democratic	1837	Incumbent re-elected.	▌ ✓ Joel Holleman (Democratic) 51.9%; ▌Francis Mallory (Whig) 48.1%
Virginia 2	Francis E. Rives	Democratic	1837	Incumbent re-elected.	▌ ✓ Francis E. Rives (Democratic) 57.6%; ▌William B. Goodwyn (Whig) 42.4%
Virginia 3	John Winston Jones	Democratic	1835	Incumbent re-elected.	▌ ✓ John Winston Jones (Democratic) 58.5%; ▌[FNU] Taylor (Whig) 41.5%
Virginia 4	George Dromgoole	Democratic	1835	Incumbent re-elected.	▌ ✓ George Dromgoole (Democratic) 57.1%; ▌Thomas Gholson Jr. (Whig) 42.9%
Virginia 5	James Bouldin	Democratic	1834 (special)	Incumbent retired. Whig gain.	▌ ✓ John Hill (Whig) 54.1%; ▌Daniel A. Wilson (Democratic) 45.9%
Virginia 6	Walter Coles	Democratic	1835	Incumbent re-elected.	▌ ✓ Walter Coles (Democratic) 51.7%; ▌Vincent Witcher (Whig) 48.3%
Virginia 7	Archibald Stuart	Democratic	1837	Incumbent lost re-election. Whig gain.	▌ ✓ William L. Goggin (Whig) 52.6%; ▌Archibald Stuart (Democratic) 47.4%
Virginia 8	Henry A. Wise	Whig	1833	Incumbent re-elected.	▌ ✓ Henry A. Wise (Whig) 79.6%; ▌William C. Jones (Democratic) 20.4%
Virginia 9	Robert M. T. Hunter	Whig	1837	Incumbent re-elected.	▌ ✓ Robert M. T. Hunter (Whig) 52.0%; ▌Francis Scott (Democratic) 48.0%
Virginia 10	John Taliaferro	Whig	1835	Incumbent re-elected.	▌ ✓ John Taliaferro (Whig) 51.4%; ▌Robert O. Grayson (Democratic) 48.6%
Virginia 11	John Robertson	Whig	1834 (special)	Incumbent retired. Whig hold.	▌ ✓ John Botts (Whig) 53.8%; ▌William Selden (Democratic) 46.2%
Virginia 12	James Garland	Democratic	1835	Incumbent re-elected as a Conservative. Conservative gain.	▌ ✓ James Garland (Conservative) 66.3%; ▌William F. Gordon (Democratic) 33.7%
Virginia 13	Linn Banks	Democratic	1838 (special)	Incumbent re-elected.	▌ ✓ Linn Banks (Democratic) 56.1%; ▌Daniel F. Slaughter (Whig) 43.9%
Virginia 14	Charles F. Mercer	Whig	1817	Incumbent re-elected.	▌ ✓ Charles F. Mercer (Whig) 59.3%; ▌William T. T. Mason (Democratic) 40.7%
Virginia 15	James M. Mason	Democratic	1837	Incumbent retired. Democratic hold.	▌ ✓ William Lucas (Democratic) 50.0%; ▌Richard W. Barton (Whig) 50.0%
Virginia 16	Isaac S. Pennybacker	Democratic	1837	Incumbent retired. Democratic hold.	▌ ✓ Green Berry Samuels (Democratic) 60.3%; ▌David Steele (Whig) 39.7%
Virginia 17	Robert Craig	Democratic	1835	Incumbent re-elected.	▌ ✓ Robert Craig (Democratic) 58.7%; ▌Samuel M. Moore (Whig) 41.3%
Virginia 18	George W. Hopkins	Democratic	1835	Incumbent re-elected as a Conservative. Conservative gain.	▌ ✓ George W. Hopkins (Conservative) 52.7%; ▌John B. George (Whig) 47.3%
Virginia 19	Andrew Beirne	Democratic	1837	Incumbent re-elected.	▌ ✓ Andrew Beirne (Democratic) 61.5%; ▌Pierre B. Withered (Whig) 38.5%
Virginia 20	Joseph Johnson	Democratic	1835	Incumbent re-elected.	▌ ✓ Joseph Johnson (Democratic) 46.6%; ▌George D. Camden (Whig) 38.7%; ▌Wilson K. Shinn (Democratic) 14.8%
Virginia 21	William S. Morgan	Democratic	1835	Incumbent retired. Democratic hold.	▌ ✓ Lewis Steenrod (Democratic) 55.8%; ▌Thomas Haymond (Whig) 44.2%

== Wisconsin Territory ==
See Non-voting delegates, below.

== Non-voting delegates ==
=== 25th Congress ===
District	Incumbent			This race	
District	Delegate	Party	First elected	Results	Candidates
Iowa Territory at-large	None (new district)			New seat. New delegate elected September 10, 1838. Democratic gain.	▌ ✓ William W. Chapman (Democratic) 33.32%; ▌Peter H. Engle (Democratic) 32.51%; ▌Benjamin F. Wallace (Whig) 20.42%; ▌David Rorer (Democratic) 13.53%; Others: ▌Lawrence Taliaferro (Independent) 0.07%; ▌William H. Wallace (Whig) 0.07%; ▌Isaac Leffler (Whig) 0.04%; ▌H. Craighton (Independent) 0.02%; ▌John Foley (Independent) 0.02%

=== 26th Congress ===
District	Incumbent			This race	
District	Delegate	Party	First elected	Results	Candidates
Florida Territory at-large	Charles Downing	Democratic	1836	Incumbent re-elected on an unknown date.	▌ ✓ Charles Downing (Democratic); [data missing]
Iowa Territory at-large	William W. Chapman	Democratic	1838	Incumbent lost re-election. New delegate elected August 5, 1839, but election was invalidated due to a misdrafting of the a territorial statute, and Congress extended the term of the incumbent delegate to 1840.	▌ ✓ Francis Gehon (Democratic) 843 votes; ▌William W. Chapman (Democratic) 24 votes; ▌Joseph M. Robinson (Unknown) 13 votes; Others 18 votes
Wisconsin Territory at-large	George Wallace Jones	Democratic	1836	Incumbent lost re-election. New delegate elected in September 1838. Democratic hold. Incumbent claimed that prior 1836 election had entitled him to serve until March 1839, but the house disagreed and seated the winner January 14, 1839.	▌ ✓ James Duane Doty (Democratic); ▌George Wallace Jones (Democratic)

== See also ==
- 1838 United States elections
  - List of United States House of Representatives elections (1824–1854)
  - 1838–39 United States Senate elections
- 25th United States Congress
- 26th United States Congress

== Bibliography ==
- Dubin, Michael J. (March 1, 1998). 1788 United States Congressional Elections-1997: The Official Results of the Elections of the 1st Through 105th Congresses. McFarland and Company. ISBN 978-0786402830.
- Martis, Kenneth C. (January 1, 1989). The Historical Atlas of Political Parties in the United States Congress, 1789-1989. Macmillan Publishing Company. ISBN 978-0029201701.
- Moore, John L., ed. (1994). Congressional Quarterly's Guide to U.S. Elections (Third ed.). Congressional Quarterly Inc. ISBN 978-0871879967.
- "Party Divisions of the House of Representatives 1789–Present". Office of the Historian, House of United States House of Representatives.
