= 1832 United States House of Representatives elections in Pennsylvania =

Following the reapportionment resulting from the 1830 census, Pennsylvania gained two representatives, increasing from 26 to 28, and was redistricted into 25 districts, two of which were plural districts. Pennsylvania elected its members October 9, 1832.

District	Incumbent			This race	
District	Member	Party	First elected	Results	Candidates (Note: For plural districts, percent is based on assumption that each voter cast as many votes as there are seats)
Pennsylvania 1	Joel B. Sutherland	Jacksonian	1826	Incumbent re-elected. Winner resigned to become a judge but then won re-election to the seat.	✓ Joel B. Sutherland (Jacksonian) 50.0%; James Gowen (Anti-Jacksonian) 40.5%; Samuel B. Davis (Jacksonian) 9.5%
Pennsylvania 2 Plural district with 2 seats	Henry Horn	Jacksonian	1830	Incumbent lost re-election. New member elected. Anti-Jacksonian gain.	✓ Horace Binney (Anti-Jacksonian) 62.9%; ✓ James Harper (Anti-Jacksonian) 59.9%; Benjamin Richards (Jacksonian) 39.8%; Henry Horn (Jacksonian) 37.4%
Pennsylvania 2 Plural district with 2 seats	None (Seat created)			New seat. New member elected. Anti-Jacksonian gain.	✓ Horace Binney (Anti-Jacksonian) 62.9%; ✓ James Harper (Anti-Jacksonian) 59.9%; Benjamin Richards (Jacksonian) 39.8%; Henry Horn (Jacksonian) 37.4%
Pennsylvania 3	John G. Watmough	Anti-Jacksonian	1830	Incumbent re-elected.	✓ John G. Watmough (Anti-Jacksonian) 53.7%; Jesse R. Burden (Jacksonian) 34.4%; Mahon M. Lewis (Jacksonian) 11.9%
Pennsylvania 4 Plural district with 3 seats	William Hiester	Anti-Masonic	1830	Incumbent re-elected.	✓ William Hiester (Anti-Masonic) 58.5%; ✓ David Potts Jr. (Anti-Masonic) 58.4%%; ✓ Edward Darlington (Anti-Masonic) 58.3%; Frederick Hambright (Jacksonian) 41.7%; John Morgan (Jacksonian) 41.6%; Henry Myers (Jacksonian) 41.5%
Pennsylvania 4 Plural district with 3 seats	Joshua Evans Jr.	Jacksonian	1828	Incumbent retired. New member elected. Anti-Masonic gain.	✓ William Hiester (Anti-Masonic) 58.5%; ✓ David Potts Jr. (Anti-Masonic) 58.4%%; ✓ Edward Darlington (Anti-Masonic) 58.3%; Frederick Hambright (Jacksonian) 41.7%; John Morgan (Jacksonian) 41.6%; Henry Myers (Jacksonian) 41.5%
Pennsylvania 4 Plural district with 3 seats	David Potts Jr.	Anti-Masonic	1830	Incumbent re-elected.	✓ William Hiester (Anti-Masonic) 58.5%; ✓ David Potts Jr. (Anti-Masonic) 58.4%%; ✓ Edward Darlington (Anti-Masonic) 58.3%; Frederick Hambright (Jacksonian) 41.7%; John Morgan (Jacksonian) 41.6%; Henry Myers (Jacksonian) 41.5%
Pennsylvania 5	Joel K. Mann	Jacksonian	1830	Incumbent re-elected.	✓ Joel K. Mann (Jacksonian) 54.5%; Benjamin Reiff (Anti-Masonic) 45.5%
Pennsylvania 6	None (District created)			New seat. New member elected. Jacksonian gain.	✓ Robert Ramsey (Jacksonian) 43.9%; Mathias Morris (Anti-Jacksonian) 38.6%; Thomas Ross (Anti-Masonic) 17.5%
Pennsylvania 7	Peter Ihrie Jr. Redistricted from the 8th district	Jacksonian	1829 (Special)	Incumbent lost re-election. New member elected. Jacksonian hold	✓ David D. Wagener (Jacksonian) 58.3%; Peter Ihrie Jr. (Anti-Masonic (Note: Changed parties)) 34.7%; Owen Rice 6.9%
Pennsylvania 8	Henry King; Redistricted from the 7th district	Jacksonian	1830	Incumbent re-elected.	✓ Henry King (Jacksonian) 54.3%; William Audenreid (Anti-Masonic) 45.7%
Pennsylvania 9	Henry A. P. Muhlenberg; Redistricted from the 7th district	Jacksonian	1828	Incumbent re-elected.	✓ Henry A. P. Muhlenberg (Jacksonian) 57.1%; David Hollenstein (Anti-Masonic) 42.9%
Pennsylvania 10	John C. Bucher; Redistricted from the 6th district	Jacksonian	1830	Incumbent lost re-election. New member elected. Anti-Masonic gain.	✓ William Clark (Anti-Masonic) 60.7%; John C. Bucher (Jacksonian) 39.3%
Pennsylvania 11	Adam King; Redistricted from the 10th district	Jacksonian	1826	Incumbent lost re-election. New member elected. Anti-Masonic gain.	✓ Charles A. Barnitz (Anti-Masonic) 51.9%; Adam King (Jacksonian) 48.1%
Pennsylvania 12	Thomas H. Crawford; Redistricted from the 11th district	Jacksonian	1828	Incumbent lost re-election. New member elected. Anti-Masonic gain.	✓ George Chambers (Anti-Masonic) 55.6%; Thomas H. Crawford (Jacksonian) 44.4%
Pennsylvania 13	None (District created)			New seat. New member elected. Jacksonian gain.	✓ Jesse Miller (Jacksonian) 53.8%; Thomas Whiteside (Anti-Masonic) 46.2%
Pennsylvania 14	None (District created)			New seat. New member elected. Jacksonian gain.	✓ Joseph Henderson (Jacksonian) 52.9%; James Milliken (Anti-Masonic) 47.1%
Pennsylvania 15	None (District created)			New seat. New member elected. Jacksonian gain.	✓ Andrew Beaumont (Jacksonian) 34.8%; Thomas W. Miner (Anti-Masonic/Anti-Jacksonian) 33.3%; James McClintock (Independent Jacksonian) 31.9%
Pennsylvania 16	None (District created)			New seat. New member elected. Jacksonian gain.	✓ Joseph B. Anthony (Jacksonian) 58.1%; Ner Middleswarth (Anti-Masonic) 41.9%
Pennsylvania 17	None (District created)			New seat. New member elected. Jacksonian gain.	✓ John Laporte (Jacksonian) 60.3%; Simon Kinney (Anti-Masonic) 39.7%
Pennsylvania 18	George Burd; Redistricted from the 13th district	Anti-Jacksonian	1830	Incumbent re-elected.	✓ George Burd (Anti-Jacksonian) 52.0%; David Mann (Anti-Masonic) 48.0%
Pennsylvania 19	Richard Coulter; Redistricted from the 17th district	Jacksonian	1826	Incumbent re-elected.	✓ Richard Coulter (Jacksonian) 100%
Pennsylvania 20	Andrew Stewart; Redistricted from the 14th district	Anti-Masonic	1820; 1828 (Lost); 1830	Incumbent re-elected.	✓ Andrew Stewart (Anti-Masonic) 51.8%; William G. Hawkins (Jacksonian) 48.8%
Pennsylvania 21	Thomas M. T. McKennan; Redistricted from the 15th district	Anti-Masonic	1830	Incumbent re-elected.	✓ Thomas M. T. McKennan (Anti-Masonic) 56.1%; William McCreery (Jacksonian) 43.9%
Pennsylvania 22	Harmar Denny; Redistricted from the 16th district	Anti-Masonic	1829 (Special)	Incumbent re-elected.	✓ Harmar Denny (Anti-Masonic) 61.2%; William Robinson (Jacksonian) 38.8%
Pennsylvania 23	None (District created)			New seat. New member elected. Jacksonian gain.	✓ Samuel S. Harrison (Jacksonian) 61.0%; William Ayers (Anti-Masonic) 39.0%
Pennsylvania 24	John Banks; Redistricted from the 18th district	Anti-Masonic	1830	Incumbent re-elected.	✓ John Banks (Anti-Masonic) 51.1%; Samuel Power (Jacksonian) 48.9%
Pennsylvania 25	None (District created)			New seat. New member elected. Jacksonian gain.	✓ John Galbraith (Jacksonian) 55.2%; Thomas H. Sill (Anti-Masonic) 44.8%

== See also ==
- 1832 Pennsylvania's 9th congressional district special election
- 1833 Pennsylvania's 1st congressional district special election
- 1832 and 1833 United States House of Representatives elections
- List of United States representatives from Pennsylvania
