= William Hiester (Pennsylvania politician) =

American politician

William Hiester Jr.

Member of the U.S. House of Representatives from Pennsylvania's 4th district
- In office March 4, 1831 – March 3, 1837
- Preceded by: James Buchanan
- Succeeded by: Edward Davies

Speaker of the Pennsylvania Senate
- In office 1842–1842
- Preceded by: John Hoge Ewing
- Succeeded by: Benjamin Crispin

Member of the Pennsylvania Senate from the 6th district
- In office 1841–1841
- Preceded by: Thomas Evans Cochran
- Succeeded by: Henry Chapman

Personal details
- Born: October 10, 1790 Berne, Pennsylvania, U.S.
- Died: October 13, 1853 (aged 63) New Holland, Pennsylvania, U.S.
- Party: Anti-Masonic
- Children: Isaac
- Relatives: Hiester family

Military service
- Branch/service: Pennsylvania Militia
- Rank: Lieutenant
- Battles/wars: War of 1812

William Hiester Jr. (October 10, 1790 – October 13, 1853) was an American politician from Pennsylvania who served as an Anti-Masonic member of the United States House of Representatives for Pennsylvania's 4th congressional district from 1831 to 1837.

As a member of the Hiester Family political dynasty, he was the father of U.S. Congressman Isaac Ellmaker Hiester and the uncle of Pennsylvania State Senator and U.S. Congressman Hiester Clymer.

== Biography ==
A son of William Hiester, Sr. and Anna Maria (Myer) Hiester, William Hiester Jr. was born in Berne, Pennsylvania on October 10, 1790. After attending the local, public schools, he became a farmer and merchant in Lancaster County.

On February 8, 1824, he wed Lucy Ellmaker (1797-1854). As a member of the prominent Ellmaker family, she was the only child of Isaac Ellmaker (1762-1830) and Christiana Ellmaker (1764-1802). William and Lucy Hiester's son, Isaac Ellmaker Hiester, who was born in New Holland, Lancaster, Pennsylvania on May 29, 1824, would go on to become a member of the U.S. House of Representatives.

=== Military service ===
William Hiester Jr. served as second lieutenant with Captain Jacob Marshall's infantry company of the Pennsylvania Militia's First Regiment, Second Brigade during the War of 1812. His unit left Reading, Pennsylvania on September 2, 1814, and was assigned to duties in York, Pennsylvania until March 4, 1815, according to Pennsylvania historian Morton L. Montgomery.

=== Political career ===
During the early and mid-1820s, Hiester practiced law in Lancaster County. His duties including assisting clients with the resolution of family estate matters. He was also active in local politics and government, serving as Lancaster County Justice of the Peace from 1823 to 1828 and as Secretary of the State Caucus for the Anti-Masonic Convention in 1828.

Although Hiester ran unsuccessfully for the United States House of Representatives in 1819 and 1828, he was a successful Anti-Masonic Party candidate for Congress in 1830, serving three terms from March 4, 1831 to March 4, 1837. During his tenure, he advocated for various economic reform measures, including tariffs and the "re-establishment of a sound National Currency."

Hiester was then appointed as a delegate to the Pennsylvania Constitutional Convention, 1837-1838, remained active with Democratic Anti-Masonic politics, subsequently served in the Pennsylvania State Senate for the 6th district from 1840 to 1842, and was elected Speaker of the Pennsylvania Senate in 1842.

=== Later years ===
During the final phase of his life, Hiester devoted his time to farming. He also remained active in local politics and in charitable and civic affairs.

== Illness, death and burial ==
Sometime during the final decade of his life, Hiester fell ill with a disease which caused paralysis. After several years of worsening health, he died from Apoplexy at his home in New Holland, Pennsylvania on October 13, 1853. He was interred at the Lancaster Cemetery in Lancaster, Pennsylvania.

In 1854, a large, four-piece monument was erected above the graves of William Hiester and his wife, Lucy. In addition to a roughly eleven-foot-tall obelisk adorned with a wreath of lilies and roses and marked with the Hiester surname in raised letters, a die "beautifully worked, the top ... finished with scrolls and carving, and on each of the four narrow sides ... a scroll Console highly ornamented," and a roughly four-foot-tall plinth supporting the console, with a roughly five-by-twelve-inch base. Crafted from Italian marble, it reportedly weighed 18,000 pounds.

U.S. House of Representatives
Preceded by James Buchanan; Joshua Evans, Jr. and George G. Leiper	Member of the U.S. House of Representatives from Pennsylvania's 4th congressional district 1831–1837 1831–1833 alongside: David Potts, Jr. and Joshua Evans, Jr. 1833–1837 alongside: Edward Darlington and David Potts, Jr.	Succeeded by Edward Davies; David Potts, Jr. and Edward Darlington
Pennsylvania State Senate
Preceded by Thomas Evans Cochran	Member of the Pennsylvania Senate, 6th district 1841-1843	Succeeded by Henry Chapman
