= Middletown Friends Meetinghouse =

Historic Quaker church in Delaware County, Pennsylvania

Coordinates: 39.924268°N 75.443558°W

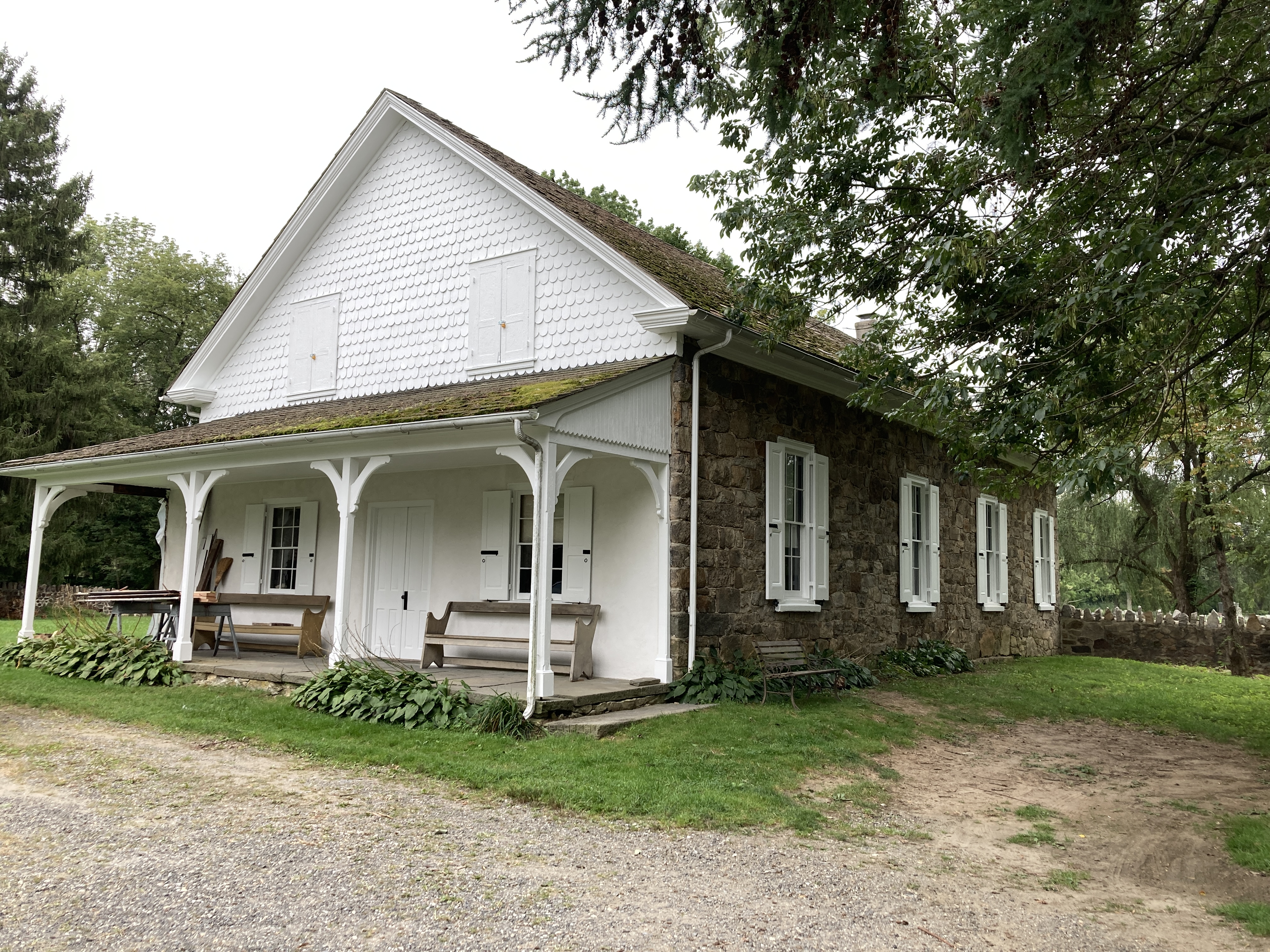
Middletown Preparative Meetinghouse at 513 N Old Middletown Rd

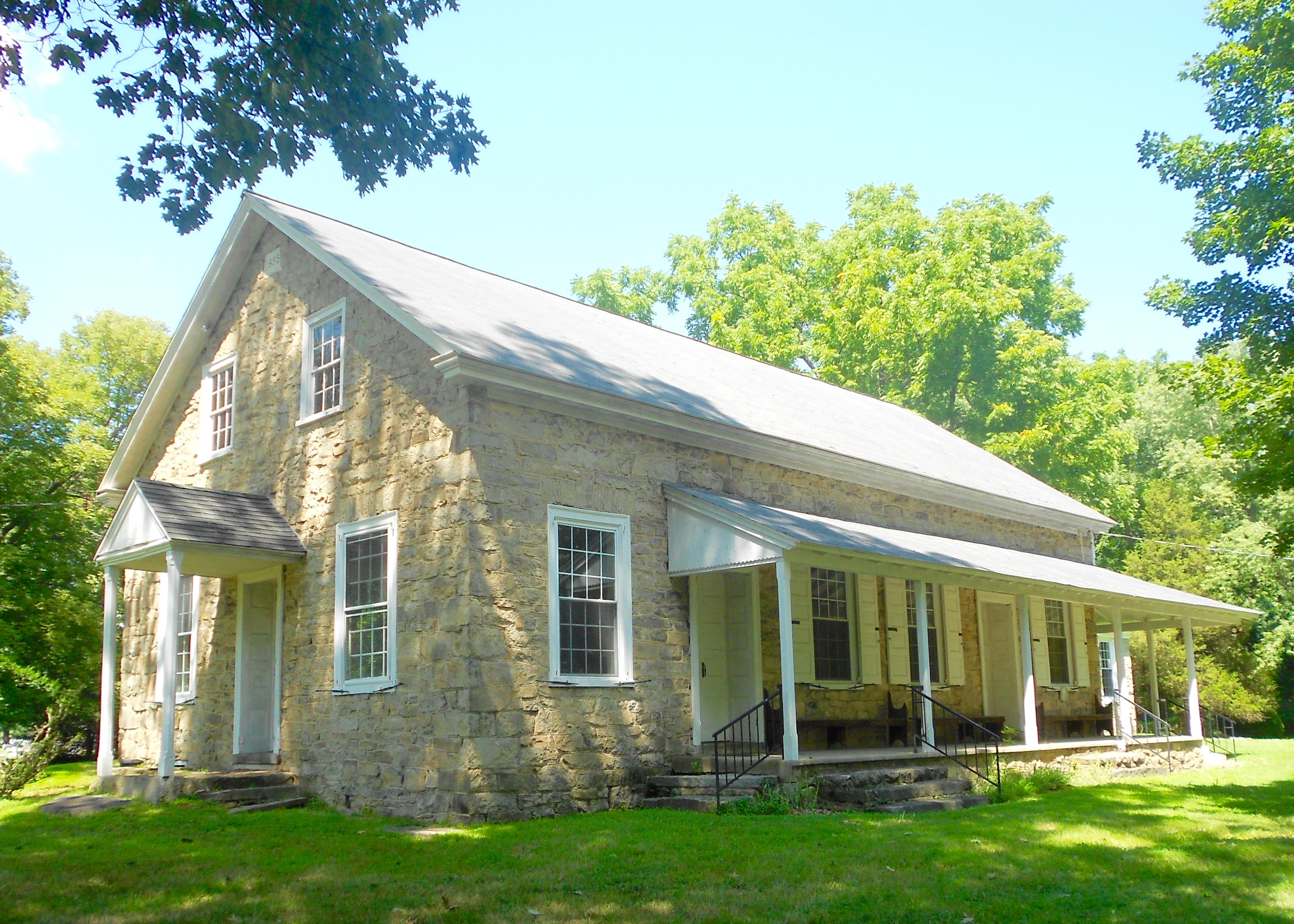
Active Middletown Friends Meeting House Lima PA at 435 N Middletown Road

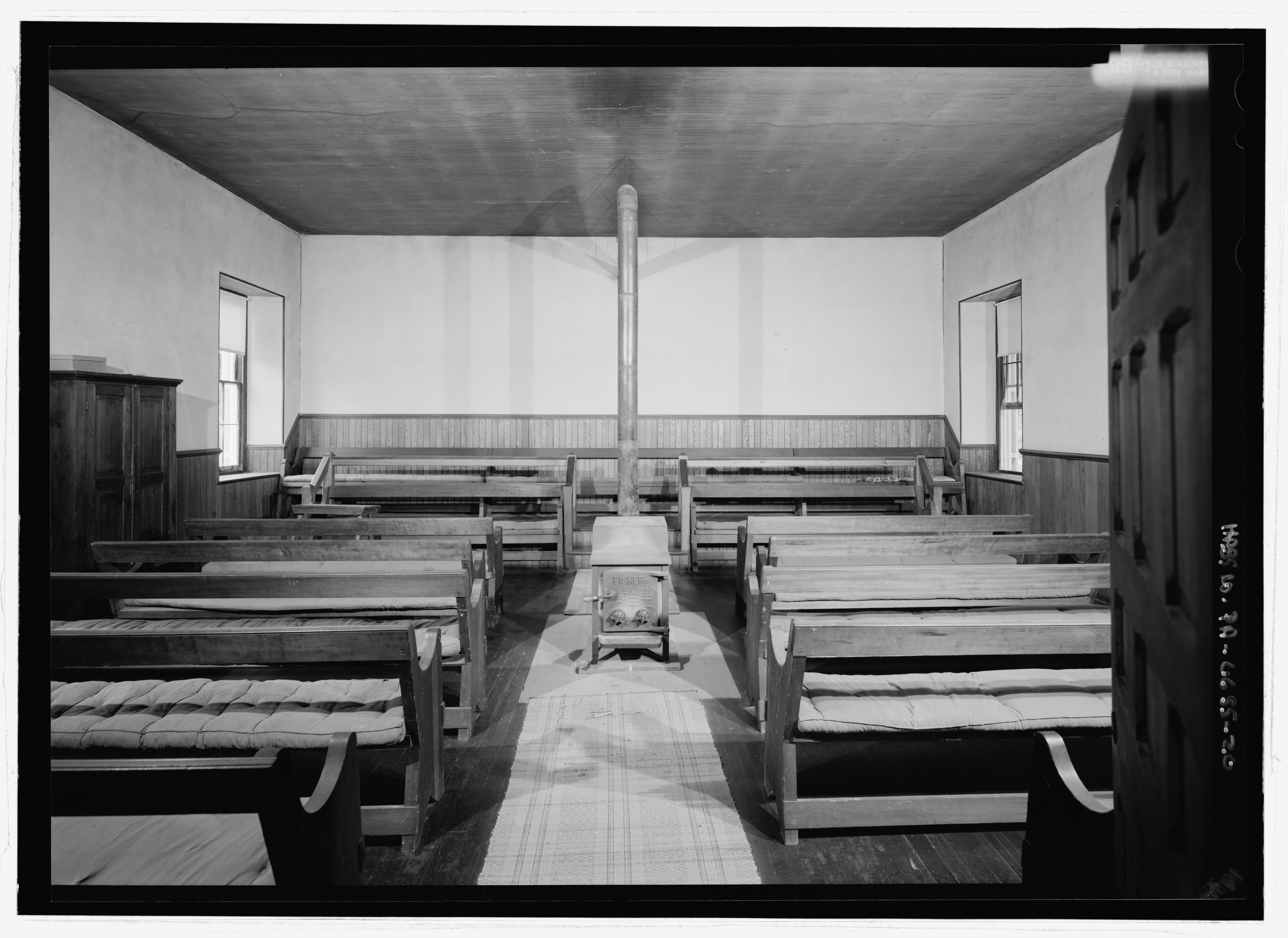
Interior of Middletown Friends Meetinghouse from Historic American Buildings Survey Photo

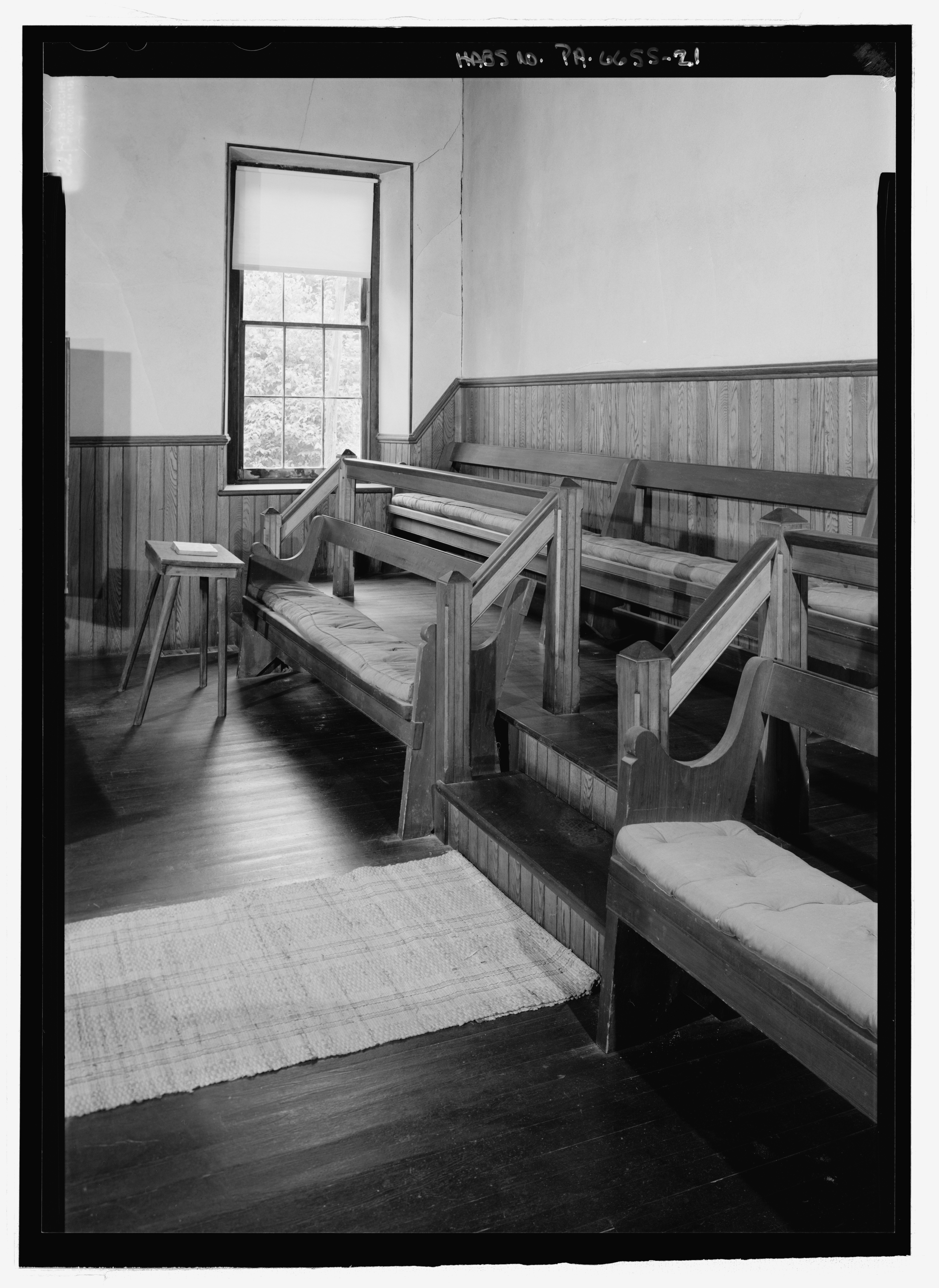
Benches inside Middletown Friends Meetinghouse from Historic American Buildings Survey Photo

Middletown Preparative Friends Meetinghouse is a historic Quaker meeting house at 513 N Old Middletown Road in Lima, Middletown Township, Delaware County, Pennsylvania, United States. It is one of the oldest Friends meetinghouses in what was originally Chester County.

The first mention of an organized Friends meeting in Middletown Township was in 1686. The location and construction of a meetinghouse was noted in 1699 and the Middletown Friends Meetinghouse was completed in 1702. After a doctrinal split between Philadelphia Quakers, a number of "orthodox" members were forced out of the Meeting. They built another meetinghouse slightly to the south in 1835.

During the 1790s, the building was doubled in size through the addition of a separate apartment. In the 1880s, the meetinghouse was reconfigured creating a more church-like appearance and orientation.

The other Middletown Friends meetinghouse at 435 N Middletown Road is an active worship center.

John Edwards, the Congressman from Pennsylvania is interred at the Middletown Friends Meetinghouse cemetery.
