= Samuel Anderson (Pennsylvania politician) =

American politician (1773–1850)

Member of the U.S. House of Representatives from Pennsylvania's 4th district
- In office March 4, 1827 – March 3, 1829
- Preceded by: James Buchanan, Samuel Edwards, Charles Miner
- Succeeded by: James Buchanan, Joshua Evans, Jr., George G. Leiper

Member of the Pennsylvania House of Representatives
- In office 1815–1818; 1823–1825; 1829–1835

Personal details
- Born: 1773 Middletown, Province of Pennsylvania, British America
- Died: January 17, 1850 (aged 76–77) Chester, Pennsylvania, U.S.
- Party: Adams Party

Military service
- Branch/service: United States Navy, Pennsylvania militia
- Rank: Surgeon, Lieutenant colonel

Samuel Anderson (1773 – January 17, 1850) was an American politician from Pennsylvania who served as an Adams Party member of the U.S. House of Representatives from Pennsylvania's 4th congressional district from 1827 to 1829. He served as a member of the Pennsylvania House of Representatives from 1815 to 1818 and again from 1823 to 1825.

During the War of 1812, Anderson raised a group of volunteers known as the Mifflin Guards and served as captain. He continued to serve in the Pennsylvania militia and was promoted to lieutenant colonel in 1821.

== Early life and education ==
Samuel Anderson was born in Middletown in the Province of Pennsylvania to Reverend James and Margaret (McDowell) Anderson. He studied medicine and was admitted to practice in 1796.

== Military career ==
In July 1799, he was appointed by President John Adams as surgeon's mate in the U.S. Navy. A month later, he was commissioned surgeon and assigned to duty under Captain David Porter, who was a personal friend of the doctor. He resigned his commission and in 1801 settled in Chester, Pennsylvania, where he continued the practice of medicine.

During the War of 1812, Anderson raised a group of volunteers known as the Mifflin Guards. He was commissioned captain on September 10, 1814 and served for three months at Fort DuPont. He served in the Pennsylvania Militia and was promoted to the rank of lieutenant colonel in the One Hundredth Regiment, Second Brigade, Third Division, on August 3, 1821.

In 1823, Anderson was recalled to active duty in the Navy and was assigned to the West Indies Squadron commanded by Commodore Porter. In 1824, he was surgeon on the USS Hornet and later the same year on the USS Decoy stationed at Matanzas, Cuba.

== Political career ==
Anderson was elected as a Federalist member of the Pennsylvania House of Representatives from 1815 to 1818 and 1823 to 1825. He served as sheriff of Delaware County, Pennsylvania, from 1819 to 1823.

In 1827, Anderson was elected to the Twentieth Congress to represent Pennsylvania's 4th congressional district and served until 1829.

He was reelected as a Democratic member of the Pennsylvania House of Representatives from 1829 to 1830. He was reelected as a Republican member of the Pennsylvania House of Representatives in 1831 and served until 1835.

In 1832, Anderson was elected as the 60th Speaker of the Pennsylvania House of Representatives. During his Speakership, he signed important bills on road construction as well as canal and railroad incorporation and regulation.

In 1840, Anderson was appointed Inspector of Customs at the Lazaretto in Tinicum Township, Pennsylvania and served until 1845. He was elected justice of the peace in 1846 and served until his death in 1850.

== Personal life ==
In 1802, Anderson married Sarah Richards and together they had six children.

U.S. House of Representatives
Preceded by James Buchanan; Samuel Edwards; Charles Miner	Member of the U.S. House of Representatives from Pennsylvania's 4th congressional district 1827–1829 alongside: James Buchanan and Charles Miner	Succeeded by James Buchanan; Joshua Evans, Jr. George G. Leiper
