= Charles Miner =

American abolitionist and politician (1780–1865)

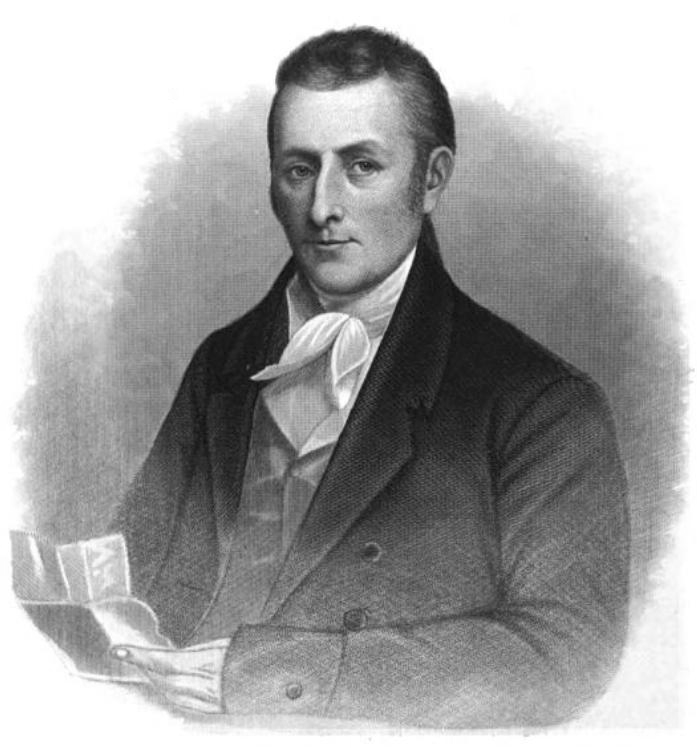
- Sketch of Miner in a 1921 publication

Member of the U.S. House of Representatives from Pennsylvania's 4th district
- In office March 4, 1825 – March 3, 1829
- Preceded by: Isaac Wayne
- Succeeded by: Joshua Evans Jr.

Member of the Pennsylvania House of Representatives
- In office 1807–1808

Personal details
- Born: February 1, 1780 Norwich, Connecticut
- Died: October 26, 1865 (aged 85) Plains Township, Pennsylvania
- Party: Federalist
- Spouse: Letitia Wright (m. 1804)
- Children: 10
- Occupation: Publisher, politician

Charles Miner (February 1, 1780 – October 26, 1865) was an American anti-slavery advocate and politician who served in the Pennsylvania State House of Representatives from 1807 to 1808 and the United States House of Representatives from 1825 to 1829. He was a member of the Federalist Party. During his terms in Congress, he proposed to end the slave trade in the District of Columbia and gradually abolish slavery across the city.

== Early life and career ==
Charles Miner was born in Norwich, Connecticut, son of Seth Miner and Anna Charleton. He attended the public schools of Norwich and moved with his brother Asher Miner in 1797 to his father's lands in the Wyoming Valley, and to Wilkes-Barre, Pennsylvania, in 1802. He became the publisher of the Luzerne County Federalist.

Miner was elected as a Federalist to the Pennsylvania House of Representatives and served in 1807 and 1808. He moved to West Chester, Pennsylvania, in 1816. He was elected as an Adams candidate to the Nineteenth and Twentieth Congresses. He was not a candidate for renomination in 1828.

He edited and published the Village Record from 1829 to 1832. He returned to Wilkes-Barre in 1834 and became involved in the mining of the large fields of anthracite coal in the Wyoming Valley. He died in Wilkes-Barre in 1865 and was interred in Hollenback Cemetery in Wilkes-Barre.

Miner's essay "Who'll turn Grindstone?", published in the Luzerne Sentinel in 1810, coined the phrase "an ax to grind" as a metaphor for having ulterior personal motives. "When I see a man holding a fat office, sounding 'the horn on the borders,' to call the people to support the man, on whom he depends for his office, Well thinks I, no wonder the man is zealous in his cause, he evidently has a axe to grind."

== Personal life ==
Miner was born on February 1, 1780, in Norwich, Connecticut. As a boy, he attended school in Norwich and learned the trades of printing and book-binding. In February 1799, he moved to Pennsylvania under the Connecticut land claim and settled on his father's land in present-day Susquehanna County. For two years, he lived the life of a poor pioneer, making his living by farming, cutting wood, and producing maple sugar.

Miner later moved to Wilkes-Barre, Pennsylvania, where his brother Asher Miner lived. Together, the brothers took ownership of the Luzerne Federalist, one of the city's newspapers. Although the paper repeatedly changed names, Charles edited for a total of thirteen years.

While living in Wilkes-Barre, Miner also married Letitia Wright in 1804. They had ten children together.

== Pennsylvania House of Representatives ==
Miner was an active member of the Wilkes-Barre community, serving on several city boards and councils. In 1807, he was elected to represent Luzerne County in the Pennsylvania House of Representatives. During his term, he promoted internal improvements to roads and canals, aid for the poor, compulsory vaccines for kinepox, and the regulation of bank currency.

== United States House of Representatives and anti-slavery efforts ==
In 1817, Miner bought the Chester and Delaware Federalist and moved his family to West Chester, Pennsylvania. However, he had to leave his newspaper business when he was elected to the United States House of Representatives for Chester, Delaware, and Lancaster counties in 1824. He was re-elected once, and therefore served in the Nineteenth Congress and Twentieth Congress.

During Miner's terms, slavery was still widespread in the South and West, but Northern states were already reflecting anti-slavery views. Miner presented his first anti-slavery proposal to the House on May 13, 1826. He introduced his plan to immediately end the slave trade in the District of Columbia and gradually abolish slavery in the capitol over a period of about ten years. Miner thought that immediate, nationwide abolition was impossible, but he hoped that if the District of Columbia could successfully abolish slavery, it would act as a “lever” to influence the rest of the country to do likewise. Congress adjourned before he could elaborate on the topic. He tried to readdress the plan in December 1826, but he was encouraged not to speak because the topic provoked excitement and irritation, especially among the Southern representatives.

Despite the opposition, Miner continued to work toward gradual abolition. In 1828, he presented a petition titled “Memorial of the Inhabitants of the District of Columbia, praying for the gradual abolition of Slavery in the District of Columbia” to the House. The document asserts:

While the laws of the United States denounce the foreign trade as piracy, and punish with death those who are found engaged in its perpetration, there exists in this District, the Seat of National Government, a domestic slave trade, scarcely less disgraceful in its character and even more demoralizing in its influence. For this is not like the former, carried on against a barbarous nation; its victims are reared up among the People of this Country; educated in the precepts of the same religion; and imbued with similar domestic attachments.

Miner primarily argued that the slave trade was cruel and unjust. Slavery, he believed, contradicted both American and Christian values, and therefore depleted the morality of the citizens.

Miner's final and most influential anti-slavery effort occurred in January 1829. In preparation for his proposal, he visited prisons and auctions to discuss the issue of slavery with slaves and jail keepers. He was especially disturbed to learn that free men were kidnapped and sold as slaves or imprisoned for minor debts. All black people in the District of Columbia were assumed to be slaves unless they could provide proof for their freedom, so free men were often mistaken for runaways, arrested, and sold into slavery. In Miner's final speech, he recalled the cruelty he witnessed, exposing the House to the brutal reality of the slave trade. Miner and his supporters also cited Article I, Section 8, which justified Congress's power over the District of Columbia. At the end of the speech, he offered a series of resolutions that asked the House to investigate the injustices of the slave trade (particularly the arrests of free men, the District's prison systems, and the splitting apart of slave families) and consider the gradual abolition plan. A large majority voted to inquire into Miner's resolutions.

Miner's resolutions won the vote, but the House never acted on his plans. The House eventually abolished slavery in the District of Columbia in 1862, long after Miner's proposal.

Still, Miner's efforts laid a foundation for the early abolitionist movement. He brought the question of slavery to the House and sparked conversation about abolition. Miner was not the first legislator to challenge slavery, but he was the first to persistently advocate anti-slavery proposals over a long period.

== Other accomplishments ==
Miner was an early investor in anthracite coal mining in Mauch Chunk, Pennsylvania, and promoted the coal trade years before it became a major industry. He was also an avid writer who composed poems and moralistic essays. Most notably, he published a series of ethical stories titled From the Desk of Poor Robert the Scribe, which he composed while editing the Luzerne Federalist. The essay "Who'll Turn Grindstone?" gained national popularity, in which Miner allegedly coined the phrase "to have an ax to grind," although the saying is commonly attributed to Benjamin Franklin. Miner also had an interest in history, and wrote History of Wyoming in a Series of Letters from Charles Miner, to his son William Penn Miner, which outlined major events in the Wyoming Valley.

== Later life ==
After completing his second term in Congress, Miner decided not to run again because he was growing deaf and could not fully participate in the sessions. Miner died on October 26, 1865, in present-day Plains Township, Pennsylvania.

== Sources ==
- Boyd, Julian P. (1930). Foreword. Essays from the Desk of Poor Robert the Scribe. By Charles Miner. New York: W.E. Rudge, Inc.
- Kulp, George B. (1885). Families of the Wyoming Valley. Vol. 1. Wilkes-Barre: E.P. Yordy.
- Miner, Charles (1845). History of Wyoming in a Series of Letters from Charles Miner, to his son William Penn Miner. Philadelphia: J. Crissy.
- Miner, Charles (March 16, 2016), Memorial of the Inhabitants of the District of Columbia praying for the gradual abolition of slavery in the District of Columbia. 24 Mar. 1828., Charles Miner Papers, Wilkes-Barre, PA.: Luzerne County Historical Society
- Newman, Richard S. (2002). The Transformation of American Abolitionism: Fighting Slavery in the Early Republic. Chapel Hill and London: University of North Carolina Press.
- Oakes, James (2014). The Scorpion's Sting: Antislavery and the Coming of the Civil War. New York: Norton.
- Richardson, Charles Francis, and Elizabeth Miner (Thomas) Richardson. Charles Miner, A Pennsylvania Pioneer. Wilkes-Barre: n.p., 1916. Print.

U.S. House of Representatives
Preceded by James S. Mitchell	Member of the U.S. House of Representatives from Pennsylvania's 4th congressional district 1825–1829; 1825–1827 alongside:James Buchanan and Samuel Edwards; 1827–1829 alongside:James Buchanan and Samuel Anderson	Succeeded by James Buchanan; Joshua Evans, Jr. George G. Leiper
