= 1833 Pennsylvania's 1st congressional district special election =

In the October 9, 1832 elections, Joel B. Sutherland (D) was re-elected to the 1st district, but resigned his seat to accept a judgeship. He then subsequently resigned that judgeship to run in the October 8, 1833 special election which was called to fill the vacancy caused by his original resignation, and won that election.

== Election results ==
Candidate	Party	Votes	Percent
Joel B. Sutherland	Democratic	2,843	56.4%
John Sergeant	National Republican	2,140	42.5%

There were also 57 votes for someone with the surname of Martin, first name and party affiliation unknown.

== See also ==
- List of special elections to the United States House of Representatives
