= Anti-Masonic Party =

1820s–1830s American political party

- Leader: Solomon Southwick; Thurlow Weed; William Wirt
- Founded: First: September 1827; 199 years ago Second: 1872; 154 years ago
- Dissolved: First: December 1840; 185 years ago Second: 1884; 142 years ago
- Merged into: First: Whig Party; Second: Prohibition Party
- Headquarters: Albany, New York
- Newspaper: Anti-Masonic Enquirer; National Observer; Albany Journal
- Ideology: American School; Anti-elitism; Anti-Jacksonianism; Anti-Masonry
- Religion: Protestantism
- National affiliation: National Republican Party (1828)

The Anti-Masonic Party was the earliest third party in the United States. Formally a single-issue party, it strongly opposed Freemasonry in the United States. It was active from the late 1820s, especially in the Northeastern United States, and later attempted to become a major party by expanding its platform to take positions on other issues. It declined quickly after 1832 as most members joined the new Whig Party; it dissolved after 1838.

The party was founded following the disappearance of William Morgan, a former Mason who had become a prominent critic of the Masonic organization. Many believed that Masons had murdered Morgan for speaking out against Masonry and subsequently many churches and other groups condemned Masonry. As many Masons were prominent businessmen and politicians, the backlash against the Masons was also a form of anti-elitism. The Anti-Masons purported that Masons posed a threat to American republicanism by secretly trying to control the government. Furthermore, there was a strong fear that Masonry was hostile to Christianity.

Mass opposition to Masonry eventually coalesced into a political party. Before and during the presidency of John Quincy Adams, there was a period of political realignment. The Anti-Masons emerged as a third-party alternative to Andrew Jackson's Democrats and Adams' National Republicans. In New York, the Anti-Masons supplanted the National Republicans as the primary opposition to the Democrats.

After experiencing unexpected success in the 1828 elections, the Anti-Masons adopted positions on other issues, including support for internal improvements and a protective tariff. Several Anti-Masons, including William A. Palmer and Joseph Ritner, won election to prominent positions. In states such as Pennsylvania and Rhode Island, the party controlled the balance of power in the state legislature and provided crucial support to candidates for the United States Senate. In 1831, the party held the first presidential nominating convention, a practice that was subsequently adopted by all major parties. Delegates chose former U.S. attorney general William Wirt as their standard bearer in the 1832 presidential election; Wirt won 7.8% of the popular vote and carried Vermont.

As the 1830s progressed, many of the Anti-Masonic Party's supporters joined the Whig Party, which sought to unite those opposed to the policies of President Jackson. The Anti-Masons brought with them an intense distrust of politicians and a rejection of unthinking party loyalty, together with new campaign techniques to whip up excitement among the voters. The Anti-Masonic Party held a national convention in 1835, nominating Whig candidate William Henry Harrison, but a second convention announced that the party would not officially support a candidate. Harrison campaigned as a Whig in the 1836 presidential election and his relative success in the election encouraged further migration of Anti-Masons to the Whig Party. By 1840, the party had ceased to function as a national organization. In subsequent decades, former Anti-Masonic candidates and supporters such as Millard Fillmore, William H. Seward, Thurlow Weed and Thaddeus Stevens became prominent members of the Whig Party.

== History ==
=== Background ===
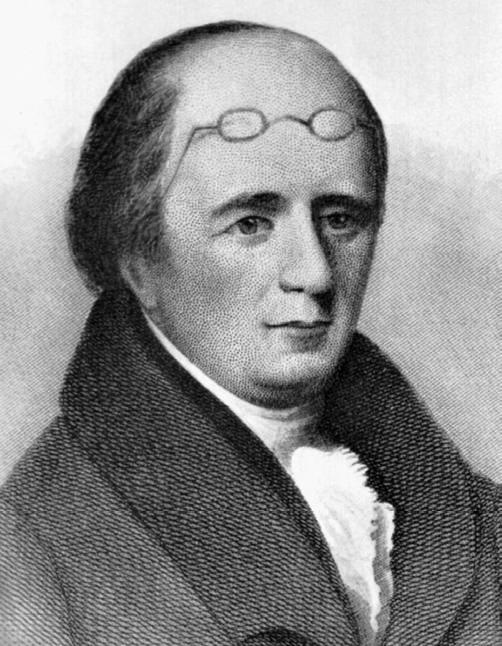
William Morgan, whose disappearance and probable murder led to creation of the Anti-Masonic Party

The opponents of Freemasonry formed a political movement after the Morgan affair convinced them the Masons were murdering men who spoke out against them. This key episode was the mysterious 1826 disappearance of William Morgan, a Freemason in upstate New York who had turned against the Masons.

Morgan claimed to have been made a member of the Masons while living in Canada and he appears to have briefly attended a lodge in Rochester. In 1825, Morgan received the Royal Arch degree at Le Roy's Western Star Chapter #33, having declared under oath that he had previously received the six degrees which preceded it. Whether he actually received these degrees and if so from where has not been determined for certain.

Morgan then attempted unsuccessfully to help establish or visit lodges and chapters in Batavia, but was denied participation in Batavia's Masonic activities by members who were uncertain about Morgan's character and claims to Masonic membership. Angered by the rejection, Morgan announced that he was going to publish an exposé titled Illustrations of Masonry, critical of the Freemasons and describing their secret degree ceremonies in detail.

When his intentions became known to the Batavia lodge, an attempt was made to burn down the business of the printer who planned to publish Morgan's book. In September 1826, Morgan was arrested on flimsy allegations of failing to repay a loan and theft of a shirt and tie in an effort to prevent publication of his book by keeping him in jail. The individual who intended to publish Morgan's book paid his bail and he was released from custody. Shortly afterwards, Morgan disappeared.

Some skeptics argued that Morgan had left the Batavia area on his own, either because he had been paid not to publish his book, or to escape Masonic retaliation for attempting to publish the book, or to generate publicity that would boost the book's sales. The generally believed version of events was that Masons killed Morgan by drowning him in the Niagara River. Whether he fled or was murdered, Morgan's disappearance led many to believe that Freemasonry was in conflict with good citizenship.

Because judges, businessmen, bankers and politicians were often Masons, ordinary citizens began to think of it as an elitist group. Moreover, many claimed that the lodges' secret oaths bound Masons to favor each other against outsiders in the courts and elsewhere.

Out of dozens of indictments for Morgan's disappearance, only ten conspirators were ever convicted, and none were sentenced to greater than three years. Upon sentencing four of the conspirators in 1827, judge and future Governor of New York, Enos T. Throop, lamented their light punishment, stating they had "created, in the people of this section of the country, a strong feeling of virtuous indignation."

Because some trials of alleged Morgan conspirators were mishandled and the Masons resisted further inquiries, many New Yorkers concluded that Masons controlled key offices and used their official authority to promote the goals of the fraternity by ensuring that Morgan's supposed killers escaped punishment. When a member sought to reveal its secrets, so ran the conclusion, the Freemasons had done away with him. Because they controlled the courts and other offices, they were considered capable of obstructing the investigation. True Americans, they said, had to organize and defeat this conspiracy. If good government was to be restored "all Masons must be purged from public office".

=== Party foundation ===
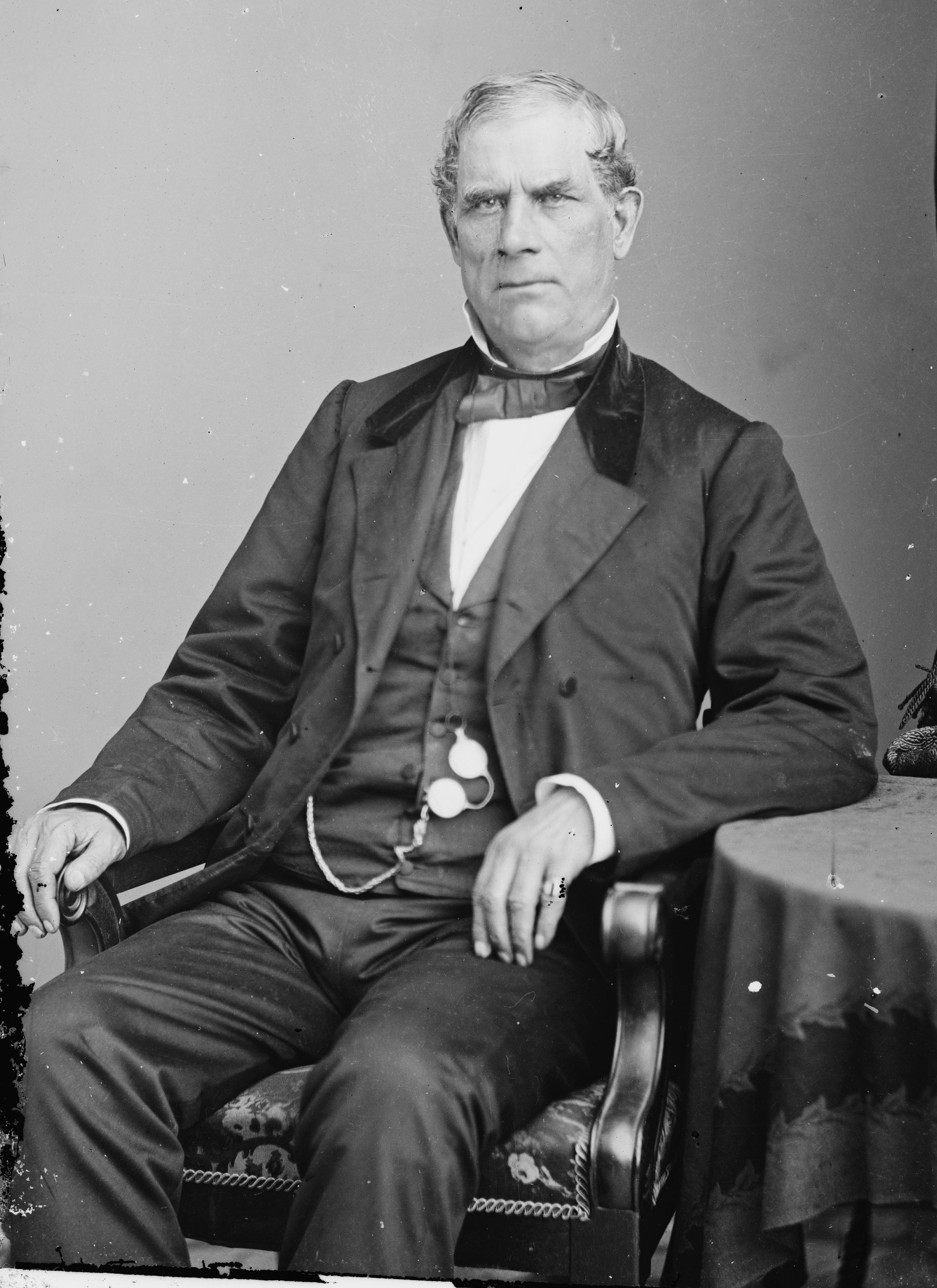
Thurlow Weed, newspaper editor who helped form the Anti-Masonic Party

The Anti-Masonic Party was formed in Upstate New York in September 1827. Anti-Masons were opponents of Freemasonry, believing that it was a corrupt and elitist secret society which was ruling much of the country in defiance of republican principles. Many people regarded the Masonic organization and its adherents involved in government as corrupt.

Opposition to Masonry was first taken up by some evangelical Protestant churches as a religious cause, particularly in the Burned-over district of upstate New York. Many churches passed resolutions condemning ministers and lay leaders who were Masons and several denominations condemned Freemasonry, including the Presbyterian, Congregational, Methodist and Baptist churches.

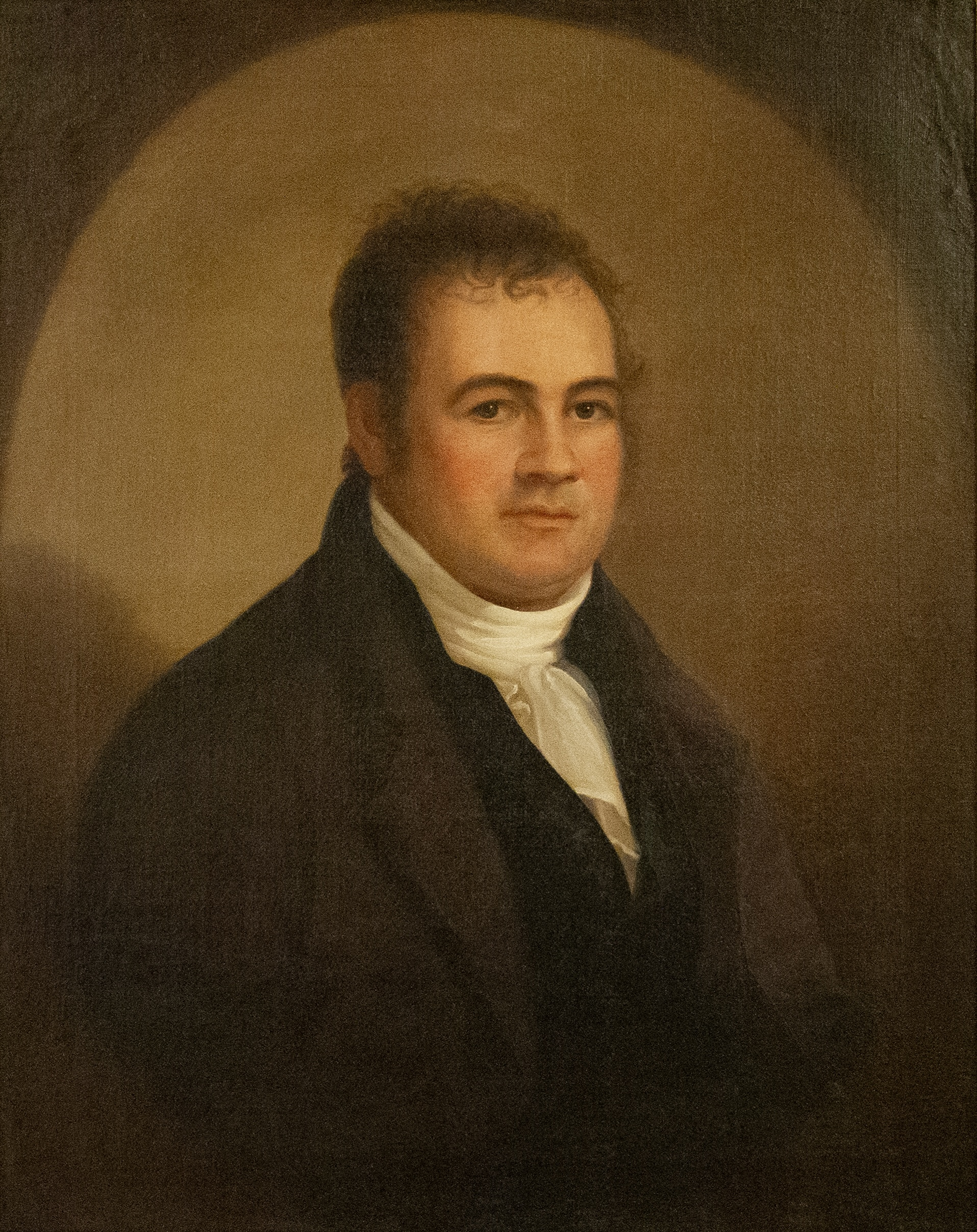
Solomon Southwick, newspaper publisher and 1828 Anti-Masonic candidate for Governor of New York

Early religious anti-Masonic sentiment sought to avoid political involvement, mostly believing it to be a corruption of Christianity. However, after the death of Morgan, many began to believe the society was harmful to the integrity of American government and elections. Anti-Masonry officially became a political issue in Western New York in early 1827, when many local mass meetings resolved not to support Masons for public office. The Anti-Masonic Party opposed Jacksonian Democracy, exemplified in New York by the Bucktails of Senator Martin Van Buren and the rival Clintonian faction of Governor DeWitt Clinton. The party also initially opposed the National Republican Party of President John Quincy Adams because it included Masons, but by 1830 the Anti-Masons had attracted many National Republicans to the fold, including Adams himself.

When the Anti-Masonic party began organizing candidates for the 1827 election of the 51st New York State Legislature, the anti-Jackson National Republicans gave up in regions where Anti-Masonic sentiment was highest, which led to Anti-Masons gaining 15 of 125 assembly seats. The alleged remark of Anti-Masonic organizer Thurlow Weed (which Weed denied), that an unidentified corpse found in the Niagara River was "a good enough Morgan" until after the 1828 elections, summarized the value of the Morgan disappearance for Jackson's opponents.

=== Political rise ===
In the elections of 1828, the new party proved unexpectedly strong, securing three of eight available State Senate seats as well as five seats in the United States House of Representatives. The party's candidate for governor of New York, Solomon Southwick, was defeated, partially due to attacks on his character by Thurlow Weed. Despite this, the Anti-Masonic Party became the main opposition party to the Jacksonian Democrats in New York. In this effort, they were aided by the fact that president-elect Andrew Jackson was a high-ranking Mason and frequently spoke in praise of the organization. Having established itself as a major political force, the party broadened its issues base in 1829, when it became a champion of internal improvements and the protective tariff.

Anti-Masonic Party members expanded the use of party-affiliated newspapers for political organizing by publishing over 100, including Southwick's National Observer and Weed's Anti-Masonic Enquirer. By 1829, Weed's Albany Journal had become the preeminent Anti-Masonic paper and it later became the leading Whig newspaper. The newspapers of the time reveled in partisanship and one brief paragraph in an Albany Journal article opposing Martin Van Buren included the words "dangerous", "demagogue", "corrupt", "degrade", "pervert", "prostitute", "debauch" and "cursed".

=== Conventions and elections ===
A national Anti-Masonic organization was planned as early as 1827, when the New York leaders attempted unsuccessfully to persuade Henry Clay to renounce his Masonic membership and head the movement.

By 1830, the Anti-Masonic movement's effort to broaden its appeal enabled it to spread to neighboring states, becoming especially strong in Pennsylvania and Vermont. In 1831, William A. Palmer was elected governor of Vermont on an Anti-Masonic ticket, an office he held until 1835. Palmer's brother-in-law Augustine Clarke was an Anti-Masonic presidential elector in 1832, served as Vermont state treasurer from 1833 to 1837 and was appointed to the Anti-Masonic National Committee in 1837. Other Vermont Anti-Masonic electors in 1832 included former governor Ezra Butler and former United States representative William Strong.

The highest elected office held by a member of the Anti-Masonic Party was governor. Besides Palmer in Vermont, Joseph Ritner was the governor of Pennsylvania from 1835 to 1839.

In addition to Palmer and Ritner, Silas H. Jennison, an Anti-Mason, was elected Lieutenant Governor of Vermont with Whig support in 1835. No candidate, including Palmer, received a majority of votes for governor as required by the Vermont Constitution. The contest then moved to the Vermont General Assembly, which could not choose a winner. The General Assembly then opted to allow Jennison to act as governor until the next election. He won election as governor in his own right as a Whig in 1836 and served from 1836 to 1841.

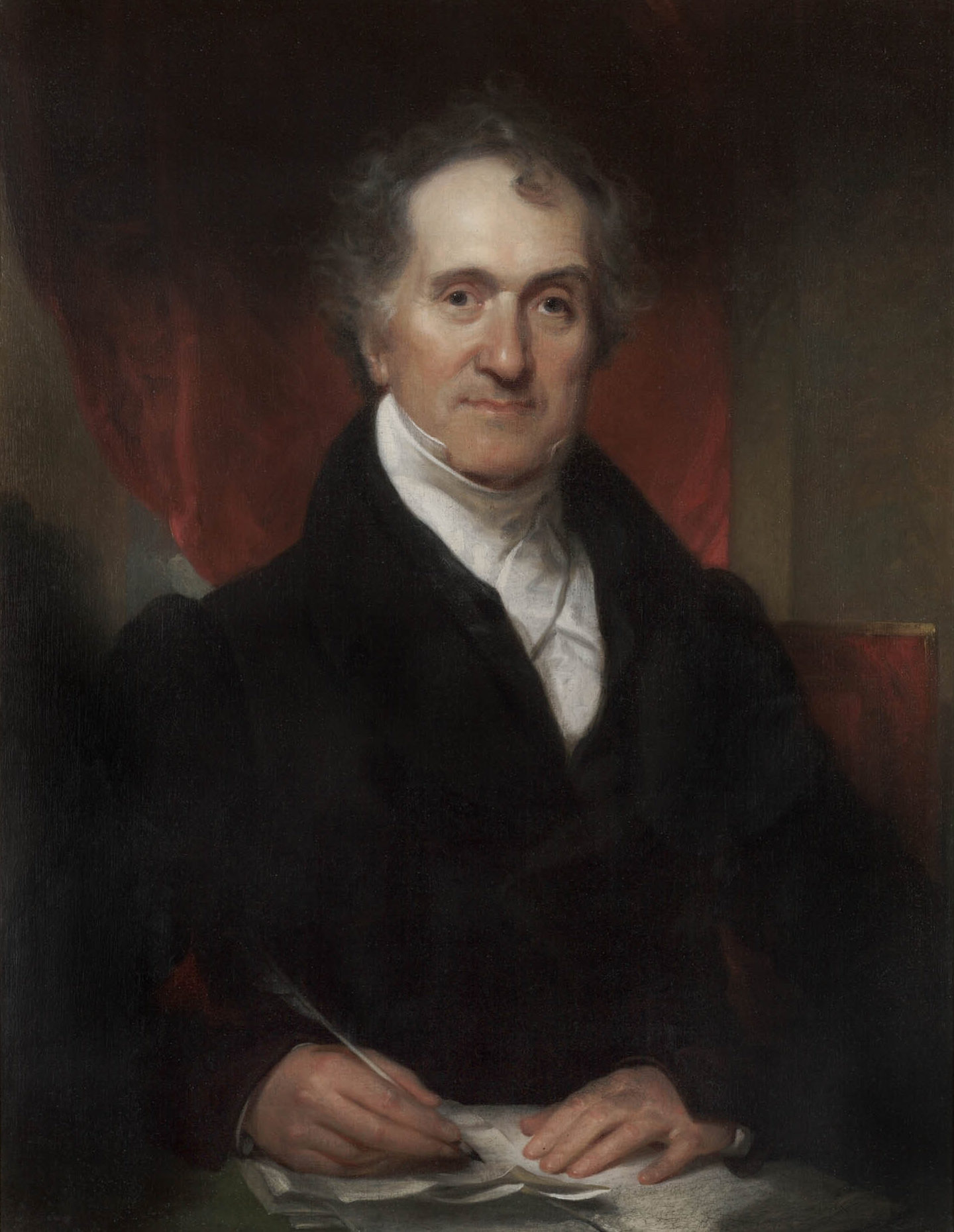
Former Mason William Wirt won Vermont's Electoral College votes in the 1832 presidential election for the Anti-Masonic Party

Though the Anti-Masonic Party elected no senators and controlled no houses of a state legislature, Anti-Masons in state legislatures sometimes formed coalitions to elect senators and organize their chambers. Examples include: William Wilkins, elected to the Senate in 1830 by a coalition of pro-Adams Democrats and Anti-Masons in the Pennsylvania General Assembly; and William Sprague, elected speaker of the Rhode Island House of Representatives in 1831 by a coalition of pro-Adams Democrats and Anti-Masons.

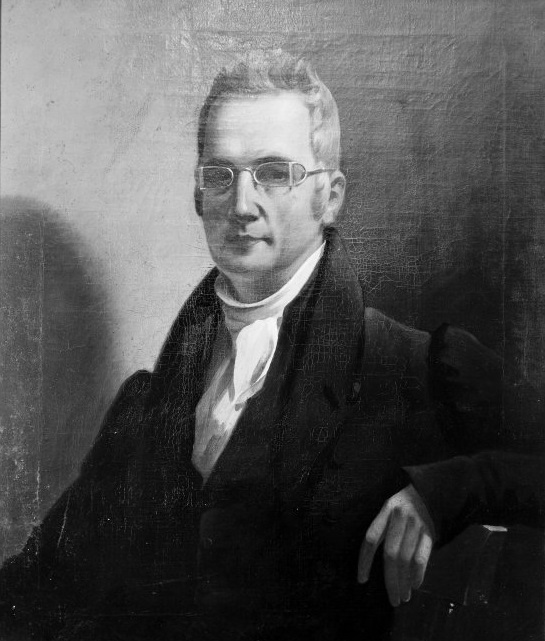
Amos Ellmaker, 1832 Anti-Masonic candidate for Vice President

The Anti-Masonic Party conducted the first presidential nominating convention in the United States history for the 1832 elections, nominating William Wirt (a former Mason) for president and Amos Ellmaker for vice president in Baltimore. Wirt won 7.8 percent of the popular vote and the seven electoral votes of Vermont. Soon the Democrats and Whigs recognized the convention's value in managing parties and campaigns and began to hold their own.

Following Ritner's election in 1835, a state convention was held in Harrisburg on December 14–17, 1835 to choose presidential electors for the 1836 election. The convention nominated William Henry Harrison for president and Francis Granger for vice president. The Vermont state Anti-Masonic convention followed suit on February 24, 1836. Anti-Masonic leaders were unable to obtain assurance from Harrison that he was not a Mason, so they called a national convention. The second national Anti-Masonic nominating convention was held in Philadelphia on May 4, 1836. The meeting was divisive, but a majority of the delegates officially stated that the party was not sponsoring a national ticket for 1836 and proposed a meeting in 1837 to discuss the future of the party.

Although Harrison lost the election to Democratic candidate Martin Van Buren in 1836, his strength throughout the North was hailed by Anti-Masonic leaders because the Anti-Masonic Party was the first to officially place his name in contention. By the mid-1830s, other Anti-Jacksonians had coalesced into the Whig Party. By the late 1830s, many of the Anti-Masonic movement's members were moving to the Whigs, regarding that party as a better alternative to the Jacksonians, by then called Democrats. The Anti-Masonic Party held a conference in September 1837 to discuss its situation—one delegate was former president John Quincy Adams.

The Anti-Masonic Party held a third national nominating convention at Temperance Hall in Philadelphia on November 13–14, 1838. By this time, the party had been almost entirely supplanted by the Whigs. The Anti-Masons unanimously endorsed William Henry Harrison for president and Daniel Webster for vice president in the 1840 election. When the Whig National Convention nominated Harrison with John Tyler as his running mate, the Anti-Masonic Party did not make an alternate nomination and ceased to function, with most adherents being fully absorbed into the Whigs by 1840.

== Legacy ==
Because the Anti-Masonic Party was absorbed into the Whig Party, its attempts to expand its political platform have been often overshadowed by its foundational commitment to the claim that Masonic elites were attempting to secretly control the government.

During the Industrial Revolution, increased economic mobility, westward migration, and the addition of new states to the Union were thought of by many as weakening longstanding family and community ties—perceptions that contributed to the growth of the Anti-Masonic movement. Because Freemasonry was one of the institutions that remained stable during this time of change, it became a target for protesters. As a result, the Morgan Affair became the highly visible catalyst that turned a popular sentiment into a political party.

Under the banner of Anti-Masonry, a collective of Anti-Jacksonians and others discontented with existing political conditions formed the earliest United States third party. The fact that William Wirt, their choice for the presidency in 1832, was a Mason and announced so before the convention that nominated him, suggests that opposition to Masonry was not the movement's sole issue.

Anti-Masonic attempts at platform expansion aided in the rise of the Whig Party as the major alternative to the Democrats, with Anti-Masonic positions on issues including internal improvements and tariffs being adopted by the Whigs. In addition, the Anti-Masonic movement introduced or expanded several innovations that became accepted practice among other parties, including nominating conventions and party newspapers.

== Second Anti-Masonic Party ==
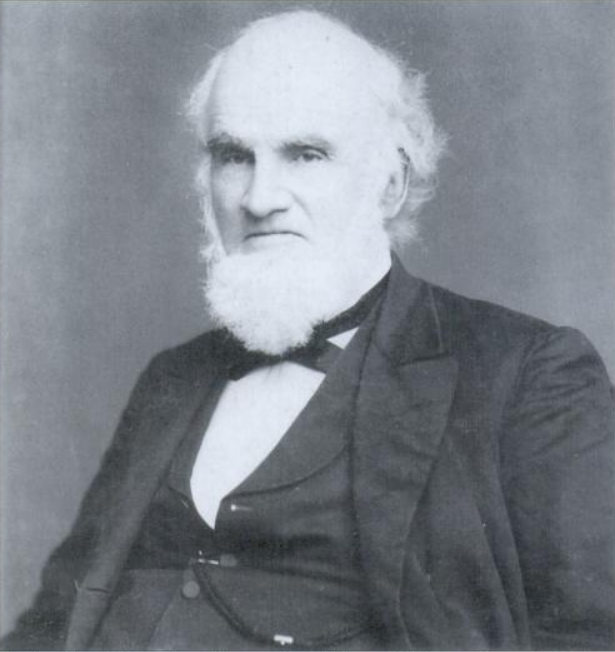
Jonathan Blanchard, founder of the Anti-Masonic Party's second incarnation

A later political organization called the Anti-Masonic Party, or American Party, was active from 1872 until 1884. This second group had a more religious basis for its anti-Masonry, and was founded by the National Christian Association (NCA) and Jonathan Blanchard of Wheaton College. The party nominated candidates in four United States presidential elections but only participated in two before eventually merging into the Prohibition Party.

At their 1872 convention in Oberlin, Ohio, Charles Francis Adams was nominated for president, with General Charles Henry Howard as his running mate. Howard declined, and Joseph Lorenzo Barlow was nominated in his stead. However, upon the discovery that Adams was a Royal Arch Mason, the party withdrew their ticket for the election.

After the embarrassment of the 1872 ticket, the party only nominated close associates of their founder and president, Johnathan Blanchard, at the cost of national notoriety. In the 1876 election, Blanchard's Wheaton colleague, Reverend James Walker, was nominated with running mate Donald Kirkpatrick of New York. Blanchard's cousin, John W. Phelps, was nominated alongside Samuel C. Pomeroy for the election of 1880. Neither ticket received more than 1,100 votes nation-wide.

In 1884, the party nominated Blanchard and Pomeroy, but merged with the Prohibition Party's ticket of John St. John and William Daniel before the election could be held.

This second incarnation of the party was also responsible for erecting a memorial to William Morgan in the Batavia Cemetery in 1882.

== Members of Congress ==
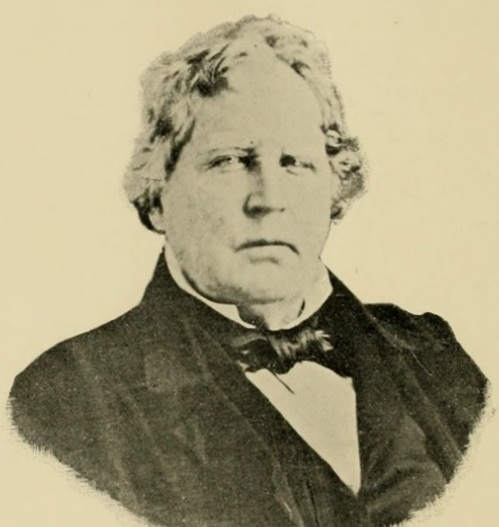
Grattan H. Wheeler, Anti-Masonic congressman from New York

The Anti-Masons did not elect anyone to the Senate, partly due to never controlling any state legislatures, but elected several members of the House of Representatives.

Massachusetts

- William Jackson
- John Reed Jr.

New York

- William Babcock
- Gamaliel H. Barstow
- Timothy Childs
- John A. Collier
- Bates Cooke
- John Dickson
- Philo C. Fuller
- Gideon Hard
- Abner Hazeltine
- George W. Lay
- Henry C. Martindale
- Robert S. Rose
- Phineas L. Tracy
- Grattan H. Wheeler
- Frederick Whittlesey

Ohio

- Jonathan Sloane

Pennsylvania

- Robert Allison
- John Banks
- Charles Augustus Barnitz
- Richard Biddle
- George Chambers
- William Clark
- Edward Darlington
- Edward Davies
- Harmar Denny
- John Edwards
- Thomas Henry
- William Hiester
- Francis James
- Thomas McKean
- Charles Ogle
- David Potts Jr.
- Andrew Stewart

Rhode Island

- Dutee Jerauld Pearce

Vermont

- William Cahoon
- Benjamin F. Deming
- Henry Fisk Janes
- William Slade

== Office holders and candidates ==
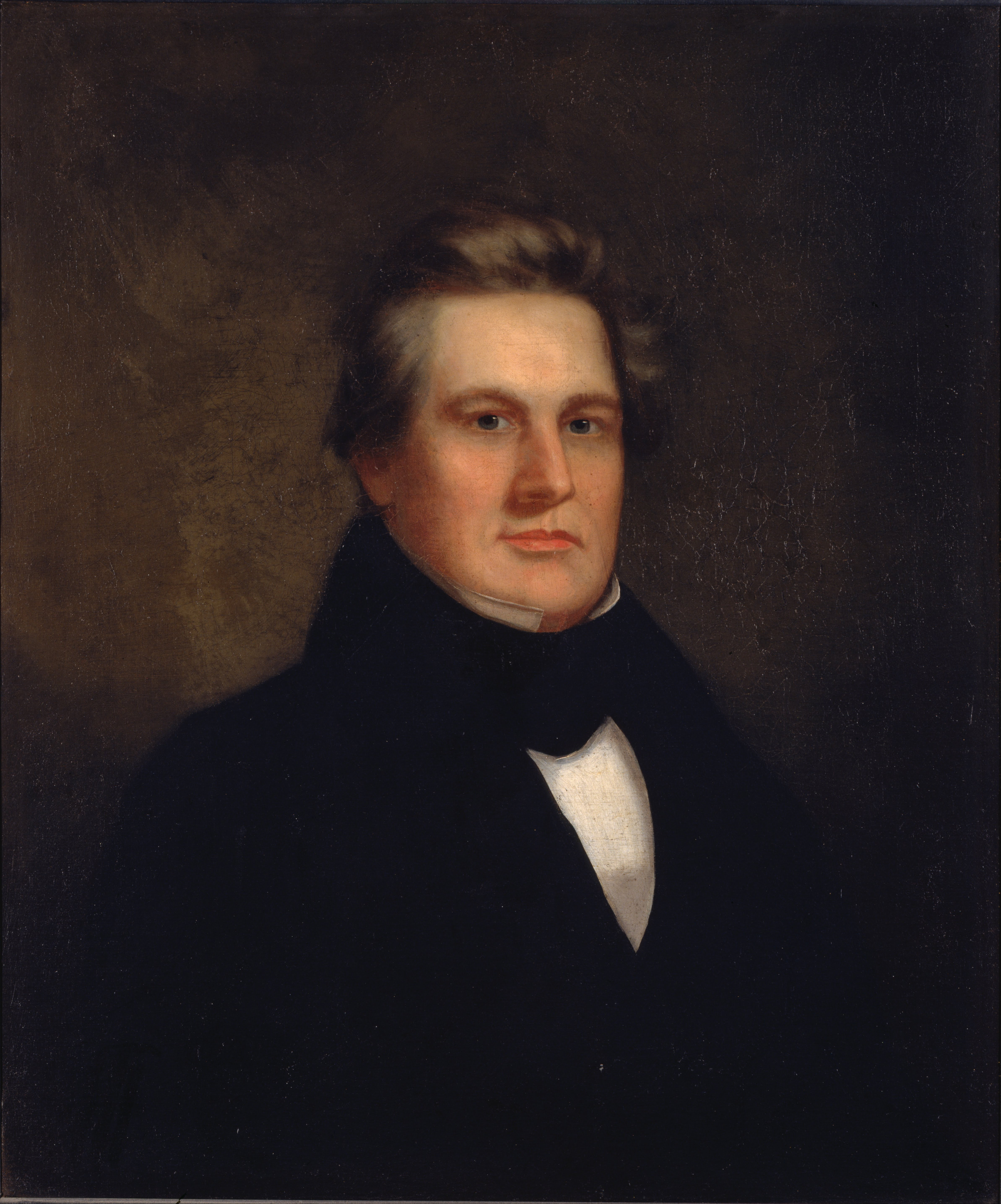
President Millard Fillmore's political career began as an Anti-Masonic member of the New York State Assembly in 1829

- Solomon Southwick, candidate for Governor of New York (1828)
- Millard Fillmore, New York State Assembly (1829–1831)
- William H. Seward, New York State Senate (1831–1834)
- Lebbeus Egerton, Lieutenant Governor of Vermont (1831–1835)
- William A. Palmer, Governor of Vermont (1831–1835)
- William Wirt, candidate for President in 1832
- Amos Ellmaker, candidate for Vice President in 1832
- William Sprague III, Speaker of the Rhode Island House of Representatives (1832–1835)
- Thaddeus Stevens, Pennsylvania House of Representatives (1833–1835)
- Augustine Clarke, Vermont State Treasurer (1833–1837)
- Joseph Ritner, Governor of Pennsylvania (1835–1839)
- Silas H. Jennison, Governor of Vermont (1835–1841) and Anti-Mason running with Whig support who later became a Whig
- John Quincy Adams, candidate for Governor of Massachusetts in 1833
- Allen Wardner, Vermont State Treasurer (1837–1838)
- Jonathan Blanchard, candidate for president in 1884

== Electoral history ==
=== Presidential elections ===
Election	Candidate	Running mate	Votes	Vote %	Electoral votes	+/-	Outcome of election
1828 (Note: Endorsed National Republican Party candidate John Quincy Adams for President and Richard Rush for Vice President.)	Not presented						
1832	William Wirt	Amos Ellmaker	100,715	7.8	7 / 286	New	Lost
1836 (Note: Endorsed Whig Party candidate William Henry Harrison for President and Francis Granger for Vice President.)	Not presented						
1840 (Note: Initially endorsed Whig Party candidate Harrison for President and Daniel Webster for Vice President, it fully merged into the Whig Party following the election.)	Not presented						
1880	John W. Phelps	Samuel C. Pomeroy	1,045	nil	0 / 369	0	Lost

=== Congressional elections ===
United States House of Representatives
Election year	No. of overall seats won	+/–	House Speaker
1828-1829	5 / 213	New	Andrew Stevenson
1830-1831	17 / 213	▲12	Andrew Stevenson
1832-1833	25 / 240	▲8	Andrew Stevenson
1834-1835	16 / 242	▼9	James K. Polk
1836-1837	7 / 242	▼9	James K. Polk
1838-1839	6 / 242	▼1	John W. Jones

United States Senate
Election year	No. of overall seats won	+/–	Senate President
1828/1829	0 / 48	New	John C. Calhoun
1830/1831	0 / 48	0	John C. Calhoun
1832/1833	0 / 48	0	Vacant (Note: Office left vacant when Calhoun resigned to become Senator on December 28, 1832.)
1834/1835	0 / 48	0	Martin Van Buren
1836/1837	0 / 52	0	Martin Van Buren
1838/1839	0 / 52	0	Richard M. Johnson

== Sources and further reading ==
- Bemis, Samuel Flagg. John Quincy Adams and the union (1956) vol 2 pp 273–304.
- Brodie, Fawn (1966) [1959]. Thaddeus Stevens: Scourge of the South (Norton Library ed.). New York: W.W. Norton & Co., Inc. ISBN 0-393-00331-0.
- Cooper, William J. (2017). The Lost Founding Father: John Quincy Adams and the Transformation of American Politics. Liveright Publishing. ISBN 978-1631493898.
- Formisano, Ronald P. (2008). For the People: American Populist Movements from the Revolution to the 1850s. Chapel Hill: University of North Carolina Press. ISBN 978-0-8078-3172-4.
- Formisano, Ronald P.; Kutolowski, Kathleen Smith (1977). "Antimasonry and Masonry: The Genesis of Protest, 1826–1827". American Quarterly. 29 (2): 139–165. doi:10.2307/2712356. JSTOR 2712356.
- Goodman, Paul. Towards a Christian republic: Antimasonry and the great transition in New England 1826–1836 (Oxford University Press, 1988).
- Holt, Michael F. "The Antimasonic and Know Nothing Parties," in History of U.S. Political Parties, ed. Arthur M. Schlesinger Jr. (4 vols., New York, 1973), vol I, 575–620.
- Jamele, John F. (1991), The Antimasonic Party in Massachusetts, 1826–1835, College Park, MD: University of Maryland Library.
- McCarthy, Charles (1903), The Antimasonic Party: A Study of Political Antimasonry in the United States, 1827–1840, Washington: Government Printing Office, reprinted from Annual Report of the American Historical Association, vol. 1, 1902, pp. 365–574.
- Nathans, Sydney (1973), Daniel Webster and Jacksonian Democracy, Baltimore, MD: Johns Hopkins University Press, ISBN 978-0-8018-1246-0.
- Ratcliffe, Donald J. "Antimasonry and Partisanship in Greater New England, 1826–1836." Journal of the Early Republic 15.2 (1995): 199–239.
- Ratner, Lorman. Antimasonry; the Crusade and the Party (1969) online
- Rayback, Robert J. Millard Fillmore: Biography of a President. Buffalo Historical Society. 1959. online
- Rupp, Robert O. "Parties and the public good: political Antimasonry in New York reconsidered." Journal of the Early Republic 8.3 (1988): 253–279. online
- Shade, William. "Review: The Elder Goodman's 'Light on Antimasonry'?" Reviews in American History (1989) 17#1 pp. 58–63 in jstor;
- Stahr, Walter (2012). Seward : Lincoln's indispensable man. New York: Simon & Schuster. ISBN 978-1-4391-2118-4.
- Trefousse, Hans L. Thaddeus Stevens: Nineteenth-Century Egalitarian. University of North Carolina Press. 1997.
- Vaughn, William Preston (1983) The Antimasonic Party in the United States, 1826–1843. University Press of Kentucky. ISBN 0-8131-1474-8, the standard history. online
- Van Deusen, Glyndon G. Thurlow Weed, Wizard of the Lobby (1947) online.
