= Jeremiah Brown (politician) =

American politician

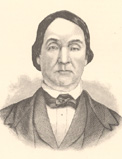
Jeremiah Brown

Jeremiah Brown (April 14, 1785 – March 2, 1858) was a Whig member of the U.S. House of Representatives from Pennsylvania.

== Biography ==
Jeremiah Brown was born in Little Britain Township, Pennsylvania. He engaged in milling and agricultural pursuits. He served as a member of the Pennsylvania House of Representatives in 1826. He was a delegate to the convention to revise the State constitution in 1836.

Brown was elected as a Whig to the Twenty-seventh and Twenty-eighth Congresses. He was not a candidate for renomination in 1844. He served as first associate judge for Lancaster and served from 1851 to 1856. He died in Goshen, Pennsylvania, in 1858. Interment in the cemetery adjoining Penn Hill Quaker Meeting House in Little Britain Township.

== Sources ==
- United States Congress. "Jeremiah Brown (id: B000925)". Biographical Directory of the United States Congress.
- The Political Graveyard

U.S. House of Representatives
Preceded by Francis James; John Edwards; Edward Davies	Member of the U.S. House of Representatives from Pennsylvania's 4th congressional district 1841–1843 alongside: Francis James and John Edwards	Succeeded by Charles J. Ingersoll
Preceded by Peter Newhard	Member of the U.S. House of Representatives from Pennsylvania's 8th congressional district 1843–1845	Succeeded by John Strohm
