= Francis James (American politician) =

American politician (1799–1886)

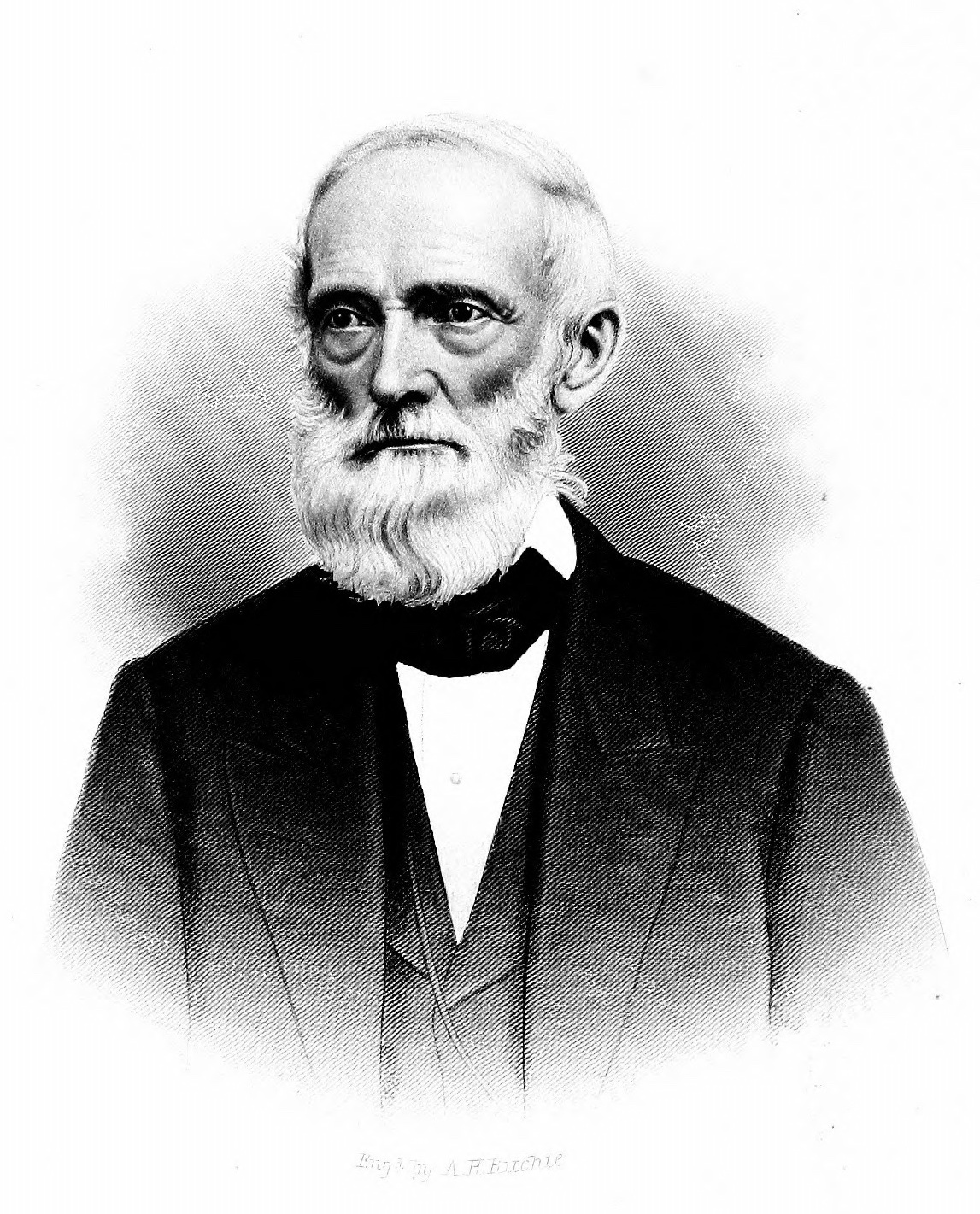

Member of the U.S. House of Representatives from Pennsylvania's 4th district
- In office March 4, 1839 – March 3, 1843
- Preceded by: See below
- Succeeded by: Charles Jared Ingersoll

Member of the Pennsylvania Senate for the 4th district
- In office 1835-1836
- Preceded by: George C. Smith
- Succeeded by: Samuel A. Smith

Personal details
- Born: April 4, 1799 Thornbury Township, Chester County, Pennsylvania
- Died: January 4, 1886 (aged 86) West Chester, Pennsylvania
- Resting place: Oaklands Cemetery, West Chester, Pennsylvania
- Party: Anti-Masonic; Whig

Francis James (April 4, 1799 – January 4, 1886) was an American politician from Pennsylvania who was an Anti-Masonic and Whig member of the U.S. House of Representatives for Pennsylvania's 4th congressional district from 1839 to 1843.

== Biography ==
Francis James was born in Thornbury Township, Chester County, Pennsylvania. He attended the local public schools and Gauses' Academy. He began reading law in 1823 and gained admittance to the bar of Chester County, Pennsylvania in May 1825. He commenced practice in West Chester, Pennsylvania. He married Sarah H. James of Westtown Township, Pennsylvania, on September 7, 1826, and had one daughter, Anna M. James. He was elected to the Pennsylvania State Senate for the 4th district, serving from 1835 to 1836, and again for the 3rd district, serving from 1837 to 1838.

In October 1838, James was elected as an Anti-Mason to the 26th U.S. Congress and in 1840 reelected as a Whig to the 27th Congress. He served from March 4, 1839 to March 3, 1843. During his second term, Representative James chaired the House Committee on Revisal and Unfinished Business. According to J. Smith Futhey and Gilbert Cope (1881), while in Congress James "took a strong anti-slavery position and by speech and vote resisted the encroachments of the slave power."

After departing from Congress, he resumed his legal practice in West Chester and served as the borough's chief burgess in 1850. He died in West Chester on January 4, 1886, and is interred at Oaklands Cemetery.

U.S. House of Representatives
Preceded by David Potts Jr. Edward Darlington; Edward Davies	Member of the U.S. House of Representatives from Pennsylvania's 4th congressional district 1839–1843 1839–1841 alongside: John Edwards and Edward Davies; 1841–1843 alongside: Jeremiah Brown and John Edwards	Succeeded by Charles Jared Ingersoll
