= 1838 Pennsylvania's 9th congressional district special election =

On March 8, 1838, a special election was held in Pennsylvania's 9th congressional district to fill a vacancy left by the resignation of Henry A. P. Muhlenberg (D) on February 9, 1838.

== Election results ==
Candidate	Party	Votes	Percent
George M. Keim	Democratic	2,599	96.8%
Scattering		85	3.2%

Keim took his seat on March 17, 1838 during the 2nd session of the 25th Congress.

== See also ==
- List of special elections to the United States House of Representatives
