= Edward Burd Hubley =

American politician (1792–1856)

Edward B. Hubley

Member of the U.S. House of Representatives from Pennsylvania's 8th district
- In office March 4, 1835 – March 3, 1839
- Preceded by: Henry King
- Succeeded by: Peter Newhard

Personal details
- Born: 1792 Reading, Pennsylvania, U.S.
- Died: February 23, 1856 (aged 63–64) Philadelphia, Pennsylvania, U.S.
- Resting place: Charles Evans Cemetery
- Party: Jacksonian; Democratic

Edward Burd Hubley (1792 – February 23, 1856) was a member of the U.S. House of Representatives from Pennsylvania.

== Biography ==
Edward B. Hubley was born in Reading, Pennsylvania, in 1792. He studied law, was admitted to the bar in 1820 and began his legal practice in Reading. He subsequently moved to Orwigsburg, Pennsylvania, which was the county seat of Schuylkill County, Pennsylvania.

Hubley was elected as a Jacksonian to the Twenty-fourth Congress and reelected as a Democrat to the Twenty-fifth Congress.

He served as canal commissioner of Pennsylvania from 1839 to 1842, and was appointed, on November 8, 1842, as a commissioner to adjust and settle certain claims under the treaty with the Cherokee Indians of 1835.

He then resumed the practice of law in Reading and later moved to Philadelphia, where he died in 1856. He was interred in the Charles Evans Cemetery in Reading, Pennsylvania.

U.S. House of Representatives
Preceded by Henry King	Member of the U.S. House of Representatives from Pennsylvania's 8th congressional district 1835–1839	Succeeded by Peter Newhard
