= George Gray Leiper =

American politician

George G. Leiper
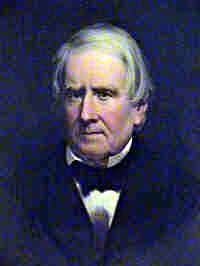

Member of the U.S. House of Representatives from Pennsylvania's 4th district
- In office March 4, 1829 – March 3, 1831
- Preceded by: James Buchanan; Samuel Anderson; Charles Miner
- Succeeded by: William Muhlenberg Hiester; Joshua Evans Jr. David Potts Jr.

Personal details
- Born: George Gray Leiper; February 3, 1786 Philadelphia, Pennsylvania
- Died: November 18, 1868 (aged 82) Delaware County, Pennsylvania
- Resting place: Ridley Presbyterian Church Cemetery in Ridley Township, Pennsylvania
- Party: Jacksonian
- Education: University of Pennsylvania

George Gray Leiper (February 3, 1786 – November 18, 1868) was a Jacksonian member of the U.S. House of Representatives from Pennsylvania, serving one term from 1829 to 1831.

== Biography ==
Born in Philadelphia, Pennsylvania on February 3, 1786, George Gray Leiper was a son of businessman Thomas Leiper. Educated in his community's common schools and an 1803 graduate of the University of Pennsylvania, he relocated in 1810 to Ridley Township, Delaware County, Pennsylvania, which was known at the time as "Lapidea." While there, he engaged in logging. He also operated bark mills and stone quarries.

In 1814, Leiper served as a first lieutenant with the Delaware County Fencibles, and performed his duties near Brandywine Creek.

=== Congress ===
A member of the Pennsylvania House of Representatives in 1822 and 1823, he was elected as a Jacksonian to the Twenty-first Congress, during which time, he was the chair of the United States House Committee on Expenditures in the Department of the Treasury.

=== Later career ===
He was not a candidate for renomination in 1830, but, instead, resumed the management of his quarry properties. He was then appointed as an associate judge of the courts of Delaware County on February 25, 1843. Reappointed to that position on February 16, 1848, he served until December 1, 1851, when the office became elective.

== Death and interment ==
Leiper died at his home, “Lapidea,” on Crum Creek in Delaware County, Pennsylvania on November 18, 1868, and was interred in the Ridley Presbyterian Church Cemetery in Ridley Township, Pennsylvania.

== See also ==
- Thomas Leiper Estate – his father's estate on Crum Creek

U.S. House of Representatives
Preceded by James Buchanan; Samuel Anderson; Charles Miner	Member of the U.S. House of Representatives from Pennsylvania's 4th congressional district 1829–1831 alongside: James Buchanan and Joshua Evans, Jr.	Succeeded by William Muhlenberg Hiester; Joshua Evans, Jr. David Potts, Jr.
