= John Edwards (Pennsylvania politician) =

American politician

Member of the U.S. House of Representatives from Pennsylvania's 4th district
- In office March 4, 1839 – March 3, 1843
- Preceded by: See below
- Succeeded by: Charles Jared Ingersoll

Personal details
- Born: 1786 Ivy Mills, Pennsylvania
- Died: June 26, 1843 (aged 56–57) Glen Mills, Pennsylvania
- Party: Anti-Masonic; Whig

John Edwards (1786 – June 26, 1843) was an Anti-Masonic and Whig member of the U.S. House of Representatives from Pennsylvania.

== Biography ==
John Edwards (granduncle of John E. Leonard) was born in Glen Mills, Pennsylvania. He studied law, was admitted to the bar in 1807 and commenced practice in Chester, Pennsylvania. He was deputy attorney general for Delaware County, Pennsylvania, in 1811. He moved to West Chester, Pennsylvania, in 1825 and shortly thereafter engaged in the manufacture of iron and later of nails near Glen Mills, Pennsylvania.

Edwards was elected as an Anti-Masonic candidate to the Twenty-sixth Congress and reelected as a Whig to the Twenty-seventh Congress. After his time in congress, he resumed his former manufacturing pursuits, and died on his estate near Glen Mills in 1843. Interment in the Friends' (Hicksite) Cemetery of the Middletown Friends Meetinghouse in Middletown Township, Delaware County, Pennsylvania.

== Sources ==
- United States Congress. "John Edwards (id: E000074)". Biographical Directory of the United States Congress.
- The Political Graveyard

U.S. House of Representatives
Preceded by David Potts, Jr. Edward Darlington; Edward Davies	Member of the U.S. House of Representatives from Pennsylvania's 4th congressional district 1839–1843 1839–1841 alongside: Francis James and Edward Davies; 1841–1843 alongside: Jeremiah Brown and Francis James	Succeeded by Charles J. Ingersoll
