= David Potts Jr. =

American politician (1794–1863)

David Potts Jr. (November 27, 1794 – June 1, 1863) was an Anti-Masonic member of the U.S. House of Representatives from Pennsylvania.

== Biography ==
Potts was born at Warwick Furnace, Pennsylvania, about eight miles from Pottstown, Pennsylvania. He became an ironmaster, and owner and manager of Warwick Furnace. He was a member of the Pennsylvania House of Representatives from 1824 to 1826.

He was elected as an Anti-Masonic candidate to the Twenty-second and to the three succeeding Congresses. He was not a candidate for renomination in 1838. Potts resumed his former business pursuits, and died at Warwick Furnace. Interment in Coventry Cemetery near Warwick.

== Sources ==
- United States Congress. "David Potts Jr. (id: P000472)". Biographical Directory of the United States Congress.
- The Political Graveyard

U.S. House of Representatives
Preceded by James Buchanan; Joshua Evans Jr. George G. Leiper	Member of the U.S. House of Representatives from Pennsylvania's 4th congressional district 1831–1839 1831–1833 alongside: William Hiester and Joshua Evans Jr. 1833–1837 alongside: William Hiester and Edward Darlington; 1837–1839 alongside: Edward Darlington and Edward Davies	Succeeded by John Edwards; Francis James; Edward Davies
