= Peter Newhard =

American politician

Peter Newhard (July 26, 1783 – February 19, 1860) was an American politician from Pennsylvania who served as a Democratic member of the U.S. House of Representatives for Pennsylvania's 8th congressional district from 1839 to 1843.

== Biography ==
Newhard was born in Allentown, Pennsylvania. He is credited with opening the hardware store in Allentown in 1812. He served as street commissioner of the borough of Allentown in 1812, and coroner of Lehigh County, Pennsylvania, in 1816 and 1817. He was elected to the Pennsylvania House of Representatives in 1817, 1818, 1819, 1824, 1825, and 1829, the term then being one year.

He was a member of the Pennsylvania State Senate for the 12th district from 1833 to 1836. He served as chairman of the town council in 1824 and again in 1837.

Newhard was elected as a Democrat to the Twenty-sixth and Twenty-seventh Congresses. He was not a candidate for renomination in 1842. He served as burgess in 1843 and trustee of Allentown Academy in 1822, 1826, and 1843. He died in Allentown in 1860.

== Sources ==
- United States Congress. "Peter Newhard (id: N000068)". Biographical Directory of the United States Congress.
- Peter Newhard at The Political Graveyard

Pennsylvania House of Representatives
Preceded by	Member of the Pennsylvania House of Representatives; 1817, 1818, 1819, 1824, 1825 and 1829	Succeeded by
Pennsylvania State Senate
Preceded by Jacob Kern	Member of the Pennsylvania Senate, 12th district 1833-1836	Succeeded by Peter S. Michler
U.S. House of Representatives
Preceded by Edward Burd Hubley	Member of the U.S. House of Representatives from Pennsylvania's 8th congressional district 1839–1843	Succeeded by Jeremiah Brown
