= Joshua Evans Jr. =

American politician (1777–1846)

Joshua Evans Jr. (January 20, 1777 – October 2, 1846) was a Jacksonian member of the U.S. House of Representatives from Pennsylvania, serving two terms from 1829 to 1833.

== Family and early life ==
Evans was born in Paoli, Pennsylvania. He was a hotel keeper and also engaged in agricultural pursuits. He married Lydia Davis 29 February 1808.

== Political career ==
=== Early political activities ===
He served as a member of the Pennsylvania House of Representatives in 1820. He was appointed the first postmaster of Paoli on December 9, 1826, and served until February 13, 1830.

He was the president of the Tredyffrin Township, Pennsylvania, school board from 1836 to 1846. He served as brigadier general of the State militia.

=== Congress ===
Evans was elected as a Jacksonian to the Twenty-first and Twenty-second Congresses. He was not a candidate for renomination in 1832.

== Later career and death ==
He resumed his former business pursuits and died in Paoli in 1846. Interment in the cemetery of the Great Valley Baptist Church in New Centerville, Pennsylvania.

U.S. House of Representatives
Preceded by James Buchanan; Samuel Anderson; Charles Miner	Member of the U.S. House of Representatives from Pennsylvania's 4th congressional district 1829–1833 1829–1831 alongside: James Buchanan and George G. Leiper; 1831–1833 alongside: William Hiester and David Potts Jr.	Succeeded by William Hiester; Edward Darlington; David Potts Jr.
