= Edward Darlington =

American politician

Member of the U.S. House of Representatives from Pennsylvania's 4th district
- In office March 4, 1833 – March 3, 1839
- Preceded by: See below
- Succeeded by: See below

Personal details
- Born: September 17, 1795 Middletown Township, Delaware County, Pennsylvania, U.S.
- Died: November 21, 1884 (aged 89) Media, Pennsylvania, U.S.
- Party: Anti-Masonic

Edward Darlington (September 17, 1795 – November 21, 1884) was a three term member of the U.S. House of Representatives from Pennsylvania from the Anti-Masonic Party. His cousins Isaac Darlington and William Darlington were also both members of the U.S. House of Representatives from Pennsylvania.

Edward Darlington was born in Middletown Township, Pennsylvania and grew up on a dairy farm. He taught school from 1817 to 1820. He studied law with Samuel Edwards and was admitted to the bar in 1821 and entered practice in Chester, Pennsylvania.

In 1824, Darlington was appointed deputy attorney general for Delaware County and served until 1830.

In 1832, Darlington was elected as a member of the Anti-Masonic Party to the 23rd United States Congress.

In 1834, he was re-elected to the same office in the 24th United States Congress. Darlington served in Congress from 1833 to 1839. He was chairman of the United States House Committee on Expenditures on Public Buildings during the Twenty-fourth Congress. He was not a candidate for renomination in 1838.

He resumed the practice of law and served as attorney for county commissioners from 1846 to 1856. He moved to Media, Pennsylvania, in 1851 and served as district attorney of Delaware County from 1851 to 1854.

Darlington was a director of the Delaware County National Bank,

In 1842, Darlington was appointed director of the Delaware County Mutual Insurance Company.

He died in Media and was interred in Chester Rural Cemetery in Chester, Pennsylvania.

== Sources ==
- United States Congress. "Edward Darlington (id: D000056)". Biographical Directory of the United States Congress.
- The Political Graveyard

U.S. House of Representatives
Preceded by David Potts, Jr. Joshua Evans, Jr. William M. Hiester	Member of the U.S. House of Representatives from Pennsylvania's 4th congressional district 1833–1839 1833–1837 alongside: David Potts, Jr. and William M. Hiester; 1837–1839 alongside: David Potts, Jr. and Edward Davies	Succeeded by Edward Davies; Francis James; John Edwards
