= Field of blood =

Field of blood may refer to:

- Akeldama (from the Aramaic: "field of blood"), a place associated with Judas Iscariot in Jerusalem
- Battle of the Field of Blood, near Sarmada in Syria on June 28, 1119
- The Field of Blood (TV series), a 2011 BBC miniseries, based on the 2005 novel of the same name
- "Fields of Blood; Harvesters of Hate", a song by Sentenced from the 1993 album North from Here
- Fields of Blood, 2014 book by Karen Armstrong
- The Field of Blood: Violence in Congress and the Road to Civil War, 2018 book by Joanne B. Freeman
