= General Lea =

General Lea may refer to:

- Albert Miller Lea (1808–1891), Iowa Militia brigadier general
- George Lea (1912–1990), British Army lieutenant general
- Homer Lea (1876–1912), lieutenant general in the military forces of Chinese revolutionary Bao Huang Hui
