= Benjamin Brown French =

American politician

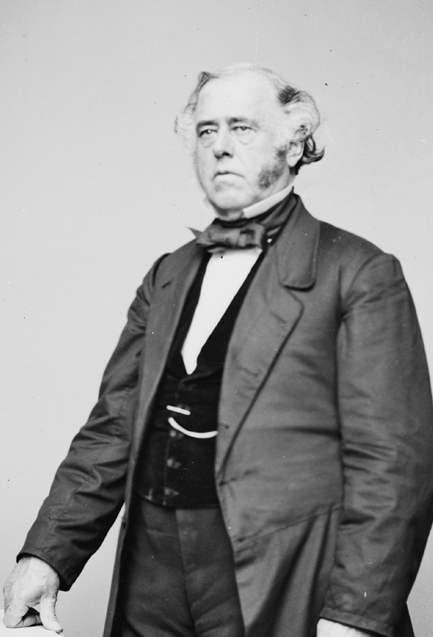

10th Clerk of the United States House of Representatives
- In office 1845–1847
- Speaker: John Davis
- Preceded by: Caleb J. McNulty
- Succeeded by: Thomas Jefferson Campbell

Personal details
- Born: September 4, 1800 Chester, New Hampshire, US
- Died: August 12, 1870 (aged 69) Washington, DC, US
- Party: Democrat, later a Republican

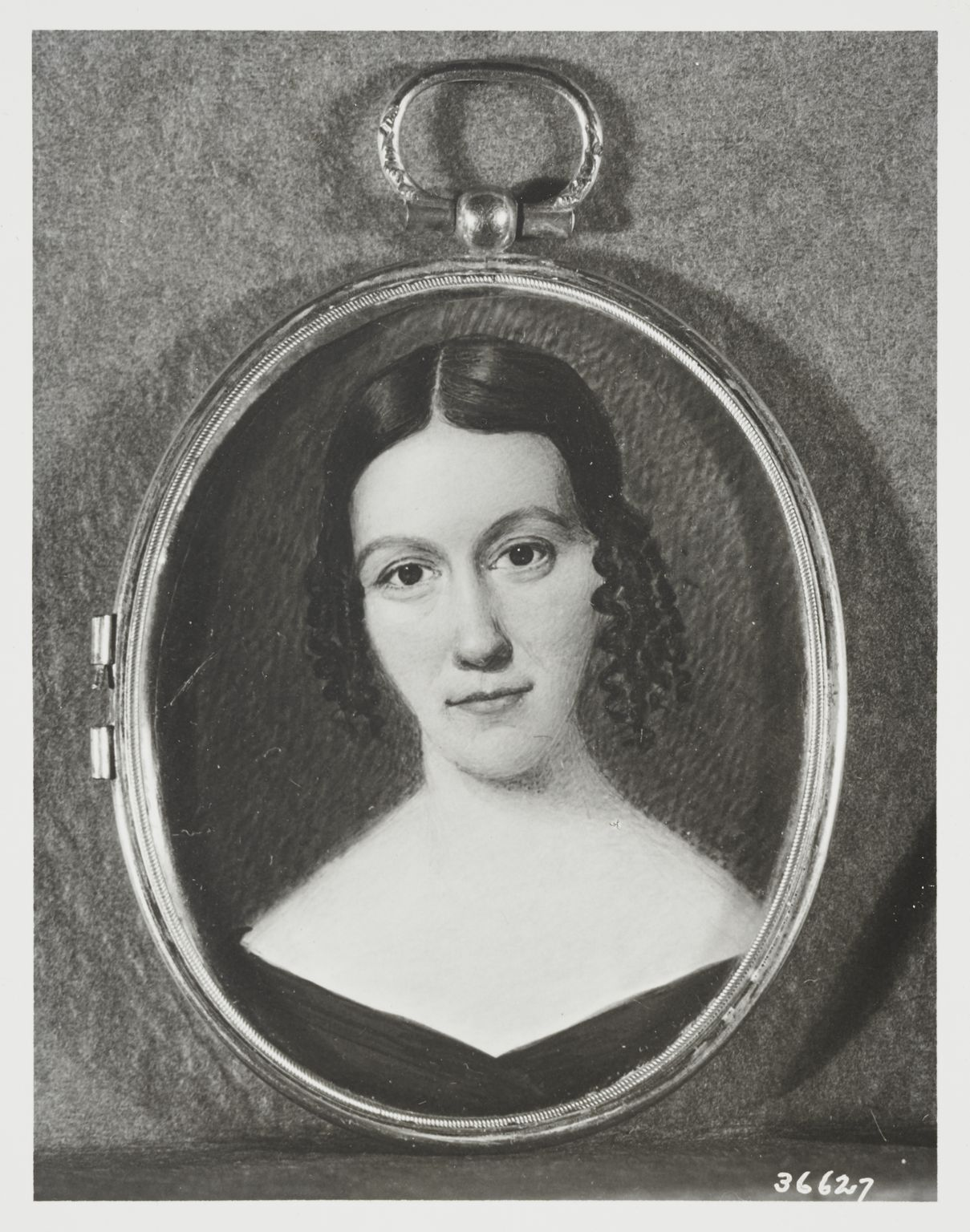
French's wife, Elizabeth Richardson French

Benjamin Brown French (1800–1870) was an American public official and telegraph business leader who served as 10th Clerk of the U.S. House of Representatives, and Public Commissioner of Buildings in Washington, D.C.

== Life ==
French was born in the farming town of Chester, New Hampshire, in 1800. His father Daniel French was a wealthy lawyer and farmer who served as the state's attorney general during the War of 1812. According to Joanne B. Freeman, education at this period in America was "patchy and erratic" so his "hodgepodge education was typical of many" as he "bounced" from private tutors, to a common school, to a local academies. French ran away to join the US Army, but was brought back and studied law, and at the age of twenty four eloped with Elizabeth Richardson, daughter of New Hampshire Supreme Court chief justice William Richardson.

The couple moved to Newport, New Hampshire where French was appointed Clerk of the Courts for Sullivan County, and two years later he became editor and part owner of the Jacksonian newspaper the New Hampshire Spectator. According to historian Joanne B. Freeman, Jacksonian politics "took hold with a vengeance in New Hampshire", and French, along with fellow newspaper editor and politician Isaac Hill, helped it become the "first organized national political party of its kind."

French was a member of the New Hampshire legislature representing Newport from 1831 until 1833, and it was here where he befriended the future President Franklin Pierce. In 1835 French saw the attempted assassination of Andrew Jackson.

In December of 1833 he moved to Washington, D.C., where he served as a clerk and in 1845 he became Clerk of the United States House of Representatives until 1847, and was appointed Commissioner of Public Buildings. He compiled an album of salt print and albumen print photographs related to construction of the Capitol dome and other sites. He was also involved in the burgeoning telegraph industry developed by Samuel Morse and others. After leaving the Clerkship, he worked in various roles and committee positions in and around Congress, sometimes filling in for the House Clerk as needed, and even was a lobbyist for a short time. French was at the Cilley-Graves duel in 1838 between Jonathan Cilley and William J. Graves, the only time a sitting congressman has killed another sitting congressman.

The August 30, 1845, issue of the Baltimore Sun led to the composition of a ballad by French about Luther Fuller who died aboard the steamboat Erie. It was printed on September 5.

French's views on slavery changed over time. When he first came to Washington, he believed that slave states had the right to keep slaves if they wished. However, he began to change after a conversation with abolitionist Joshua Reed Giddings in 1849, but still supported his friend Franklin Pierce in his pro-slavery election campaign in 1852. His waffling views on the topic of slavery was typical of many Northern Democrats, and at times he would have been considered a "doughface" a pejorative term for a Northerner in favor of slave states.

French was heavily involved in party politics, and in what Joanne B. Freeman called an "endless stream of civic responsibilities" including president of the City Council, alderman, trustee for the public schools, assistant secretary for the Smithsonian Board of Reagents, and public lecturer; and was involved in a number local charities including a school for free black girls.

French was very active in a number of clubs and societies, particularly Freemasonry. In the 1850s, he was Grand Master of the Knights Templar of the United States. He succeeded William S. Wood as Commissioner of Public Buildings in the fall of 1861.

He was present at Abraham Lincoln's inauguration (and was president of the inaugural ball committee), and is reported to have physically restrained John Wilkes Booth, who had gained access to the capitol rotunda, and was trying to push through the crowd. When Lincoln was assassinated in 1865, French was at his deathbed and comforted his wife Mary Todd Lincoln. French was also present for the Gettysburg Address, and oversaw Lincoln's funeral. He gave the main speech April 14, 1868, at the dedication of the Abraham Lincoln statue at Washington's City Hall.

He composed a hymn for the consecration of the National Cemetery at Gettysburg.

French is buried in Washington's Congressional Cemetery under a granite obelisk, a testament to his home state of New Hampshire.

== Family ==
His first son was born in 1837, and his second was born in 1845, the same year he became House Clerk.

Daniel Chester French, who would later sculpt the Statue of Abraham Lincoln at the Lincoln Memorial in Washington, D.C., was French's nephew; and French commented on Daniel's evident talent even early in his career. Amos Tuck French was his great-grandson.

== Journals ==
His journals were donated to the Library of Congress by an heir. His Capitol Hill home was torn down in 1895 in order for the library to be built. The journals were edited into a book and published posthumously as Witness to the Young Republic. Historian Joanne B. Freeman drew extensively upon these journals as a resource when writing her 2018 book, The Field of Blood: Violence in Congress and the Road to Civil War.

Government offices
Preceded by Caleb J. McNulty	Clerk of the United States House of Representatives; 1845–1847	Succeeded by Thomas J. Campbell
