= Alvan Cullom =

American politician (1797–1877)

Member of the U.S. House of Representatives from Tennessee's 4th district
- In office March 4, 1843 – March 3, 1847
- Preceded by: Thomas J. Campbell
- Succeeded by: Hugh Hill

Member of the Tennessee House of Representatives
- In office 1835–1836

Personal details
- Born: September 4, 1797 Monticello, Kentucky, U.S.
- Died: July 20, 1877 (aged 79) Livingston, Tennessee, U.S.
- Party: Democratic
- Spouse: Susan Jones Cullom
- Children: Elizabeth Cullom Keeton; William J. Cullom; James J. Cullom; Alvan J. Cullom; Sarah A. Cullom; Emila C. Cullom; Erasmus E. Cullom
- Profession: lawyer; judge; politician

Alvan Cullom (September 4, 1797 – July 20, 1877) was an American politician that represented Tennessee's 4th district in the United States House of Representatives.

== Biography ==
Cullom was born in Monticello, Kentucky, on September 4, 1797. He received a liberal schooling, studied law, was admitted to the bar in 1823, and commenced practice in Monroe, Overton County, Tennessee. He married Susan Jones and they had seven children.

== Career ==
Cullom was a member of the Tennessee House of Representatives in 1835 and 1836. He was elected as a Democrat to the 28th and 29th Congresses. He served from March 4, 1843, until March 3, 1847.

After resuming the practice of law, Cullom served as the circuit judge of the fourth judicial circuit of Tennessee from 1850 to 1852. He was a member of the peace convention in 1861 held in Washington, D.C., in an effort to prevent the impending war. He was the brother of William Cullom and uncle of Shelby Moore Cullom.

== Death ==
Cullom died in Livingston, Tennessee, on July 20, 1877 (age 79 years, 319 days). He is interred in Bethlehem Cemetery near Livingston.

U.S. House of Representatives
| Preceded by Thomas J. Campbell | Member of the U.S. House of Representatives from Tennessee's 4th congressional district 1843-1847 | Succeeded by Hugh Hill |
