= Tennessee's 4th congressional district =

U.S. House district for Tennessee

Coordinates: 35°15′44″N 86°37′44″W

- Interactive map of district boundaries
- Representative: Scott DesJarlais; R–Sherwood
- Distribution: 43.84% rural
- Population (2025): 841,906
- Median household income: $77,831
- Ethnicity: 75.9% White; 9.2% Black; 8.1% Hispanic; 4.3% Two or more races; 2.0% Asian; 0.7% other
- Cook PVI: R+11

The 4th congressional district of Tennessee is a congressional district in southern Tennessee. It has been represented by Republican Scott DesJarlais since January 2011.

Most of the district is rural, but many residents live in the suburbs of Chattanooga and Nashville. The most recent redistricting includes parts of Southeast Nashville, including some of Nashville's most densely populated neighborhoods. Much of the area is hilly, and has many well-known geographical features related to the location of portions of the district on the Cumberland Plateau.

This part of Tennessee has several well-recognized distilleries such as Duck River, George Dickel, Southern Pride, and most famously the Jack Daniel's Distillery in Lynchburg.

The region encompasses many of Tennessee's higher education facilities, such as Middle Tennessee State University, Sewanee: The University of the South, the Southeast campus of Nashville State, and Bryan College.

== Current boundaries ==
The district lies mostly in the southern part of Middle Tennessee, but stretches into East Tennessee. For the 118th and successive Congresses (based on redistricting following the 2020 census), it contains all or portions of the following counties and communities:

Bedford County (5)

All 5 communities

Bledsoe County (1)

Pikeville

Coffee County (5)

All 5 communities

Franklin County (10)

All 10 communities

Giles County (7)

All 7 communities

Grundy County (8)

All 8 communities

Lawrence County (8)

All 8 communities

Lincoln County (8)

All 8 communities

Marion County (11)

All 8 communities

Meigs County (1)

Decatur

Moore County (1)

Lynchburg

Rhea County (3)

All 3 communities

Rutherford County (7)

All 7 communities

Sequatchie County (2)

Dunlap, Lone Oak

Warren County (4)

All 4 communities

== Recent election results from statewide races ==
Year	Office	Results
2008	President	McCain 62% - 36%
2012	President	Romney 66% - 34%
2016	President	Trump 68% - 27%
2018	Senate	Blackburn 61% - 37%
2018	Governor	Lee 66% - 33%
2020	President	Trump 68% - 30%
2020	Senate	Hagerty 69% - 28%
2022	Governor	Lee 72% - 26%
2024	President	Trump 71% - 28%
2024	Senate	Blackburn 70% - 28%

== History ==
Throughout the 20th century, the 4th district took many different forms, but in most cases encompassed most of the rural area between Nashville and Knoxville. It has often been the state's largest district in terms of area, and one of the largest east of the Mississippi River, because of low population density and the district's rural character.

For almost thirty years (1947–1977), this area of Tennessee was represented in Congress by Joe L. Evins. (Early in his political career, his district was numbered as the "5th", but that district was almost entirely in what became the 4th after the round of redistricting following the 1950 census.) Evins' successor in Congress was future vice president Al Gore Jr., who represented the 4th from 1977 to 1983. The district's current configuration dates from the 1980 census, when Tennessee gained a new congressional seat. Parts of what were previously in the 1st, 2nd, 3rd, 4th, and 6th districts were combined to form a new 4th district. Most of Gore's territory became the 6th district.

The new district incorporated pieces of heavily Republican East Tennessee and traditionally Democratic Middle Tennessee. It was so large that it stretched across five of Tennessee's eight television markets (Nashville, Knoxville, Chattanooga, the Tri-Cities, as well as the Tennessee share of the Huntsville, Alabama, market). and five of the state's nine radio markets (the above-mentioned cities, plus Cookeville). This gave congressional races much of the feel of statewide races; candidates' advertising budgets sometimes rivaled those for governor and U.S. Senate. Open-seat races in this district were usually among the most-watched in the country. However, the district's large size and lack of unifying influences make it very difficult to unseat an incumbent. Consequently, the district's congressman was usually reckoned as a statewide figure, with a good chance for winning state office in the future.

In 1982, Democrat Jim Cooper, son of former governor Prentice Cooper, defeated Cissy Baker, daughter of Senate Majority Leader Howard Baker. Cooper went on to represent the district until 1995. On paper, this district was not safe for either party, given its volatile demographics. Much of the eastern portion, for instance, had not been represented by a Democrat since before the Civil War. However, Cooper was reelected five times without serious difficulty.

Cooper gave up his seat to run for the U.S. Senate in 1994, but lost to Fred Thompson. Republican Van Hilleary won the seat as part of the massive Republican wave of that year. Hilleary was reelected three times without much difficulty, handily winning a second term even as Bill Clinton carried the district due to Gore's presence as his running mate; Gore represented much of the western portion of the district for his first three terms in the House.

In 2002, Hilleary retired to mount an ultimately unsuccessful bid to become Governor of Tennessee, and was replaced by Democratic state senator Lincoln Davis. Davis held the seat for eight years. In 2010, Davis was challenged by Republican doctor Scott DesJarlais from South Pittsburg, who rode to victory on the Tea Party wave of 2010 despite Davis raising more money. This marked the first time that an incumbent had been defeated in the district since the reformation of the district in 1982. Indeed, DesJarlais became the first challenger to defeat an incumbent Tennessee congressman in a general election since 1974. Following the 2010 census, the 4th was made slightly more compact. The district lost its northern portion, including its territory near the Tri-Cities and Knoxville. On the other hand, it gained all of Rutherford County, home of Murfreesboro, and northern Bradley County.

== List of members representing the district ==
Name	Party	Years	Cong ress	Electoral history	District location
District established March 4, 1813
John H. Bowen (Gallatin)	Democratic-Republican	March 4, 1813 – March 3, 1815	13th	Elected in 1813. Retired.	1813–1823 [data missing]
Bennett H. Henderson (Hendersonville)	Democratic-Republican	March 4, 1815 – March 3, 1817	14th	Elected in 1815. Retired.	1813–1823 [data missing]
Samuel E. Hogg (Lebanon)	Democratic-Republican	March 4, 1817 – March 3, 1819	15th	Elected in 1817. Retired.	1813–1823 [data missing]
Robert Allen (Carthage)	Democratic-Republican	March 4, 1819 – March 3, 1823	16th 17th	Elected in 1819. Re-elected in 1821. Redistricted to the 5th district.	1813–1823 [data missing]
Jacob C. Isacks (Winchester)	Democratic-Republican (Jackson)	March 4, 1823 – March 3, 1825	18th 19th 20th 21st 22nd	Elected in 1823. Re-elected in 1825. Re-elected in 1827. Re-elected in 1829. Re-elected in 1831. Redistricted to the 5th district and lost re-election.	1823–1833 [data missing]
Jacob C. Isacks (Winchester)	Jacksonian	March 4, 1825 – March 3, 1833	18th 19th 20th 21st 22nd	Elected in 1823. Re-elected in 1825. Re-elected in 1827. Re-elected in 1829. Re-elected in 1831. Redistricted to the 5th district and lost re-election.	1823–1833 [data missing]
James I. Standifer (Mount Airy)	Jacksonian	March 4, 1833 – March 3, 1835	23rd 24th 25th	Redistricted from the 3rd district and re-elected in 1833. Re-elected in 1835. Re-elected in 1837. Died.	1833–1843 [data missing]
James I. Standifer (Mount Airy)	Anti-Jacksonian	March 4, 1835 – March 3, 1837	23rd 24th 25th	Redistricted from the 3rd district and re-elected in 1833. Re-elected in 1835. Re-elected in 1837. Died.	1833–1843 [data missing]
James I. Standifer (Mount Airy)	Whig	March 4, 1837 – August 20, 1837	23rd 24th 25th	Redistricted from the 3rd district and re-elected in 1833. Re-elected in 1835. Re-elected in 1837. Died.	1833–1843 [data missing]
Vacant		August 20, 1837 – September 14, 1837	25th		1833–1843 [data missing]
William Stone (Delphi)	Whig	September 14, 1837 – March 3, 1839	25th	Elected September 14, 1837, to finish Standifer's term and seated October 6, 1837. Lost re-election.	1833–1843 [data missing]
Julius W. Blackwell (Athens)	Democratic	March 4, 1839 – March 3, 1841	26th	Elected in 1839. Lost re-election.	1833–1843 [data missing]
Thomas J. Campbell (Athens)	Whig	March 4, 1841 – March 3, 1843	27th	Elected in 1841. Redistricted to the 3rd district and lost re-election.	1833–1843 [data missing]
Alvan Cullom (Livingston)	Democratic	March 4, 1843 – March 3, 1847	28th 29th	Elected in 1843. Re-elected in 1845. Retired.	1843–1853 [data missing]
Hugh Hill (Irving College)	Democratic	March 4, 1847 – March 3, 1849	30th	Elected in 1847. Retired.	1843–1853 [data missing]
John H. Savage (Smithville)	Democratic	March 4, 1849 – March 3, 1853	31st 32nd	Elected in 1849. Re-elected in 1851. Retired.	1843–1853 [data missing]
William Cullom (Carthage)	Whig	March 4, 1853 – March 3, 1855	33rd	Redistricted from the 8th district and re-elected in 1853. Lost re-election.	1853–1863 [data missing]
John H. Savage (Smithville)	Democratic	March 4, 1855 – March 3, 1859	34th 35th	Elected in 1855. Re-elected in 1857. Lost re-election.	1853–1863 [data missing]
William B. Stokes (Alexandria)	Opposition	March 4, 1859 – March 3, 1861	36th	Elected in 1859. Redistricted to the 3rd district.	1853–1863 [data missing]
Andrew J. Clements (Lafayette)	Union	March 4, 1861 – March 3, 1863	37th	Elected in 1861. Could not seek re-election, as state was under Confederate occupation.	1853–1863 [data missing]
District inactive		March 3, 1863 – July 24, 1866	38th 39th	Civil War and Reconstruction	
Edmund Cooper (Shelbyville)	Union	July 24, 1866 – March 3, 1867	39th	Elected in 1865. Lost re-election.	1866–1873 [data missing]
James Mullins (Shelbyville)	Republican	March 4, 1867 – March 3, 1869	40th	Elected in 1867. Retired.	1866–1873 [data missing]
Lewis Tillman (Shelbyville)	Republican	March 4, 1869 – March 3, 1871	41st	Elected in 1868. Retired.	1866–1873 [data missing]
John M. Bright (Fayetteville)	Democratic	March 4, 1871 – March 3, 1875	42nd 43rd	Elected in 1870. Re-elected in 1872. Redistricted to the 5th district.	1866–1873 [data missing]
John M. Bright (Fayetteville)	Democratic	March 4, 1871 – March 3, 1875	42nd 43rd	Elected in 1870. Re-elected in 1872. Redistricted to the 5th district.	1873–1883 [data missing]
Samuel M. Fite (Carthage)	Democratic	March 4, 1875 – October 23, 1875	44th	Elected to begin representative-elect John W. Head's term. Died.	1873–1883 [data missing]
Vacant		October 23, 1875 – December 14, 1875	44th		1873–1883 [data missing]
Haywood Y. Riddle (Lebanon)	Democratic	December 14, 1875 – March 3, 1879	44th 45th	Elected to finish Fite's term. Re-elected in 1876. Retired.	1873–1883 [data missing]
Benton McMillin (Carthage)	Democratic	March 4, 1879 – January 6, 1899	46th 47th 48th 49th 50th 51st 52nd 53rd 54th 55th	Elected in 1878. Re-elected in 1880. Re-elected in 1882. Re-elected in 1884. Re-elected in 1886. Re-elected in 1888. Re-elected in 1890. Re-elected in 1892. Re-elected in 1894. Re-elected in 1896. Retired to run for Governor of Tennessee and resigned when elected.	1873–1883 [data missing]
Benton McMillin (Carthage)	Democratic	March 4, 1879 – January 6, 1899	46th 47th 48th 49th 50th 51st 52nd 53rd 54th 55th	Elected in 1878. Re-elected in 1880. Re-elected in 1882. Re-elected in 1884. Re-elected in 1886. Re-elected in 1888. Re-elected in 1890. Re-elected in 1892. Re-elected in 1894. Re-elected in 1896. Retired to run for Governor of Tennessee and resigned when elected.	1883–1893 [data missing]
Benton McMillin (Carthage)	Democratic	March 4, 1879 – January 6, 1899	46th 47th 48th 49th 50th 51st 52nd 53rd 54th 55th	Elected in 1878. Re-elected in 1880. Re-elected in 1882. Re-elected in 1884. Re-elected in 1886. Re-elected in 1888. Re-elected in 1890. Re-elected in 1892. Re-elected in 1894. Re-elected in 1896. Retired to run for Governor of Tennessee and resigned when elected.	1893–1903 [data missing]
Vacant		January 6, 1899 – March 3, 1899	55th		1893–1903 [data missing]
Charles E. Snodgrass (Crossville)	Democratic	March 4, 1899 – March 3, 1903	56th 57th	Elected in 1898. Re-elected in 1900. Lost renomination.	1893–1903 [data missing]
Morgan C. Fitzpatrick (Hartsville)	Democratic	March 4, 1903 – March 3, 1905	58th	Elected in 1902. Retired.	1903–1913 [data missing]
Mounce G. Butler (Gainesboro)	Democratic	March 4, 1905 – March 3, 1907	59th	Elected in 1904. Lost renomination.	1903–1913 [data missing]
Cordell Hull (Carthage)	Democratic	March 4, 1907 – March 3, 1921	60th 61st 62nd 63rd 64th 65th 66th	Elected in 1906. Re-elected in 1908. Re-elected in 1910. Re-elected in 1912. Re-elected in 1914. Re-elected in 1916. Re-elected in 1918. Lost re-election.	1903–1913 [data missing]
Cordell Hull (Carthage)	Democratic	March 4, 1907 – March 3, 1921	60th 61st 62nd 63rd 64th 65th 66th	Elected in 1906. Re-elected in 1908. Re-elected in 1910. Re-elected in 1912. Re-elected in 1914. Re-elected in 1916. Re-elected in 1918. Lost re-election.	1913–1933 [data missing]
Wynne F. Clouse (Cookeville)	Republican	March 4, 1921 – March 3, 1923	67th	Elected in 1920. Lost re-election.	1913–1933 [data missing]
Cordell Hull (Carthage)	Democratic	March 4, 1923 – March 3, 1931	68th 69th 70th 71st	Elected in 1922. Re-elected in 1924. Re-elected in 1926. Re-elected in 1928. Retired to run for U.S. senator.	1913–1933 [data missing]
John R. Mitchell (Cookeville)	Democratic	March 4, 1931 – January 3, 1939	72nd 73rd 74th 75th	Elected in 1930. Re-elected in 1932. Re-elected in 1934. Re-elected in 1936. Retired to run for U.S. senator.	1913–1933 [data missing]
John R. Mitchell (Cookeville)	Democratic	March 4, 1931 – January 3, 1939	72nd 73rd 74th 75th	Elected in 1930. Re-elected in 1932. Re-elected in 1934. Re-elected in 1936. Retired to run for U.S. senator.	1933–1943 [data missing]
Albert Gore Sr. (Carthage)	Democratic	January 3, 1939 – December 4, 1944	76th 77th 78th	Elected in 1938. Re-elected in 1940. Re-elected in 1942. Re-elected in 1944 but resigned until next term began to enter U.S. Army for fact-finding training.	1933–1943 [data missing]
Albert Gore Sr. (Carthage)	Democratic	January 3, 1939 – December 4, 1944	76th 77th 78th	Elected in 1938. Re-elected in 1940. Re-elected in 1942. Re-elected in 1944 but resigned until next term began to enter U.S. Army for fact-finding training.	1943–1953 [data missing]
Vacant		December 4, 1944 – January 3, 1945	78th		1943–1953 [data missing]
Albert Gore Sr. (Carthage)	Democratic	January 3, 1945 – January 3, 1953	79th 80th 81st 82nd	Re-elected in 1946. Re-elected in 1948. Re-elected in 1950. Retired to run for U.S. senator.	1943–1953 [data missing]
Joe L. Evins (Smithville)	Democratic	January 3, 1953 – January 3, 1977	83rd 84th 85th 86th 87th 88th 89th 90th 91st 92nd 93rd 94th	Redistricted from the 5th district and re-elected in 1952. Re-elected in 1954. Re-elected in 1956. Re-elected in 1958. Re-elected in 1960. Re-elected in 1962. Re-elected in 1964. Re-elected in 1966. Re-elected in 1968. Re-elected in 1970. Re-elected in 1972. Re-elected in 1974. Retired.	1953–1963 [data missing]
Joe L. Evins (Smithville)	Democratic	January 3, 1953 – January 3, 1977	83rd 84th 85th 86th 87th 88th 89th 90th 91st 92nd 93rd 94th	Redistricted from the 5th district and re-elected in 1952. Re-elected in 1954. Re-elected in 1956. Re-elected in 1958. Re-elected in 1960. Re-elected in 1962. Re-elected in 1964. Re-elected in 1966. Re-elected in 1968. Re-elected in 1970. Re-elected in 1972. Re-elected in 1974. Retired.	1963–1973 [data missing]
Joe L. Evins (Smithville)	Democratic	January 3, 1953 – January 3, 1977	83rd 84th 85th 86th 87th 88th 89th 90th 91st 92nd 93rd 94th	Redistricted from the 5th district and re-elected in 1952. Re-elected in 1954. Re-elected in 1956. Re-elected in 1958. Re-elected in 1960. Re-elected in 1962. Re-elected in 1964. Re-elected in 1966. Re-elected in 1968. Re-elected in 1970. Re-elected in 1972. Re-elected in 1974. Retired.	1973–1983 [data missing]
Al Gore (Carthage)	Democratic	January 3, 1977 – January 3, 1983	95th 96th 97th	Elected in 1976. Re-elected in 1978. Re-elected in 1980. Redistricted to the 6th district.	1973–1983 [data missing]
Jim Cooper (Shelbyville)	Democratic	January 3, 1983 – January 3, 1995	98th 99th 100th 101st 102nd 103rd	Elected in 1982. Re-elected in 1984. Re-elected in 1986. Re-elected in 1988. Re-elected in 1990. Re-elected in 1992. Retired to run for U.S. senator.	1983–1993 [data missing]
Jim Cooper (Shelbyville)	Democratic	January 3, 1983 – January 3, 1995	98th 99th 100th 101st 102nd 103rd	Elected in 1982. Re-elected in 1984. Re-elected in 1986. Re-elected in 1988. Re-elected in 1990. Re-elected in 1992. Retired to run for U.S. senator.	1993–2003 [data missing]
Van Hilleary (Spring City)	Republican	January 3, 1995 – January 3, 2003	104th 105th 106th 107th	Elected in 1994. Re-elected in 1996. Re-elected in 1998. Re-elected in 2000. Retired to run for Governor of Tennessee.	1993–2003 [data missing]
Lincoln Davis (Pall Mall)	Democratic	January 3, 2003 – January 3, 2011	108th 109th 110th 111th	Elected in 2002. Re-elected in 2004. Re-elected in 2006. Re-elected in 2008. Lost re-election.	2003–2013
Scott DesJarlais (Sherwood)	Republican	January 3, 2011 – present	112th 113th 114th 115th 116th 117th 118th 119th	Elected in 2010. Re-elected in 2012. Re-elected in 2014. Re-elected in 2016. Re-elected in 2018. Re-elected in 2020. Re-elected in 2022. Re-elected in 2024. Lost re-election.	2003–2013
Scott DesJarlais (Sherwood)	Republican	January 3, 2011 – present	112th 113th 114th 115th 116th 117th 118th 119th	Elected in 2010. Re-elected in 2012. Re-elected in 2014. Re-elected in 2016. Re-elected in 2018. Re-elected in 2020. Re-elected in 2022. Re-elected in 2024. Lost re-election.	2013–2023
Scott DesJarlais (Sherwood)	Republican	January 3, 2011 – present	112th 113th 114th 115th 116th 117th 118th 119th	Elected in 2010. Re-elected in 2012. Re-elected in 2014. Re-elected in 2016. Re-elected in 2018. Re-elected in 2020. Re-elected in 2022. Re-elected in 2024. Lost re-election.	2023–2027
Victoria Broderick	Democratic	January 3, 2027 –		Elected in 2026.	2027–present

== See also ==
- Tennessee's congressional districts
- List of United States congressional districts

== Sources ==
- Martis, Kenneth C. (1989). The Historical Atlas of Political Parties in the United States Congress. New York: Macmillan Publishing Company.
- Martis, Kenneth C. (1982). The Historical Atlas of United States Congressional Districts. New York: Macmillan Publishing Company.
- Congressional Biographical Directory of the United States 1774–present
- Political Graveyard database of Tennessee congressmen
