= James Coffield Mitchell =

American politician (1786–1843)

Member of the U.S. House of Representatives from Tennessee's 3rd district
- In office March 4, 1825 – March 3, 1829
- Preceded by: James I. Standifer
- Succeeded by: James I. Standifer

Personal details
- Born: March 10, 1786 Staunton, Virginia
- Died: August 7, 1843 (aged 57) Hinds County, Mississippi, U.S.
- Profession: lawyer; politician

James Coffield Mitchell (March 10, 1786 – August 7, 1843) was an American politician who represented Tennessee in the United States House of Representatives.

== Biography ==
Mitchell was born in Staunton, Virginia in March 1786 and attended the common schools. He studied law, was admitted to the bar, and practiced law. He moved to Tennessee and settled in Rhea County. From 1813 to 1817, he was the Solicitor General for the second district of Tennessee. He moved to Athens, Tennessee, in 1817.

== Career ==
Mitchell was elected as a Jacksonian to the Nineteenth and Twentieth Congresses. He served from March 4, 1825, to March 4, 1829. During the Twentieth Congress, he was chairman of the U.S. House Committee on Military Pensions. He was an unsuccessful candidate for re-election. He was judge of the eleventh circuit from 1830 to 1836.

Mitchell then moved to Hinds County, Mississippi, and settled near Jackson around 1837. He was an unsuccessful candidate on the Whig ticket for Governor of Mississippi and for the Mississippi House of Representatives. He engaged in agricultural pursuits as well. He owned slaves.

== Death ==
Mitchell died near Jackson, Mississippi on August 7, 1843, aged 57. The location of his interment is unknown. He was the author of Mitchell's Justice.

U.S. House of Representatives
Preceded by James I. Standifer	Member of the U.S. House of Representatives from Tennessee's 3rd congressional district 1825–1829	Succeeded by James I. Standifer
