= Edward Lea =

United States Navy officer

- Born: January 31, 1837; Baltimore, Maryland
- Died: January 1, 1863 (aged 25); Galveston, Texas
- Burial place: Trinity Episcopal Cemetery, Galveston, Texas
- Relatives: Albert Miller Lea (father); Pryor Lea (uncle)
- Military career
- Allegiance: United States of America
- Branch: United States Navy
- Service years: 1851–1863
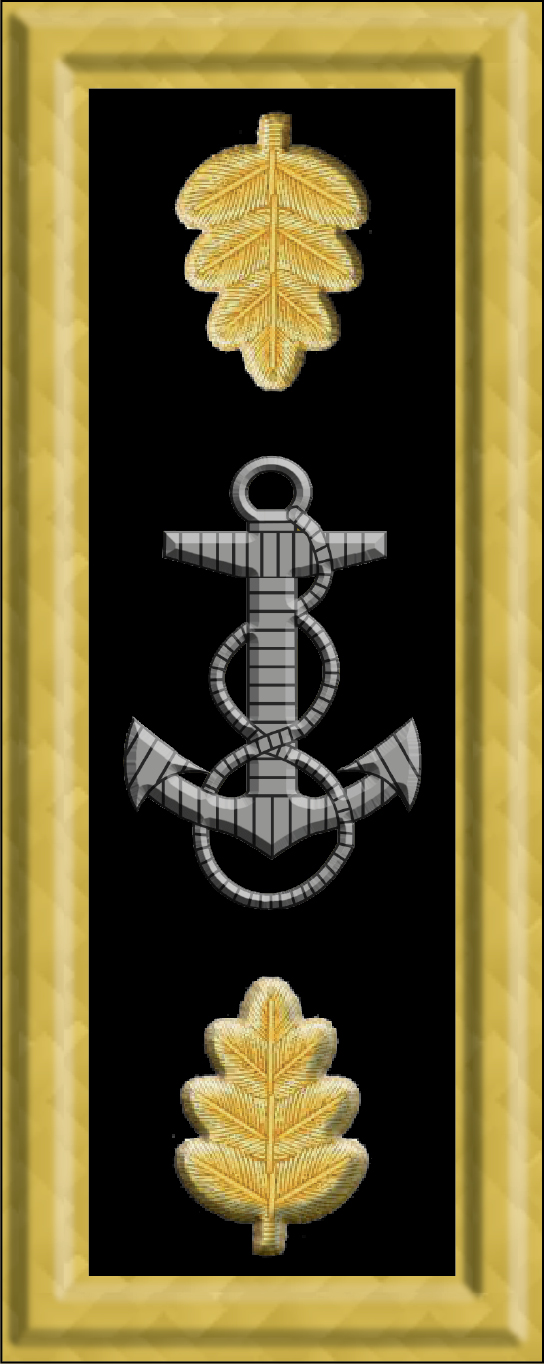
- Rank: Lieutenant commander
- Conflicts: American Civil War • Capture of New Orleans • Battle of Galveston Harbor • Battle of Galveston †

Edward Lea (January 31, 1837 – January 1, 1863) was an officer in the United States Navy during the American Civil War. He was mortally wounded at the Battle of Galveston and died in the arms of his father, who was on the opposing side in the conflict.

== Biography ==
Lea was born in Baltimore, Maryland, the son of Army engineer Albert Miller Lea and Ellen Shoemaker. He entered the Naval Academy at Annapolis on October 2, 1851, graduating on June 9, 1855, with the rank of midshipman. Lea was employed in active service on various stations, receiving promotion to passed midshipman on April 15, 1858, to master on November 4, 1858, and to lieutenant on November 22, 1860.

Lea was serving aboard the Hartford, flagship of the East India Squadron, when the Civil War broke out in 1861. The ship was recalled, eventually arriving in Delaware Bay in December. Lea was soon reassigned to the Harriet Lane, then attached to the Potomac Flotilla, but was soon reassigned in her to the Gulf Blockading Squadron, where he took part in operations leading to the capture of New Orleans in April 1862. Lea was subsequently promoted to lieutenant commander on July 16, 1862. Harriet Lane pushed further up the Mississippi that July to engage enemy batteries around Vicksburg, and was then assigned to the blockade of Galveston, which she helped capture in October 1862 in the Battle of Galveston Harbor.

When Confederate forces retook Galveston on 1 January 1863, Lea, serving as the first officer (XO) of Harriet Lane, was wounded in the abdomen and side. He subsequently succumbed to his wounds in the arms of his father, who was serving as a major of artillery in the Confederate Army, and who had witnessed the capture of the Harriet Lane by the gunboat CS Bayou City from shore, and had rushed to the ship to find his son dying.

Lea and his captain, Jonathan M. Wainwright were buried together at the Trinity Episcopal Cemetery in Galveston. After the war Wainwright was re-interred at the Naval Academy Cemetery in Annapolis, but when a relative suggested that Lea's remains be reburied next to his mother in the Green Mount Cemetery, Baltimore, Albert Lea refused, stating that his son would have preferred to remain where he had fallen in battle.

== Namesake ==
The destroyer USS Lea (DD-118) was named for him, as is Camp #2 of the Sons of Union Veterans of the Civil War in Houston.
