= Thomas K. Harris =

American politician

Member of the U.S. House of Representatives from Tennessee's 3rd district
- In office March 4, 1813 – March 3, 1815
- Preceded by: Felix Grundy
- Succeeded by: Isaac Thomas

Personal details
- Born: c. 1777
- Died: March 18, 1816 (aged 38–39)
- Party: Democratic-Republican
- Profession: lawyer; soldier; politician

Thomas K. Harris (c. 1777 – March 18, 1816) was an American politician who represented Tennessee in the United States House of Representatives.

== Biography ==
After he had studied law, he was admitted to the bar. He practiced law in both Sparta and McMinnville, Tennessee. He was a soldier under General Andrew Jackson in the War of 1812.

== Career ==
Harris served as a trustee of Priestly Academy in Sparta, Tennessee. It was the first school of any importance in White County of which a record can be found. The school was taught by the Reverend Memucan Wade, a Presbyterian minister. It was established about 1815 in Sparta.

Harris was a member of the Tennessee Senate during the 8th General A from 1809 until 1811. Having been elected as a Democratic-Republican to the Thirteenth Congress, he was a United States representative during the Thirteenth Congress which lasted from March 4, 1813, to March 3, 1815.

General John Simpson and General Harris were candidates for brigadier general. When General Harris was successful and commissioned on January 8, 1815, General Simpson then claimed that he had been defeated because General Harris had withdrawn from the race, and had it not been for this report, Simpson would have been chosen. Bitter feelings arose between the two, and when they met on the Public Square in Sparta, General Simpson struck General Harris with a heavy cane. At the time the generals were separated, Harris swore he would kill Simpson.

== Death ==
On March 18, 1816, Harris and Simpson met for the first time at Shell's Ford of Collins River, near McMinnville. Both were prepared for the meeting. Simpson wanted a witness to what might follow; turned his horse; halted at a man's house and dismounted. Harris followed; fired at him and missed. Simpson then fired, inflicting a mortal wound in the breast of Harris. Simpson helped to carry Harris into the house. Harris was about 39 years of age. The location of his interment is unknown. General Simpson was commissioned as brigadier general of the Second Division of the State Militia on September 26, 1828. The pistol with which Simpson killed Harris was, in 1902, a possession of Dr. Charles Simpson, his grandson, of Waxahachie, Texas.

U.S. House of Representatives
Preceded by Felix Grundy	Member of the U.S. House of Representatives from Tennessee's 3rd congressional district 1813-1815	Succeeded by Isaac Thomas
