= Thomas Jefferson Campbell =

American politician (1793–1850)

Clerk of the United States House of Representatives
- In office 1847–1850
- Speaker: Robert C. Winthrop
- Preceded by: Benjamin B. French
- Succeeded by: Richard M. Young

Member of the U.S. House of Representatives from Tennessee's 4th district
- In office March 4, 1841 – March 3, 1843
- Preceded by: Julius W. Blackwell
- Succeeded by: Alvan Cullom

Member of the Tennessee House of Representatives
- In office 1817–1819; 1821; 1825–1831

Personal details
- Born: February 22, 1793 Rhea County, Tennessee
- Died: April 13, 1850 (aged 57) Washington, D.C., U.S.
- Party: Whig

Thomas Jefferson Campbell (February 22, 1793 – April 13, 1850) was an American politician who represented Tennessee's 4th congressional district in the United States House of Representatives from 1841 until 1843. He served as Clerk of the United States House of Representatives from 1847 until 1850.

== Biography ==
Thomas Jefferson Campbell was born in Rhea County, Tennessee in 1793, and he attended the public schools.

== Career ==
Assistant inspector general to Major General Cole's division of the East Tennessee Militia, Campbell served from September 14, 1813, to March 12, 1814. He was clerk of the Tennessee House of Representatives from 1817 to 1819, in 1821, and from 1825 to 1831. He was a Representative from 1833 to 1837.

Elected as a Whig to the Twenty-seventh Congress, Campbell served from March 4, 1841, to March 3, 1843. He was an unsuccessful candidate in 1842 for re-election to the Twenty-eighth Congress. He was Clerk of the United States House of Representatives in the Thirtieth and Thirty-first Congresses.

== Death ==
Campbell served from December 7, 1847, until his death in Washington, D.C., on April 13, 1850. He is interred at Calhoun, Tennessee.

U.S. House of Representatives
Preceded by Julius W. Blackwell	Member of the U.S. House of Representatives from Tennessee's 4th congressional district 1841-1843	Succeeded by Alvan Cullom
Government offices
Preceded by Benjamin B. French	Clerk of the United States House of Representatives; 1847–1850	Succeeded by Richard M. Young
