= Josiah M. Anderson =

American politician

Josiah McNair Anderson
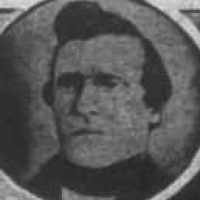

Member of the U.S. House of Representatives from Tennessee's 3rd district
- In office March 4, 1849 – March 3, 1851
- Preceded by: John H. Crozier
- Succeeded by: William M. Churchwell

Member of the Tennessee Senate
- In office 1843–1845

Member of the Tennessee House of Representatives
- In office 1833–1837

Personal details
- Born: November 29, 1807 Bledsoe County, Tennessee, U.S.
- Died: November 8, 1861 (aged 53) Whitwell, Tennessee, C.S.
- Party: Whig
- Profession: lawyer; politician

Josiah McNair Anderson (November 29, 1807 – November 8, 1861) was an American slave owner, politician and a member of the United States House of Representatives for Tennessee's 3rd congressional district.

== Biography ==
Anderson was born near Pikeville, Tennessee in Bledsoe County on November 29, 1807. He attended the common schools, studied law, was admitted to the bar, and commenced practice in Jasper, Tennessee.

== Career ==
From 1833 to 1837, Anderson was a member of the Tennessee House of Representatives, serving as speaker. He was a member of the Tennessee Senate from 1843 to 1845, serving as its presiding officer.

Elected as a Whig to the Thirty-first United States Congress, Anderson served from March 4, 1849 to March 3, 1851. He was not a successful candidate for re-election in 1850 to the Thirty-second Congress.

Anderson was a delegate from Tennessee to the peace convention of 1861, held in Washington, D.C., in an effort to devise means to prevent the impending war. He was a colonel in the Tennessee State Militia in 1861.

== Death ==
Anderson was killed at Looneys Creek, near the present town of Whitwell, Tennessee in Marion County on November 8, 1861 (age 53 years, 344 days), just after having made a secession speech. He is interred at the Anderson Family Cemetery, seven miles southeast of Dunlap, Tennessee in Sequatchie County.

An article in the North Carolina Standard newspaper, dated Wednesday, Nov. 27, 1861, states:

Murder of Hon. Josiah M. Anderson of Tennessee - On the day of the election, at or near Dunlap, Sequatchie County, Tennessee, Hon. Josiah M. Anderson was set upon by a band of Lincolnite assassins, and stabbed in the back, causing his instant death. Col. Anderson formerly represented the Knoxville District in the Congress of the United States, and was a delegate from Tennessee in the "Peace Congress." His only offense for which he was so basely assassinated, was his defense of the South in conversation.

U.S. House of Representatives
Preceded by John H. Crozier	Member of the U.S. House of Representatives from Tennessee's 3rd congressional district 1849–1851	Succeeded by William M. Churchwell
