= USS Lea =

Wickes-class destroyer

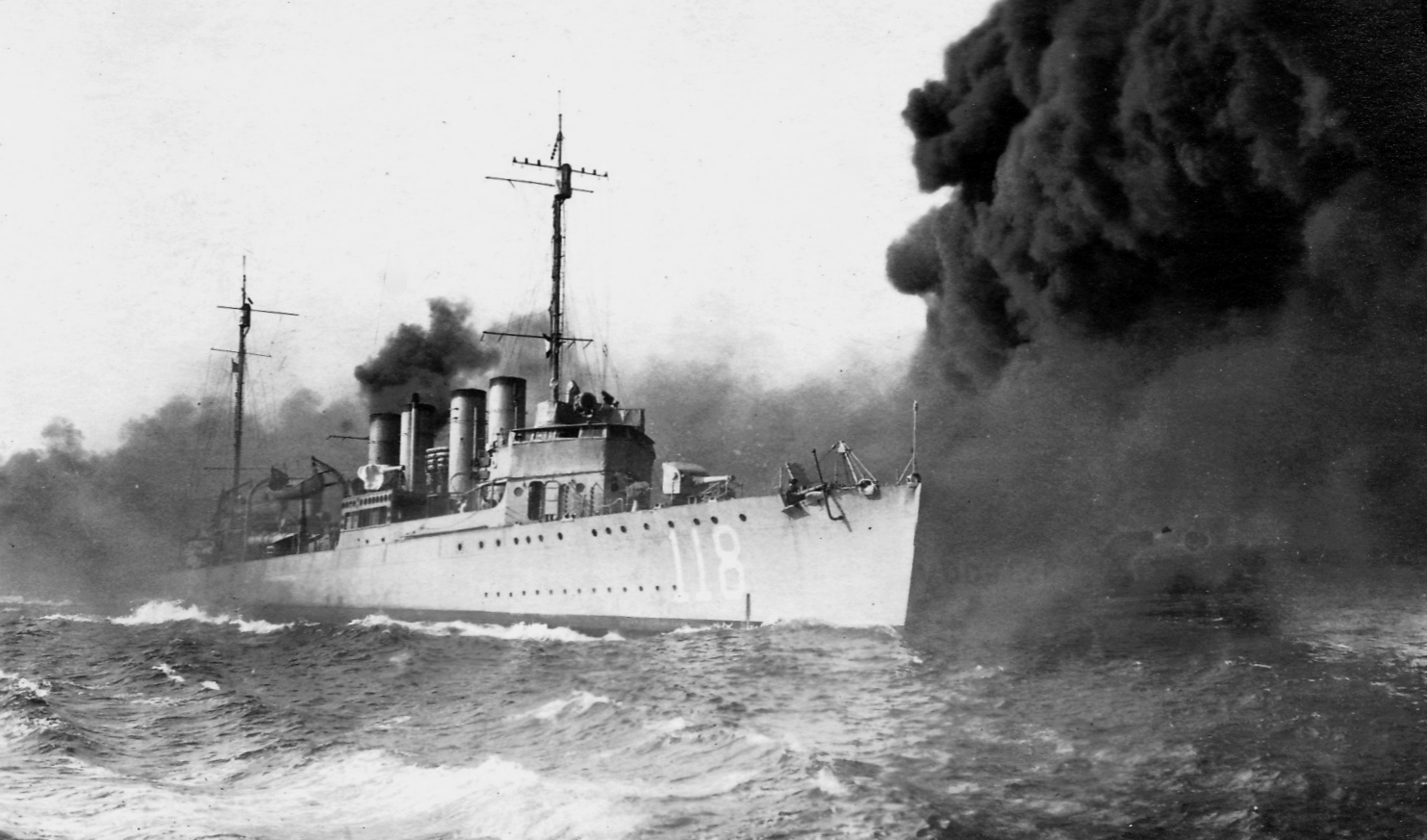
- USS Lea (DD-118) laying a smoke screen in 1921

History

United States
- Name: Lea
- Namesake: Edward Lea
- Builder: William Cramp & Sons, Philadelphia
- Yard number: 455
- Laid down: 18 September 1917
- Launched: 29 April 1918
- Commissioned: 2 October 1918
- Decommissioned: 22 June 1922
- Recommissioned: 1 May 1930
- Decommissioned: 7 April 1937
- Recommissioned: 30 September 1939
- Decommissioned: 20 July 1945
- Stricken: 13 August 1945
- Fate: Sold for scrapping, 30 November 1946

General characteristics
- Class & type: Wickes-class destroyer
- Displacement: 1,165 tons
- Length: 314 ft 4 in (95.8 m)
- Beam: 30 ft 11 in (9.4 m)
- Draft: 9 ft 0 in (2.7 m)
- Speed: 35 knots (65 km/h)
- Complement: 133 officers and enlisted
- Armament: 4 × 4 in (102 mm)/50 guns; 2 × 3 in (76 mm)/23 guns; 12 × 21 in (533 mm) torpedo tubes

USS Lea (DD-118) was a Wickes-class destroyer in the United States Navy during World War I and World War II. She was named in honor of Edward Lea, a US Navy officer killed during the American Civil War.

Lea was laid down on 18 September 1917 by William Cramp & Sons, Philadelphia. The ship was launched on 29 April 1918, sponsored by Mrs. Harry E. Collins. The destroyer was commissioned on 2 October 1918, Lieutenant Commander David W. Bagley in command.

== Service history ==
After service in the Atlantic with DesRon 19 during 1919, Lea transferred to the Pacific Fleet in 1920 and served primarily along the West Coast during the years between the wars. She was out of commission at San Diego from 22 June 1922 to 1 May 1930 and 7 April 1937 to 30 September 1939. She sailed for the East Coast to join the Neutrality Patrol, guarding the western Atlantic through the tense months before the US entry into World War II. She served in the force guarding transports carrying marines for the occupation of Iceland on 8 July 1941.

=== World War II ===
For the first 2 1/2 years of U.S. participation in the war, Lea had convoy escort duty in the North Atlantic, the Caribbean Sea, and along the eastern seaboard, hazarded by peak U-boat activity and dangerous weather conditions. She rescued survivors from stricken merchant ships as well as fighting off submarines and joining in several successful attacks.

The first of her many wartime rescues at sea came in February 1942, when she took on board the crew of Soviet merchant vessel Dvinoles, abandoned after collision damage. Later that month, 24 February, came a daylong battle with submarines when Lea and fellow escorts again and again dashed out from their convoy screen to keep down attacking U-boats which had sunk four of the merchantmen.

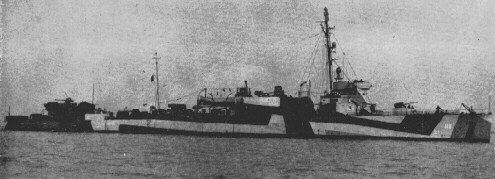
Lea as a convoy escort, painted in dazzle camouflage.

Between 22 April 1943 and 30 May, Lea joined the hunter-killer group formed around the escort carrier Bogue in the first mission of such a group. On 21 May and 22 May, Bogue's aircraft became the first to engage a wolfpack attempting to rendezvous for a mass attack on a convoy. So successful were their six attacks in protecting the convoy that the group was awarded the Presidential Unit Citation in which Lea shared.

== Convoys escorted ==
Convoy	Escort Group	Dates	Notes
	task force 19	1–7 July 1941	occupation of Iceland prior to US declaration of war
HX 153		7–13 Oct 1941	from Newfoundland to Iceland prior to US declaration of war
ON 28		25–30 Oct 1941	from Iceland to Newfoundland prior to US declaration of war
HX 161		23 Nov-3 Dec 1941	from Newfoundland to Iceland prior to US declaration of war
HX 173		3–10 Feb 1942	from Newfoundland to Iceland
ON 67		19–28 Feb 1942	from Iceland to Newfoundland

== Auxiliary service ==
On 31 December 1943, Lea was five days out of New York on convoy escort duty when she was rammed by a merchant ship. Towed to Bermuda and later Boston, she completed repairs on 28 June 1944, and began sailing from Newport as target ship for torpedo planes and escorting carriers during flight training. Between January and June 1945, she had similar duty off Florida. Arriving Philadelphia on 14 June, she decommissioned there on 20 July 1945. Lea was struck from the Navy Register on 13 August 1945. The ship was sold for scrapping to Boston Metals Salvage Company, Baltimore on 30 November 1945.

== Awards ==
- Presidential Unit Citation
- Victory Medal with "DESTROYER" clasp
- American Defense Service Medal with "FLEET" clasp and "A" device
- American Campaign Medal with two battle stars
- European-African-Middle Eastern Campaign Medal with one battle star
- World War II Victory Medal

As of 2013, no other ships in the United States Navy have borne this name.
