= Tennessee's 3rd congressional district =

U.S. House district for Tennessee

Coordinates: 35°45′42″N 84°30′34″W

- Interactive map of district boundaries
- Representative: Chuck Fleischmann; R–Ooltewah
- Distribution: 62.76% urban; 37.24% rural
- Population (2025): 821,447
- Median household income: $75,883
- Ethnicity: 77.8% White; 10.0% Black; 5.8% Hispanic; 4.3% Two or more races; 1.5% Asian; 0.6% other
- Cook PVI: R+18

The 3rd congressional district of Tennessee is a congressional district in East Tennessee. It has been represented by Republican Chuck Fleischmann since January 2011. The third district has been centered on Chattanooga since before the Civil War.

In terms of density, the district is sparsely populated, as much of it is located within the Appalachian Mountains. Almost half of the district's population lives in Hamilton County.

== Composition ==
The district comprises two halves, joined through a narrow tendril in Roane County near Ten Mile. The lower half borders North Carolina to the east and Georgia to the south. For the 118th and successive Congresses (based on redistricting following the 2020 census), the district contains all or portions of the following counties and communities:

Anderson County (7)

All 6 communities

Bradley County (7)

All 7 communities

Campbell County (8)

Caryville, Jacksboro, LaFollette (part; also 2nd), Rocky Top (shared with Anderson County)

Hamilton County (19)

All 19 communities

McMinn County (7)

All 7 communities

Monroe County (7)

All 7 communities

Morgan County (7)

All 7 communities

Polk County (7)

All 3 communities

Roane County (6)

All 6 communities

Scott County (3)

Elgin, Huntsville (part; also 6th), Robbins

Due to county island parcels near Sweetwater, Tennessee, the district (although geographically contiguous) entirely-surrounds three exclaves of Tennessee's 2nd congressional district.

== Recent election results from statewide races ==
Year	Office	Results
2008	President	McCain 62% - 37%
2012	President	Romney 65% - 35%
2016	President	Trump 65% - 30%
2018	Senate	Blackburn 59% - 40%
2018	Governor	Lee 64% - 35%
2020	President	Trump 65% - 33%
2020	Senate	Hagerty 67% - 31%
2022	Governor	Lee 69% - 29%
2024	President	Trump 67% - 31%
2024	Senate	Blackburn 67% - 31%

== History ==
The 3rd district is on the dividing line between counties and towns that favored or opposed Southern secession in the Civil War. George Washington Bridges was elected as a Unionist (the name used by a coalition of Republicans and War Democrats) to the Thirty-seventh Congress, but he was arrested by Confederate troops while en route to Washington, D.C., and taken back to Tennessee. Bridges was held prisoner for more than a year before he escaped and went to Washington, D.C., and assumed his duties on February 23, 1863; serving until March 3, 1863.

During much of the 20th century, southeastern Tennessee was the only portion of traditionally heavily Republican East Tennessee where Democrats were able to compete on a more-or-less even basis. The Chattanooga papers—the moderate-to-progressive Times and the archconservative Free Press (now consolidated into the Chattanooga Times Free Press)—printed diametrically opposed political editorials. The northern counties have predominantly voted Republican since the 1860s, in a manner similar to their neighbors in the present 1st and 2nd districts. However, Democrats have received some support in coal mining areas (dating from the Great Depression). Also, in the years since World War II, the government-founded city of Oak Ridge, with its active labor unions and a population largely derived from outside the region, has been a source of potential Democratic votes.

This balance showed signs of changing beginning in the late 1950s, when rural and working-class whites began splitting their tickets in national elections to support Dwight Eisenhower and Barry Goldwater. In later years, the district warmly supported George Wallace in his third-party run for president in 1968, and gave equally strong support to Richard Nixon and Ronald Reagan, as well as Governors Winfield Dunn and Lamar Alexander. The district has only supported a Democrat for president twice in the last half century, in 1956 and 1992. Even in those cases, that support was almost entirely attributable to the presence of native sons as vice presidential candidates. In 1956, Senator Estes Kefauver, who had represented the 3rd from 1939 to 1949, was the Democratic vice presidential candidate. In 1992, Senator Al Gore was Bill Clinton's running mate, but even with Gore's presence, the Democrats only carried the 3rd by 39 votes out of 225,000 cast.

Even as the district became friendlier to Republicans at the national level, Democrats still held their own at the local level. This trend was broken when Republican Bill Brock won the congressional seat in 1962, ending a 40-year run by Democrats. He handed the seat to fellow Republican LaMar Baker in 1971. However, conservative Democrat Marilyn Lloyd (the widow of a popular television news anchorman in Chattanooga) regained it in 1974 and held it for 20 years. As late as the early 1990s, area Democrats held at least half the local offices in the region, particularly in the southern portion.

As the 1990s wore on, Democrats slowly began losing even county and local offices that they had held for generations. This trend actually began as early as 1992, when Lloyd barely held onto her seat against Republican Zach Wamp. Lloyd retired in 1994, and Wamp narrowly won the race to succeed her as part of that year's massive GOP wave. Wamp was handily reelected in 1996, and the Republicans have held it without serious difficulty since then. Indeed, the Democrats have only cleared 40 percent of the vote twice since Lloyd retired. Redistricting after the 2010 census consolidated the Republican hold on the seat, and it is now one of the most Republican districts in the nation.

Democrats still remain competitive in some local- and state-level races, particularly in Chattanooga and Oak Ridge. Chattanooga also sends some Democrats to the state legislature. However, even moderately liberal politics are a very hard sell, and most of the area's Democrats—particularly outside Chattanooga—are quite conservative on social issues. The 3rd district is home to several Evangelical Protestant denominations and colleges, contributing to the area's social conservatism.

After Wamp's January 2009 announcement that he would run for governor in 2010 instead of seeking re-election, several candidates announced campaigns for the seat. As of March 2010, the Republican field included former state party chairwoman Robin Smith, Air Force Captain Rick Kernea, Tommy Crangle, Chattanooga attorney Chuck Fleischmann, Bradley County sheriff Tim Gobble, Art Rhodes, Van Irion, and Basil Marceaux. Fleischmann won the August 5, 2010 primary with about 28% of the total vote. Democratic candidates as of October 2009 were Paula Flowers of Oak Ridge, a former member of Governor Phil Bredesen's cabinet, and former Libertarian Party member Brent Benedict, who won the 2006 Democratic primary for the seat but lost the general election to Wamp. Both of those Democrats later abandoned their campaigns, but four other candidates placed their names on the ballot for the August 2010 Democratic primary: Alicia Mitchell of Oak Ridge, Brenda Freeman Short of East Ridge, and Brent Staton and John Wolfe of Chattanooga. Wolfe was the winner in the August 5, 2010 primary. Six independents also filed petitions to appear on the November 2010 ballot: Don Barkman, Mark DeVol, Gregory C. Goodwin, Robert Humphries, Mo Kiah and Savas T. Kyriakidis. Republican nominee Chuck Fleischmann won the general election in November 2010 with 57% of the vote, trailed by Democrat John Wolfe with 28%, and independent Savas Kyriakidis with 10%.

== List of members representing the district ==
Name	Years	Cong ress	Party	Electoral history	District location
District established March 4, 1805
William Dickson (Nashville)	March 4, 1805 – March 3, 1807	9th	Democratic-Republican	Redistricted from the at-large district and re-elected in 1805. Retired.	1805–1813 "Metro district"
Jesse Wharton (Nashville)	March 4, 1807 – March 3, 1809	10th	Democratic-Republican	Elected in 1807. Retired.	1805–1813 "Metro district"
Pleasant Moorman Miller (Knoxville)	March 4, 1809 – March 3, 1811	11th	Democratic-Republican	Elected in 1809. Retired.	1805–1813 "Metro district"
Felix Grundy (Nashville)	March 4, 1811 – March 3, 1813	12th	Democratic-Republican	Elected in 1811. Redistricted to the 5th district.	1805–1813 "Metro district"
Thomas K. Harris (Sparta)	March 4, 1813 – March 3, 1815	13th	Democratic-Republican	Elected in 1813. Lost re-election.	1813–1823 [data missing]
Isaac Thomas (Sparta)	March 4, 1815 – March 3, 1817	14th	Democratic-Republican	Elected in 1815. Retired.	1813–1823 [data missing]
Francis Jones (Winchester)	March 4, 1817 – March 3, 1823	15th 16th 17th	Democratic-Republican	Elected in 1817. Re-elected in 1819. Re-elected in 1821. Retired.	1813–1823 [data missing]
James I. Standifer (Pikeville)	March 4, 1823 – March 3, 1825	18th	Democratic-Republican	Elected in 1823. Lost re-election.	1823–1833 [data missing]
James C. Mitchell (Athens)	March 4, 1825 – March 3, 1829	19th 20th	Jacksonian	Elected in 1825. Re-elected in 1827. Lost re-election.	1823–1833 [data missing]
James I. Standifer (Mount Airy)	March 4, 1829 – March 3, 1833	21st 22nd	Jacksonian	Elected in 1829. Re-elected in 1831. Redistricted to the 4th district.	1823–1833 [data missing]
Luke Lea (Campbells Station)	March 4, 1833 – March 3, 1835	23rd 24th	Jacksonian	Elected in 1833. Re-elected in 1835. Retired.	1833–1843 [data missing]
Luke Lea (Campbells Station)	March 4, 1835 – March 3, 1837	23rd 24th	Anti-Jacksonian	Elected in 1833. Re-elected in 1835. Retired.	1833–1843 [data missing]
Joseph L. Williams (Knoxville)	March 4, 1837 – March 3, 1843	25th 26th 27th	Whig	Elected in 1837. Re-elected in 1839. Re-elected in 1841. Lost renomination.	1833–1843 [data missing]
Julius W. Blackwell (Athens)	March 4, 1843 – March 3, 1845	28th	Democratic	Elected in 1842. Lost re-election.	1843–1853 [data missing]
John H. Crozier (Knoxville)	March 4, 1845 – March 3, 1849	29th 30th	Whig	Elected in 1845. Re-elected in 1847. Retired.	1843–1853 [data missing]
Josiah M. Anderson (Fairview)	March 4, 1849 – March 3, 1851	31st	Whig	Elected in 1849. Lost re-election.	1843–1853 [data missing]
William M. Churchwell (Knoxville)	March 4, 1851 – March 3, 1853	32nd	Democratic	Elected in 1851. Redistricted to the 2nd district.	1843–1853 [data missing]
Samuel A. Smith (Charleston)	March 4, 1853 – March 3, 1859	33rd 34th 35th	Democratic	Elected in 1853. Re-elected in 1855. Re-elected in 1857. Lost re-election.	1853–1863 [data missing]
Reese B. Brabson (Chattanooga)	March 4, 1859 – March 3, 1861	36th	Opposition	Elected in 1859. Retired.	1853–1863 [data missing]
George W. Bridges (Athens)	March 4, 1861 – March 3, 1863	37th	Union	Elected in 1861 but initially unable to take seat when taken prisoner by the Confederate Army. Seated February 25, 1863 after escaping a Confederate prison. Unable to seek re-election, as state was under Confederate occupation.	1853–1863 [data missing]
District inactive	March 4, 1863 – July 24, 1866	38th 39th	Civil War and Reconstruction		
William B. Stokes (Alexandria)	July 24, 1866 – March 3, 1867	39th 40th 41st	Union	Elected in 1865. Re-elected in 1867. Re-elected in 1868. Lost re-election.	1866–1873 [data missing]
William B. Stokes (Alexandria)	March 4, 1867 – March 3, 1871	39th 40th 41st	Republican	Elected in 1865. Re-elected in 1867. Re-elected in 1868. Lost re-election.	1866–1873 [data missing]
Abraham E. Garrett (Carthage)	March 4, 1871 – March 3, 1873	42nd	Democratic	Elected in 1870. Redistricted to the 2nd district and lost re-election.	1866–1873 [data missing]
William Crutchfield (Chattanooga)	March 4, 1873 – March 3, 1875	43rd	Republican	Elected in 1872. Retired.	1873–1883 [data missing]
George G. Dibrell (Sparta)	March 4, 1875 – March 3, 1885	44th 45th 46th 47th 48th	Democratic	Elected in 1874. Re-elected in 1876. Re-elected in 1878. Re-elected in 1880. Re-elected in 1882. Retired.	1873–1883 [data missing]
George G. Dibrell (Sparta)	March 4, 1875 – March 3, 1885	44th 45th 46th 47th 48th	Democratic	Elected in 1874. Re-elected in 1876. Re-elected in 1878. Re-elected in 1880. Re-elected in 1882. Retired.	1883–1893 [data missing]
John R. Neal (Rhea Springs)	March 4, 1885 – March 3, 1889	49th 50th	Democratic	Elected in 1884. Re-elected in 1886. Retired.	1883–1893 [data missing]
Henry Clay Evans (Chattanooga)	March 4, 1889 – March 3, 1891	51st	Republican	Elected in 1888. Lost re-election.	1883–1893 [data missing]
Henry C. Snodgrass (Sparta)	March 4, 1891 – March 3, 1895	52nd 53rd	Democratic	Elected in 1890. Re-elected in 1892. Lost re-election.	1883–1893 [data missing]
Henry C. Snodgrass (Sparta)	March 4, 1891 – March 3, 1895	52nd 53rd	Democratic	Elected in 1890. Re-elected in 1892. Lost re-election.	1893–1903 [data missing]
Foster V. Brown (Chattanooga)	March 4, 1895 – March 3, 1897	54th	Republican	Elected in 1894. Retired.	1893–1903 [data missing]
John A. Moon (Chattanooga)	March 4, 1897 – March 3, 1921	55th 56th 57th 58th 59th 60th 61st 62nd 63rd 64th 65th 66th	Democratic	Elected in 1896. Re-elected in 1898. Re-elected in 1900. Re-elected in 1902. Re-elected in 1904. Re-elected in 1906. Re-elected in 1908. Re-elected in 1910. Re-elected in 1912. Re-elected in 1914. Re-elected in 1916. Re-elected in 1918. Lost re-election.	1893–1903 [data missing]
John A. Moon (Chattanooga)	March 4, 1897 – March 3, 1921	55th 56th 57th 58th 59th 60th 61st 62nd 63rd 64th 65th 66th	Democratic	Elected in 1896. Re-elected in 1898. Re-elected in 1900. Re-elected in 1902. Re-elected in 1904. Re-elected in 1906. Re-elected in 1908. Re-elected in 1910. Re-elected in 1912. Re-elected in 1914. Re-elected in 1916. Re-elected in 1918. Lost re-election.	1903–1913 [data missing]
John A. Moon (Chattanooga)	March 4, 1897 – March 3, 1921	55th 56th 57th 58th 59th 60th 61st 62nd 63rd 64th 65th 66th	Democratic	Elected in 1896. Re-elected in 1898. Re-elected in 1900. Re-elected in 1902. Re-elected in 1904. Re-elected in 1906. Re-elected in 1908. Re-elected in 1910. Re-elected in 1912. Re-elected in 1914. Re-elected in 1916. Re-elected in 1918. Lost re-election.	1913–1923 [data missing]
Joseph E. Brown (Chattanooga)	March 4, 1921 – March 3, 1923	67th	Republican	Elected in 1920. Retired.	1913–1923 [data missing]
Sam D. McReynolds (Chattanooga)	March 4, 1923 – July 11, 1939	68th 69th 70th 71st 72nd 73rd 74th 75th 76th	Democratic	Elected in 1922. Re-elected in 1924. Re-elected in 1926. Re-elected in 1928. Re-elected in 1930. Re-elected in 1932. Re-elected in 1934. Re-elected in 1936. Re-elected in 1938. Died.	1923–1933 [data missing]
Sam D. McReynolds (Chattanooga)	March 4, 1923 – July 11, 1939	68th 69th 70th 71st 72nd 73rd 74th 75th 76th	Democratic	Elected in 1922. Re-elected in 1924. Re-elected in 1926. Re-elected in 1928. Re-elected in 1930. Re-elected in 1932. Re-elected in 1934. Re-elected in 1936. Re-elected in 1938. Died.	1933–1943 [data missing]
Vacant	July 11, 1939 – September 13, 1939	76th			1933–1943 [data missing]
Estes Kefauver (Chattanooga)	September 13, 1939 – January 3, 1949	76th 77th 78th 79th 80th	Democratic	Elected to finish McReynolds's term. Re-elected in 1940. Re-elected in 1942. Re-elected in 1944. Re-elected in 1946. Retired to run for U.S. senator.	1933–1943 [data missing]
Estes Kefauver (Chattanooga)	September 13, 1939 – January 3, 1949	76th 77th 78th 79th 80th	Democratic	Elected to finish McReynolds's term. Re-elected in 1940. Re-elected in 1942. Re-elected in 1944. Re-elected in 1946. Retired to run for U.S. senator.	1943–1953 [data missing]
James B. Frazier Jr. (Chattanooga)	January 3, 1949 – January 3, 1963	81st 82nd 83rd 84th 85th 86th 87th	Democratic	Elected in 1948. Re-elected in 1950. Re-elected in 1952. Re-elected in 1954. Re-elected in 1956. Re-elected in 1958. Re-elected in 1960. Lost renomination.	1943–1953 [data missing]
James B. Frazier Jr. (Chattanooga)	January 3, 1949 – January 3, 1963	81st 82nd 83rd 84th 85th 86th 87th	Democratic	Elected in 1948. Re-elected in 1950. Re-elected in 1952. Re-elected in 1954. Re-elected in 1956. Re-elected in 1958. Re-elected in 1960. Lost renomination.	1953–1963 [data missing]
Bill Brock (Chattanooga)	January 3, 1963 – January 3, 1971	88th 89th 90th 91st	Republican	Elected in 1962. Re-elected in 1964. Re-elected in 1966. Re-elected in 1968. Retired to run for U.S. senator.	1963–1973 [data missing]
LaMar Baker (Chattanooga)	January 3, 1971 – January 3, 1975	92nd 93rd	Republican	Elected in 1970. Re-elected in 1972. Lost re-election.	1963–1973 [data missing]
LaMar Baker (Chattanooga)	January 3, 1971 – January 3, 1975	92nd 93rd	Republican	Elected in 1970. Re-elected in 1972. Lost re-election.	1973–1983 [data missing]
Marilyn Lloyd (Chattanooga)	January 3, 1975 – January 3, 1995	94th 95th 96th 97th 98th 99th 100th 101st 102nd 103rd	Democratic	Elected in 1974. Re-elected in 1976. Re-elected in 1978. Re-elected in 1980. Re-elected in 1982. Re-elected in 1984. Re-elected in 1986. Re-elected in 1988. Re-elected in 1990. Re-elected in 1992. Retired.	1973–1983 [data missing]
Marilyn Lloyd (Chattanooga)	January 3, 1975 – January 3, 1995	94th 95th 96th 97th 98th 99th 100th 101st 102nd 103rd	Democratic	Elected in 1974. Re-elected in 1976. Re-elected in 1978. Re-elected in 1980. Re-elected in 1982. Re-elected in 1984. Re-elected in 1986. Re-elected in 1988. Re-elected in 1990. Re-elected in 1992. Retired.	1983–1993 [data missing]
Marilyn Lloyd (Chattanooga)	January 3, 1975 – January 3, 1995	94th 95th 96th 97th 98th 99th 100th 101st 102nd 103rd	Democratic	Elected in 1974. Re-elected in 1976. Re-elected in 1978. Re-elected in 1980. Re-elected in 1982. Re-elected in 1984. Re-elected in 1986. Re-elected in 1988. Re-elected in 1990. Re-elected in 1992. Retired.	1993–2003 [data missing]
Zach Wamp (Chattanooga)	January 3, 1995 – January 3, 2011	104th 105th 106th 107th 108th 109th 110th 111th	Republican	Elected in 1994. Re-elected in 1996. Re-elected in 1998. Re-elected in 2000. Re-elected in 2002. Re-elected in 2004. Re-elected in 2006. Re-elected in 2008. Retired to run for Governor of Tennessee.	1993–2003 [data missing]
Zach Wamp (Chattanooga)	January 3, 1995 – January 3, 2011	104th 105th 106th 107th 108th 109th 110th 111th	Republican	Elected in 1994. Re-elected in 1996. Re-elected in 1998. Re-elected in 2000. Re-elected in 2002. Re-elected in 2004. Re-elected in 2006. Re-elected in 2008. Retired to run for Governor of Tennessee.	2003–2013
Chuck Fleischmann (Ooltewah)	January 3, 2011 – present	112th 113th 114th 115th 116th 117th 118th 119th	Republican	Elected in 2010. Re-elected in 2012. Re-elected in 2014. Re-elected in 2016. Re-elected in 2018. Re-elected in 2020. Re-elected in 2022. Re-elected in 2024. Re-elected in 2026.	2003–2013
Chuck Fleischmann (Ooltewah)	January 3, 2011 – present	112th 113th 114th 115th 116th 117th 118th 119th	Republican	Elected in 2010. Re-elected in 2012. Re-elected in 2014. Re-elected in 2016. Re-elected in 2018. Re-elected in 2020. Re-elected in 2022. Re-elected in 2024. Re-elected in 2026.	2013–2023
Chuck Fleischmann (Ooltewah)	January 3, 2011 – present	112th 113th 114th 115th 116th 117th 118th 119th	Republican	Elected in 2010. Re-elected in 2012. Re-elected in 2014. Re-elected in 2016. Re-elected in 2018. Re-elected in 2020. Re-elected in 2022. Re-elected in 2024. Re-elected in 2026.	2023–2027

== Recent election results ==
=== 2012 ===
Tennessee's 3rd congressional district, 2012
Party	Candidate	Votes	%
Republican	Chuck Fleischmann (incumbent)	157,830	61.5
Democratic	Mary Headrick	91,094	35.4
Independent	Matthew Deniston	7,905	3.1
Total votes		256,829	100
Republican hold			

=== 2014 ===
Tennessee's 3rd congressional district, 2014
Party	Candidate	Votes	%
Republican	Chuck Fleischmann (incumbent)	97,344	62.3
Democratic	Mary M. Headrick	53,983	34.6
Independent	Cassandra J. Mitchell	4,770	3.1
Total votes		156,097	100.0
Republican hold			

=== 2016 ===
Tennessee's 3rd congressional district, 2016
Party	Candidate	Votes	%
Republican	Chuck Fleischmann (incumbent)	176,613	66.4
Democratic	Melody Shekari	76,727	28.9
Independent	Rick Tyler	5,098	1.9
Independent	Cassandra Mitchell	5,075	1.9
Independent	Topher Kersting	2,493	0.9
Total votes		266,006	100.0
Republican hold			

=== 2018 ===
Tennessee's 3rd congressional district, 2018
Party	Candidate	Votes	%
Republican	Chuck Fleischmann (incumbent)	156,512	63.7
Democratic	Danielle Mitchell	84,731	34.5
Independent	Rick Tyler	4,522	1.8
Total votes		245,765	100.0
Republican hold			

=== 2020 ===
Tennessee's 3rd congressional district, 2020
Party	Candidate	Votes	%
Republican	Chuck Fleischmann (incumbent)	215,571	67.3
Democratic	Meg Gorman	97,687	30.5
Independent	Amber Hysell	5,043	1.6
Independent	Keith Sweitzer	1,990	0.6
Write-in		8	0.0
Total votes		320,299	100.0
Republican hold			

=== 2022 ===
Tennessee's 3rd congressional district, 2022
Party	Candidate	Votes	%
Republican	Chuck Fleischmann (incumbent)	136,639	68.3
Democratic	Meg Gorman	60,334	30.1
Independent	Rick Tyler	1,736	0.8
Independent	Thomas Rumba	1,121	0.5
Total votes		199,830	100.0
Republican hold			

=== 2024 ===
Tennessee's 3rd congressional district, 2024
Party	Candidate	Votes	%
Republican	Chuck Fleischmann (incumbent)	236,519	67.51%
Democratic	Jack Allen	102,841	29.36%
Independent	Stephen King	5,848	1.67%
Independent	Jean Howard-Hill	5,120	1.46%
Total votes		350,328	100.00%
Republican hold			

== See also ==
- Tennessee's congressional districts
- List of United States congressional districts
