= William Stone (Tennessee politician) =

American politician

Member of the U.S. House of Representatives from Tennessee's 4th district
- In office September 14, 1837 – March 3, 1839
- Preceded by: James I. Standifer
- Succeeded by: Julius W. Blackwell

Personal details
- Born: January 26, 1791 Sevier County, Southwest Territory
- Died: February 18, 1853 (aged 62) Sequatchie County, Tennessee, U.S.
- Party: Whig
- Spouse: Mary Randall Stone
- Profession: Politician

William Stone (January 26, 1791 – February 18, 1853) was a U.S. Representative from Tennessee.

== Biography ==
Born in Sevier County in the portion of the Southwest Territory that is now Tennessee, Stone completed preparatory studies. He married Mary Randall. They had seven children, three boys and four girls.

== Career ==
About 1808, Stone and other members of his family moved by wagon train to Sequatchie County, Tennessee. He held several local offices. He owned slaves.

Stone was a captain in the Creek War and served with General Andrew Jackson in the Louisiana Campaign and was present at the Battle of New Orleans. He was presented a cane by Congress for bravery in the Battle of Tippecanoe, and was made brevet brigadier general for gallantry at the Battle of Horseshoe Bend.

An unsuccessful Whig candidate for election in 1836 to the Twenty-fifth Congress, Stone was subsequently elected to the Twenty-fifth Congress to fill the vacancy caused by the death of James Standifer and served from September 14, 1837, to March 3, 1839. He was an unsuccessful candidate for reelection to the Twenty-sixth Congress.

== Death ==
Stone died in Delphi (later Davis), Sequatchie County, Tennessee, on February 18, 1853 (age 62 years, 23 days). He is interred at the family burying ground at Delphi.
