= Joseph Lanier Williams =

American politician

Member of the U.S. House of Representatives from Tennessee's 3rd district
- In office March 4, 1837 – March 3, 1843
- Preceded by: Luke Lea
- Succeeded by: Julius W. Blackwell

Personal details
- Born: October 23, 1810 Knoxville, Tennessee, U.S.
- Died: December 14, 1865 (aged 55) Knoxville, Tennessee, U.S.
- Party: Whig
- Spouse: Malinda R. Williams
- Education: University of East Tennessee United States Military Academy
- Profession: Lawyer, politician

Joseph Lanier Williams (October 23, 1810 – December 14, 1865) was an American politician who represented Tennessee's third district in the United States House of Representatives.

== Biography ==
Williams was born near Knoxville, Tennessee on October 23, 1810. After completing preparatory studies, he attended the University of East Tennessee and attended the United States Military Academy at West Point. He studied law, was admitted to the bar, and commenced practice in Knoxville, Tennessee. He married Malinda R. Williams and they had four children.

== Career ==
Williams was elected as a Whig to the Twenty-fifth, Twenty-sixth, and Twenty-seven Congresses. He served from March 4, 1837, to March 3, 1843. He was an unsuccessful candidate for renomination in 1842. He engaged in the practice of law in Washington, D.C.

Williams was appointed judge of the Dakota Territorial Supreme Court by President Abraham Lincoln, and served in that capacity from 1861 to 1865. Historian Doane Robinson wrote of Williams, and his contemporary B. P. Williston, that "[n]either Williston or Williams left a record, or made an impression from which any adequate judgment of their efficiency may be ascertained".

== Death ==
Williams died in Knoxville, Tennessee on December 14, 1865 (aged 55 years, 52 days). He is interred in Old Gray Cemetery in Knoxville. He was the son of U.S. Senator John Williams.

U.S. House of Representatives
Preceded by Luke Lea	Member of the U.S. House of Representatives from Tennessee's 3rd congressional district 1837–1843	Succeeded by Julius W. Blackwell
