= John Hervey Crozier =

American attorney and politician from Tennessee (1812–1889)

Member of the U.S. House of Representatives from Tennessee's 3rd district
- In office March 4, 1845 – March 3, 1849
- Preceded by: Julius W. Blackwell
- Succeeded by: Josiah M. Anderson

Personal details
- Born: February 10, 1812 Knoxville, Tennessee, U.S.
- Died: October 25, 1889 (aged 77) Knoxville, Tennessee, U.S.
- Party: Whig
- Spouse: Mary Williams
- Children: Etheldred Crozier; Cornelia Crozier; John Crozier, Jr. James Crozier; Lizzie Crozier French; Lucy Crozier; Mary Crozier; Anna Crozier
- Education: East Tennessee College
- Occupation: Attorney

John Hervey Crozier (February 10, 1812 – October 25, 1889) was an American attorney and politician active primarily in Knoxville, Tennessee, USA, during the mid-nineteenth century. Described as "an orator of uncommon brilliancy" and "one of the brainiest men ever sent by Tennessee to congress," Crozier represented Tennessee's 3rd congressional district in the United States House of Representatives from 1845 to 1849. While originally a member of the Whig Party, Crozier switched his allegiance to the Democratic Party in the 1850s, and supported the Confederacy during the Civil War. Crozier retired from public life after the war, and spent his remaining years engaged in scholarly pursuits.

== Biography ==
=== Early life and career ===
Crozier was born in Knoxville on February 10, 1812, the youngest son of Captain John and Hannah Barton Crozier. Crozier's father, an immigrant from County Fermanagh in Northern Ireland, was among the earliest settlers in Knoxville, and served as Knoxville's postmaster from 1804 until 1838. Peggy Barton Crozier (one Crozier's sisters), was the eldest daughter of John and Hannah Barton Crozier, and had married Dr. J.G.M. Ramsey on March 1, 1823 while her parents were then residing at Fruit Hill.

After attending public schools, the younger Crozier graduated from East Tennessee College (now the University of Tennessee) in 1829. He was admitted to the Tennessee bar, and practiced law in Knoxville. In 1835, after Knox County attorney-general John Nelson resigned, Crozier was appointed to fill out his term.

From 1837 to 1839, Crozier represented Knox County in the Tennessee House of Representatives. In 1839, he was elected to Knoxville's Board of Aldermen, and in 1844, he was a presidential elector for the Clay/Frelinghuysen ticket. Crozier was elected to the Twenty-ninth and Thirtieth congresses, serving from March 4, 1845 to March 3, 1849. During the Thirtieth Congress, he was chairman of the Committee on Expenditures in the Department of War, although he opposed the then-ongoing Mexican–American War. Crozier also obtained $50,000 in federal funding for navigational improvements to the Tennessee River, which he hoped would eventually connect Knoxville and Chattanooga to the nation's inland waterways.

After his second term, Crozier resumed the practice of law in Knoxville, and along with his brother-in-law, J. G. M. Ramsey, championed railroad construction in the region. Crozier supported Whig candidate Winfield Scott during the presidential election of 1852, but after the Whig Party disintegrated in subsequent months, he affiliated himself with the Democratic Party. Crozier supported Democratic presidential candidate James Buchanan in 1856, and campaigned in Knoxville on behalf of Southern Democrat John C. Breckinridge during the presidential election of 1860.

=== The Civil War ===
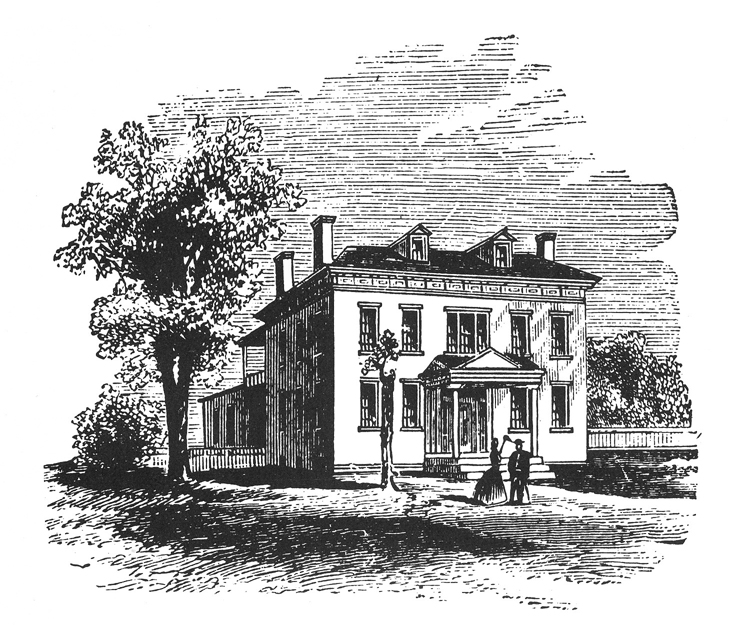
Crozier's house on Gay Street was headquarters to General Ambrose Burnside during the Federal occupation of Knoxville in 1863.

Crozier's defection to the Democratic Party resumed a string of personal attacks from Knoxville Whig editor, William "Parson" Brownlow, which Crozier later claimed drove him from public life. During the presidential campaign of 1860, Crozier and Brownlow attacked one another in speeches, and continued quarrelling via newspaper editorials in 1861 as they stood on opposite sides of the secession debate. Brownlow called Crozier "a corrupt demagogue, a selfish liar, and an unmitigated coward," while Crozier argued that Brownlow had earned his fortune by publishing lies. In December 1861, Crozier's nephew, Confederate district attorney J. C. Ramsey, had Brownlow jailed for treason.

When the Union Army occupied Knoxville in September 1863, General Ambrose Burnside chose as his headquarters Crozier's house at the corner of Gay Street and Clinch Avenue (now the location of the Hyatt Place Knoxville/Downtown). Crozier's extensive personal library made his house the ideal choice for Burnside, an avid reader. During the waning years of the war, Crozier made amends with the city's Unionists. In 1865, Brownlow won a $25,000 (~$411,288 in 2025) judgement against Crozier and two other Confederate leaders, but the decision was eventually annulled.

=== Later life ===
After the war, Crozier retired from practice to engage in "literary pursuits." In 1869, he delivered a lecture before the Young Men's Literary Society entitled, "What Studies Most Expand the Human Mind?" In 1883, he helped revive the East Tennessee Historical Society, which he and his brother-in-law, J. G. M. Ramsey, had established in 1834. Crozier died in Knoxville on October 25, 1889, and was interred in Old Gray Cemetery. Following family tradition, his grave was not individually marked (the family plot is currently marked by a monument with the single name of "Crozier").

Crozier's daughter, Lizzie Crozier French, led efforts for women's suffrage and coeducation in Tennessee. His son, John Crozier, Jr., was an early aviation pioneer who began building a human-powered flying machine in the 1890s, but was killed in a feud in Grainger County before he could complete it.

U.S. House of Representatives
Preceded by Julius W. Blackwell	Member of the U.S. House of Representatives from Tennessee's 3rd congressional district 1845–1849	Succeeded by Josiah M. Anderson
