= John Henry Bowen =

American politician

Member of the U.S. House of Representatives from Tennessee's 4th district
- In office March 4, 1813 – March 3, 1815
- Preceded by: District created
- Succeeded by: Bennett H. Henderson

Personal details
- Born: September 1780 Washington County, Virginia
- Died: September 25, 1822 (aged 41–42) Gallatin, Tennessee
- Party: Democratic-Republican
- Spouse: Elizabeth Allen Bowen
- Children: Mary Bowen Yerger; Grant Allen Bowen
- Profession: lawyer; soldier; politician

John Henry Bowen (September 1780 – September 25, 1822) was an American politician who represented Tennessee in the United States House of Representatives.

== Biography ==
Bowen was born in Washington County, Virginia in September 1780, son of Captain William Bowen and Mary Henley Russell. He moved with his parents to Sumner County in 1784. When he was sixteen years of age, he attended school in Lexington, Kentucky. In approximately 1800, he studied law in the office of John Breckinridge in Lexington and was admitted to bar.

== Career ==
After two years Bowen returned home and began practice of law in Gallatin, Tennessee and soon gained prominence. He was a colonel in the Continental Army.

Bowen was elected to the Thirteenth Congress, which lasted from March 4, 1813 to March 3, 1815, as a Democratic-Republican. He then continued to engage in the practice of law in Gallatin until his death there.

In 1815 Bowen married Elizabeth Allen. They had four children; two who died young, and two who reared large families. The eldest, Mary, married Judge Jacob S. Yerger of Greenville, Miss. a member of the famous Yerger family formerly of Lebanon. They had three sons killed in the Confederate army. Grant Allen Bowen married Amanda Yerger. They left two children John H. Jr., and Mary.

== Death and legacy ==
Bowen died on September 25, 1822, at about age 42 years. The location of his interment is unknown. His brick home, bought by Governor William Trousdale, was presented by the widow, Mrs. Anne Berry Trousdale, to the Daughters of the Confederacy.

U.S. House of Representatives
Preceded by District created	Member of the U.S. House of Representatives from Tennessee's 4th congressional district 1813-1815	Succeeded by John H. Bowen
