= Bennett H. Henderson =

American politician

Bennett Hillsman Henderson

Member of the U.S. House of Representatives from Tennessee's 4th district
- In office March 4, 1815 – March 3, 1817
- Preceded by: John H. Bowen
- Succeeded by: Samuel E. Hogg

Personal details
- Born: February 23, 1782 Bedford, Virginia
- Died: October 12, 1849 (aged 67) Summitville, Tennessee
- Party: Democratic-Republican

Bennett Hillsman Henderson (February 23, 1782 – October 12, 1849) was an American politician who represented Tennessee in the United States House of Representatives.

== Biography ==
Henderson was born on February 23, 1782, in Bedford, Virginia son of William and Lockey Henderson. His family moved to Tennessee about 1790. He was elected as a Democratic-Republican to the Fourteenth Congress, which lasted from March 4, 1815 to March 3, 1817. He served from December 4, 1815 to March 3, 1817.

== Death ==
Henderson died in Summitville, Tennessee in 1849.

U.S. House of Representatives
Preceded by John H. Bowen	Member of the U.S. House of Representatives from Tennessee's 4th congressional district 1815-1817	Succeeded by Samuel E. Hogg
