= Jacob C. Isacks =

American politician (1767–1835)

Member of the U.S. House of Representatives from Tennessee's 4th district
- In office March 4, 1823 – March 3, 1833
- Preceded by: Robert Allen
- Succeeded by: James I. Standifer

Personal details
- Born: January 1, 1767 Montgomery County, Province of Pennsylvania, British America
- Died: August 31, 1835 (aged 68) Winchester, Tennessee, U.S.
- Party: Jackson Democratic-Republican
- Profession: politician

Jacob C. Isacks (January 1, 1767 – August 31, 1835) was an American politician who represented Tennessee in the United States House of Representatives.

== Biography ==
Isacks was born in Montgomery County in the Province of Pennsylvania and later moved to Winchester, Tennessee. He was elected as a Jackson Democratic-Republican to the Eighteenth Congress and was re-elected as a Jacksonian to the Nineteenth through Twenty-second Congresses. He was in office from March 4, 1821 to March 3, 1833. He was chairman of the U.S. House Committee on Public Lands during the Twentieth and Twenty-first Congresses. He was an unsuccessful candidate for re-election in 1832. He owned slaves. He died in Winchester, Tennessee. The location of his place of interment is unknown.

U.S. House of Representatives
Preceded by Robert Allen	Member of the U.S. House of Representatives from Tennessee's 4th congressional district 1821-1833	Succeeded by James I. Standifer
