= Robert Allen (Tennessee politician) =

American politician

Member of the U.S. House of Representatives from Tennessee
- In office March 4, 1819 – March 3, 1827
- Preceded by: Samuel E. Hogg (4th); Newton Cannon (5th)
- Succeeded by: Jacob C. Isacks (4th); Robert Desha (5th)
- Constituency: 4th district (1819-23); 5th district (1823-27)

Personal details
- Born: June 19, 1778 Augusta County, Virginia
- Died: August 19, 1844 (aged 66)
- Party: Democratic-Republican
- Other political affiliations: Jackson Republican
- Spouses: Rebecca Greer Allen; Alethia Van Horn Allen
- Children: Eliza Allen; James Greer Allen; Tilman Dixon Allen; Caroline Walton Allen; Rebecca Greer Allen; Joseph Webster Allen; Robert Allen; George Campbell Allen; Mary Greer Allen; Archibald Van Horn Allen; David Burford Allen; William Rozin Allen; Alethia Beale Allen; John Q. Allen; Eliza Clarisa Allen; William B Allen; Virginia Dixon Allen
- Education: College of William and Mary
- Profession: lawyer; politician

Robert Allen (June 19, 1778 – August 19, 1844) was an American merchant and politician from Carthage, Tennessee. He represented Tennessee in the United States House of Representatives from 1819 until 1827.

== Biography ==
Allen was born in Augusta County, Virginia, and attended schools there, culminating in the College of William & Mary. He married Rebecca Greer on December 28, 1803, in Jonesboro, Tennessee. After graduating from his law studies, he moved to Carthage, Tennessee and took up the Mercantile business as well as practicing as a lawyer in 1804. He also served as Clerk of Smith County for many years. He owned slaves.

== Career ==
During the War of 1812, Allen served as a colonel under General Andrew Jackson. After the war, he was elected to the United States House of Representatives, serving four terms. While there, he chaired the U.S. House Committee on Revolutionary Claims (regarding claims from the U.S. Revolutionary War). His wife, Rebecca died on March 29, 1822; and he married Alethia Van Horn on March 3, 1825. He declined to stand for re-election in the 1826 elections, and retired to Tennessee at the end of the term. He was a delegate to the State convention in 1834.

== Death ==
Allen engaged in farming and mercantile pursuits until his death in Carthage, Smith County, Tennessee, on August 19, 1844 (age 66 years, 61 days). He is interred at Cedar Grove Cemetery, Wilson County, Tennessee. He died at "Greenwood," his plantation near Carthage.

== See also ==
- Eliza Allen (Tennessee), first wife of Sam Houston, Robert's niece

U.S. House of Representatives
Preceded by Samuel E. Hogg	Member of the U.S. House of Representatives from Tennessee's 4th congressional district 1819-1823	Succeeded by Jacob C. Isacks
Preceded by Newton Cannon	Member of the U.S. House of Representatives from Tennessee's 5th congressional district 1823-1827	Succeeded by Robert Desha
