= Francis Jones (American politician) =

American politician (c. 1788–1826)

Member of the U.S. House of Representatives from Tennessee's 3rd district
- In office March 4, 1817 – March 3, 1823
- Preceded by: Isaac Thomas
- Succeeded by: James I. Standifer

Personal details
- Born: c. 1788 Tennessee, U.S.
- Died: July 31, 1826 (aged c. 38) Jefferson County, Alabama, U.S.
- Party: Democratic-Republican
- Profession: lawyer; politician

Francis Jones (c. 1788 – July 31, 1826) was an American politician who represented Tennessee in the United States House of Representatives.

== Early life ==
Jones was born in Tennessee in about 1788. Although he received a limited schooling; he studied law, and was admitted to the bar.

== Career ==
Jones began his practice in Winchester, Tennessee. David Crockett tells in his autobiography about the strong feelings that brought him to volunteer. According to Crockett's book, a young local lawyer named Francis Jones made a fiery speech, then volunteered and was elected captain, and later represented the district in Congress. During the Creek War, Jones had his own company of Tennessee Volunteer Mounted Riflemen.

Jones was elected Solicitor General of the third Tennessee district in 1815.

Jones was elected as a Democratic-Republican to the Fifteenth, Sixteenth, and Seventeenth Congresses. He served from March 4, 1817 to March 3, 1823, then resumed the practice of his profession in Winchester.

== Death ==
Jones died at the age of about 38 on July 31, 1826, in Jefferson County, Alabama, while returning from a session of the state supreme court in Tuscaloosa to his home in Huntsville.

U.S. House of Representatives
Preceded by Isaac Thomas	Member of the U.S. House of Representatives from Tennessee's 3rd congressional district 1817-1823	Succeeded by James I. Standifer
