= James Israel Standifer =

American politician

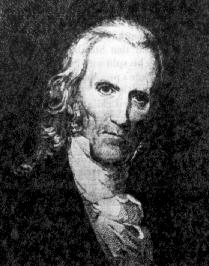

Member of the U.S. House of Representatives from Tennessee
- In office March 4, 1823 – March 4, 1825
- Preceded by: Francis Jones
- Succeeded by: James C. Mitchell
- Constituency: 3rd district
- In office March 4, 1829 – August 20, 1837
- Preceded by: James C. Mitchell (3rd); Jacob C. Isacks (4th)
- Succeeded by: Luke Lea (3rd); William Stone (4th)
- Constituency: 3rd district (1829-33); 4th district (1833–37)

Personal details
- Born: April 19, 1779 Virginia
- Died: August 20, 1837 (aged 58)
- Spouse: Martha "Patsy" Standifer
- Children: Children:James Madison Standifer; Skelton Carroll Standifer; William Israel S. Standifer; Luke C. Standifer; Elizabeth Ann Standifer; Jesse Heard Standifer
- Education: University of Tennessee
- Profession: politician

James Israel Standifer (April 19, 1779 – August 20, 1837) was an American politician who represented Tennessee in the United States House of Representatives.

== Biography ==
Standifer was born on April 19, 1779, in Henry County, son of Israel and Susannah Heard Standifer. He married his cousin, Martha "Patsy" Standifer on February 2, 1801, in Knox County, Tennessee. She was the daughter of William and Jemima Jones Standifer, born January 19, 1783, in Henry County, Virginia, and died June 15, 1848, in Tennessee. He attended the common schools and graduated from the University of Tennessee at Knoxville. He owned slaves.

== Career ==
During the War of 1812, Standifer enlisted as a private, was promoted to captain and served from September 30, 1813, to December 30, 1813. He reenlisted on January 20, 1814, and served under Colonel John Brown in the East Tennessee Volunteer Mounted Gunmen. He was promoted to lieutenant colonel, and served until March 11, 1814.

Standifer was elected to the Eighteenth Congress, representing the 3rd district, which lasted from March 4, 1823, to March 4, 1825. He was also elected as a Jacksonian to the Twenty-first Congress through the Twenty-third Congress, as a White supporter (Anti-Jacksonian) to the Twenty-fourth Congress, and as a Whig to the Twenty-fifth Congress. He served from March 4, 1829, until his death near Kingston, Tennessee, on his way to Washington, D.C.

When White ran for president in 1836, it split the Democratic Party in Tennessee so badly that the Whigs carried the state in presidential elections for the next twenty years. President Jackson demanded the Tennessee congressional delegation back his vice president, Martin Van Buren of New York, as his successor. From a review of the historical record, it is clear that Congressman James Standifer, who represented the Sequatchie Valley just west of modern Chattanooga, was the chief instigator of the presidential campaign of Hugh Lawson White (see "James Standifer, Sequatchie Valley Congressman," by Steve Byas, Tennessee Historical Quarterly, Summer 1991).

== Death ==
Standifer died near Kingston, Roane County, Tennessee, on August 20, 1837 (age about 55 years) while returning to Washington for a Congressional session. He is interred at Baptist Cemetery, Kingston, Tennessee**. The cause cited for his death was pneumonia.

  - According to the assistant archivist for Roane County, TN.:

They have death records as far back as 1804 and they have never come across this man or any record of his death. She said that back then, the government would send out a coroner to investigate an official's death to make sure he had not been murdered. Since he was a Congressman, there would have been some record of him being in (or even passing thru) Kingston ~ especially if he died somewhere in Roane county. The Historical Society has recorded almost all the cemeteries in the county and has never come across anything for this man. She said "it's a story that just won't die". She also stated that there is no record of a "Baptist Cemetery" in Kingston, TN.

While the assistant archivist for Roane County finds no record of his death there, his death was reported in newspapers around the country, and multiple papers listed the death as "near Kingston."

== See also ==
- List of members of the United States Congress who died in office (1790–1899)

U.S. House of Representatives
Preceded by Francis Jones	Member of the U.S. House of Representatives from Tennessee's 3rd congressional district 1823-1825	Succeeded by James C. Mitchell
Preceded by James C. Mitchell	Member of the U.S. House of Representatives from Tennessee's 3rd congressional district 1829-1833	Succeeded by Luke Lea
Preceded by Jacob C. Isacks	Member of the U.S. House of Representatives from Tennessee's 4th congressional district 1833-1837	Succeeded by William Stone
