= Hugh Lawson White Hill =

American politician (1810–1892)

Member of the U.S. House of Representatives from Tennessee's 4th district
- In office March 4, 1847 – March 3, 1849
- Preceded by: Alvan Cullom
- Succeeded by: John H. Savage

Member of the Tennessee House of Representatives
- In office 1837–1839; 1841

Personal details
- Born: March 1, 1810 McMinnville, Tennessee, U.S.
- Died: January 18, 1892 (aged 81) Hills Creek Warren County, Tennessee, U.S.
- Party: Democratic
- Spouse: Virginia Dearing Hill
- Education: Cumberland College
- Profession: teacher; farmer; politician

Hugh Lawson White Hill (March 1, 1810 – January 18, 1892) was an American politician and a member of the United States House of Representatives for Tennessee's 4th congressional district.

== Biography ==
Hill was born on March 1, 1810, in McMinnville, Tennessee, in Warren County a son of Henry John A. and Susannah Swales Hill. After attending public school and Carroll Male Academy at McMinnville, he graduated from Cumberland College in Nashville. He taught school for a short time and engaged in agricultural pursuits and fruit growing. He married Virginia Dearing on May 14, 1840, and they had eight children.

== Career ==
Hill was a member of the Tennessee House of Representatives from 1837 to 1839 and in 1841. He was elected as a Democrat to the Thirtieth Congress. He served from March 4, 1847, to March 3, 1849. He was not a candidate for renomination in 1848.

Hill resumed agricultural pursuits and was a member of the state constitutional convention in 1870.

== Death ==
Hill died at Hills Creek in Warren County, Tennessee, on January 18, 1892, and was interred in Hill Graveyard near McMinnville, Tennessee. He was a cousin of fellow congressman Benjamin Harvey Hill.

U.S. House of Representatives
Preceded by Alvan Cullom	Member of the U.S. House of Representatives from Tennessee's 4th congressional district 1847-1849	Succeeded by John H. Savage
