= Pryor Lea =

American politician

Member of the U.S. House of Representatives from Tennessee's 2nd district
- In office March 4, 1827 – March 4, 1831
- Preceded by: John Alexander Cocke
- Succeeded by: Thomas Dickens Arnold

United States Attorney for the Eastern District of Tennessee
- In office 1821–1828
- Preceded by: John McCampbell
- Succeeded by: John A. McKinney

Personal details
- Born: August 31, 1794 Grainger County, Tennessee
- Died: September 14, 1879 (aged 85) Goliad, Texas
- Party: Jacksonian
- Spouse(s): Maria Kennedy Lea; Minerva Heard Lea; Mary Perkins Lea
- Relations: Luke Lea (uncle); Albert Lea (brother); Edward Lea (nephew)
- Children: Abraham, Julia, Centhia, James
- Education: Tusculum College
- Profession: Attorney, railroad entrepreneur

Pryor Lea (August 31, 1794 – September 14, 1879) was an American politician and railroad entrepreneur who represented Tennessee's 2nd district in the United States House of Representatives from 1827 to 1831. He moved to Goliad, Texas, in the 1840s, where he engaged in railroad construction, and served in the Texas Senate. He was a delegate to the 1861 Texas convention that adopted the state's Ordinance of Secession on the eve of the Civil War. Luke Lea and Albert M. Lea were his brothers.

== Early life ==
Lea was born in what is now Grainger County, Tennessee, but was then part of Knox County, the son of Major Lea and Lavinia (Jarnagin) Lea. He attended the former Greeneville College (now Tusculum College), after which he studied law. He fought in the Creek War as a major under Andrew Jackson in 1813, and clerked for the Tennessee House of Representatives in 1816. He was admitted to the bar in 1817, and began practicing in Knoxville. He owned slaves. He married Maria Kennedy on October 6, 1818. They had four children, Abraham, Julia, Centhia, and James Kennedy. His second marriage was to Minerva Heard, and his third was to Mary Perkins.

Lea was appointed to the Board of Trustees of East Tennessee College (the forerunner of the University of Tennessee) in 1821, and later served as the board's secretary. That same year, he was appointed United States Attorney for Eastern Tennessee.

== Congress ==
A supporter of Andrew Jackson, Lea was elected to the U.S. House of Representatives in 1827, defeating fiery anti-Jacksonite Thomas D. Arnold by a vote of 3,688 to 3,316. He again defeated Arnold in a hotly contested election in 1829, winning 4,713 votes to Arnold's 4,496. Arnold charged Lea with voter fraud, but the House Committee on Elections found no evidence of irregularities, and Lea was allowed to take his seat. He served in the Twentieth and Twenty-first congresses, from March 4, 1827, to March 4, 1831. He was narrowly defeated by Arnold for a third term in 1831, 4,935 votes to 4,702.

As a congressman, Lea was a strict constructionist and states' rights advocate. He generally opposed federal funding for internal improvements, most notably voting against the 1830 "Hemphill Bill," which would have financed the construction of a road connecting Buffalo and New Orleans. He voted in favor of the Indian Removal Act of 1830, describing the House debate on the bill as "one of the severest struggles that I have ever witnessed in Congress." He frequently clashed with fellow Tennessee congressman Davy Crockett, with Crockett calling Lea a "poltroon, a scoundrel, and a puppy," and warning they would fight if they ever crossed paths.

In 1830 he gave a speech on a bill to construct a "National Road" from Buffalo, New York to New Orleans.

== Later life ==
During the mid-1830s, Lea developed an interest in railroad construction, which many East Tennesseans viewed as a solution to the region's isolation. He was secretary of an 1836 Knoxville convention that mapped out the proposed Louisville, Cincinnati and Charleston Railroad. This proposed railroad was doomed by the Panic of 1837, however.

Lea moved to Jackson, Mississippi, in 1836. He then moved to Goliad, Texas, in 1846, to promote railroad construction. He worked with the Aransas Railroad Company, which sought to build a line from the Aransas Bay area to Goliad, and eventually from Goliad to San Antonio (his brother, Albert Miller Lea, was chief engineer of the company). In 1866, the company reincorporated as the Central Transit Company, re-mapping its line from Goliad to Galveston as part of a larger transcontinental effort. Though vigorously promoted by Lea, the company's plans never materialized.

Lea was a founding trustee of the University of Mississippi.

Both Albert and Pryor Lea supported the Knights of the Golden Circle, a secret society which planned to invade Mexico and Central America and establish a massive slave empire around the Gulf of Mexico. They pitched the society's plan to Governor Sam Houston in 1860, but Houston rejected the plan, and ordered the Texas Rangers to break up the Knights' assemblies.

Lea was a delegate to the Texas Secession Convention, which met in Austin in January 1861 to adopt an Ordinance of Secession, leading to eventual Texas membership in the Confederacy. He was elected to the Texas Senate later that year, serving a single term. During the war, he worked with Goliad Aid Association, which provided relief to indigent families, and served as a commissioner with the Aransas Salt Works.

In 1866, Governor James W. Throckmorton appointed Lea state superintendent of public instruction, though he was later removed for opposing Reconstruction. Goliad County elected Lea their delegate to the state's 1875 Constitutional Convention, but he declined due to his "extreme age." He died on September 14, 1879 (age 85 years, 14 days), and is interred at Oak Hill Cemetery in Goliad.

U.S. House of Representatives
Preceded by John Alexander Cocke	Member of the U.S. House of Representatives from Tennessee's 2nd congressional district 1827–1831	Succeeded by Thomas Dickens Arnold
Texas Senate
Preceded by Forbes Britton	Texas State Senator from District 29 (Goliad); 1861–1865	Succeeded by John T. Littleton
