= Samuel E. Hogg =

American politician (1783–1842)

Member of the U.S. House of Representatives from Tennessee's 4th district
- In office March 4, 1817 – March 3, 1819
- Preceded by: Bennett H. Henderson
- Succeeded by: Robert Allen

Personal details
- Born: April 18, 1783 Halifax, North Carolina
- Died: May 28, 1842 (aged 59) Rutherford County, Tennessee
- Party: Democratic-Republican
- Spouse: Mary Talbot Hogg
- Profession: teacher; physician; politician

Samuel E. Hogg (April 18, 1783 – May 28, 1842) was an American politician and a member of the United States House of Representatives who represented Tennessee from 1817 to 1819.

== Biography ==
Hogg was born in Halifax, North Carolina son of Thomas and Rebecca Edwards Hogg. His uncle, Samuel Hogg, for whom he was named, became his guardian after his father's death. He attended public schools in Caswell County and taught for a while before studying medicine in Gallatin, Tennessee around 1804.

== Career ==
Hogg subsequently moved to Lebanon County, Tennessee and joined the army as a surgeon. He served in the First Regiment of Tennessee Volunteer Infantry from November 21, 1812 to April 22, 1813. He was on the staff of Major General Andrew Jackson in the expedition against the Creek Indians from February 22 to May 25, 1814. He also served on the staff of Major General William Carroll from November 13, 1814 to May 13, 1815.

He served in the Tennessee House of Representatives. He was elected as a Democratic-Republican to the Fifteenth Congress, which lasted from March 4, 1817 to March 3, 1819.

Hogg went back into practicing medicine in Lebanon, Tennessee until 1828. He then practiced in Nashville from 1828 to 1836, and in Natchez from 1836 to 1838. He returned and again practiced in Nashville from 1838 to 1840. He was president of the State Medical Society of Tennessee in 1840.

== Death ==
Hogg died in Rutherford County, Tennessee on May 28, 1842 (age 59 years, 40 days), and is interred at the Nashville City Cemetery.

U.S. House of Representatives
Preceded by Bennett H. Henderson	Member of the U.S. House of Representatives from Tennessee's 4th congressional district 1817-1819	Succeeded by Robert Allen
