= Isaac Thomas =

American politician

Member of the U.S. House of Representatives from Tennessee's 3rd district
- In office March 4, 1815 – March 3, 1817
- Preceded by: Thomas K. Harris
- Succeeded by: Francis Jones

Personal details
- Born: November 4, 1784 Sevierville, Tennessee
- Died: February 2, 1859 (aged 74) Alexandria, Louisiana
- Party: Democratic-Republican
- Spouses: Jane Bullard Thomas; Emmeline Flint Thomas

Issac Thomas (November 4, 1784 – February 2, 1859), was an American politician representing Tennessee in the United States House of Representatives.

== Biography ==
Thomas was born in Sevierville, Tennessee. After the death of his parents, Thomas moved to Winchester, Tennessee in 1800. He was self-educated, and he studied law. His first wife was Jane Bullard who died in 1833. He then married Emmeline Flint, with whose family he was in business.

== Career ==
Admitted to bar in 1808, Thomas practiced in Winchester. He served as brigadier general of the Louisiana Militia during the War of 1812.

Thomas was elected as a Democratic-Republican to the Fourteenth Congress, which lasted from March 4, 1815, to March 3, 1817.

Thomas moved to Alexandria, Louisiana in 1819 and resumed the practice of law. He purchased vast tracts of land adjoining Alexandria and became one of the largest landowners and slaveholders in Louisiana. He was the first man to introduce the cultivation of sugarcane in central Louisiana. While running a plantation, he engaged in mercantile pursuits and in the operation of sawmills and steamboats. He also served as a member of the Louisiana Senate from 1823 to 1827. He moved to California in 1849.

== Death ==
Thomas returned to Alexandria, Louisiana, where he died on February 2, 1859 (age 74 years, 90 days). He is interred at Flint lot, in Rapides Cemetery, at Pineville, Louisiana.

U.S. House of Representatives
Preceded by Thomas K. Harris	Member of the U.S. House of Representatives from Tennessee's 3rd congressional district 1815-1817	Succeeded by Francis Jones
