= Richland, Tennessee =

Human settlement in Tennessee, US

- Unincorporated community
- Location within Tennessee Location within the United States
- Coordinates: 36.137585°N 83.665457°W
- Country: United States
- State: Tennessee
- County: Grainger
- City: Blaine
- Elevation: 938 ft (286 m)
- Time zone: UTC-5 (Eastern (EST))
  - Summer (DST): UTC-4 (EDT)
- ZIP code: 37709
- Area code: 865
- GNIS feature ID: 1314273

Richland is an unincorporated community in southwestern Grainger County, in the U.S. state of Tennessee. It is located partially inside Blaine's city limits and urban growth boundary.

== History ==
A post office called Richland was in operation from 1877 until 1902.

== Notable people ==
- Albert Miller Lea, a surveyor and engineer, was born in Richland.
