= Albert Miller Lea =

American military engineer (1808–1891)

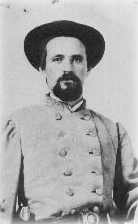
- Lea c. 1861–1865
- Born: July 23, 1808; Richland, Tennessee, U.S.
- Died: January 16, 1891 (aged 82); Corsicana, Texas, U.S.
- Burial place: Oakwood Cemetery; Corsicana, Texas, U.S.
- Education: United States Military Academy (1833–1831); University of Tennessee (1844–1851)
- Children: Edward Lea (son)
- Relatives: Pryor Lea (brother); Luke Lea (brother); Luke Lea (uncle); John McCormick Lea (cousin); Luke Lea (cousin)
- Military career
- Allegiance: United States (1831–1861); Confederate States (1861–1865)
- Branch: United States Army; Iowa Militia; Confederate States Army
- Service years: 1831–1836 (USA); 1840–1861(Militia); 1861–1865 (CSA)
- Rank: Second Lieutenant (USA); Brigadier General (Militia); Lieutenant Colonel (CSA)
- Units: 7th Infantry Regiment (1831–1833); 1st Regiment of Dragoons (1833–1836)
- Known for: Surveyor for Stephen W. Kearny's 1835 expedition
- Conflicts: American Indian Wars; American Civil War

Albert Miller Lea (July 23, 1808 – January 16, 1891) was an American military engineer who surveyed southern Minnesota and northern Iowa in 1835. He also worked as a mathematics professor. Pryor Lea and Luke Lea were his brothers. He wrote an autobiography.

== Biography ==
Lea was born in Richland, Tennessee, a small village not far from Knoxville. He attended the United States Military Academy. He graduated fifth of 33 cadets in the Class of 1831. Due to his high class ranking, he was assigned to the engineers and posted to Fort Des Moines in the Iowa Territory, serving until his resignation in May 1836. In 1837, despite his youth, he became the Chief Engineer for the state of Tennessee. He then worked for the Federal government determining the boundary between Iowa and Missouri. From 1839 to 1840, he was an assistant engineer on the Baltimore and Ohio Railroad. He became a brigadier general in the Iowa militia and then the chief clerk for the U.S. War Department.

In 1844, he earned his master's degree in engineering from East Tennessee University in Knoxville and joined the faculty as an instructor. From 1849 to 1854, was the city engineer for Knoxville, as well as managing a local glass manufacturing company. He moved to East Texas in 1855.

During the American Civil War, Lea was an engineering officer in the Confederate States Army with the rank of major (later, lieutenant colonel). During the Battle of Galveston on New Year's Day 1863, his 25-year-old son, Lt. Commander Edward Lea of the Union Navy, was mortally wounded while serving on the USRC Harriet Lane. Lea himself was among the Confederate officers who boarded the captured ship, and found his son shortly before his death.

After the war, Lea lived in Galveston for several years. He moved in 1874 to Corsicana, Texas, where he purchased a farm. He died of heart failure in 1891 and was buried in Oakwood Cemetery in Corsicana.

== Honors ==
Albert Lea, Minnesota, was named in his honor.
