= Luther Fuller =

American helmsman

Augustus Fuller
- Born: c. 1818
- Died: 1841; On Lake Erie, near Buffalo, New York
- Occupation: helmsman
- Known for: heroic death

Augustus Fuller, also known as Luther Fuller and John Maynard, was the helmsman of the steamboat Erie. He died on August 9, 1841, at 23 years of age, at the wheel of the ship which was destroyed by fire. He was praised for his heroism for remaining at his post.

== Report and first namer ==
On the evening of August 9, 1841, the Buffalo Commercial Advertiser and Journal reported the death of the wheelsman "Luther Fuller", one of many who died during the conflagration of Erie on August 9, 1841. Fuller was at the wheel when the fire broke out at 8:10 pm. He was praised by Capt. T. J. Titus (one of the few survivors) when he testified before the Coroner's Inquest at Buffalo, New York. He stated: "I think Fuller remained at the wheel and never left it until burned to death; he was always a resolute man in obeying orders".

In his testimony, Titus did not specify what Fuller's first name was. When Fuller's body was recovered, the Erie Gazette called him "Luther Fuller" instead of his real name, Augustus Fuller. It was later established that the Buffalo Commercial Advertiser had previously incorrectly written his name.

== John Maynard ==
The anonymous prose sketch entitled The Helmsman of Lake Erie did not appear until four years after the loss of the Erie. Many researchers have stated that the sketch referred to Fuller, probably due to the magnitude of the tragedy, which up to 1841 was the worst steamer conflagration on Lake Erie. Nonetheless, it is claimed the helmsman in the sketch is not Fuller, but "Old John Maynard".

== 19th century cultural references ==
The 1845 sketch first appeared on July 19 in the Poughkeepsie Journal & Eagle. The August 30, 1845, issue of the Baltimore Sun led to the creation of a ballad by Benjamin Brown French, submitted to the same newspaper and printed on September 5 of that year. A reworked and shortened prose sketch from 1860 was the subject of numerous temperance lectures by John Bartholomew Gough. Horatio Alger Jr., inspired by Gough's sketch, composed his own popular ballad in the summer of 1866 titled "John Maynard, A Ballad of Lake Erie". Already in November 1863, The British Workman (London, England) put out an untitled "John Maynard" ballad by the anonymous poet "Josephine", which accompanied the shortened sketch by J. B. Gough. Epes Sargent continued the "Maynard" tradition with his own "Helmsman of Lake Erie", composed c. 1873.

In Germany, the first Lake Erie ballad was published in 1871 by Emil Rittershaus in the popular Gartenlaube, to which he regularly contributed. The ballad's name was "Ein deutsches Herz" ("A German Heart"). Although not a "John Maynard" ballad, Rittershaus created a moving depiction of the problems of German immigration to the United States and emigration from the United States to Germany. Encouraged by Rittershaus, other poets composed their own Lake Erie ballads in the tradition of "John Maynard": Ada Linden (Luise Förster) around 1882, and Theodor Fontane in 1886. The steamer's name in Rittershaus's, Linden's and Fontane's ballads is the "Schwalbe" (in German "Swallow"). Fontane's "John Maynard" was hugely popular and still is compulsory reading in German classes and thus the City of Buffalo was urged by enthusiastic German tourists to install a commemorative plate (explaining the legend and the man) at the lake in 1998.
