= William M. Churchwell =

American politician (1826–1862)

William Montgomery Churchwell
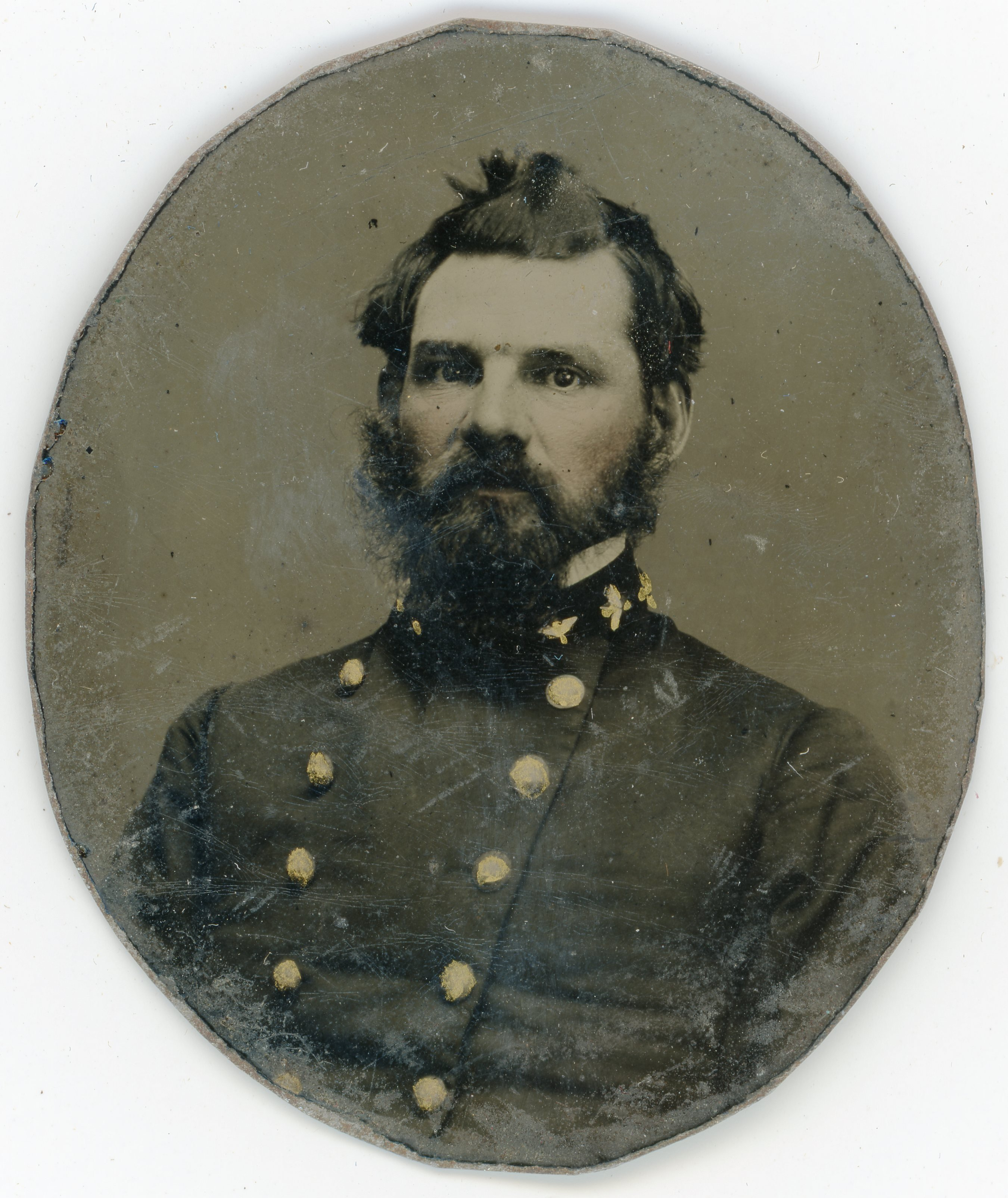

Member of the U.S. House of Representatives from Tennessee
- In office March 4, 1851 – March 3, 1855
- Preceded by: Josiah M. Anderson (3rd); Albert G. Watkins (2nd)
- Succeeded by: Samuel A. Smith (3rd); William H. Sneed (2nd)
- Constituency: 3rd district (1851-53); 2nd district (1853-55)

Personal details
- Born: February 20, 1826 Knox County, Tennessee, U.S.
- Died: August 18, 1862 (aged 36) Knoxville, Tennessee, U.S.
- Party: Democratic
- Spouse: Martha Eleanor Deery Churchwell
- Education: Emory and Henry College, Virginia
- Profession: lawyer, politician, judge, ambassador

Military service
- Allegiance: Confederate States
- Branch/service: Confederate States Army
- Years of service: 1861–1862
- Rank: Colonel (CSA)
- Commands: 34th Tennessee Infantry
- Battles/wars: American Civil War

William Montgomery Churchwell (February 20, 1826 – August 18, 1862) was an American politician and a member of the United States House of Representatives. He was a member of the Democratic Party, and as of 2025 was the last Democrat to represent the Knoxville area in the U.S. House. He also served as Confederate States Army officer during the American Civil War.

== Biography ==
Churchwell was born near Knoxville, Tennessee in Knox County on February 20, 1826. He attended private schools and Emory and Henry College in Emory, Virginia from 1840 to 1843. He studied law, was admitted to the bar, and commenced practice in Knoxville. He married Martha Eleanor Deery.

== Career ==
Churchwell served as one of the judges for Knox County. He was elected as a Democrat to the Thirty-second Congress by Tennessee's 3rd congressional district, and then by Tennessee's 2nd congressional district to the Thirty-third Congress after Tennessee had lost a district through reapportionment. He served from March 4, 1851 to March 3, 1853 for the 3rd district, and from March 4, 1853 to March 3, 1855 for the 2nd district. As of 2024, he is the most recent Democrat to represent the Tennessee 2nd District. During the Thirty-third Congress, he was the chairman of the United States House Committee on Pensions and Revolutionary War Claims.

Churchwell was later a provost marshal for the district of east Tennessee. During the administration of President Buchanan, he was sent on a secret mission to Mexico. He served in the Confederate states Army as colonel of the 34th Tennessee Infantry Regiment (4th Provisional Tennessee Infantry) during the American Civil War.

== Death ==
Churchwell died in Knoxville, Tennessee on August 18, 1862 (age 36 years, 179 days). He is interred at Old Gray Cemetery.

U.S. House of Representatives
Preceded by Josiah M. Anderson	Member of the U.S. House of Representatives from Tennessee's 3rd congressional district 1851-1853	Succeeded by Samuel Axley Smith
Preceded by Albert G. Watkins	Member of the U.S. House of Representatives from Tennessee's 2nd congressional district 1853-1855	Succeeded by William H. Sneed
Diplomatic posts
Preceded by John Forsyth Jr.	U.S. Minister to Mexico; 1858	Succeeded by Alfred Mordecai
