= Julius W. Blackwell =

American politician

Member of the U.S. House of Representatives from Tennessee's 4th district
- In office March 4, 1839 – March 3, 1841
- Preceded by: William Stone
- Succeeded by: Thomas J. Campbell

Member of the U.S. House of Representatives from Tennessee's 3rd district
- In office March 4, 1843 – March 3, 1845
- Preceded by: Joseph L. Williams
- Succeeded by: John H. Crozier

Personal details
- Born: c. 1797 Virginia, U.S.
- Died: Date and place of death unknown
- Party: Democratic
- Spouse: Mahala D. Blackwell

Julius W. Blackwell (born c. 1797; death date unknown) was an American politician and a member of the United States House of Representatives that represented fourth and third districts of Tennessee in the United States House of Representatives.

== Biography ==
Blackwell was born in Virginia in approximately 1797 and attended the public schools. He moved to Tennessee and settled in Athens, McMinn County. He was a coppersmith by trade. He owned slaves. He married Mahala D.

== Career ==
Blackwell was elected as a Democrat by the fourth district to the Twenty-sixth Congress, which lasted from March 4, 1839, to March 3, 1841. He was an unsuccessful candidate for re-election to the Twenty-seventh Congress in 1840.

After the number of electoral districts Tennessee held had been reduced and reapportioned, he was elected by Tennessee's third district to the Twenty-eighth Congress, which lasted from March 4, 1843, to March 3, 1845. He was an unsuccessful candidate for re-election to the Twenty-ninth Congress in 1844.

== Death ==
The date, and the location of his death is unknown as well as the place of his interment.

U.S. House of Representatives
Preceded by William Stone	Member of the U.S. House of Representatives from Tennessee's 4th congressional district 1839–1841	Succeeded by Thomas J. Campbell
Preceded by Joseph L. Williams	Member of the U.S. House of Representatives from Tennessee's 3rd congressional district 1843–1845	Succeeded by John H. Crozier
