= Luke Lea (American politician, born 1783) =

American politician (1783–1851)

Secretary of State of Tennessee
- In office 1837–1839
- Governor: Newton Cannon
- Preceded by: Samuel G. Smith
- Succeeded by: John S. Young

Member of the U.S. House of Representatives from Tennessee's 3rd district
- In office March 4, 1833 – March 3, 1837
- Preceded by: James I. Standifer
- Succeeded by: Joseph L. Williams

Personal details
- Born: January 21, 1783 Surry County, North Carolina, US
- Died: June 17, 1851 (aged 68) Fort Leavenworth, Kansas, US
- Party: Jacksonian Democrat; Whig; Anti-Jacksonian
- Spouse: Susan Wells McCormick Lea
- Children: James Armstrong Lea; John McCormick Lea; Francis Wells Lea; William Park Lea; Ann R. Lea; Susan Jane Lea; Lavinia Lea; Margaret Lea; Luke Lea, Jr.

Luke Lea (January 21, 1783 – June 17, 1851) was a two-term United States representative from Tennessee.

== Biography ==
Lea was born in Surry County, North Carolina, the son of the Reverend Luke and Elisabeth Wilson Lea. He moved with his parents in 1790 into what would become Hawkins County, Tennessee. He attended the common school, and as a young man he was a clerk for the Tennessee House of Representatives from 1804 to 1806. He married Susan Wells McCormick on February 28, 1816, and they had nine children. He was also the great-grandfather of Luke Lea, founder of the Nashville Tennessean newspaper and a U.S. Senator from Tennessee from 1911 to 1917. He owned slaves.

== Career ==
After commanding a regiment under General Andrew Jackson in the Seminole and Creek War of 1818, Lee then moved to Campbells Station, Knox County, Tennessee. He was elected as a Jacksonian to the 23rd Congress and re-elected as an Anti-Jacksonian to the 24th Congress. He served from March 4, 1833, to March 3, 1837.

He changed parties for his second term from Jacksonian to National Republican. He then served as Tennessee Secretary of State from 1837 to 1839.

On September 9, 1850, Lea was appointed Indian agent by President Millard Fillmore for Fort Leavenworth, Kansas, and served in that capacity some sources say until his death the following year. Other sources show he continued to live in the District of Columbia and later returned to Mississippi and died in Vicksburg in 1898.

== Death ==
Thrown from his horse on his way back to his residence near Fort Leavenworth, Lea died on June 17, 1851, at age 68. He was first interred at Westport Cemetery, Kansas City, Missouri; and is finally interred at Union Cemetery, Kansas City.

Lea was the brother of Pryor Lea, a two-term Tennessee Congressman (1827–31), who was later a Texas state senator and a prominent Confederate supporter in Texas.

U.S. House of Representatives
Preceded by James I. Standifer	Member of the U.S. House of Representatives from Tennessee's 3rd congressional district 1833–1837	Succeeded by Joseph L. Williams
Political offices
Preceded by Samuel G. Smith	Secretary of State of Tennessee; 1835–1839	Succeeded by John S. Young
