= The Field of Blood: Violence in Congress and the Road to Civil War =

Book by Joanne B. Freeman

- Author: Joanne B. Freeman
- Subject: American history
- Genre: Non-fiction

The Field of Blood: Violence in Congress and the Road to Civil War is a book by Joanne B. Freeman about the role conflict in the United States Congress took in the leadup to the American Civil War. It came out in 2018.

Much of the book is based on the diaries of Benjamin Brown French of New Hampshire, a former Jacksonian democrat turned anti-slavery Lincoln Republican.

Chris Hayes called it "One of the best history books I've read in the last few years."
