= Fields of Blood =

2014 book by Karen Armstrong

- First edition
- Author: Karen Armstrong
- Language: English
- Genre: Non-fiction
- Publisher: Knopf
- Publication date: 2014

Fields of Blood: Religion and the History of Violence is a 2014 book written by Karen Armstrong, published by Knopf.

== Background ==
Armstrong argues in the book that religion is not the primary driving force of war and violence. Instead she argues that the driving force is the creation and maintenance of state power. Armstrong's work has been dedicated in part to challenging the New Atheist movement. The book includes detailed histories of religion and its relation to violence all over the world including China, India, the United States, and Palestine. The book was also published as an audiobook.

== Reception ==
The Publishers Weekly review called the book "Provocative and supremely readable." Lisa Youngblood reviewed the audiobook version at Library Journal saying some of the content is "hard to follow without ... prior knowledge." Kirkus Reviews reviewed the book saying that "her writing is clear and descriptive, her approach balanced and scholarly." Dean Haigh wrote in the Press and Journal that the book was "Well researched, insightful and revelatory" Marcus Tanner wrote in The Independent that "This is a long, detailed book that tries to cover too much territory." Ray Olson wrote in Booklist that "Armstrong again impresses with the breadth of her knowledge and the skill with which she conveys it to us."
