= Joanne B. Freeman =

American historian (born 1962)

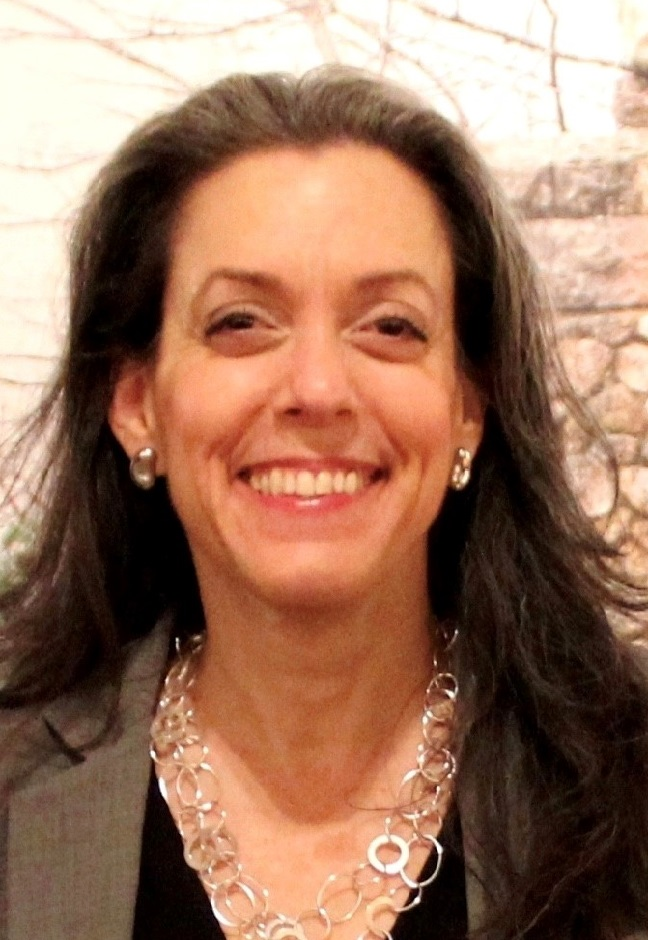
- Born: Joanne B. Freeman; April 27, 1962 (age 64); New York City, U.S.
- Education: Pomona College (BA); University of Virginia (MA, PhD)
- Occupations: professor, author, historian
- Employer: Yale University
- Known for: studies on the American Revolution and the early U.S.
- Awards: Best Book Award, 2001 Society for Historians of the Early American Republic (SHEAR); William Clyde DeVane Teaching Award, Yale University, 2017

Joanne B. Freeman (born April 27, 1962) is an American academic and tenured professor of both U.S. history and American studies at Yale University. She has published multiple books, articles, and op-eds in newspapers including The New York Times and in magazines such as The Atlantic and Slate. In 2005 she was rated one of the "Top Young Historians" in the U.S.

== Early life and education ==
Freeman was born in Queens, New York City, in 1962. She graduated from Pomona College in 1984 and received both her M.A. (1993) and Ph.D. (1998) degrees in American history from the University of Virginia; her doctoral advisor was Peter S. Onuf, a major scholar of Thomas Jefferson. Prior to graduate school, Freeman was a public historian, delivering lectures at a range of U.S. history-centric institutions including the Smithsonian, South Street Seaport, Museum of American Finance, and the Library of Congress over a span of seven years. Her area of expertise is political culture of early America, particularly the revolutionary and early national eras.

== Career ==
In addition to editing Alexander Hamilton: Writings for the Library of America in 2001, Freeman is the author of Affairs of Honor: National Politics in the New Republic (2001). Her first book, Affairs of Honor, received praise for being "analytically incisive" from Stanford University historian and Pulitzer Prize winner Jack Rakove and "enormously original" from Rutgers University history Professor and Thomas Jefferson scholar Jan Lewis. In this debut work, Freeman lays out the challenges that early patriots faced as they struggled to create a new and independent country. Freeman posits that office-holders and office-seekers were particularly immersed in conflict: "Regional distrust, personal animosity, accusation, suspicion, implication, and denouncement—this was the tenor of national politics from the outset.”

A prominent focus of her research has been the practice of dueling, including those rules governing one of the most famous encounters in history between Alexander Hamilton and Aaron Burr. In an interview with fellow historians Kenneth T. Jackson and Valerie Paley, Hamilton author Ron Chernow called attention to Freeman's work and her discovery that Hamilton had been involved in ten previous character challenges prior to the eleventh and fatal event.

Freeman's series of lectures on the American Revolution is one of 42 courses offered online by Open Yale Courses.

Freeman has been interviewed for several documentaries about Hamilton. These have aired on American Experience (PBS) and The Discovery Channel. In 2002, she appeared in Founding Brothers with fellow historians Ron Chernow, Richard Brookhiser, David McCullough, and Carol Berkin on The History Channel; the two-part program and overview of five founders – George Washington, Hamilton, John Adams, Benjamin Franklin and Thomas Jefferson – was based on the Pulitzer Prize winning 2000 book of the same title by Joseph Ellis.

Freeman's published findings about the history of dueling helped inspire the song "Ten Duel Commandments" in the Tony Award winning 2015 musical Hamilton by Lin-Manuel Miranda. Though she agrees with fellow historians that the show has historical errors, she is a fan of the Broadway hit and its creator and believes it is engendering interest in the Founding Fathers. Freeman has also appeared in the 2017 PBS documentary Hamilton's America that traced the making of the musical.

== Recent work ==
Freeman worked for two years as a historical consultant for the National Park Service in the reconstruction of the Hamilton Grange National Memorial. In 2017, she edited and published The Essential Hamilton: Letters & Other Writings, with the Library of America. Her latest book, The Field of Blood: Violence in Congress and the Road to Civil War, documents and analyzes episodes of physical violence between antagonistic members of U.S. Congress in the decades before the Civil War; it was published September 11, 2018, by Farrar, Straus & Giroux.

Starting February 3, 2017, Freeman joined the crew of the popular weekly American History radio show BackStory as a co-host; the show, which was based out of the University of Virginia, was also a popular podcast. The premise of the one hour program was to examine contemporary happenings through the lens of the past. BackStory wrapped production in July 2020.

In April 2020, in response to the COVID-19 pandemic and subsequent pivot from in-person to online learning, Freeman began a collaboration with the National Council for History Education (NCHE) hosting a weekly live webcast, "History Matters and So Does Coffee" (HMASDC). The webcast proved so popular that it continued to run via NCHE sponsorship from April 2020 until December 2025. In January 2026, HMASDC moved to Freeman's YouTube channel to reach a broader audience.

Freeman co-hosted the podcast Now & Then with fellow historian Heather Cox Richardson, from 2021 through the end of the show's production in October 2023. Episodes can still be heard on Spotify.

== Awards ==
- (2001) Best Book Award, Society for Historians of the Early American Republic
- (2017) William Clyde DeVane Teaching Award

== Fellowships ==
- American Council of Learned Societies
- Cullman Center for Scholars and Writers
- Dirkson Congressional Research Center
- J. Franklin Jameson Fellowship Award – Sponsored by the American Historical Association and the Library of Congress (2000–2001)

== Publications ==
=== Books ===
- Affairs of Honor: National Politics in the New Republic. New Haven, CT: Yale University Press, 2001; pbk, 2002. ISBN 9780300097559 OCLC 44391893
- Alexander Hamilton: Writings. New York: Library of America, 2001. ISBN 9781931082044
- The Essential Hamilton – Letters and Other Writings. New York: Library of America, May 2017 (pbk). ISBN 9781598535365
- The Field of Blood: Violence in Congress and the Road to Civil War. New York: Farrar, Straus & Giroux, 2018. ISBN 9781250234582, OCLC 1076509946
- Jeffersonians in Power: The Rhetoric of Opposition Meets the Realities of Governing. Charlottesville: London University of Virginia Press, 2019. ISBN 9780813943053 (with Johann N Neem)

=== Articles and essays ===
- "Slander, Poison, Whispers, and Fame: Jefferson and Political Combat in the Early Republic," Journal of the Early Republic, Spring 1995
- "Dueling as Politics: Reinterpreting the Burr-Hamilton Duel," The William and Mary Quarterly, 3d series, 53 (April 1996): 289–318.
- "The Election of 1800: A Study in the Logic of Political Change," Yale Law Journal, June 1999
- "The Art and Address of Ministerial Management: Secretary of the Treasury Alexander Hamilton and Congress", in Neither Separate Nor Equal: Congress and the Executive Branch in the 1790s, ed. Kenneth Bowling (Ohio University Press, 2000)
- "History as Told by the Devil Incarnate: Gore Vidal's Burr", in Novel History: History According to the Novelists, ed. Mark Carnes (Simon & Schuster, 2001)
- "Corruption and Compromise in the Election of 1800: A Study in the Logic of Political Change", in The Revolution of 1800: Democracy, Race, and the New Republic, ed. Peter S. Onuf and Jan Lewis (University Press of Virginia, September 2002).
- "Explaining the Unexplainable: Reinterpreting the Sedition Act", in The Democratic Experiment: New Directions in American Political History, ed. Julian Zelizer, Meg Jacobs, and William Novak (Princeton University Press, 2003)
- "How Hamilton Uses History: What Lin-Manuel Miranda Included in His Portrait of a Heroic, Complicated Founding Father—and What He Left Out". Slate. November 11, 2015.
- "The Long History of Political Idiocy". The New York Times. August 4, 2015.
- "Understanding the Burr-Hamilton Duel". History Now – The Journal of the Gilder Lehrman Institute. 2016.
- "Louisa: The Extraordinary Life of Mrs. Adams by Louis Thomas". The New York Times. April 4, 2016.
- "'Can We Get Back to Politics, Please?': Hamilton's Missing Politics in 'Hamilton'." In Renee C. Romano and Claire Bond Potter, eds., Historians on Hamilton: How a Blockbuster Musical is Restaging America's Past. New Brunswick, NJ: Rutgers University Press, 2018.

=== Additional publications ===
- Journal of Policy History

== Sources ==
- Kenneth T. Jackson and Virginia Paley. "History Makers: A Conversation, An Interview with Ron Chernow" (PDF). New-York Historical Society.
- Christopher Caldwell (January 13, 2002). "Liar, Scoundrel, Puppy". New York Times.
- Andrew S. Trees,The Founding Fathers and the Politics of Character, Princeton University Press, 2004.
- "Two faculty members and a Yale alumna win awards from Phi Beta Kappa". Yale. February 20, 2017.
- Jennifer Schuessler (January 9, 2017). "Up From the Family Basement, a Little-Seen Hamilton Trove". The New York Times.
- "Alumna's Research Guided Fiery Lyrics and Duels of Broadway Hit 'Hamilton". University of Virginia. Archived from the original on April 10, 2017.
- Bridget Rne (May 27, 2002). "Series reveals the nation's 'Founding Brothers' in conflict". Associated Press.
