= Mississippi's at-large congressional district =

Coordinates: 32.783745°N 89.611309°W

- Obsolete district
- Created: 1817; 1850
- Eliminated: 1847; 1855
- Years active: 1817-1843; 1853-1855

The U.S. state of Mississippi's at-large congressional district existed from December 10, 1817, when it was admitted to the Union until 1847, when representatives were elected in districts.

Mississippi briefly elected an at-large representative from 1853 to 1855, in addition to having the rest of the delegation elected from districts.

== List of representatives ==
=== 1817–1855: one seat, then two, then four, then none, then one ===
| Cong ress | Years | Seat A | | | Seat B | | | Seat C | | | Seat D | | |
| Cong ress | Years | Representative | Party | Electoral history | Representative | Party | Electoral history | Representative | Party | Electoral history | Representative | Party | Electoral history |
|---|---|---|---|---|---|---|---|---|---|---|---|---|---|
| 15th | December 10, 1817 | District created | | | | | | | | | | | |
| 15th | December 10, 1817 – March 3, 1819 | George Poindexter (Woodville) | Democratic-Republican | Elected in 1817. Retired. | No 2nd seat | | | No 3rd seat | | | No 4th seat | | |
| 16th | March 4, 1819 – March 3, 1821 | Christopher Rankin (Natchez) | Democratic-Republican (Note: Supported the Jackson faction in the 1824 United States presidential election.) | Elected in 1819. Re-elected in 1820. Re-elected in 1822. Re-elected in 1824. Died. | No 2nd seat | | | No 3rd seat | | | No 4th seat | | |
| 17th | March 4, 1821 – March 3, 1823 | Christopher Rankin (Natchez) | Democratic-Republican | Elected in 1819. Re-elected in 1820. Re-elected in 1822. Re-elected in 1824. Died. | No 2nd seat | | | No 3rd seat | | | No 4th seat | | |
| 18th | March 4, 1823 – March 3, 1825 | Christopher Rankin (Natchez) | Democratic-Republican | Elected in 1819. Re-elected in 1820. Re-elected in 1822. Re-elected in 1824. Died. | No 2nd seat | | | No 3rd seat | | | No 4th seat | | |
| 19th | March 4, 1825 – March 14, 1826 | Christopher Rankin (Natchez) | Jacksonian | Elected in 1819. Re-elected in 1820. Re-elected in 1822. Re-elected in 1824. Died. | No 2nd seat | | | No 3rd seat | | | No 4th seat | | |
| 19th | March 14, 1826 – July 10, 1826 | Vacant | | | No 2nd seat | | | No 3rd seat | | | No 4th seat | | |
| 19th | July 10, 1826 – March 3, 1827 | William Haile (Woodville) | Jacksonian | Elected July 11, 1826 to finish Rankin's term and seated December 4, 1826. Re-elected later in 1826. Resigned. | No 2nd seat | | | No 3rd seat | | | No 4th seat | | |
| 20th | March 4, 1827 – July 10, 1828 | William Haile (Woodville) | Jacksonian | Elected July 11, 1826 to finish Rankin's term and seated December 4, 1826. Re-elected later in 1826. Resigned. | No 2nd seat | | | No 3rd seat | | | No 4th seat | | |
| 20th | July 10, 1828 – October 21, 1828 | Vacant | | | No 2nd seat | | | No 3rd seat | | | No 4th seat | | |
| 20th | October 21, 1828 – March 3, 1829 | Thomas Hinds (Greenville) | Jacksonian | Elected October 20, 1828 to finish Haile's term and seated December 8, 1828. Elected August 4–5, 1828 to the next term. Retired. | No 2nd seat | | | No 3rd seat | | | No 4th seat | | |
| 21st | March 3, 1829 – March 3, 1831 | Thomas Hinds (Greenville) | Jacksonian | Elected October 20, 1828 to finish Haile's term and seated December 8, 1828. Elected August 4–5, 1828 to the next term. Retired. | No 2nd seat | | | No 3rd seat | | | No 4th seat | | |
| 22nd | March 4, 1831 – March 3, 1833 | Franklin E. Plummer (Westville) | Jacksonian | Elected in 1830. Re-elected in 1832. Retired to run for U.S. senator. | No 2nd seat | | | No 3rd seat | | | No 4th seat | | |
| 23rd | March 4, 1833 – March 3, 1835 | Franklin E. Plummer (Westville) | Jacksonian | Elected in 1830. Re-elected in 1832. Retired to run for U.S. senator. | Harry Cage (Woodville) | Jacksonian | Elected in 1832. Retired. | No 3rd seat | | | No 4th seat | | |
| 24th | March 4, 1835 – July 31, 1836 | John F. H. Claiborne (Madisonville) | Jacksonian | Elected in 1835. Re-elected in 1837 but election was invalidated. | David Dickson (Jackson) | Anti-Jacksonian | Elected in 1835. Died. | No 3rd seat | | | No 4th seat | | |
| 24th | July 31, 1836 – January 7, 1837 | John F. H. Claiborne (Madisonville) | Jacksonian | Elected in 1835. Re-elected in 1837 but election was invalidated. | Vacant | | | No 3rd seat | | | No 4th seat | | |
| 24th | January 7, 1837 – March 3, 1837 | John F. H. Claiborne (Madisonville) | Jacksonian | Elected in 1835. Re-elected in 1837 but election was invalidated. | Samuel J. Gholson (Athens) | Jacksonian | Elected November 7, 1836 to finish Dickson's term and seated January 7, 1837. Re-elected in 1837 but election was invalidated. | No 3rd seat | | | No 4th seat | | |
| 25th | March 4, 1837 – July 17, 1837 | Vacant | | | Vacant | | | No 3rd seat | | | No 4th seat | | |
| 25th | July 18, 1837 – February 5, 1838 | John F. H. Claiborne (Madisonville) | Democratic | Credentials presented but election successfully contest and seat declared vacant. | Samuel J. Gholson (Athens) | Democratic | Credentials presented but election successfully contest and seat declared vacant. | No 3rd seat | | | No 4th seat | | |
| 25th | February 5, 1838 – May 29, 1838 | Vacant | | | Vacant | | | No 3rd seat | | | No 4th seat | | |
| 25th | May 29, 1838 – March 3, 1839 | Seargent S. Prentiss (Vicksburg) | Whig | Elected to finish Claiborne's term. Retired. | Thomas J. Word (Pontotoc) | Whig | Elected to finish Gholson's term. Retired. | No 3rd seat | | | No 4th seat | | |
| 26th | March 4, 1839 – March 3, 1841 | Jacob Thompson (Oxford) | Democratic | Elected in 1839. Re-elected in 1841. Re-elected in 1843. Re-elected in 1845. Redistricted to the 1st district. | Albert G. Brown (Gallatin) | Democratic | Elected in 1839. Retired. | No 3rd seat | | | No 4th seat | | |
| 27th | March 4, 1841 – March 3, 1843 | Jacob Thompson (Oxford) | Democratic | Elected in 1839. Re-elected in 1841. Re-elected in 1843. Re-elected in 1845. Redistricted to the 1st district. | William M. Gwin (Vicksburg) | Democratic | Elected in 1841. Renominated but declined. | No 3rd seat | | | No 4th seat | | |
| 28th | March 4, 1843 – March 3, 1845 | Jacob Thompson (Oxford) | Democratic | Elected in 1839. Re-elected in 1841. Re-elected in 1843. Re-elected in 1845. Redistricted to the 1st district. | William H. Hammett (Princeton) | Democratic | Elected in 1843. Retired. | Robert W. Roberts (Hillsboro) | Democratic | Elected in 1843. Re-elected in 1845. Redistricted to the 3rd district and lost re-election. | Tilghman Tucker (Columbus) | Democratic | Elected in 1843. Retired. |
| 29th | March 4, 1845 – June 1846 | Jacob Thompson (Oxford) | Democratic | Elected in 1839. Re-elected in 1841. Re-elected in 1843. Re-elected in 1845. Redistricted to the 1st district. | Stephen Adams (Aberdeen) | Democratic | Elected in 1845. Retired. | Robert W. Roberts (Hillsboro) | Democratic | Elected in 1843. Re-elected in 1845. Redistricted to the 3rd district and lost re-election. | Jefferson Davis (Warrenton) | Democratic | Elected in 1845. Resigned to command regiment in Mexican–American War. |
| 29th | June 1846 – January 26, 1847 | Jacob Thompson (Oxford) | Democratic | Elected in 1839. Re-elected in 1841. Re-elected in 1843. Re-elected in 1845. Redistricted to the 1st district. | Stephen Adams (Aberdeen) | Democratic | Elected in 1845. Retired. | Robert W. Roberts (Hillsboro) | Democratic | Elected in 1843. Re-elected in 1845. Redistricted to the 3rd district and lost re-election. | Vacant | | |
| 29th | January 26, 1847 – March 3, 1847 | Jacob Thompson (Oxford) | Democratic | Elected in 1839. Re-elected in 1841. Re-elected in 1843. Re-elected in 1845. Redistricted to the 1st district. | Stephen Adams (Aberdeen) | Democratic | Elected in 1845. Retired. | Robert W. Roberts (Hillsboro) | Democratic | Elected in 1843. Re-elected in 1845. Redistricted to the 3rd district and lost re-election. | Henry T. Ellett (Port Gibson) | Democratic | Elected to finish Davis's term. Retired. |
| 29th | March 4, 1847 – March 3, 1849 | No at-large seats. Starting with the 1847 election, Mississippi elected all its representatives in districts until 1853. | | | | | | | | | | | |
| 31st | March 4, 1849 – March 3, 1851 | No at-large seats. Starting with the 1847 election, Mississippi elected all its representatives in districts until 1853. | | | | | | | | | | | |
| 32nd | March 4, 1851 – March 3, 1853 | No at-large seats. Starting with the 1847 election, Mississippi elected all its representatives in districts until 1853. | | | | | | | | | | | |
| 33rd | March 4, 1853 – March 3, 1855 | William Barksdale (Columbus) | Democratic | Elected in 1853. Redistricted to the 3rd district. | In 1852, one representative was elected at-large, the remainder from districts. | | | | | | | | |
