= Seargent Smith Prentiss =

American politician (1808–1850)

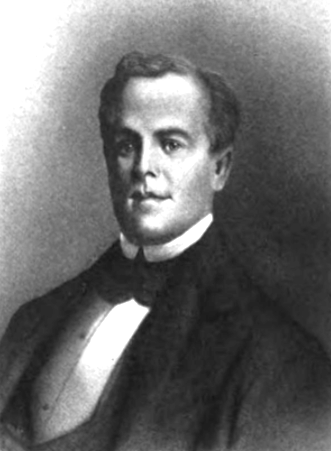

Member of the United States House of Representatives from Mississippi
- In office May 29, 1838 – March 3, 1839
- Preceded by: John F. H. Claiborne
- Succeeded by: Jacob Thompson

Member of the Mississippi House of Representatives
- In office 1835–1836

Personal details
- Born: September 30, 1808 Portland, District of Maine, Massachusetts
- Died: July 1, 1850 (aged 41) Natchez, Mississippi
- Party: Whig
- Education: Bowdoin College
- Occupation: Lawyer, politician

Seargent Smith Prentiss (September 30, 1808 – July 1, 1850) was an American attorney and politician. He served as a state representative in Mississippi and then was elected in 1838 as US representative from the state in the Twenty-fifth United States Congress, serving one term from 1838 to 1839. Prentiss was noted as one of the most remarkable orators of his day. Daniel Webster, known himself as a great orator, said that he had never heard a speaker as powerful as Prentiss.

== Early life ==
Prentiss was born September 30, 1808, in Portland in Massachusetts's District of Maine. He was the son of Captain William Prentiss, a prosperous shipmaster, and his wife. Seargent contracted a virulent fever as an infant, which caused the loss of the use of his limbs for several years. His right leg never fully recovered.

During the War of 1812, the economic embargo against the United Kingdom brought his father to the verge of ruin. The family relocated to Gorham, Maine, near Seargent's maternal grandfather Major George Lewis and his wife.

Prentiss attended Gorham Academy and Bowdoin College in Brunswick. He graduated from Bowdoin at age 17 and began the study of law in the office of Josiah Pierce in Gorham.

== Career ==
After graduating from Bowdoin College in 1826, he went to Natchez, Mississippi as a teacher. He continued to study law and was admitted to the bar in 1829.

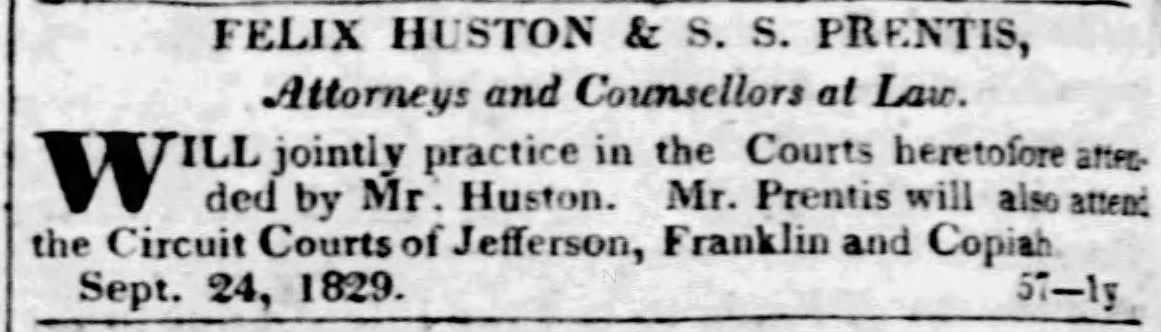
"Felix Huston & S. S. Prentiss" Southern Galaxy, January 28, 1830

In 1832, he moved to Vicksburg, Mississippi and won a suit involving title to the most valuable part of the city. The property which he obtained as his fee made him one of the wealthiest men of Mississippi. He was elected to the State Legislature in 1835 as a Whig. He was a slaveholder.

In July 1837, Democrats John F. H. Claiborne and Samuel J. Gholson were re-elected to the United States House of Representatives in a special election. In November 1837, Mississippi held the regular election. Prentiss launched a vigorous, partisan campaign. He and fellow Whig Thomas J. Word won in an upset. Claiborne and Gholson then argued that the July result entitled them to serve full terms. The House agreed to hear Prentiss. He spoke for nine hours over three days, packing the gallery, drawing Senators, and earning a national reputation for oratory and public admiration from leading Whigs including Senators Clay and Webster. The Elections Committee then required a third election. Held in April 1838, it confirmed the November result. Both Whigs were seated in May late in the second session, also serving for the third session.

Writing about Prentiss's time in Congress, longtime Washington journalist Benjamin Perley Poore said that Prentiss was "the most eloquent speaker that I have ever heard":

The lame and lisping boy from Maine had ripened, under the Southern sun, into a master orator. The original, ever-varying, and beautiful imagery with which he illustrated and enforced his arguments impressed Webster, Clay, Everett, and even John Quincy Adams. But his forte lay in arraigning his political opponents, when his oratory was "terrible as an army with banners;" nothing could stand against the energy of his look, gesture, and impassioned logic, when once he was fairly under way, in denouncing the tricks and selfish cunning of mere party management. The printed reports of his speeches are mere skeletons, which give but a faint idea of them.

He served only one term in Congress. Prentiss later went on the lecture circuit. He reportedly rarely gave speeches from prepared notes and, instead, would ad-lib for hours to large crowds that often begged him for more. After Mississippi repudiated her state bonds, Prentiss, who had opposed this action, moved to New Orleans in 1845. He became a leader of the city's bar, and prominent in philanthropic work.

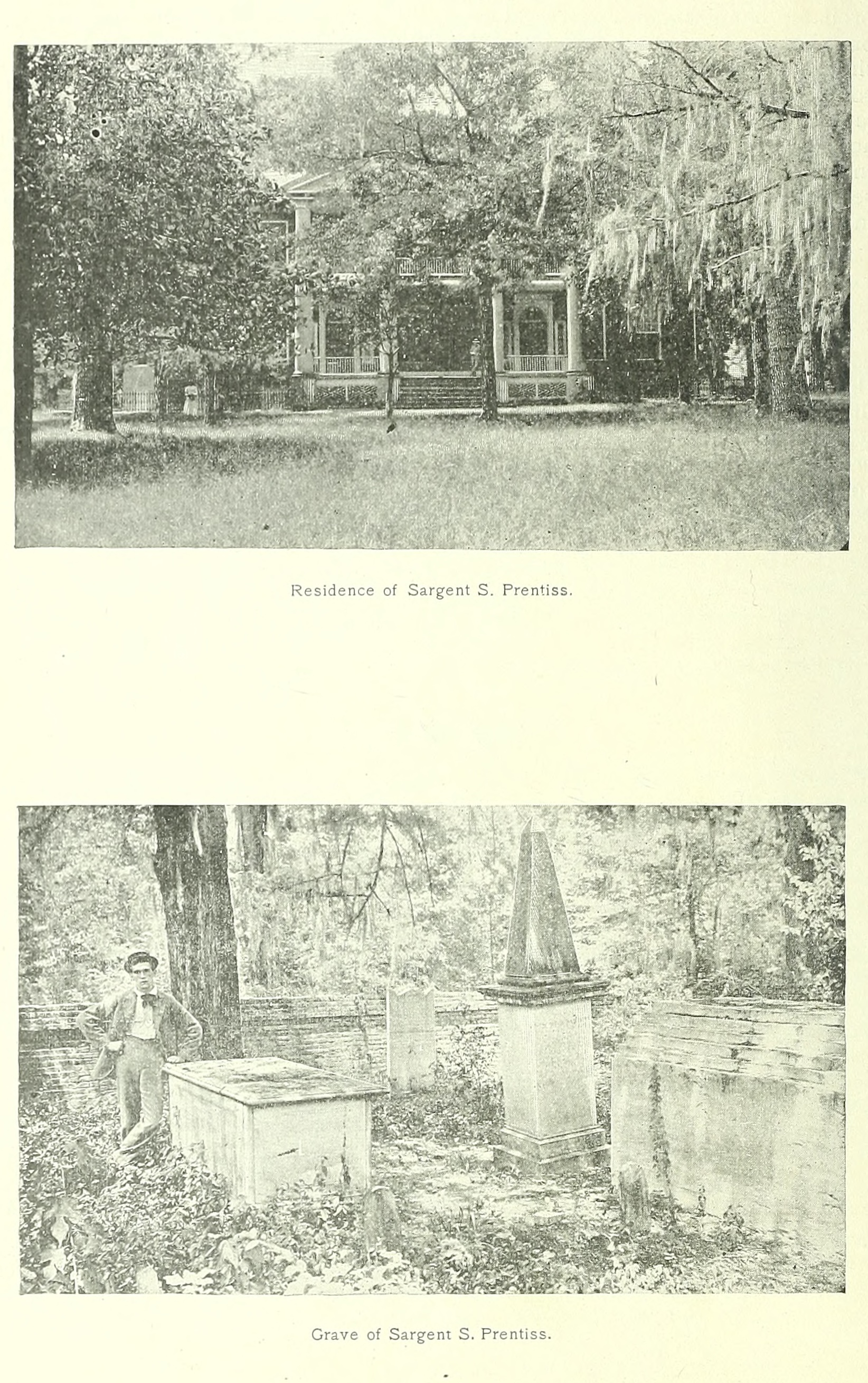
S. S. Prentiss Home and tomb at Gloucester Cemetery in Natchez, Mississippi

Prentiss was publicly embarrassed by his mounting financial troubles. He had made property investments based on disputed land holdings. He was an alcoholic and a gambler. As one history of Vicksburg lawyers put it, "His nights were full of revelry and high conviviality. He drank excessively, lived extravagantly, conversed brilliantly and speculated in real estate. The result was disastrous to his fortunes and he lost all he had accumulated, moved disillusioned to New Orleans and died at forty-two in Natchez in the flaming brilliance of a tragic life."

He died at his mother-in-law's house outside Natchez on July 1, 1850, at age 41. His death shocked the nation. Prentiss had been considered among the most gifted young men in the nation. He is buried at Gloucester Plantation Cemetery in Natchez.

== Honors and awards ==
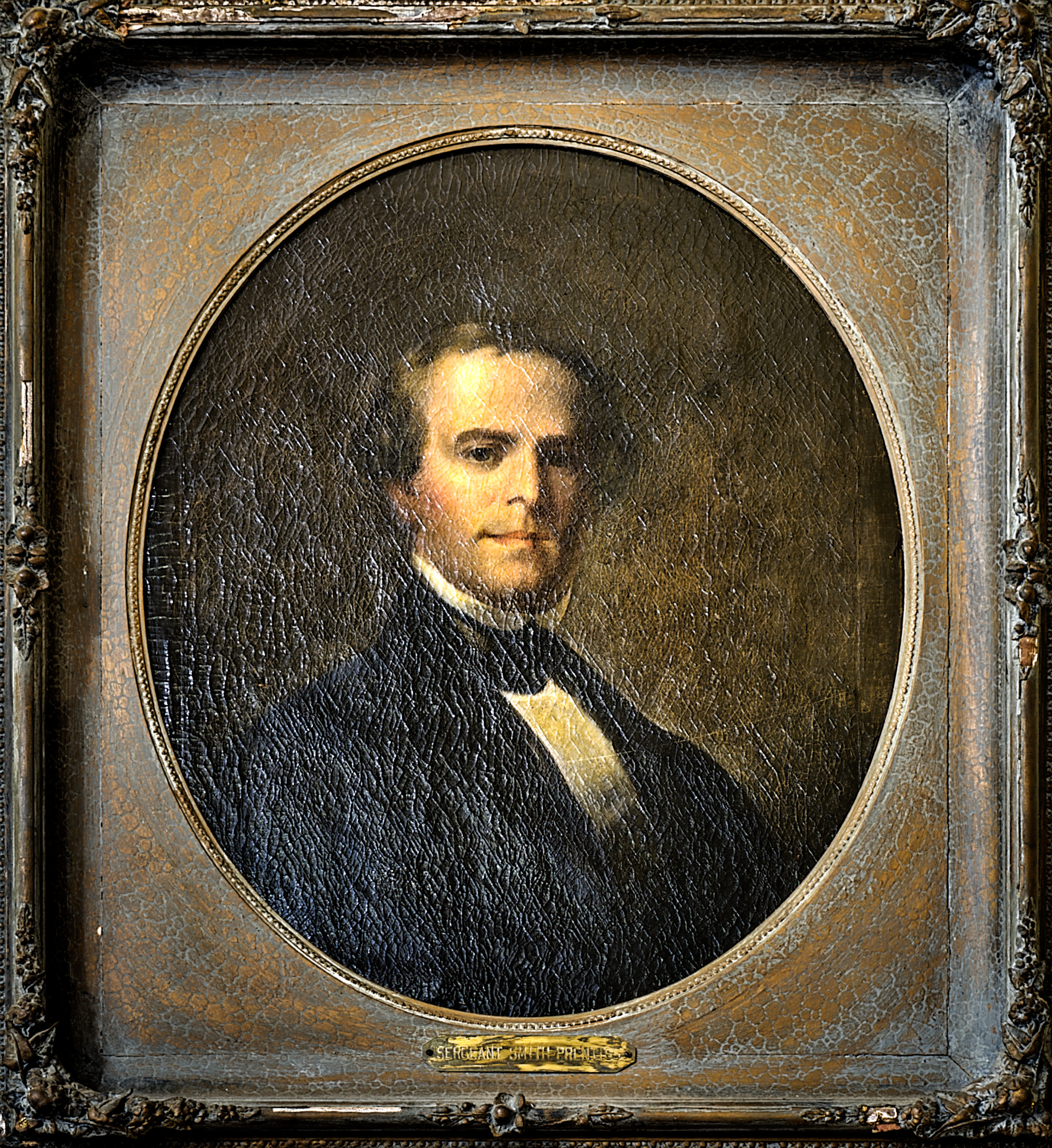
Painting of Prentiss on display at the Old Warren County Courthouse

Prentiss County, Mississippi was named for Seargent Prentiss when it was formed on April 15, 1870.

U.S. House of Representatives
Preceded by John F. H. Claiborne	Member of the U.S. House of Representatives from Mississippi's at-large congressional district May 29, 1838 – March 3, 1839	Succeeded by Jacob Thompson
