= Tamalada =

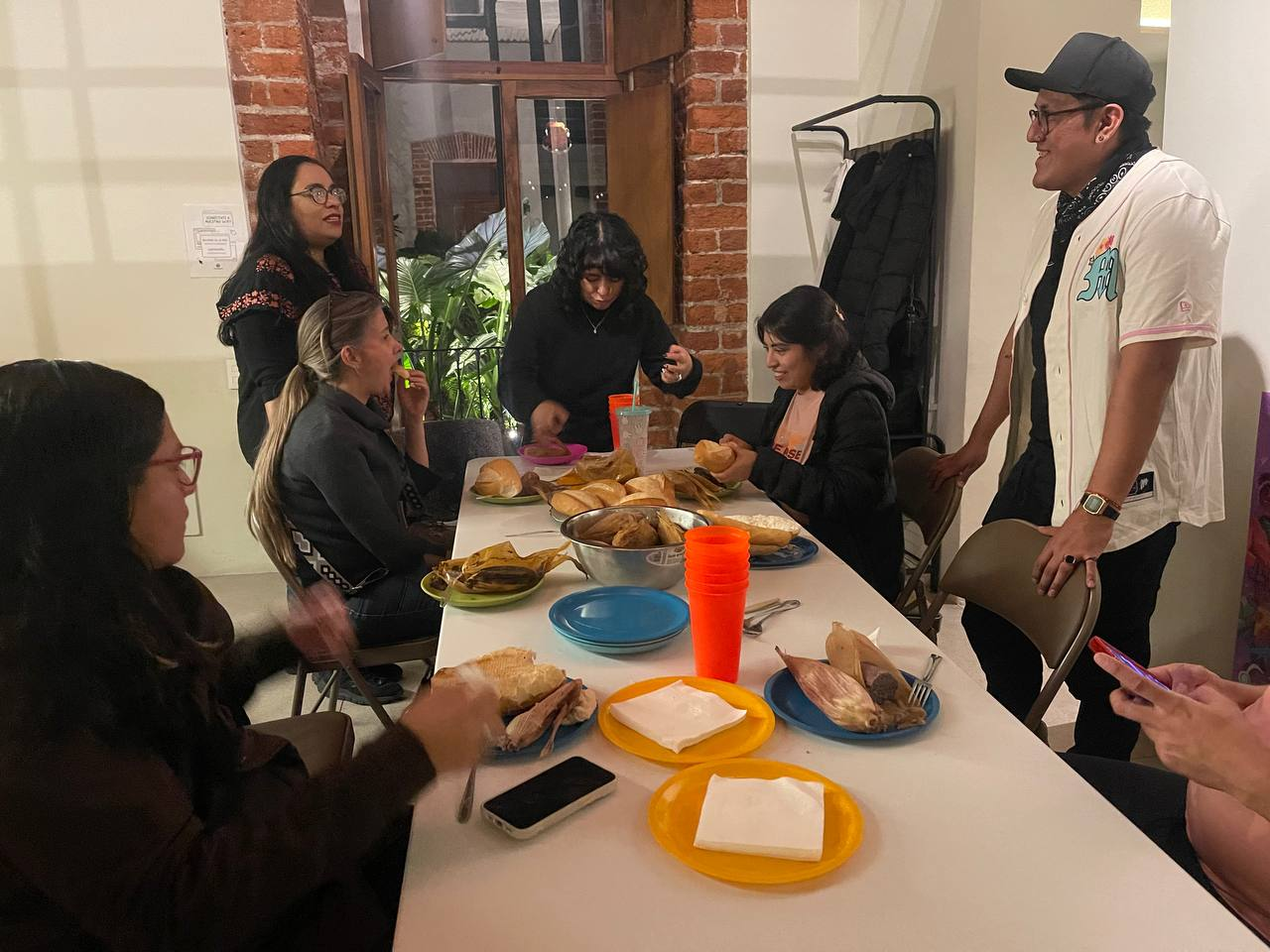
A tamalada or tamaliza in Mexico.

A tamalada or tamaliza in Mexico and Mexican culture, and in some Central American countries, is any secular or religious celebration, festivity, party, gathering or meal, where tamales are served and are the main dish. Historically, it was any gathering, whether at home or outdoors in the country, where tamales were served, thus, it was also synonymous with picnic, an outing or occasion that involves taking a packed meal to be eaten outdoors as tamales are a portable food. It was also defined as a meal among family members or close, intimate friends. It is also known as a tamaliza.

In the United States, among Hispanics in the American Southwest, a “tamalada” is a “tamale making party”, a gathering of family and friends for making tamales, typically done during the Christmas and holiday season.

== History ==
Tamales are a traditional Mesoamerican dish made of masa, a dough made from nixtamalized corn, which is steamed in a corn husk or banana leaves. The wrapping can either be discarded prior to eating or used as a plate. Tamales can be filled with meats, cheeses, fruits, vegetables, herbs, chilies, or any preparation according to taste, and both the filling and the cooking liquid may be seasoned.

As tamales are a favorite comfort food in Mexico, they are often eaten on special occasions, in any type of indoor or outdoor festivity, like a birthday party, as both lunch and dinner, and often accompanied by hot atole or champurrado or maize-based beverages of indigenous origin. A tamalada in Mexico and Mexican culture is, therefore, a “fiesta casera o campestre ”, a home or an outdoor, countryside party or gathering where tamales are the “piece forte” or main dish, or just a meal or lunch where tamales are served. Mexican philologist and linguist, Francisco J. Santamaría, had defined the term in his “Diccionario General de Americanismos” (1942), as: “In Mexico, tamale lunch; a meal in which tamales are served, usually at a family gathering.”

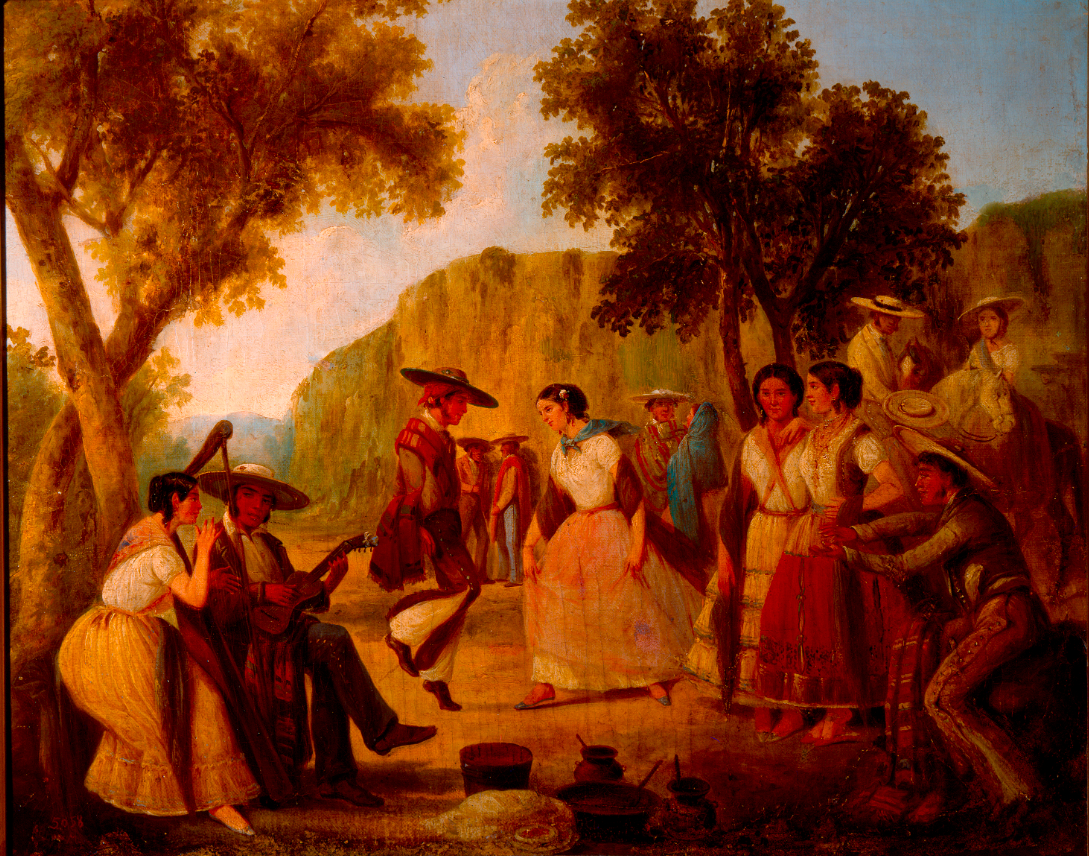
A Día de Campo or Tamalada, with refreshments, music and Jarabe dancing (ca. 1860).

Because tamales are highly portable, they were often eaten outdoors; thus, tamalada was synonymous with picnic or “dia de campo”, an outdoor gathering or feast where a meal is taken outdoors (al fresco) as part of an excursion, especially in scenic surroundings, such as a park, lakeside, or other place affording an interesting view. Tamaladas often included traditional music and dancing, like Jarabe and, besides tamales and atole, it often included chongos, sliced bread with piloncillo and cheese as dessert. In her book “Face to Face with the Mexicans” (1887), American writer, Fanny Chambers Gooch, recounts:

“The tamalada is an outdoor diversion somewhat corresponding to our picnics. It usually occurs in the afternoon, in some quiet wood or beautiful garden, and begins with dancing, which is kept up throughout the afternoon and evening. The refreshments are tamales, after which the entertainment is named-atole de leche and chougas [sic pro chongos]. The latter is simply sliced bread with piloncilla (syrup made from brown sugar) and grated cheese thickly spread over each piece, the whole arranged in pyramid form, and is a most delicious dish. A dia de campo (day in the country) with a gay tamalada party, is a most agreeable recreation.”

In Mexico, one traditional tamalada or tamaliza is done during El Día de la Candelaria or Candlemas. On Epiphany or “Three Kings Day”, Mexican families commemorate the date by eating a Rosca de reyes cake. Inside the cake are hidden small figurines representing the Christ Child. Traditionally, whoever finds the figurine must make the tamales and host a tamalada on Candlemas.

=== In the United States ===
In the United States, in Tejano culture, Chicano culture, and other Hispanics in the American Southwest, a tamalada is different, for them it is a tamale-making party, a social event or gathering of family and friends for making tamales, typically around the Christmas and holiday season. It is not a festivity, picnic, or meal where tamales are served and are the main dish as in Mexican culture, but rather a communal effort where everyone, family and friends, women, men, and children, participates in making tamales from scratch, often with the leadership of a matriarch, a grandmother or mother. Because everyone pitches in, the Hispanic-American “tamalada” often involves a sort of assembly line where different people are assigned tasks, like one would prepare the masa or fillings, another one will be spreading the masa on the corn husks, the other person will add the meat filling and so on, down the line. Many families often have specific recipes and techniques passed down through multiple generations.

== See also ==
- Mexican cuisine
- Salvadoran cuisine
- Honduran cuisine
- Guatemalan cuisine
