= SettleForLove =

Online dating, friendship, and social networking app/website

- Founded: 2014
- Headquarters: Waukesha, Wisconsin
- Key people: David Wheeler, Co-Founder & CEO; Jacob Thompson, Co-Founder & CTO
- Website: settleforlove.com

SettleForLove (Settle For Love sometimes abbreviated as SFL) is a free online dating, friendship, and social networking app/website. Members must upload both good and bad pictures of themselves, as well as list their positive and not so positive traits. The tagline for the app is: "I'm not perfect, but I'm perfect for someone"

== History ==
SettleForLove launched in the summer of 2014. Co-founders David Wheeler and Jacob Thompson launched the site after Wheeler's years of online dating frustrations. SFL has received publicity across the United States and Canada. In Q1 2016, SettleForLove launched both Android & Apple apps to accompany the website.
