= Jacob Thompson =

American politician (1810–1885)

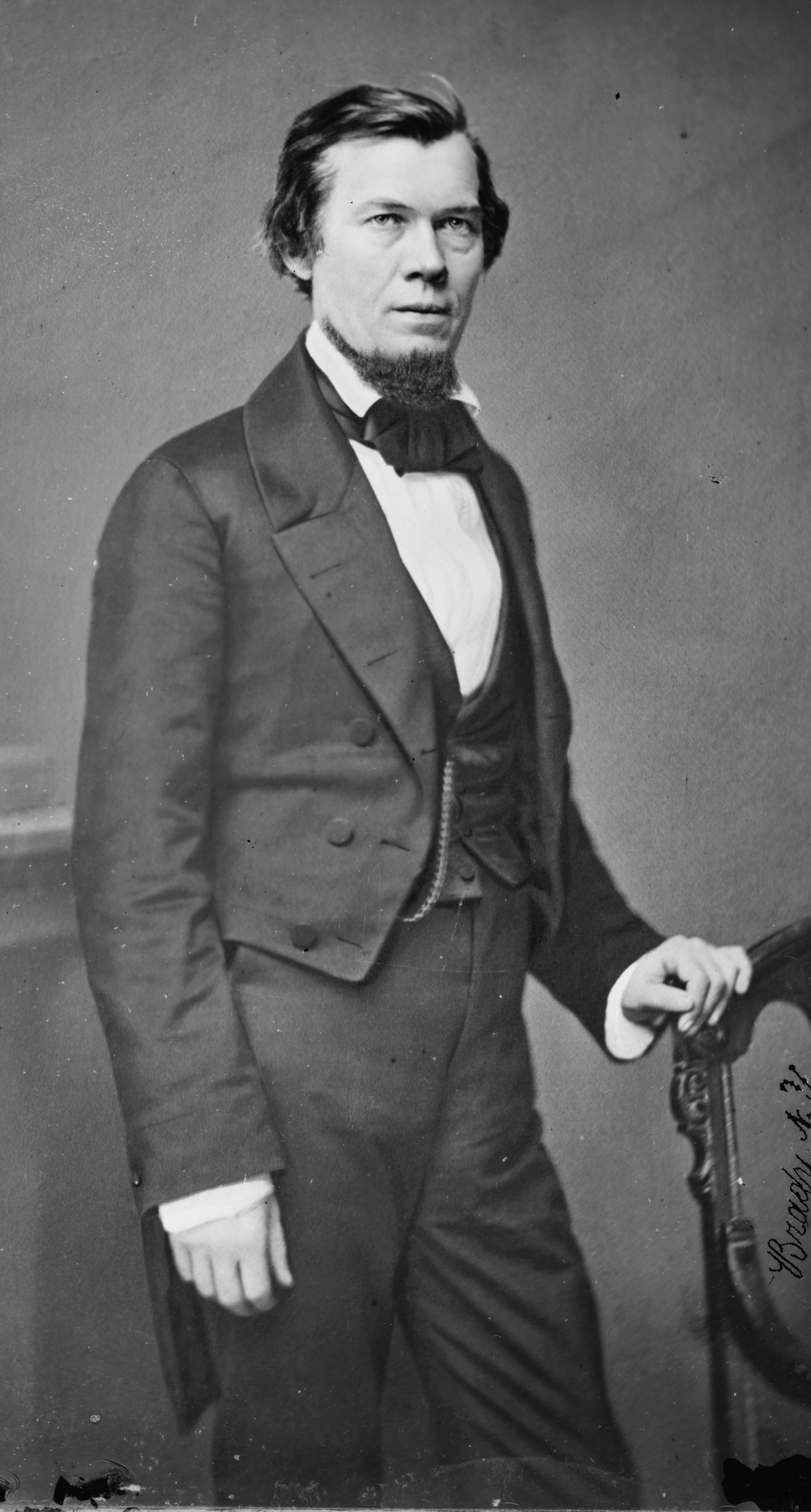
- Thompson between 1855 and 1865, by Mathew Brady

5th United States Secretary of the Interior
- In office March 10, 1857 – January 8, 1861
- President: James Buchanan
- Preceded by: Robert McClelland
- Succeeded by: Caleb Smith

Member of the U.S. House of Representatives from Mississippi
- In office March 4, 1839 – March 3, 1851
- Preceded by: Thomas J. Word (AL); District established (1st)
- Succeeded by: District eliminated (AL); Benjamin D. Nabers (1st)
- Constituency: At-large district (1839-47); 1st district (1847-57)

Personal details
- Born: May 15, 1810 Leasburg, North Carolina, U.S.
- Died: March 24, 1885 (aged 74) Memphis, Tennessee, U.S.
- Resting place: Elmwood Cemetery
- Party: Democratic
- Spouse: Catherine Jones
- Education: University of North Carolina, Chapel Hill (BA)

Jacob Thompson (May 15, 1810 – March 24, 1885) was the United States Secretary of the Interior, who resigned on the outbreak of the American Civil War and became the Inspector General of the Confederate States Army.

In 1864, Jefferson Davis asked Thompson to lead a delegation to Canada, where he appears to have been leader of the Confederate Secret Service. From here, he is known to have organised many anti-Union plots and was suspected of many more, including a possible meeting with Lincoln's assassin, John Wilkes Booth.

Union troops burned down his mansion in Oxford, Mississippi, the hometown of William Faulkner, who based some of his fictional characters on Thompson.

== Early life ==
Born in Leasburg, North Carolina in 1810 to Nicolas Thompson and Lucretia (van Hook) Thompson, Thompson attended Bingham Academy in Orange County, North Carolina and later went on to graduate from the University of North Carolina in 1831, where he was a member of the Philanthropic Society. Afterwards, he served on the university faculty for a short time until he left to study law in 1832. He was admitted to the bar in 1834 and established a law practice in Pontotoc, Mississippi in 1837, and made an unsuccessful bid to become the state attorney general.

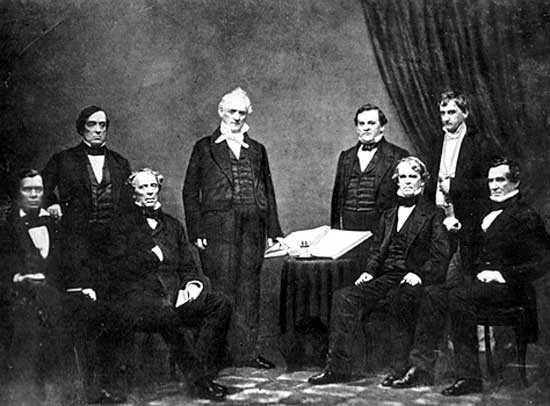
President Buchanan and his Cabinet From left to right: Jacob Thompson, Lewis Cass, John B. Floyd, James Buchanan, Howell Cobb, Isaac Toucey, Joseph Holt and Jeremiah S. Black, (c. 1859)

=== Congressional years ===
Thompson's involvement in politics began in earnest as he was elected to the 26th Congress, serving through to the 31st Congress (1849–1851).

He was appointed to the United States Senate in 1845 but never received the commission, and the seat went to Joseph W. Chalmers. Thompson was the chairman of the Committee on Indian Affairs in the 29th Congress. He lost reelection to the 32nd Congress and went back to practicing law in Mississippi. In 1853, when President Franklin Pierce offered him to become a U.S Consul to Havana he refused it. Thompson lost the 1855 senate election to Jefferson Davis, but in 1857, newly elected President James Buchanan appointed Thompson United States Secretary of the Interior from 1857 to 1861.

In the later years of the Buchanan administration, the cabinet members argued with one another on issues of slavery and secession. In an 1859 speech, Thompson advanced a moderate unionist position. He denounced Republicans in the North who spoke of the slavery issue as an "irrepressible conflict" and Southern extremists who favored reopening the Atlantic slave trade.

=== Alignment with Confederacy ===
While still serving as Interior Secretary, Thompson was appointed by the state of Mississippi as a "secession commissioner" to North Carolina and tasked to convince that state to secede from the Union in the wake of the 1860 presidential election. On December 17, he passed through Baltimore on the way to North Carolina. "Secretary Thompson has entered openly into the secession service, while professing still to serve the Federal authority," The New York Times reported on December 20. The next day, Thompson met with Governor John W. Ellis in Raleigh. He wrote an open letter to Ellis which was published in the Raileigh State Journal on December 20. Thompson wrote that the South faced "common humiliation and ruin" if it remained in the Union. He warned that a Northern "majority trained from infancy to hate our people and their institutions" would overthrow slavery. The result would be "the subjugation of our people."

Thompson resigned as Interior Secretary in January 1861. When he resigned, Horace Greeley's New-York Daily Tribune denounced him as "a traitor", remarking, "Undertaking to overthrow the Government of which you are a sworn minister may be in accordance with the ideas of cotton-growing chivalry, but to common men cannot be made to appear creditable."

Thompson became Inspector General of the Confederate States Army. Though not a military man, Thompson later joined the army as an officer and served as an aide to General P.G.T. Beauregard at the Battle of Shiloh.

He attained the rank of lieutenant colonel and was present at several other battles in the Western Theater of the war, including Corinth, Vicksburg, and Tupelo.

=== Commissioner in Canada ===
In March 1864, Jefferson Davis asked Thompson to lead a secret delegation in Canada. He accepted and arrived in Montreal in May of that year. Thompson appears to have been the leader of Confederate Secret Service operations in Canada.

From there, he directed a failed plot to free Confederate prisoners of war on Johnson's Island, off Sandusky, Ohio, in September. He also arranged the purchase of a steamer, with the intention of arming it to harass shipping in the Great Lakes. Regarded in the North as a schemer and conspirator, many devious plots were associated with his name, though much of this may have been public hysteria.

On June 13, 1864, Thompson met with former New York Governor Washington Hunt at Niagara Falls. According to the testimony of the Peace Democrat Clement Vallandigham, Hunt met Thompson, talked to him about creating a Northwestern Confederacy, and obtained money for arms, which was routed to a subordinate. Thompson gave Benjamin Wood, the owner of the New York Daily News, money to purchase arms.

One plot was a planned burning of New York City on November 25, 1864 in retaliation for Union Generals Philip Sheridan and William Tecumseh Sherman's scorched-earth tactics in the South.

Some speculate that John Wilkes Booth, who assassinated Abraham Lincoln, met Thompson, but that has not been proved. (In the years after the war, Thompson worked hard to clear his name of involvement in the assassination.) His manor, called "Home Place," in Oxford, Mississippi was burned down by Union troops in 1864.

In the spring of 1865, Canadian customs raided a house in Toronto that had been rented by Thompson. They found coal torpedoes and other incendiary devices hidden beneath the floorboards.

== Postwar ==
After the Civil War, Thompson fled to England and later returned to Canada as he waited for passions to cool in the United States. He eventually came home and settled in Memphis, Tennessee, to manage his extensive holdings. Thompson was later appointed to the board of the University of the South at Sewanee and was a great benefactor of it.

== Death ==
Jacob Thompson died in Memphis, Tennessee and was interred in Elmwood Cemetery. Republicans and Union veterans condemned the Grover Cleveland administration's lowering of flags to half-mast in Washington and Secretary of Interior Lucius Quintus Cincinnatus Lamar II's closure of the Department of Interior to honor Thompson after his death.

== Bibliography ==
- Dew, Charles B. (2001). Apostles of Disunion: Southern Secession Commissioners and the Causes of the Civil War. Charlottesville, VA: University of Virginia Press. ISBN 978-08139-3945-2.

U.S. House of Representatives
Preceded by Thomas J. Word; Seargent S. Prentiss	Member of the U.S. House of Representatives from Mississippi's at-large congressional district March 4, 1839 – March 3, 1847; Served alongside: Albert G. Brown, William M. Gwin, William H. Hammett, Robert W. Roberts, Tilghman M. Tucker, Stephen Adams, Jefferson Davis and Henry T. Ellett	Succeeded by (none)
Preceded by (none)	Member of the U.S. House of Representatives from Mississippi's 1st congressional district March 4, 1847 – March 3, 1851	Succeeded by Benjamin D. Nabers
Political offices
Preceded by Robert McClelland	U.S. Secretary of the Interior; Served under: James Buchanan; March 10, 1857 – January 8, 1861	Succeeded by Caleb B. Smith
