= 25th United States Congress =

1837-1839 U.S. Congress

←	24th	26th	→
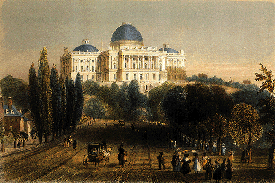
- United States Capitol (1827)

Overview
- Legislative body: United States Congress
- Jurisdiction: United States
- Term: March 4, 1837 – March 4, 1839

Senate
- Members: 52
- President: Richard M. Johnson (D)
- President pro tempore: William R. King (D)
- Party control: Democratic

House of Representatives
- Members: 242 representatives 3 non-voting delegates
- Speaker: James K. Polk (D)
- Party control: Democratic

Sessions
- Special (Note: Special session of the Senate.): March 4, 1837 – March 10, 1837
- 1st: September 4, 1837 – October 16, 1837
- 2nd: December 4, 1837 – July 9, 1838
- 3rd: December 3, 1838 – March 3, 1839

The 25th United States Congress was a meeting of the legislative branch of the United States federal government, consisting of the United States Senate and the United States House of Representatives. It met in Washington, D.C. from March 4, 1837, to March 4, 1839, during the first two years of Martin Van Buren's presidency.

The apportionment of seats in the House of Representatives was based on the 1830 United States census. Both houses of congress had a Democratic majority.

== Major events ==
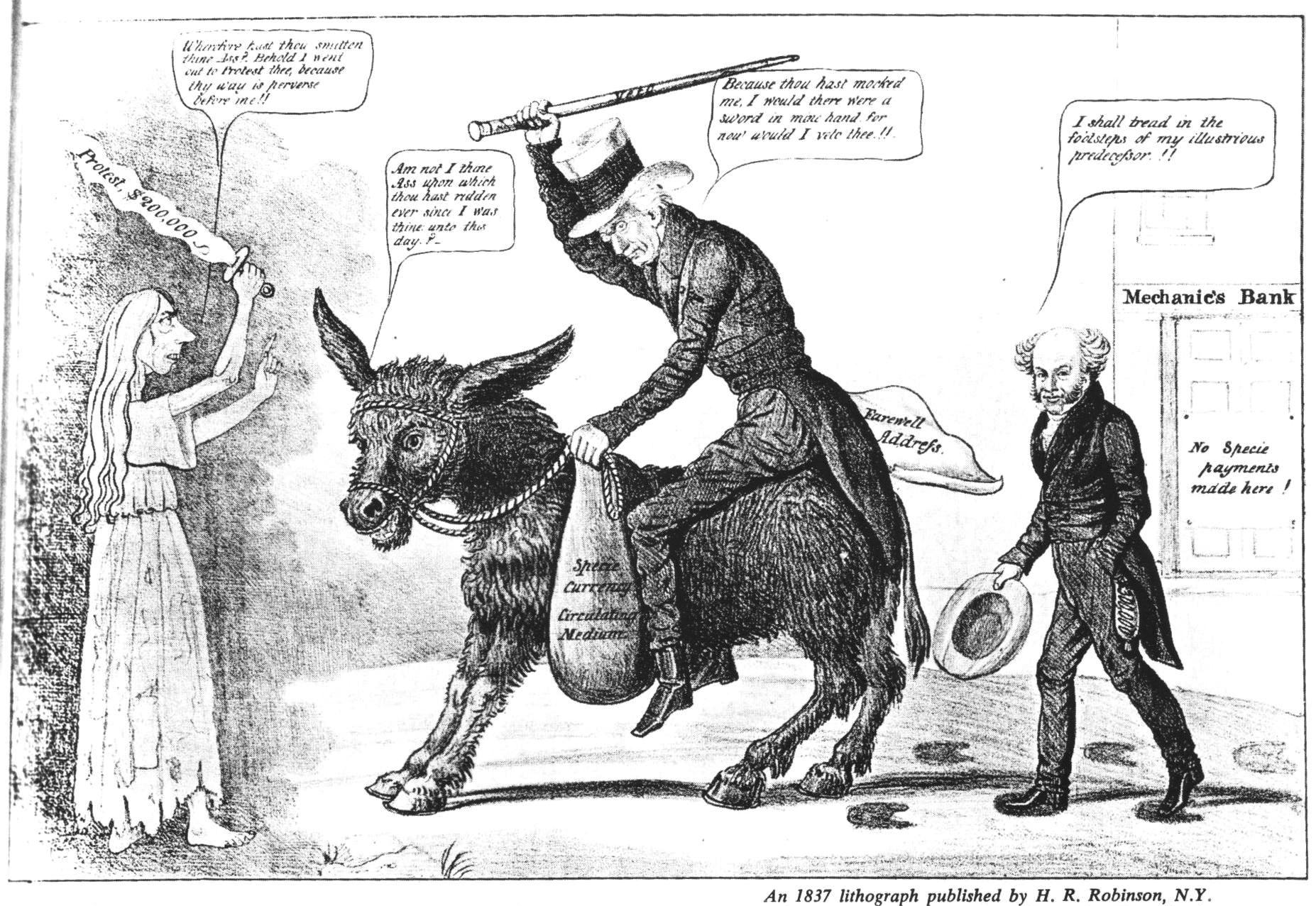
The Modern Balaam and His Ass, an 1837 caricature placing the blame for the Panic of 1837 and the perilous state of the banking system on outgoing President Andrew Jackson, shown riding a donkey, while President Martin Van Buren comments approvingly.

- March 4, 1837: Martin Van Buren became President of the United States
- May 10, 1837: Panic of 1837
- January 6, 1838: First public demonstration of Samuel Morse's telegraph
- May 26, 1838: Trail of Tears: The Cherokee removal began

== Major legislation ==
- [data missing]
- The Treasury Notes Act of 1837
- The Militia Volunteer Act of 1839

== Territories organized ==
- June 12, 1838: Iowa Territory was formed from the Wisconsin Territory.

== Party summary ==
The count below identifies party affiliations at the beginning of the first session of this congress. Changes resulting from subsequent replacements are shown below in the "Changes in membership" section.

=== Senate ===
Senate membership

Beginning of the Congress

End of the Congress

	Party (shading shows control)			Total	Vacant
	Democratic (D)	Whig (W)	Other	Total	Vacant
End of previous congress	31 (Note: Jacksonians)	19 (Note: Anti-Jacksonians)	2 (Note: Nullifier)	52	0
Begin	35	17	0	52	0
End	35	16	0	51	1
Final voting share	68.6%	31.4%	0.0%		
Beginning of next congress	28	19	0	47	5

=== House of Representatives ===
House membership

Beginning of the Congress

Ending of the Congress

	Party (shading shows control)					Total	Vacant
	Anti- Masonic (AM)	Democratic (D)	Nullifier (N)	Whig (W)	Other	Total	Vacant
End of previous congress	14	139 (Note: Jacksonians)	7	81 (Note: Anti-Jacksonians)	0	241	1
Begin	7	128	4	101	0	240	2
End	7	123	4	106	0	240	2
Final voting share	2.9%	51.3%	1.7%	44.2%	0.0%		
Non-voting members	0	2	0	0	1	3	0
Beginning of next congress	6	124	0	109	2	241	1

== Leadership ==
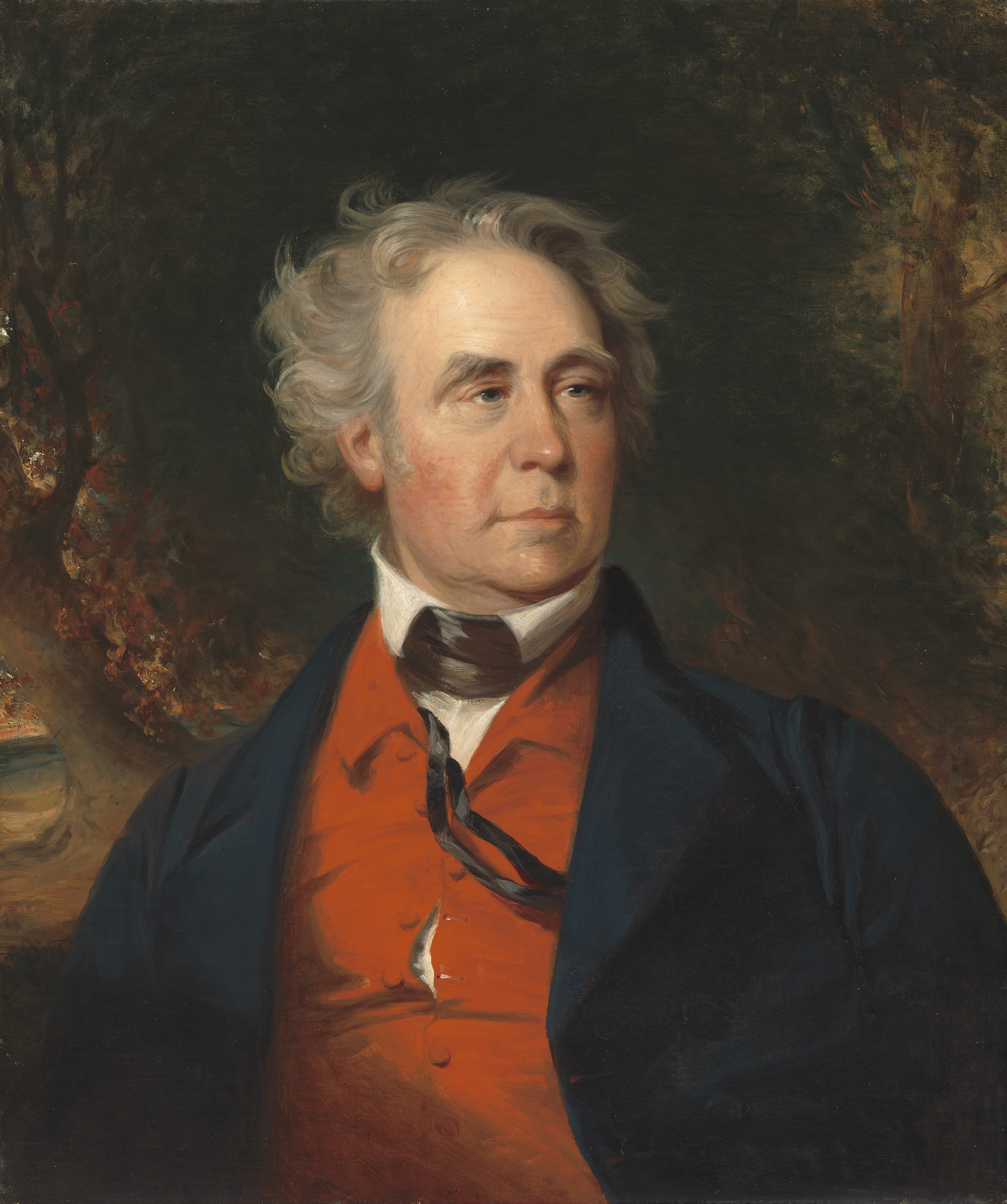
President of the Senate Richard M. Johnson

=== Senate ===
- President: Richard Mentor Johnson (D)
- President pro tempore: William R. King (D)

=== House of Representatives ===
- Speaker: James K. Polk (D)

== Members ==
This list is arranged by chamber, then by state. Senators are listed by class, and representatives by district.

Skip to House of Representatives, below

=== Senate ===
Senators were elected by the state legislatures every two years, with one-third beginning new six-year terms with each Congress. Preceding the names in the list below are Senate class numbers, which indicate the cycle of their election. In this Congress, Class 1 meant their term ended with this Congress, ending in 1839; Class 2 meant their term began in the last Congress, ending in 1841; and Class 3 meant their term began in this Congress, ending in 1843.

==== Alabama ====
▌2. William R. King (D)
▌3. John McKinley (D), until April 22, 1837

▌Clement C. Clay (D), from June 19, 1837

==== Arkansas ====
▌2. William S. Fulton (D)
▌3. Ambrose H. Sevier (D)

==== Connecticut ====
▌1. John M. Niles (D)
▌3. Perry Smith (D)

==== Delaware ====
▌1. Richard H. Bayard (W)
▌2. Thomas Clayton (W)

==== Georgia ====
▌2. John P. King (D), until November 1, 1837

▌Wilson Lumpkin (D), from November 22, 1837

▌3. Alfred Cuthbert (D)

==== Illinois ====
▌2. John M. Robinson (D)
▌3. Richard M. Young (D)

==== Indiana ====
▌1. John Tipton (D)
▌3. Oliver H. Smith (W)

==== Kentucky ====
▌2. John J. Crittenden (W)
▌3. Henry Clay (W)

==== Louisiana ====
▌2. Robert C. Nicholas (D)
▌3. Alexander Mouton (D)

==== Maine ====
▌1. Reuel Williams (D)
▌2. John Ruggles (D)

==== Maryland ====
▌1. Joseph Kent (W), until November 24, 1837

▌William D. Merrick (W), from January 4, 1838

▌3. John S. Spence (W)

==== Massachusetts ====
▌1. Daniel Webster (W)
▌2. John Davis (W)

==== Michigan ====
▌1. Lucius Lyon (D)
▌2. John Norvell (D)

==== Mississippi ====
▌1. John Black (W), until January 22, 1838

▌James F. Trotter (D), from January 22, 1838, until July 10, 1838
▌Thomas Hickman Williams (D), from November 12, 1838

▌2. Robert J. Walker (D)

==== Missouri ====
▌1. Thomas H. Benton (D)
▌3. Lewis F. Linn (D)

==== New Hampshire ====
▌2. Henry Hubbard (D)
▌3. Franklin Pierce (D)

==== New Jersey ====
▌1. Samuel L. Southard (W)
▌2. Garret D. Wall (D)

==== New York ====
▌1. Nathaniel P. Tallmadge (D)
▌3. Silas Wright Jr. (D)

==== North Carolina ====
▌2. Bedford Brown (D)
▌3. Robert Strange (D)

==== Ohio ====
▌1. Thomas Morris (D)
▌3. William Allen (D)

==== Pennsylvania ====
▌1. Samuel McKean (D)
▌3. James Buchanan (D)

==== Rhode Island ====
▌1. Asher Robbins (W)
▌2. Nehemiah R. Knight (W)

==== South Carolina ====
▌2. John C. Calhoun (D)
▌3. William C. Preston (W)

==== Tennessee ====
▌1. Felix Grundy (D), until July 4, 1838

▌Ephraim H. Foster (W), from September 17, 1838 – March 3, 1839

▌2. Hugh Lawson White (W)

==== Vermont ====
▌1. Benjamin Swift (W)
▌3. Samuel Prentiss (W)

==== Virginia ====
▌1. William C. Rives (D)
▌2. Richard E. Parker (D), until March 4, 1837

▌William H. Roane (D), from March 14, 1837

Senators' party membership by state at the opening of the 25th Congress in March 1837. 2 Democrats 1 Democrat and 1 Whig 2 Whigs

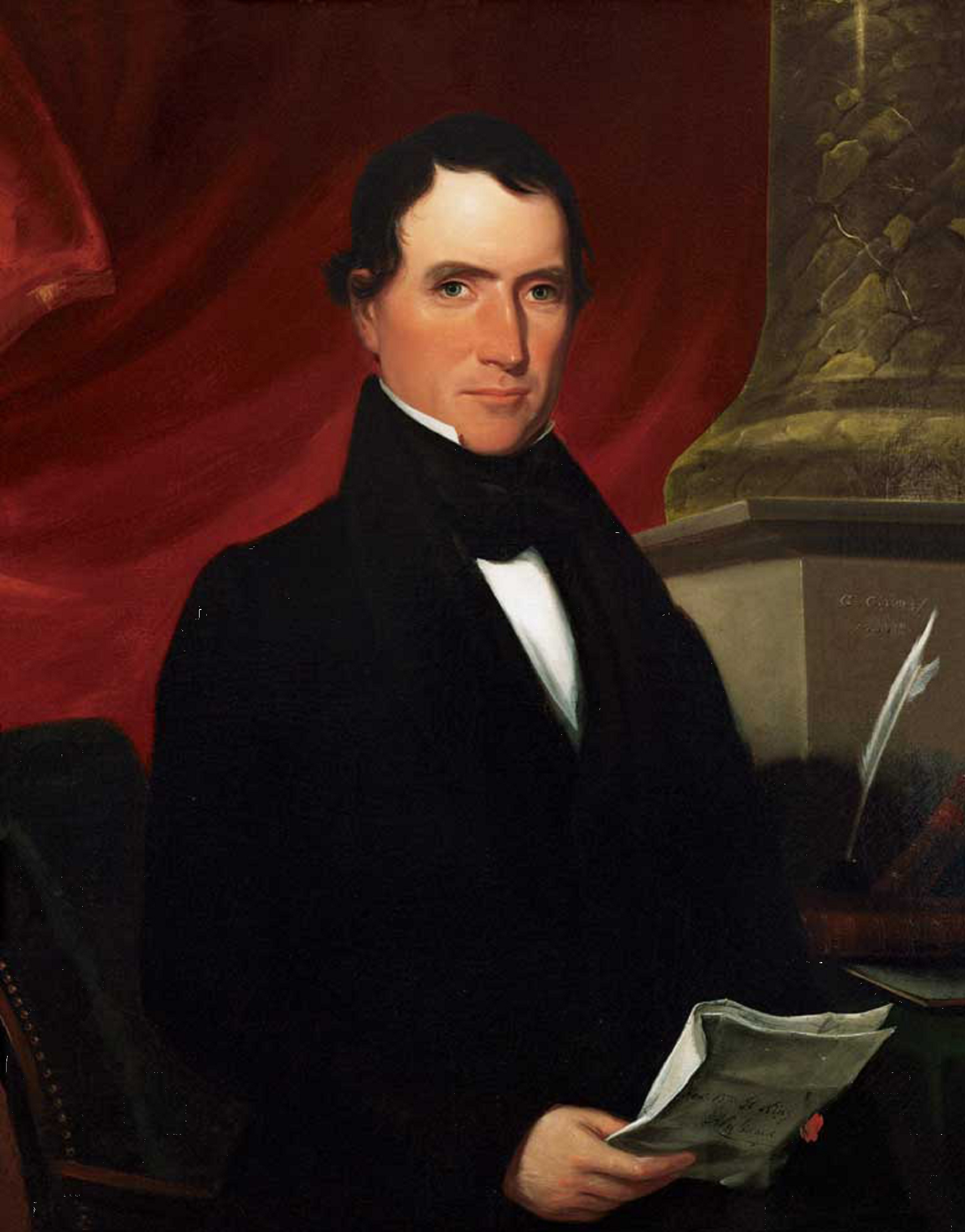
President pro tempore William R. King

=== House of Representatives ===
The names of representatives are preceded by their district numbers.

==== Alabama ====
▌1. Reuben Chapman (D)
▌2. Joshua L. Martin (D)
▌3. Joab Lawler (W), until May 8, 1838

▌George W. Crabb (W), from September 4, 1838

▌4. Dixon H. Lewis (D)
▌5. Francis S. Lyon (W)

==== Arkansas ====
▌At-large. Archibald Yell (D)

==== Connecticut ====
All representatives were elected statewide on a general ticket.

▌1. Isaac Toucey (D)
▌2. Samuel Ingham (D)
▌3. Elisha Haley (D)
▌4. Thomas T. Whittlesey (D)
▌5. Lancelot Phelps (D)
▌6. Orrin Holt (D)

==== Delaware ====
▌At-large. John J. Milligan (W)

==== Georgia ====
All representatives were elected statewide on a general ticket.

▌At-large. Jesse F. Cleveland (D)
▌At-large. William C. Dawson (W)
▌At-large. Thomas Glascock (D)
▌At-large. Seaton Grantland (D)
▌At-large. Charles E. Haynes (D)
▌At-large. Hopkins Holsey (D)
▌At-large. Jabez Y. Jackson (D)
▌At-large. George W. Owens (D)
▌At-large. George W. B. Towns (D)

==== Illinois ====
▌1. Adam W. Snyder (D)
▌2. Zadok Casey (D)
▌3. William L. May (D)

==== Indiana ====
▌1. Ratliff Boon (D)
▌2. John Ewing (W)
▌3. William Graham (W)
▌4. George H. Dunn (W)
▌5. James Rariden (W)
▌6. William Herod (W)
▌7. Albert S. White (W)

==== Kentucky ====
▌1. John L. Murray (D)
▌2. Edward Rumsey (W)
▌3. Joseph R. Underwood (W)
▌4. Sherrod Williams (W)
▌5. James Harlan (W)
▌6. John Calhoon (W)
▌7. John Pope (W)
▌8. William J. Graves (W)
▌9. John White (W)
▌10. Richard Hawes (W)
▌11. Richard H. Menefee (W)
▌12. John Chambers (W)
▌13. William W. Southgate (W)

==== Louisiana ====
▌1. Henry Johnson (W)
▌2. Eleazar W. Ripley (D), until March 2, 1839
▌3. Rice Garland (W)

==== Maine ====
▌1. John Fairfield (D), until December 24, 1838
▌2. Francis O. J. Smith (D)
▌3. Jonathan Cilley (D), until February 24, 1838

▌Edward Robinson (W), from April 28, 1838

▌4. George Evans (W)
▌5. Timothy J. Carter (D), until March 14, 1838

▌Virgil D. Parris (D), from May 29, 1838

▌6. Hugh J. Anderson (D)
▌7. Joseph C. Noyes (W)
▌8. Thomas Davee (D)

==== Maryland ====
The 4th district was a plural district with two representatives.

▌1. John Dennis (W)
▌2. James A. Pearce (W)
▌3. John T. H. Worthington (D)
▌4. Benjamin C. Howard (D)
▌4. Isaac McKim (D), until April 1, 1838

▌John P. Kennedy (W), from April 25, 1838

▌5. William Cost Johnson (W)
▌6. Francis Thomas (D)
▌7. Daniel Jenifer (W)

==== Massachusetts ====
▌1. Richard Fletcher (W)
▌2. Stephen C. Phillips (W), until September 28, 1838

▌Leverett Saltonstall I (W), from December 25, 1838

▌3. Caleb Cushing (W)
▌4. William Parmenter (D)
▌5. Levi Lincoln Jr. (W)
▌6. George Grennell Jr. (W)
▌7. George N. Briggs (W)
▌8. William B. Calhoun (W)
▌9. William S. Hastings (W)
▌10. Nathaniel B. Borden (D)
▌11. John Reed Jr. (W)
▌12. John Quincy Adams (W)

==== Michigan ====
▌At-large. Isaac E. Crary (D)

==== Mississippi ====
Both representatives were elected statewide on a general ticket.

▌At-large. John F. H. Claiborne (D), from July 18, 1837, until February 5, 1838

▌Seargent S. Prentiss (W), from May 30, 1838

▌At-large. Samuel J. Gholson (D), from July 18, 1837, until February 5, 1838

▌Thomas J. Word (W), from May 30, 1838

==== Missouri ====
Both representatives were elected statewide on a general ticket.

▌At-large. Albert G. Harrison (D)
▌At-large. John Miller (D)

==== New Hampshire ====
All representatives were elected statewide on a general ticket.

▌At-large. Charles G. Atherton (D)
▌At-large. Samuel Cushman (D)
▌At-large. James Farrington (D)
▌At-large. Joseph Weeks (D)
▌At-large. Jared W. Williams (D)

==== New Jersey ====
All representatives were elected statewide on a general ticket.

▌At-large. John B. Aycrigg (W)
▌At-large. William Halstead (W)
▌At-large. John P. B. Maxwell (W)
▌At-large. Joseph F. Randolph (W)
▌At-large. Charles C. Stratton (W)
▌At-large. Thomas Jones Yorke (W)

==== New York ====
There were four plural districts, the 8th, 17th, 22nd & 23rd had two representatives each, the 3rd had four representatives.

▌1. Thomas B. Jackson (D)
▌2. Abraham Vanderveer (D)
▌3. Churchill C. Cambreleng (D)
▌3. Edward Curtis (W)
▌3. Ogden Hoffman (W)
▌3. Ely Moore (D)
▌4. Gouverneur Kemble (D)
▌5. Obadiah Titus (D)
▌6. Nathaniel Jones (D)
▌7. John C. Brodhead (D)
▌8. Robert McClellan (D)
▌8. Zadock Pratt (D)
▌9. Henry Vail (D)
▌10. Albert Gallup (D)
▌11. John I. De Graff (D)
▌12. David A. Russell (W)
▌13. John Palmer (D)
▌14. James B. Spencer (D)
▌15. John Edwards (D)
▌16. Arphaxed Loomis (D)
▌17. Henry A. Foster (D)
▌17. Abraham P. Grant (D)
▌18. Isaac H. Bronson (D)
▌19. John H. Prentiss (D)
▌20. Amasa J. Parker (D)
▌21. John C. Clark (D)
▌22. Andrew D. W. Bruyn (D), until July 27, 1838

▌Cyrus Beers (D), from December 3, 1838

▌22. Hiram Gray (D)
▌23. Bennet Bicknell (D)
▌23. William Taylor (D)
▌24. William H. Noble (D)
▌25. Samuel Birdsall (D)
▌26. Mark H. Sibley (W)
▌27. John T. Andrews (D)
▌28. Timothy Childs (W)
▌29. William Patterson (W), until August 14, 1838

▌Harvey Putnam (W), from November 7, 1838

▌30. Luther C. Peck (W)
▌31. Richard P. Marvin (W)
▌32. Millard Fillmore (W)
▌33. Charles F. Mitchell (W)

==== North Carolina ====
▌1. Samuel T. Sawyer (W)
▌2. Jesse A. Bynum (D)
▌3. Edward Stanly (W)
▌4. Charles B. Shepard (W)
▌5. James I. McKay (D)
▌6. Micajah T. Hawkins (D)
▌7. Edmund Deberry (W)
▌8. William Montgomery (D)
▌9. Augustine H. Shepperd (W)
▌10. Abraham Rencher (W)
▌11. Henry W. Connor (D)
▌12. James Graham (W)
▌13. Lewis Williams (W)

==== Ohio ====
▌1. Alexander Duncan (D)
▌2. Taylor Webster (D)
▌3. Patrick G. Goode (W)
▌4. Thomas Corwin (W)
▌5. Thomas L. Hamer (D)
▌6. Calvary Morris (W)
▌7. William K. Bond (W)
▌8. Joseph Ridgway (W)
▌9. John Chaney (D)
▌10. Samson Mason (W)
▌11. James Alexander Jr. (W)
▌12. Alexander Harper (W)
▌13. Daniel P. Leadbetter (D)
▌14. William H. Hunter (D)
▌15. John W. Allen (W)
▌16. Elisha Whittlesey (W), until July 9, 1838

▌Joshua R. Giddings (W), from December 3, 1838

▌17. Andrew W. Loomis (W), until October 20, 1837

▌Charles D. Coffin (W), from December 20, 1837

▌18. Matthias Shepler (D)
▌19. Daniel Kilgore (D), until July 4, 1838

▌Henry Swearingen (D), from December 3, 1838

==== Pennsylvania ====
There were two plural districts, the 2nd had two representatives, the 4th had three representatives.

▌1. Lemuel Paynter (D)
▌2. John Sergeant (W)
▌2. George W. Toland (W)
▌3. Francis J. Harper (D), until March 18, 1837

▌Charles Naylor (W), from June 29, 1837

▌4. Edward Darlington (AM)
▌4. Edward Davies (AM)
▌4. David Potts Jr. (AM)
▌5. Jacob Fry Jr. (D)
▌6. Mathias Morris (W)
▌7. David D. Wagener (D)
▌8. Edward B. Hubley (D)
▌9. Henry A. P. Muhlenberg (D), until February 9, 1838

▌George M. Keim (D), from March 17, 1838

▌10. Luther Reily (D)
▌11. Henry Logan (D)
▌12. Daniel Sheffer (D)
▌13. Charles McClure (D)
▌14. William W. Potter (D)
▌15. David Petrikin (D)
▌16. Robert H. Hammond (D)
▌17. Samuel W. Morris (D)
▌18. Charles Ogle (AM)
▌19. John J. Klingensmith Jr. (D)
▌20. Andrew Buchanan (D)
▌21. Thomas M. T. McKennan (AM)
▌22. Richard Biddle (AM)
▌23. William Beatty (D)
▌24. Thomas Henry (AM)
▌25. Arnold Plumer (D)

==== Rhode Island ====
Both representatives were elected statewide on a general ticket.

▌At-large. Robert B. Cranston (W)
▌At-large. Joseph L. Tillinghast (W)

==== South Carolina ====
▌1. Hugh S. Legaré (D)
▌2. Robert Rhett (D)
▌3. John Campbell (N)
▌4. Franklin H. Elmore (States Rights D)
▌5. Francis W. Pickens (N)
▌6. Waddy Thompson Jr. (W)
▌7. William K. Clowney (N)
▌8. John P. Richardson (D)
▌9. John K. Griffin (N)

==== Tennessee ====
▌1. William B. Carter (W)
▌2. Abraham McClellan (D)
▌3. Joseph L. Williams (W)
▌4. James I. Standifer (W), until August 20, 1837

▌William Stone (W), from September 14, 1837

▌5. Hopkins L. Turney (D)
▌6. William B. Campbell (W)
▌7. John Bell (W)
▌8. Abram P. Maury (W)
▌9. James K. Polk (D)
▌10. Ebenezer J. Shields (W)
▌11. Richard Cheatham (W)
▌12. John W. Crockett (W)
▌13. Christopher H. Williams (W)

==== Vermont ====
▌1. Hiland Hall (W)
▌2. William Slade (W)
▌3. Horace Everett (W)
▌4. Heman Allen (W)
▌5. Isaac Fletcher (D)

==== Virginia ====
▌1. Francis Mallory (W)
▌2. Francis E. Rives (D)
▌3. John W. Jones (D)
▌4. George C. Dromgoole (D)
▌5. James W. Bouldin (D)
▌6. Walter Coles (D)
▌7. Archibald Stuart (D)
▌8. Henry A. Wise (W)
▌9. Robert M. T. Hunter (W)
▌10. John Taliaferro (W)
▌11. John Robertson (W)
▌12. James Garland (D)
▌13. John M. Patton (D), until April 7, 1838

▌Linn Banks (D), from April 28, 1838

▌14. Charles F. Mercer (W)
▌15. James M. Mason (D)
▌16. Isaac S. Pennybacker (D)
▌17. Robert Craig (D)
▌18. George W. Hopkins (D)
▌19. Andrew Beirne (D)
▌20. Joseph Johnson (D)
▌21. William S. Morgan (D)

==== Non-voting members ====
Florida Territory. Charles Downing
▌Iowa Territory. William W. Chapman (D), from September 10, 1838
▌Wisconsin Territory. George Wallace Jones (D), until January 14, 1839

▌James D. Doty (D), from January 14, 1839

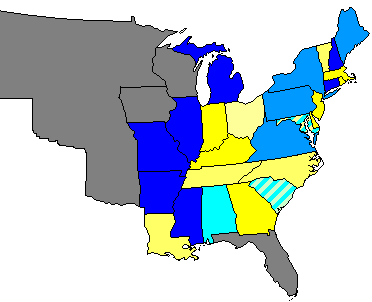
House seats by party holding plurality in state: 80+% to 100% Democratic / Up to 60% Whig; 60+% to 80% Democratic / 60+% to 80% Whig; Up to 60% Democratic / 80+% to 100% Whig

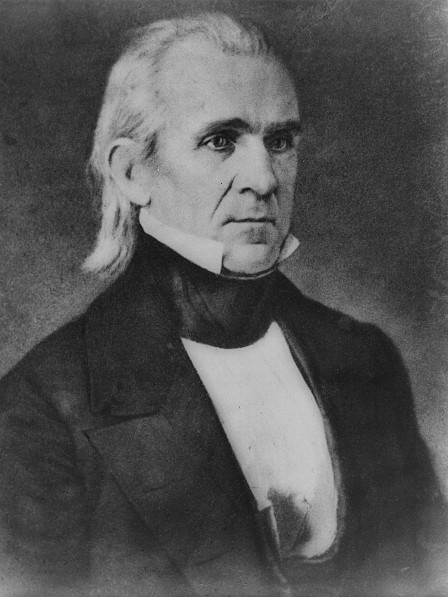
Speaker of the House James Polk

== Changes in membership ==
The count below reflects changes from the beginning of the first session of this Congress.

=== Senate ===
- Replacements: 6
  - Democrats: no net change
  - Whigs: no net change
- Deaths: 1
- Resignations: 6
- Total seats with changes: 7

Senate changes
State (class)	Vacated by	Reason for change	Successor	Date of successor's formal installation (Note: When seated or oath administered, not necessarily when service began.)
Virginia (2)	Richard E. Parker (D)	Resigned March 4, 1837, after accepting a seat on the Virginia Supreme Court of Appeals	William H. Roane (D)	Elected March 14, 1837
Alabama (3)	John McKinley (D)	Resigned April 22, 1837, after being appointed Associate Justice of the United States Supreme Court	Clement C. Clay (D)	Elected June 19, 1837
Georgia (2)	John P. King (D)	Resigned November 1, 1837	Wilson Lumpkin (D)	Elected November 22, 1837
Maryland (1)	Joseph Kent (W)	Died November 24, 1837	William D. Merrick (W)	Elected January 4, 1838
Mississippi (1)	John Black (W)	Resigned January 22, 1838	James F. Trotter (D)	Appointed January 22, 1838
Tennessee (1)	Felix Grundy (D)	Resigned July 4, 1838, after being appointed United States Attorney General	Ephraim H. Foster (W)	Elected September 17, 1838
Mississippi (1)	James F. Trotter (D)	Resigned July 10, 1838	Thomas H. Williams (D)	Appointed November 12, 1838, and subsequently elected
Tennessee (1)	Ephraim H. Foster (W)	Resigned March 3, 1839 before start of new Congress under orders of state legislature.	Vacant	

=== House of Representatives ===
- Replacements: 16
  - Democrats: 5-seat net loss
  - Whigs: 5-seat net gain
- Deaths: 9
- Resignations: 6
- Contested election:1
- Total seats with changes: 20

House changes
District	Vacated by	Reason for change	Successor	Date of successor's formal installation
Mississippi at-large	Vacant	Rep-elect Claiborne presented credentials July 18, 1837	John F. H. Claiborne (D)	Seated July 18, 1837
Mississippi at-large	Vacant	Rep-elect Gholson presented credentials July 18, 1837	Samuel J. Gholson (D)	Seated July 18, 1837
Pennsylvania 3rd	Francis J. Harper (D)	Died March 18, 1837	Charles Naylor (W)	Seated June 29, 1837
Tennessee 4th	James I. Standifer (W)	Died August 20, 1837	William Stone (W)	Seated September 14, 1837
Ohio 17th	Elisha Whittlesey (W)	Resigned October 20, 1837	Charles D. Coffin (W)	Seated December 20, 1837
Mississippi at-large	John F. H. Claiborne (D)	Seat declared vacant February 5, 1838	Seargent S. Prentiss (W)	Seated May 30, 1838
Mississippi at-large	Samuel J. Gholson (D)	Seat declared vacant February 5, 1838	Thomas J. Word (W)	Seated May 30, 1838
Pennsylvania 9th	Henry A. P. Muhlenberg (D)	Resigned February 9, 1838, after being appointed Minister to Austrian Empire	George M. Keim (D)	Seated March 17, 1838
Maine 3rd	Jonathan Cilley (D)	Killed in a duel February 24, 1838, by Rep. William J. Graves	Edward Robinson (W)	Seated April 28, 1838
Maine 5th	Timothy J. Carter (D)	Died March 14, 1838	Virgil D. Parris (D)	Seated May 29, 1838
Maryland 4th	Isaac McKim (D)	Died April 1, 1838	John P. Kennedy (W)	Seated April 25, 1838
Virginia 13th	John M. Patton (D)	Resigned April 7, 1838	Linn Banks (D)	Seated April 28, 1838
Alabama 3rd	Joab Lawler (W)	Died May 8, 1838	George W. Crabb (W)	Seated October 5, 1835
Ohio 19th	Daniel Kilgore (D)	Resigned July 4, 1838	Henry Swearingen (D)	Seated December 3, 1838
Ohio 16th	Elisha Whittlesey (W)	Resigned July 9, 1838	Joshua R. Giddings (W)	Seated December 3, 1838
New York 22nd	Andrew D. Bruyn (D)	Died July 27, 1838	Cyrus Beers (D)	Seated December 3, 1838
New York 29th	William Patterson (W)	Died August 14, 1838	Harvey Putnam (W)	Seated November 7, 1838
Iowa Territory at-large	New seat	Iowa Territory seated its first delegate September 10, 1838	George Wallace Jones (D)	Seated September 10, 1838
Massachusetts 2nd	Stephen C. Phillips (W)	Seat declared vacant September 28, 1838	Leverett Saltonstall (W)	Seated December 15, 1838
Maine 1st	John Fairfield (D)	Resigned December 24, 1838, after being elected Governor of Maine	Vacant	Not filled this congress
Wisconsin Territory at-large	George Wallace Jones (D)	Lost contested election January 14, 1839	James D. Doty (D)	Seated January 14, 1839
Louisiana 2nd	Eleazar W. Ripley (D)	Died March 2, 1839	Vacant	Not filled this congress

== Committees ==
Lists of committees and their party leaders.

=== Senate ===
- Agriculture (Chairman: Perry Smith)
- Audit and Control the Contingent Expenses of the Senate (Chairman: Samuel McKean)
- Claims (Chairman: Henry Hubbard)
- Commerce (Chairman: William R. King)
- Danger of Steam Vessels (Select)
- Distributing Public Revenue Among the States (Select)
- District of Columbia (Chairman: William H. Roane)
- Engrossed Bills (Chairman: John Norvell)
- Finance (Chairman: Silas Wright)
- Foreign Relations (Chairman: James Buchanan)
- Indian Affairs (Chairman: Hugh Lawson White)
- Judiciary (Chairman: Felix Grundy)
- Letter of Mr. Ruggles (Select)
- Manufactures (Chairman: John M. Niles)
- Memorial of A. B. Quinby (Select)
- Memorial of the Citizens of Georgetown (DC) for the Retrocession of that Part of the District (Select)
- Memorial of Duff Green (Select)
- Memorial of Edward D. Tippett (Select)
- Mileage of Members of Congress (Select)
- Military Affairs (Chairman: Thomas Hart Benton)
- Militia (Chairman: Clement C. Clay)
- Naval Affairs (Chairman: William C. Rives)
- Occupation of the Columbia River (Select)
- Oregon Territory (Select)
- Patents and the Patent Office (Chairman: John Ruggles then Robert Strange)
- Pensions (Chairman: Thomas Morris)
- Post Office and Post Roads (Chairman: John M. Robinson)
- Private Land Claims (Chairman: Lewis F. Linn)
- Public Buildings and Grounds (Chairman: N/A)
- Public Lands (Chairman: Robert J. Walker)
- Purchasing Boyd Reilly's Gas Apparatus (Select)
- Revolutionary Claims (Chairman: Bedford Brown)
- Roads and Canals (Chairman: Thomas Tipton)
- Tariff Regulation (Select)
- Whole

=== House of Representatives ===
- Accounts (Chairman: Joseph Johnson)
- Agriculture (Chairman: Edmund Deberry)
- Amendment to the Constitution (Select)
- Claims (Chairman: John Chambers)
- Commerce (Chairman: Samuel Cushman)
- District of Columbia (Chairman: James W. Bouldin)
- Elections (Chairman: Andrew Buchanan)
- Expenditures in the Navy Department (Chairman: John C. Brodhead)
- Expenditures in the Post Office Department (Chairman: Timothy Childs)
- Expenditures in the State Department (Chairman: Mathias Morris)
- Expenditures in the Treasury Department (Chairman: Heman Allen)
- Expenditures in the War Department (Chairman: William K. Clowney)
- Expenditures on Public Buildings (Chairman: Samuel T. Sawyer)
- Foreign Affairs (Chairman: Benjamin C. Howard)
- Indian Affairs (Chairman: John Bell)
- Invalid Pensions (Chairman: William Taylor)
- Judiciary (Chairman: Francis Thomas)
- Manufactures (Chairman: John Quincy Adams)
- Mileage (Chairman: William C. Dawson)
- Military Affairs (Chairman: James I. McKay)
- Militia (Chairman: David D. Wagener)
- Naval Affairs (Chairman: Samuel Ingham)
- Patents (Chairman: Isaac Fletcher)
- Post Office and Post Roads (Chairman: Henry W. Connor)
- Private Land Claims (Chairman: William L. May)
- Public Buildings and Grounds (Chairman: Levi Lincoln Jr.)
- Public Expenditures (Chairman: Elisha Haley)
- Public Lands (Chairman: Ratliff Boon until 1838, then Zadok Casey)
- Revisal and Unfinished Business (Chairman: Matthias Shepler)
- Revolutionary Claims (Chairman: Robert Craig)
- Revolutionary Pensions (Chairman: William S. Morgan)
- Roads and Canals (Chairman: Charles F. Mercer)
- Rules (Select)
- Standards of Official Conduct
- Territories (Chairman: Isaac H. Bronson)
- Ways and Means (Chairman: Churchill C. Cambreleng)
- Whole

=== Joint committees ===
- Enrolled Bills
- The Library

== Employees ==
- Librarian of Congress: John Silva Meehan

=== Senate ===
- Chaplain: John R. Goodman (Episcopalian), until September 11, 1837
  - Henry Slicer (Methodist), elected September 11, 1837
- Secretary: Asbury Dickins
- Sergeant at Arms: John Shackford (died)
  - Stephen Haight, elected September 4, 1837

=== House of Representatives ===
- Chaplain: Septimus Tustin (Presbyterian), elected September 4, 1837
  - Levi R. Reese (Methodist), elected December 4, 1837
- Clerk: Walter S. Franklin, until September 20, 1838 (died)
  - Hugh A. Garland, elected December 3, 1838
- Doorkeeper: Overton Carr
- Postmaster: William J. McCormick
- Sergeant at Arms: Roderick Dorsey

== See also ==
- 1836 United States elections (elections leading to this Congress)
  - 1836 United States presidential election
  - 1836–37 United States Senate elections
  - 1836–37 United States House of Representatives elections
- 1838 United States elections (elections during this Congress, leading to the next Congress)
  - 1838–39 United States Senate elections
  - 1838–39 United States House of Representatives elections
