= Jack Emanuel =

Australian official in New Guinea (1918–1971)

Jack Emanuel GC
- Born: Errol John Emanuel; 13 December 1918; Enfield, New South Wales, Australia
- Died: 19 August 1971 (aged 52); Kabaira plantation, Territory of Papua and New Guinea
- Occupation: District commissioner in New Guinea
- Known for: Local administration
- Awards: George Cross (1972)

Errol John Emanuel GC (13 December 1918 – 19 August 1971) was an Australian colonial administrator who served as district commissioner in the East New Britain district of Papua New Guinea. He was posthumously awarded the George Cross, the highest British (and Commonwealth) award for bravery out of combat, for gallantry displayed between July 1969 and 19 August 1971. Emanuel served as a police officer and fireman in Australia before accepting a posting as patrol officer (kiap) to the Australian-administered United Nations trust territory of New Guinea, shortly after the Second World War. Emanuel was appointed acting district commissioner for East New Britain in 1969, and was confirmed in this role in 1971. He was well-respected as a local government official and noted for his willingness to negotiate resolutions to local disputes without police escort. Emanuel was trying to discuss a resolution to a land dispute between European settlers and the Tolai people in August 1971 when he was stabbed to death during negotiations. His killers were brought to trial and his death shocked the Tolai who largely abandoned the dispute.

== Early life ==
Errol John Emanuel (Note: His surname is given as "Emmanuel" in the Australian Quarterly (1972); Clark (1973); Todd (1974); Mamak & Bedford (1974); Time and Tide (1978); Griffin, Nelson and Firth (1979) and Thompson (2014). In all other sources cited, including official records such as the London Gazette, where his surname is used it is given as "Emanuel".) was born on 13 December 1918, in Enfield, New South Wales. He was the son of Robert and Elsie Emanuel and went by the name of Jack. Emanuel attended school in Sydney and joined the New South Wales Police Force in June 1940. In 1941, he joined the New South Wales Fire Brigades. Emanuel applied to the Department of External Territories in September 1944 for a posting with the New Guinea Police Force but was told that civil administration in the Territory of New Guinea (modern-day Papua New Guinea), which was a League of Nations mandate of Australia, had ceased following the 1942 Japanese invasion. He married Alma May Brown in Bankstown on 7 October 1944, they had one son and one daughter.

== New Guinea ==
=== Patrol officer and assistant district commissioner ===
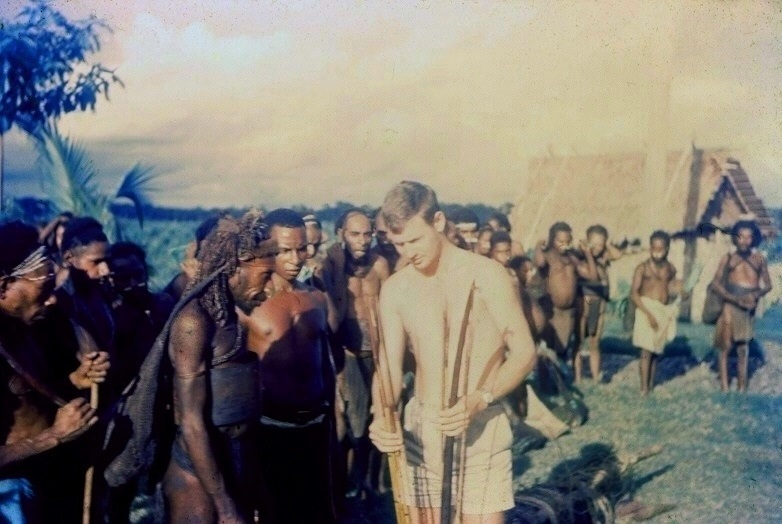
A kiap, pictured in 1964

After the Second World War ended in 1945, Emanuel applied again for a posting to New Guinea, which soon became a United Nations trust territory of Australia. He was accepted and joined the force on 24 August 1946 as a patrol officer (known locally as a kiap). The kiap was the principal officer of local government in the territory, which lacked a representative legislature. They were responsible for a wide variety of roles concerned with governing the local people. They acted as magistrates, police officers, surveyors, census takers, health officers, and construction supervisors. Between 1956 and 1965 Emanuel was posted to the Gazelle Peninsula in northeastern East New Britain as assistant district commissioner and became fluent in the language of the local Tolai people.

Many of the people of the territory were hostile to the Australian administration; Emanuel's district included around 70,000 members of the Tolai people, who were particularly opposed to Australian rule. Since their first contact with Europeans in the 1870s, some 40% of Tolai land had been allocated for use as plantations and by the 1960s population growth increased pressure on the remaining land. Some of the Tolai leaders objected to the new councils established by the Australians to administer the territory, viewing them as undermining their authority.

The introduction of the Personal Tax in 1957, applying to all males over the age of 18, also inflamed local opinion. In August 1958 during a visit by Emanuel to Navuneram to enforce the tax, a violent confrontation erupted. In an attempted show of force, Emanuel fired his pistol into the air; the Royal Papua New Guinea Constabulary contingent were also ordered, not by Emanuel, to fire above the villagers' heads. Some shots hit the villagers and two were killed.

The American missionary G. T. Bustin recalled meeting Emanuel in his 1959 autobiography Gospel Trail Blazing. He noted "I have never before met an officer who is the equal of Jack Emanuel. He never raises his voice when dealing with these people. He quietly slips among them and has them drop their spears and unstring their bows. He is always kind even when he has to be stern. He loves these poor people of the bush". Alma worked as a nurse in the Rabaul Infant Welfare Clinic. She died on 18 June 1965 and a group of the Tolai attended her funeral. Emanuel afterward married Ellen Agnes and had a third child.

=== District commissioner ===
Violence again flared in 1969 when the Australians decided the Gazelle Peninsula Native Local Government Council should consist of representatives from other peoples, as well as the Tolai. In July 1969, Emanuel was appointed acting district commissioner for the East New Britain portion of the recently united Territory of Papua and New Guinea, this was a more senior role but again with a wide range of local government administration responsibilities. Emanuel, based in Rabaul, was given the particular task to reduce conflict and restore local government in the Gazelle Peninsula. In November around 7,000 Tolai protested on the streets of Rabaul. Emanuel complained that the British-Austrian anthropologist T. Scarlett Epstein, an advisor to a government commission into the disturbances, had been "stirring" the Tolai in his district. Epstein had attended an anti-council meeting of Tolai from which government representatives had been excluded; she was afterwards recalled to Australia by the administrator of the territory, David Hay, at the request of commission head Peter Connolly.

Emanuel was appointed to the district commissioner role full-time in 1971. Under Emanuel, who was liberal in outlook and well-liked by those living in his district, the Gazelle Peninsula achieved one of the highest literacy rates in the territory. He often travelled alone to meet with residents at night time in an attempt to build trust, despite receiving frequent death threats from anti-government factions. Emanuel often placed himself at the scenes of confrontations between the police and residents of his district; he frequently left the safety of the police lines to meet with aggrieved parties to discuss an alternative to bloodshed.

=== Death ===
The Tolai had a long-standing dispute with European settlers over a cocoa plantation on the Gazelle Peninsula. They considered that they were entitled to compensation from the authorities for land taken from them and to a share of the profits from the Tolai Cocoa Project. A group of Tolai had previously attempted to take over a cocoa fermentary by force.

On 19 August 1971, a group of Tolai in war paint assembled at Kabaira plantation on the Gazelle Peninsula and were confronted by the police. Emanuel was invited by some of the Tolai to discuss the dispute and he accompanied them into the bush. Here, shortly after beginning negotiations, he was fatally stabbed with a Second World War Japanese bayonet. Emanuel staggered back towards the police lines but collapsed and died before reaching them.

=== Trial of murderers ===
In the aftermath of the killing, police patrols were increased in the Kabaira area. Villagers, including the elderly, women and children, were beaten, gardens deliberately trampled and pigs killed. The police brought in many villagers for questioning and some were tortured; at the subsequent trial, the Chief Justice of the territory refused to admit some confessions into evidence because of this. The offices of the Motaungan Association, which advocated for native rights, were raided. Despite the association having tried to dissuade the residents of Kabaira from violence, its leader, Joseph ToGigie, was arrested on suspicion of murder. ToGigie was charged under rarely used laws that allowed the leaders of organisations to be indicted ex officio for crimes committed by their members. A magistrate later dismissed the charges as there was no actual evidence of ToGigie's involvement in the crime.

The police indicted 21 Tolai men for offences related to the death of Emmanuel. The territory's Department of Law, whose officers read the police reports, recommended that only five men should face charges for the murder but the Australian government insisted that a larger number be tried. Some Europeans resident in the territory as well as some native inhabitants, particularly from the Highland regions, expressed the view that those accused should face summary execution without trial.

Thirteen of the men were brought to trial at the Supreme Court (Note: The Supreme Court was the superior criminal court in the territory. In spite of its name, it was not a court of final appeal; at the time of the trial, appeals were made to the Full Court of the Supreme Court then to the High Court of Australia and, ultimately, to the Judicial Committee of the Privy Council. The Supreme Court is analogous to the National Court in post-independence Papua New Guinea, rather than the Supreme Court of Papua New Guinea which is a court of final appeal.) in Rabaul in January 1972; the charges of four of the men were dismissed at the start of the proceedings. As the men's defences might result in them implicating each other they were entitled to separate representation and each was provided with a lawyer; eight public solicitors and eight barristers (including two Queen's Counsel, QCs) were provided by legal aid. Additionally, funding by public collection across Australia allowed two of the men to be represented privately and a Melbourne-based QC and a Brisbane-based junior barrister travelled to Raboul to represent their clients. They later withdrew from the case as the funding ran out. The prosecution case was made by a Brisbane-based QC and three legal officers. Many of the lawyers involved in the case had to be brought from Australia due to a lack of qualified people in the territory.

The trial heard that one of the leaders of the Tolai, William Taupa, had decided that the land dispute could only be brought to a resolution by the death of a kiap. There was also suspicion that Emanuel had been targeted because of his involvement in the 1958 incident at Navuneram. After an unusually long trial (it had been expected to last three weeks), on 20 June Taupa and one other were convicted of murder. Three of the others on trial were found guilty of being accessories and the remaining defendants found not guilty. Charges against the other eight men, not yet brought to trial, were dropped. The men convicted received sentences of imprisonment ranging from 18 months to 15 years. The Australian administration considered imposing collective punitive measures against the Tolai, but decided against this course.

The trial was reported to have cost around AU$250,000 (equivalent to $2,893,180 in 2022), but may have been up to double that. The cost of the trial was borne by the general budget of the territory, to the detriment of other public spending. The case raised questions as to whether the British-style legal system was suited to the administration of territories in the developing world. Australian legal writer Jack Goldring, writing in 1972, thought the right to a fair trial required the system for serious offences but that there was a case for summary justice for lower-level offences to ease pressures on the limited funds available for administering the territory. The trial also brought public attention to the behaviour of officers of the Royal Papua New Guinea Constabulary, particularly with regards to corruption and abuses of power.

== Legacy ==
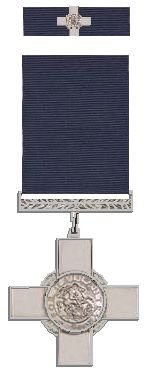
The George Cross

Emanuel's funeral in Rabaul was attended by around 10,000 people. Just weeks after the murder Papuan socialist revolutionary John Kasaipwalova, in a speech to students in Lae, described Emanuel's murder as "payback" for "a White man who [terrorized] native people" and encouraged Papuans to "rejoice at his death". The Tolai people were generally shocked by the murder and the incident led to them largely abandoning the land protest movement. The territory received self-government in 1973 and in 1975 became the independent country of Papua New Guinea.

Emanuel was awarded the George Cross, the highest British and Commonwealth award for bravery out of combat, for gallantry displayed between July 1969 and 19 August 1971. The award was notified in the London Gazette of 1 February 1972. Ellen declined a formal presentation and received the award in the post, dispatched on 29 March 1972. The medal later came into the ownership of the government of Papua New Guinea and was sold in 1978 for £3,000 (equivalent to £16,395 in 2025); it now forms part of the collection of Michael Ashcroft, Baron Ashcroft. A memorial to Emanuel stands in Canberra, Australia. Papuan musician George Telek and Australian musician David Bridie collaborated on a song about the murder of Emanuel for a 2016 exhibition on the art of Papua New Guinea at the Queensland Art Gallery.
