= Samuel J. Gholson =

American judge (1808–1883)

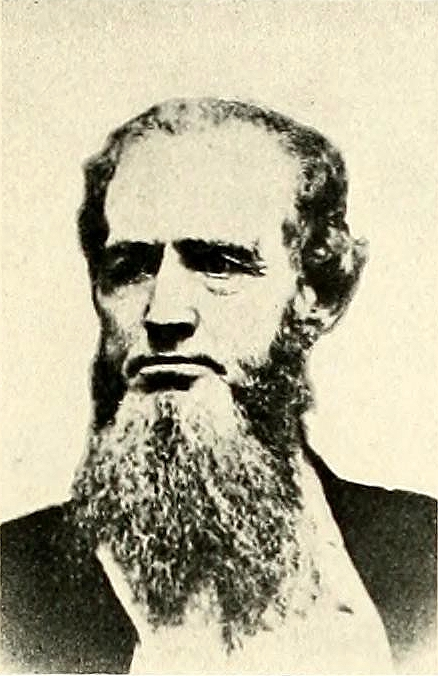

Judge of the United States District Court for the Northern District and the Southern District of Mississippi
- In office February 13, 1839 – January 10, 1861
- Appointed by: Martin Van Buren
- Preceded by: George Adams
- Succeeded by: Robert Andrews Hill

Member of the U.S. House of Representatives from Mississippi's at-large district
- In office December 1, 1836 – February 5, 1838
- Preceded by: David Dickson
- Succeeded by: Thomas J. Word

Speaker of the Mississippi House of Representatives
- In office 1865–1866
- Preceded by: Lock E. Houston
- Succeeded by: F. E. Franklin

Member of the Mississippi House of Representatives from the Monroe County district
- In office January 1878 – January 1880 Serving with N. W. Hatch; Wright Cunningham
- Preceded by: A. J. Sykes; W. W. Troupe; J. M. Trice
- Succeeded by: E. O. Sykes; J. C. Burdine; A. Carter
- In office 1865–1866 Serving with Joel M. Acker
- Preceded by: J. L. Tindall; L. B. Moore
- Succeeded by: William Hodges
- In office 1839 Serving with G. Jowers
- Preceded by: Lemuel Prewett; G. Jowers
- Succeeded by: John R. Greer; Joel M. Acker
- In office 1835–1836 Serving with James McKinney (1836)
- Preceded by: John Bell
- Succeeded by: James McKinney; J. R. Bell

Personal details
- Born: Samuel Jameson Gholson; May 19, 1808 Richmond, Kentucky, U.S.
- Died: October 16, 1883 (aged 75) Aberdeen, Mississippi, U.S.
- Resting place: Odd Fellows Cemetery; Aberdeen, Mississippi, U.S.
- Party: Democratic
- Education: read law

Samuel Jameson Gholson (May 19, 1808 – October 16, 1883) was a United States representative from Mississippi, a United States district judge of the United States District Court for the Northern District of Mississippi and the United States District Court for the Southern District of Mississippi and a General in the Confederate States Army.

== Education and career ==
Born on May 19, 1808, near Richmond in Madison County, Kentucky, Gholson moved with his father to Franklin County, Alabama and attended the common schools. He read law and was admitted to the bar at Russellville, Alabama in 1829. He entered private practice in Athens, Monroe County, Mississippi from 1830 to 1839. He was a member of the Mississippi House of Representatives from 1835 to 1836, and in 1839.

== Congressional service ==
Gholson was elected as a Jacksonian Democrat (now Democrat) from Mississippi's at-large congressional district to the United States House of Representatives of the 24th United States Congress to fill the vacancy caused by the death of United States Representative David Dickson and served from December 1, 1836, to March 3, 1837. He presented credentials as a Democratic member-elect to the 25th United States Congress and served from July 18, 1837, until February 5, 1838, when the seat was declared vacant.

== Federal judicial service ==
Gholson was nominated by President Martin Van Buren on February 9, 1839, to a joint seat on the United States District Court for the Northern District of Mississippi and the United States District Court for the Southern District of Mississippi vacated by Judge George Adams. He was confirmed by the United States Senate on February 13, 1839, and received his commission the same day. His service terminated on January 10, 1861, due to his resignation upon the secession of Mississippi from the Union. Gholson was a member of the Mississippi secession convention in January 1861.

=== Other service ===
Concurrent with his federal judicial service, Gholson served in the Mississippi State Militia as a lieutenant in 1846.

== Later career and death ==
During the American Civil War, Gholson served in the Confederate States Army as a private, captain, colonel, and brigadier general, and as a major general of Mississippi state troops. Gholson initially enlisted as a private, taking part in the battles of Fort Donelson, Iuka, and Corinth in 1862. In the spring of 1863 he was appointed as major general of the Mississippi State Troops, and the following year was commissioned as a brigadier general of Confederate cavalry transferred from state service. Gholson was severely wounded in the December 1864 Battle of Egypt Station, and lost his right arm. After the war, he was a member of the Mississippi House of Representatives from 1865 to 1866, and in 1878. He was its Speaker in the 1865-1866 session, the last session before 1870. He resumed private practice in Aberdeen, Mississippi from 1866 to 1878, and from 1878 to 1883. He died on October 16, 1883, in Aberdeen. He was interred in Odd Fellows Cemetery in Aberdeen.

== See also ==
- List of American Civil War generals (Confederate)

== Sources ==
- Eicher, John H., and David J. Eicher, Civil War High Commands. Stanford: Stanford University Press, 2001. ISBN 978-0-8047-3641-1.
- Sifakis, Stewart. Who Was Who in the Civil War. New York: Facts On File, 1988. ISBN 978-0-8160-1055-4.
- United States Congress. "Samuel J. Gholson (id: G000149)". Biographical Directory of the United States Congress.
- Warner, Ezra J. (1959). Generals in Gray: Lives of the Confederate Commanders (1st ed.). Baton Rouge: Louisiana State University Press. OCLC 445052.

U.S. House of Representatives
Preceded by David Dickson	Member of the U.S. House of Representatives from Mississippi's at-large congressional district 1836–1837	Succeeded by himself
Preceded by himself	Member of the U.S. House of Representatives from Mississippi's at-large congressional district 1837–1838	Succeeded by Thomas J. Word
Legal offices
Preceded by George Adams	Judge of the United States District Court for the Northern District of Mississippi; Judge of the United States District Court for the Southern District of Mississippi; 1839–1861	Succeeded by Robert Andrews Hill
