= George Adams (Mississippi judge) =

American judge (1784–1844)

Judge of the United States District Court for the Northern District of Mississippi Judge of the United States District Court for the Southern District of Mississippi
- In office June 18, 1838 – September 30, 1838
- Appointed by: operation of law
- Preceded by: Seat established by 5 Stat. 247
- Succeeded by: Samuel J. Gholson

Judge of the United States District Court for the District of Mississippi
- In office January 20, 1836 – June 18, 1838
- Appointed by: Andrew Jackson
- Preceded by: Powhatan Ellis
- Succeeded by: Seat abolished

Personal details
- Born: George Adams; August 1, 1784 Lynchburg, Virginia
- Died: August 14, 1844 (aged 60) Jackson, Mississippi, U.S.
- Children: William Wirt Adams; Daniel Weisiger Adams
- Education: read law

George Adams (August 1, 1784 – August 14, 1844) was a United States district judge of the United States District Court for the District of Mississippi, the United States District Court for the Northern District of Mississippi and the United States District Court for the Southern District of Mississippi.

== Education and career ==
Born on August 1, 1784, in Lynchburg, Virginia, Adams read law in 1810. He entered private practice in Frankfort, Kentucky from 1810 to 1825. He was a member of the Kentucky House of Representatives from 1810 to 1811, and in 1814. He resumed private practice in Natchez, Mississippi from 1825 to 1827, and from 1829 to 1830. He was Attorney General of Mississippi from 1828 to 1829. He was the United States Attorney for the District of Mississippi from 1830 to 1836.

== Federal judicial service ==
Adams was nominated by President Andrew Jackson on January 12, 1836, to a seat on the United States District Court for the District of Mississippi vacated by Judge Powhatan Ellis. He was confirmed by the United States Senate on January 20, 1836, and received his commission the same day. Adams was reassigned by operation of law to the United States District Court for the Northern District of Mississippi and the United States District Court for the Southern District of Mississippi on June 18, 1838, to a new joint seat authorized by 5 Stat. 247. His service terminated on September 30, 1838, due to his resignation.

== Later career and death ==
Following his resignation from the federal bench, Adams resumed private practice in Jackson, Mississippi from 1838 to 1844. He died on August 14, 1844, in Jackson.

== Family ==
Two of Adams' sons were Generals in the Confederate Armies: William Wirt Adams and Daniel Weisiger Adams.

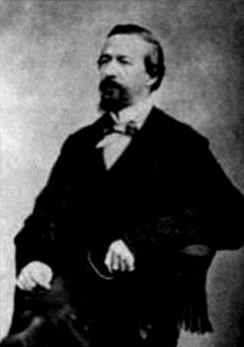
William Wirt Adams
1819–1888

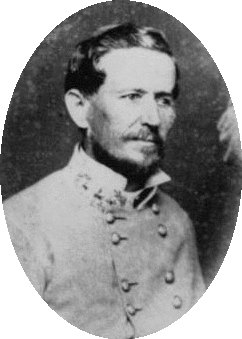
Daniel Weisiger Adams 1821–1872

== Sources ==
Legal offices
Preceded by Powhatan Ellis	Judge of the United States District Court for the District of Mississippi; 1836–1838	Succeeded by Seat abolished
Preceded by Seat established by 5 Stat. 247	Judge of the United States District Court for the Northern District of Mississippi; Judge of the United States District Court for the Southern District of Mississippi; 1838	Succeeded by Samuel J. Gholson
