= Joel M. Acker =

Former Mississippi politician

Member of the Mississippi State Senate from the Monroe County district
- In office 1854 – July 1856
- Preceded by: J. Y. Thompson
- Succeeded by: Benjamin Bradford
- In office 1846
- Preceded by: J. Y. Thompson
- Succeeded by: James E. Harrison

Member of the Mississippi House of Representatives from the Monroe County district
- In office 1865–1866
- In office 1840–1844

Personal details
- Born: March 15, 1815 Anderson County, South Carolina, U.S.
- Died: December 5, 1892 (aged 77) Aberdeen, Mississippi, U.S.
- Party: Democratic

Joel Milton Acker (March 15, 1815 - December 5, 1892) was an American lawyer, planation owner, politician, and jurist. He represented Monroe County in the Mississippi State Senate in 1846 and from 1854 to 1856. He also represented the county in the Mississippi House of Representatives from 1840 to 1844 and from 1865 to 1866.

== Life and career ==
Joel Milton Acker was born in Pendleton DIstrict, Anderson County, South Carolina, on March 15, 1815. He was the fifth-born son of the six sons and six daughters of Pennsylvania-born Peter Acker, who was of German descent, and Virginia-born Susanna Halbert Acker, who was of Welsh descent. Acker attended the Fairview Academy in Greenville District. He then attended Yale University as a sophomore and graduated in 1836. After graduation, he briefly returned to South Carolina before moving to Athens, Mississippi in December 1836. Shortly after moving to Athens, Acker opened a law practice there. In 1846, Acker moved from Athens to Aberdeen, Mississippi, in the same county. Sometime before his death, Acker became the vice-president of Aberdeen's First National Bank. He also was a plantation owner and owned large amounts of real estate in Monroe County.

=== Political and military career ===
In 1839, Acker was elected to represent Monroe County in the Mississippi House of Representatives for the 1840 and 1841 sessions. He was re-elected in 1841 and served in the 1842 and 1844 sessions. In 1845, Acker was elected to represent the county in the Mississippi State Senate, and served in the 1846 session. In the winter of 1846–1847, Acker resigned in order to fight in the Mexican-American War. Acker organized Company D of the Second Mississippi Volunteers and became its Captain. His war service ended in May 1848 and he continued practicing law. Acker was re-elected to the Mississippi State Senate in 1855, and served in the 1856 session. He resigned from the State Senate in July 1856 when he was elected State Circuit Court Judge of the Ninth Judicial District. Acker was re-elected as Judge in 1858 and served until 1863. At the beginning of the US Civil War, Acker was appointed to serve on the staff of a General Harris, but did not leave Monroe County. After the Civil War ended, Acker continued practicing law, and was also entrusted by Governor Benjamin G. Humphreys to be an envoy to President Andrew Johnson. In 1865, Acker was once again elected to the House where he served in the 1865-1866 session. In the 1876 presidential election, Acker was chosen as a presidential elector for Democratic candidate Samuel J. Tilden.

Acker died "suddenly and unexpectedly" at his Aberdeen home on the night of December 5–6, 1892, and was buried in the local Odd Fellows' cemetery "with Masonic honors". Aberdeen's First National Bank temporarily closed in his memory.

== Personal life ==
Acker was a Freemason. In 1858, Acker married Martha Harris in Columbus, Mississippi. They had two surviving children: James M. Acker, who graduated from the University of Mississippi in 1881 and followed his father into law, and Corrinne Acker, who graduated from Sewanee. Corinne married Francis Marion Rogers of Aberdeen on December 9, 1883.
