= Robert W. Roberts =

American politician

Member of the U.S. House of Representatives from Mississippi's at-large district
- In office March 4, 1843 – March 3, 1847
- Preceded by: Seat created
- Succeeded by: Seat eliminated

19th Speaker of the Mississippi House of Representatives
- In office 1842–1843
- Preceded by: James Alexander Ventress
- Succeeded by: J. L. Totten

Member of the Mississippi House of Representatives
- In office 1838–1844

Personal details
- Born: Robert Whyte Roberts; November 28, 1784 Kent County, Delaware, U.S.
- Died: January 4, 1865 (aged 80) near Hillsboro, Mississippi, U.S.
- Party: Democratic
- Profession: Politician, lawyer

Robert Whyte Roberts (November 28, 1784 – January 4, 1865) was a U.S. representative from Mississippi.

Born in Kent County, Delaware, Roberts received a liberal education. He studied law. He was admitted to the bar. Shortly after reaching his majority moved to Tennessee, where he was elected a circuit judge. He moved to Limestone County, Alabama in 1822, and to Scott County, Mississippi, in 1826, and settled near Hillsboro. He engaged in agricultural pursuits. He commenced the practice of law in Hillsboro. Circuit judge of Scott County 1830–1838. He served as member of the State house of representatives 1838–1844 and served as speaker in 1842 and 1843.

Roberts was elected as a Democrat to the Twenty-eighth and Twenty-ninth Congresses (March 4, 1843 – March 3, 1847). He resumed the practice of law. He also engaged in planting. He died on his plantation, "Long Avenue," near Hillsboro, Mississippi, January 4, 1865. He was interred in a private cemetery on the Roberts plantation.

U.S. House of Representatives
Preceded by Seat established	Member of the U.S. House of Representatives from Mississippi's at-large congressional district 1843 – 1847	Succeeded by Seat eliminated
