= Hillsboro, Mississippi =

- Census-designated place & Unincorporated community (CDP)
- Location within Mississippi Location within the United States
- Coordinates: 32°27′34″N 89°30′41″W
- Country: United States
- State: Mississippi
- County: Scott

Area
  - Total: 9.16 sq mi (23.72 km^{2})
  - Land: 9.14 sq mi (23.67 km^{2})
  - Water: 0.019 sq mi (0.05 km^{2})
- Elevation: 436 ft (133 m)

Population (2020)
  - Total: 1,072
  - Density: 117.3/sq mi (45.28/km^{2})
- Time zone: UTC-6 (Central (CST))
  - Summer (DST): UTC-5 (CDT)
- ZIP code: 39087
- Area codes: 601 & 769
- GNIS feature ID: 693484

Hillsboro is an unincorporated community and census-designated place (CDP) in Scott County, Mississippi, United States. As of the 2020 census, Hillsboro had a population of 1,072. Hillsboro has a post office with ZIP code 39087.

== History ==
Hillsboro is named for its location on a hill above the surrounding area. The community was formed in 1835 and was the county seat of Scott County from 1836 to 1856. Hillsboro formerly had a newspaper, The Argus.

In 1900 Hillsboro had a population of 112, two churches, and four stores.

== Demographics ==
Historical population
Census	Pop.	Note	%±
2010	1,130		—
2020	1,072		−5.1%
U.S. Decennial Census

Hillsboro first appeared as a census designated place in the 2010 U.S. census.

=== Racial and ethnic composition ===
Hillsboro CDP, Mississippi – Racial and ethnic composition Note: the US Census treats Hispanic/Latino as an ethnic category. This table excludes Latinos from the racial categories and assigns them to a separate category. Hispanics/Latinos may be of any race.
Race / Ethnicity (NH = Non-Hispanic)	Pop 2010	Pop 2020	% 2010	% 2020
White alone (NH)	397	339	35.13%	31.62%
Black or African American alone (NH)	685	645	60.62%	60.17%
Native American or Alaska Native alone (NH)	0	0	0.00%	0.00%
Asian alone (NH)	10	1	0.88%	0.09%
Native Hawaiian or Pacific Islander alone (NH)	0	0	0.00%	0.00%
Other race alone (NH)	2	3	0.18%	0.28%
Mixed race or Multiracial (NH)	13	34	1.15%	3.17%
Hispanic or Latino (any race)	23	50	2.04%	4.66%
Total	1,130	1,072	100.00%	100.00%

=== 2020 census ===
As of the 2020 United States census, there were 1,072 people, 357 households, and 213 families residing in the CDP.

== Education ==
Most of Hillsboro is in the Forest Municipal School District while a portion is in the Scott County School District.

East Central Community College covers Scott County, and operates the Forest/Scott County Career-Technical Center in Forest.

== Notable people ==
- G. T. Bustin, preacher and evangelist
- Eddie Futch, boxing trainer
- Fanny Chambers Gooch, author
- Thomas Monroe Henry, state auditor of Mississippi from 1904 to 1908 and insurance commissioner of Mississippi from 1908 until 1928
- Paul B. Johnson Sr., Governor of Mississippi from 1940 to 1943
- Robert W. Roberts, member of the United States House of Representatives from 1843 to 1847
