= J. L. Totten =

American politician

Speaker of the Mississippi House of Representatives
- In office 1844–1846
- Preceded by: R. W. Roberts
- Succeeded by: James Whitfield

Member of the Mississippi House of Representatives from Marshall County
- In office 1844–1848

Member of the Tennessee Senate representing Gibson County, Carroll County and Dyer County
- In office 1835–1837

Sheriff of Carroll County
- In office 1822–1832

Personal details
- Born: 1803 or 1804 Tennessee, U. S.
- Party: Democratic

James L. Totten was an American politician who served as the Speaker of the Mississippi House of Representatives between 1844 and 1846.

James L. Totten was born in 1803 or 1804 in Tennessee.

Totten served as the sheriff of Carroll County, Tennessee between 1822 and 1832. Between 1825 and 1831, Totten also served as a clerk of the Gibson County Circuit Court. Totten served one term in the Tennessee Senate between 1835 and 1837, representing Dyer, Gibson and Carroll Counties.

He then moved to Holly Springs, Mississippi, and farmed there.

Totten served one term in the Mississippi House of Representatives from 1844 to 1846, representing Marshall County as a Democrat. During the term, Totten served as Speaker of the House. He served a second House term from 1846 to 1848.
