= Fanny Chambers Gooch =

American writer

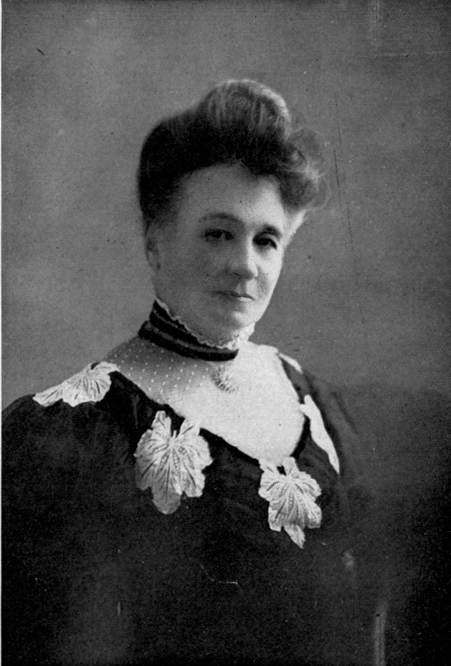
- Occupation: Author

Fanny Chambers Gooch (1849-1913) was an American writer.

== Early life ==
Fanny Chambers Gooch was born in 1849 in Hillsboro, Mississippi, to William and Feriba Chambers. She spent most of her life in Texas. She was the eighth of thirteen children.

== Career ==
Through her book Face to Face with the Mexicans (New York, 1887), she became famous. The book describes what happened when she moved to the city of Saltillo, Mexico, completely unaware of Mexican culture.

Returning after some years to her former home in Austin, her descriptions of her Mexican experiences so entertained her friends that she was asked to prepare a series of articles on the subject for a Texas newspaper. She decided to publish her work in book form. She returned to Mexico, where she spent some time in its principal cities, mingling with its people in every station. She went to New York and superintended the publication of the work. The book at once attracted the notice of the leading reviewers and became very successful.

She is also the author of The Boy Captive of the Texas Mier Expedition, The Tradition of Guadalupe and Christmas in Old Mexico and Christmas in Old Mexico. The Quarterly of the Texas State Historical Association wrote that Christmas in Old Mexico was an "interesting and instructive booklet."

In 1911, Volume 80, Part 2 of The Publishers Weekly wrote of The Boy Captive of the Texas Mier Expedition, "The author [Gooch] is an enthusiastic and competent student of the history of Texas and Mexico. She has passed laborious years in the independent investigation of some of the most romantic and significant events in Texas history, and has gathered in her MS. dealings with the Mier expedition, much interesting and original material and has presented this material in her book. The story deals with the life of a real boy. John C. C. Hill, who at the age of thirteen lived through these experiences."

She also contributed one chapter of Mexican recipes (such as tamal de cazuela) to the book Austin's First Cookbook (1891). A total of 89 women contributed the 300 recipes, and Gooch was one of the only ones known to have worked outside her home.

Her work is also excerpted in the 2005 book Mexico Otherwise: Modern Mexico in the Eyes of Foreign Observer.

== Personal life ==
The year following the publication of Face to Face with the Mexicans, Gooch married Dr. D. T. Iglehart, of Austin.

She died in 1931. (Austin American, October 12, 1931)
