= G. T. Bustin =

American cleric

Green Tolbert Bustin (commonly known as G. T. Bustin) (July 22, 1903 – July 22, 1995) was an American preacher, pastor, evangelist and missionary who served successively in the Church of the Nazarene, Pilgrim Holiness Church, and the Immanuel Missionary Church, before founding the Evangelical Bible Mission, a conservative holiness faith mission organization, in 1940. Bustin was a prolific author, credited with writing at least twenty books, including two autobiographies.

== Early life ==
Green Tolbert Bustin (known to his family as Tolbert) was born on his paternal grandparents' farm in Hillsboro, a small village near Forest, Scott County, Mississippi on July 22, 1903 as the elder son of Oscar Percy Bustin (born December 27, 1882, in Hillsboro, Mississippi), a farmer, and his first wife, Francis May "Fannie" Lyle Bustin (born October 19, 1884, in Mississippi). Soon after the birth of his only brother, Robert L. Bustin (born October 13, 1904, in Scott County, Mississippi; died December 30, 1980, in Duval County, Florida), his parents separated, with Fannie taking Robert with her.

By 1908 Oscar and Fannie had divorced, with Fannie marrying Elisha B. Davis (born June 1877 in Mississippi), an insurance agent, with whom she had a daughter, Lotta "Lottie" May Davis (born about December 1908) in Mississippi). By April 1910 they resided in Hattiesburg, Mississippi.

After the departure of his mother, Bustin had little contact with her and his brother. Bustin and his father lived with Bustin's paternal grandparents, Robert Hicks Bustin (born December 17, 1827, in Troup, Georgia) and his second wife, Mary A. (born July 1854 in Georgia; died about 1920 in Mississippi) on their farm in Hillsboro. Despite being an invalid, Mary Bustin, whom Bustin called "Mamma", was responsible for raising Bustin.

Bustin was educated in a one-room school house on Bustin Town Hill and was regarded as a good student. In 1920, at the age of 17, Bustin had left school, and worked for several months at his maternal greatuncle's farm in the panhandle of western Texas. While he was working in Texas, Bustin's grandmother died. Soon after, during the winter of 1920-1921, Bustin left Texas to return home to Mississippi. However, not wanting to stay with his father, who had married Alma Myrtle Arthur (born May 6, 1896, in Bastrop, Louisiana; died July 15, 1989, in Gautier, Mississippi) and their infant daughter, Mary B. Bustin (born about February 1920), Bustin accepted an invitation to stay with his estranged mother in Little River, in Mississippi County in the delta country of northeastern Arkansas.

== Conversion and call to ministry ==
Unknown to Bustin, after her separation from Oscar, Fannie had become a "holiness" Christian, and attempted to lead Bustin into a relationship with Christ. In his first autobiography My First Fifty Years (published in 1953), Bustin indicated that he was raised to be godly by his grandmother, but that they believed that one could only ever hope to be one of the Lord's elect and thus could not know whether Christ had died for them and thus be saved. After the death of his grandmother, Bustin admitted that he had strayed from her teachings, even taking up card playing. Seeing Fannie as a "fanatic", Bustin refused to allow her to pray audibly for his conversion and call into the holiness ministry, and after several months left his mother to go "rambling". Several months later Bustin returned briefly to Fannie after promising to do so if God would heal him of a serious illness. In late 1921 Bustin returned home to discover that Fannie was critically ill. Soon after, Bustin was converted, writing in 1953:

During the early part of December of 1921 special meetings were conducted in a country school house. W. M. Lusk was the leading light in this meeting. He looked straight at me while he preached -- even pointed at me, as I supposed -- and uncovered my sins to the extent that I became angry and accused my mother of telling him all about me. This conviction climaxed with my conversion on the 12th day of December. What a change! My friends thought I had lost my senses. One sinning religionist who was a strong believer in unconditional eternal security remarked, "Bustin is a good boy, but he has gone crazy over religion."

In January 1922 Bustin was entirely sanctified and acknowledged a call to become a holiness preacher. Bustin wrote in 1953:

Four weeks after my conversion I was praying in a corn crib loft -- consecrating my heart and life to God. I even promised Him I would be a "holiness preacher," or anything else He wanted me to be if He would fill me with His precious Holy Spirit He answered by fire. The heavenly flame burned upon the altar of my heart, and after nearly thirty-two years it still burns. Praise Him! Praise Him! I did praise Him, and sang hours on end even though I am not a singer. His call was clear. I didn't know all that the future held, but I knew that I must preach the blessed Gospel of complete deliverance, and began to plan accordingly. I knew nothing of how far this call would take me in the years to come. Its joys and sorrows were in the unknown bundle, but I shall have reason to praise Him for ever that I heard His voice and heeded the call.

== Education ==
After several months working, later in 1922 Bustin enrolled as a student at Trevecca College, a Bible Training college operate by the Church of the Nazarene in Nashville, Tennessee. Due to financial limitations, Bustin had to work half his way through school. Two months after Bustin enrolled at Trevecca, his mother died in a hospital in Memphis, Tennessee just before he was able to travel to visit. Just after Fannie's funeral at Lepanto, Arkansas, Bustin rededicated his life to serve God, writing in 1953:

Alone with God on this occasion I pledged my life and service anew to go where He wanted me and to serve Him with all my soul. My last earthly support had slipped away, but I had a feeling that mother's God would see me through.

While at Trevecca, Bustin participated each weekend in religious services. During the summer vacation of 1923 Bustin assisted a husband and wife evangelistic team, but due to their illness was given the responsibility of leading the services and preaching at the concluding evangelistic meetings at Salt Lick, Kentucky. Despite his inexperience, Bustin performed well in his first preaching services and won over many in the initially resistant audience.

During his second and final year at Trevecca College, Bustin continued to hold religious services and preach. After Thanksgiving 1923, Bustin convinced his stepfather to allow his daughter, Lottie May Davis, to enrol at Trevecca also but at Bustin's expense. During the summer of 1924 Bustin preached in services in Tennessee, Arkansas, and Mississippi, including for four weeks at Cookeville, Tennessee, where Bustin later recalled:

[God] graciously answered and gave us one of the finest meetings I had ever witnessed. A large group of young people were brought into the fold during those weeks, and some of these were mightily baptized by the Holy Spirit. One of the number shouted her way into heaven within six weeks.

== Ministry ==
After his summer of preaching, Bustin was offered the pastoral responsibilities for two churches by a district superintendent and a guaranteed salary of $100 a week, however Bustin decided to accept the pastorate at a newly organized church in Columbus, Mississippi with no guaranteed stipend.

== Works ==
=== Autobiographies ===
- 1953. My First Fifty Years. Intercession City, FL. Reprint: Holiness Data Ministry, 1996.
- 1978. My First Seventy-five Years. Florala, AL.
