= Athens, Mississippi =

- Unincorporated community
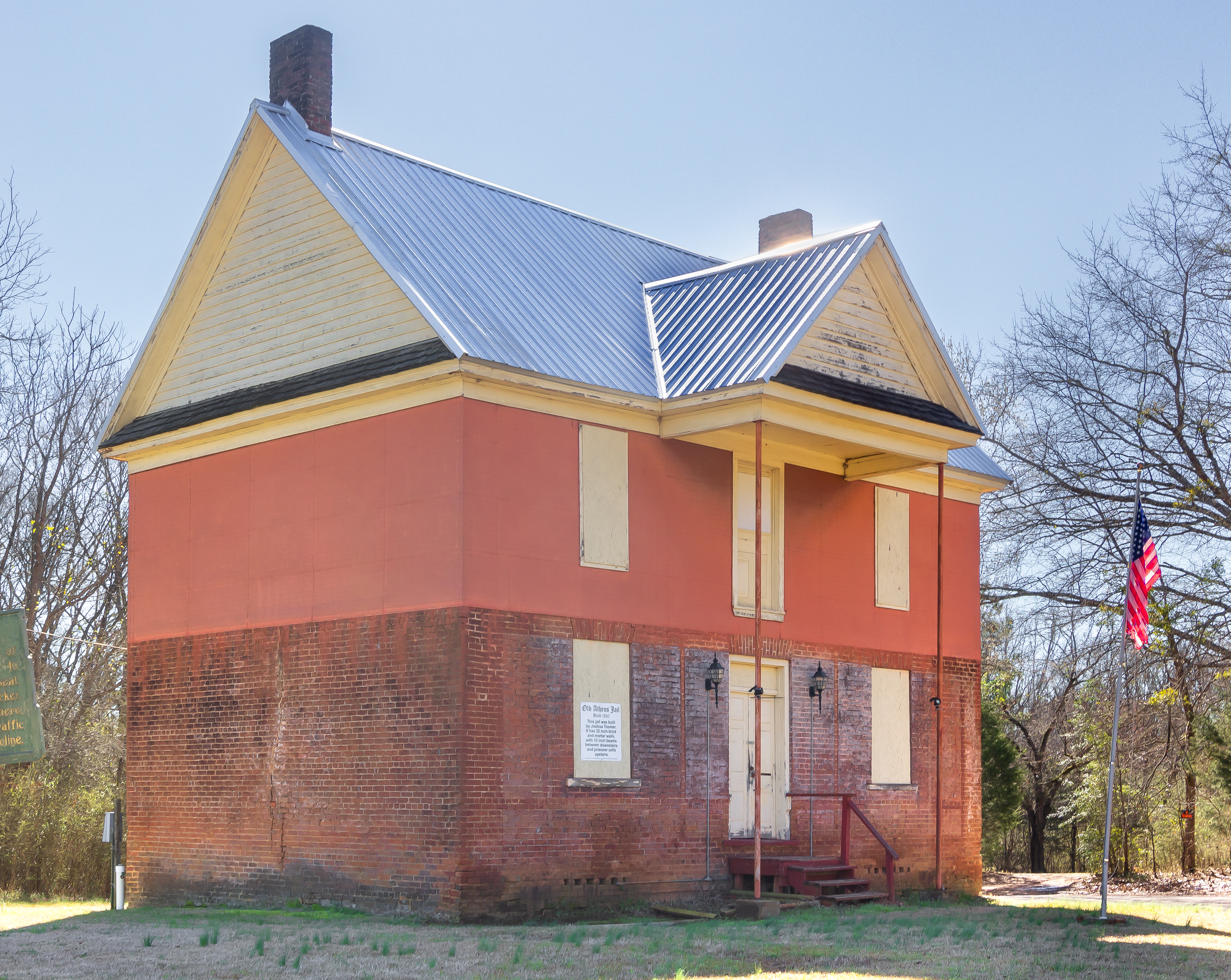
- Former Monroe County Jail (also known as the Athens Jail)

- Location within Mississippi Location within the United States
- Coordinates: 33°52′20″N 88°26′30″W
- Country: United States
- State: Mississippi
- County: Monroe
- Elevation: 302 ft (92 m)
- Time zone: UTC-6 (Central (CST))
  - Summer (DST): UTC-5 (CDT)
- Area code: 662
- GNIS feature ID: 691677

Athens is an unincorporated community in Monroe County, Mississippi.

== History ==
Athens was founded in 1830 and became the second county seat of Monroe County when Monroe County was split to form Lowndes County. Athens was named for the city in Greece, as the community's founders hoped it would become a "city of learning." Athens was located on a stagecoach line that ran from the Natchez District to Eastport.

Athens was once home to six stores, three hotels, two churches, two taverns, and a school. In the 1840s, Athens had a population of 500. In 1849, the courthouse in Athens burned down and by 1857 the county seat was moved west of the Tombigbee River to Aberdeen. After the county seat moved, Athens slowly began to lose its population.

A post office operated under the name Athens from 1830 to 1873.

The former Monroe County Jail (also known as the Athens Jail) was built in 1845 and is the oldest existing public building in Monroe County. It is listed on the National Register of Historic Places.

A historical marker in Athens gives a brief description of its history.

== Notable people ==
- Reuben Davis, United States Congressman and Confederate general
- Samuel J. Gholson, a United States Congressman, judge, and Confederate general
- William Peleg Rogers, lawyer and colonel of the 2nd Texas Infantry Regiment who died at the Second Battle of Corinth
- Tilghman Tucker, Governor of Mississippi from 1842 to 1844
