= Thomas J. Word =

American politician and lawyer (1805–1890)

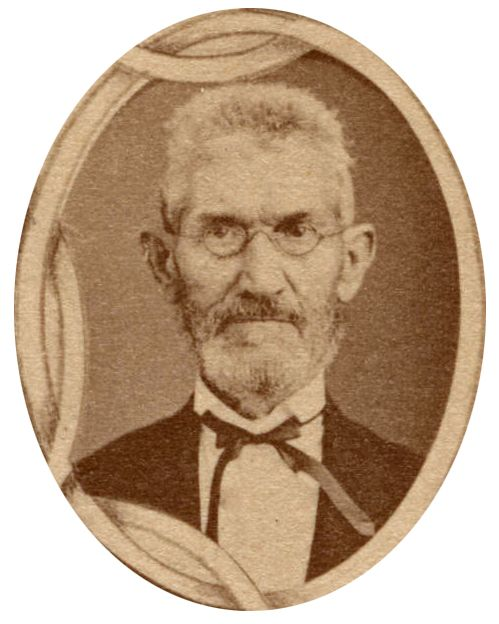

Member of the U.S. House of Representatives from Mississippi's at-large district
- In office May 29, 1838 – March 3, 1839
- Preceded by: Samuel J. Gholson
- Succeeded by: Albert G. Brown

Member of the North Carolina House of Representatives from the Surry County district
- In office 1832–1833

Member of the Texas Senate from the 4th district
- In office January 14, 1873 – January 13, 1874
- Preceded by: Elisha Pettit
- Succeeded by: Winfield Brown Stirman

Personal details
- Born: Thomas Jefferson Word; February 6, 1805 Surry County, North Carolina, US
- Died: May 25, 1890 (aged 85) Palestine, Texas, US
- Party: Whig
- Other political affiliations: Democratic
- Relations: William Faulkner (nephew)
- Profession: Politician, lawyer

Thomas Jefferson Word (February 6, 1805 – May 25, 1890) was an American politician and lawyer. A Whig and later a Democrat, he was a member of the United States House of Representatives from Mississippi. He also served in the North Carolina House of Representatives and the Texas Senate.

== Early life ==
Word was born on February 6, 1805, in Surry County, North Carolina, the son of Thomas Adams Word and Justiana (née Dickerson) Word. He was presumably named for Thomas Jefferson.

== Career ==
By 1827, Word owned 422 acres of land. He later moved to Pontotoc, Mississippi, being admitted to the bar there on November 7, 1836. In the 1840s, he moved to Holly Springs.

Word was a Whig. In 1832 and 1833, he represented Surry County in the North Carolina House of Representatives, during which he served in the Committee on Improvements. He contested the United States House of Representatives election of Samuel J. Gholson, with Word being declared the winner. He served in the House from May 29, 1838, to March 3, 1839, representing Mississippi's at-large district.

Word later moved to Texas. He was a Democratic member of the Texas Senate, from January 14, 1873, to January 13, 1874, representing the 4th district. While serving, he was a member of the Committees on Constitutional Amendments; on Education; on the Judiciary; on the Land Office; on the Penitentiary; on Privileges and Elections; and on State Affairs.

Ideologically, Word leaned conservative. Sources conflict on whether he owned slaves, though he held a states' rights view on the matter, with him representing Marshall County at several pro-slavery conventions.

== Personal life and death ==
Word married Mary E. Word c. 1839; they had three children recorded by the 1850 United States Census. He left the public eye around the mid-1850s. He died on May 25, 1890, aged 85, in Palestine, Texas. His place of burial is unknown. An archive of his papers is held by the East Texas Research Center. He was an uncle of William Faulkner.

U.S. House of Representatives
Preceded by Samuel J. Gholson	Member of the U.S. House of Representatives from Mississippi's at-large congressional district May 29, 1838 – March 3, 1839	Succeeded by Albert G. Brown
