= 1836–37 United States House of Representatives elections =

House elections for the 25th U.S. Congress

- July 4, 1836 – November 7, 1837 (Note: Not including special elections)

All 242 seats in the United States House of Representatives 122 seats needed for a majority
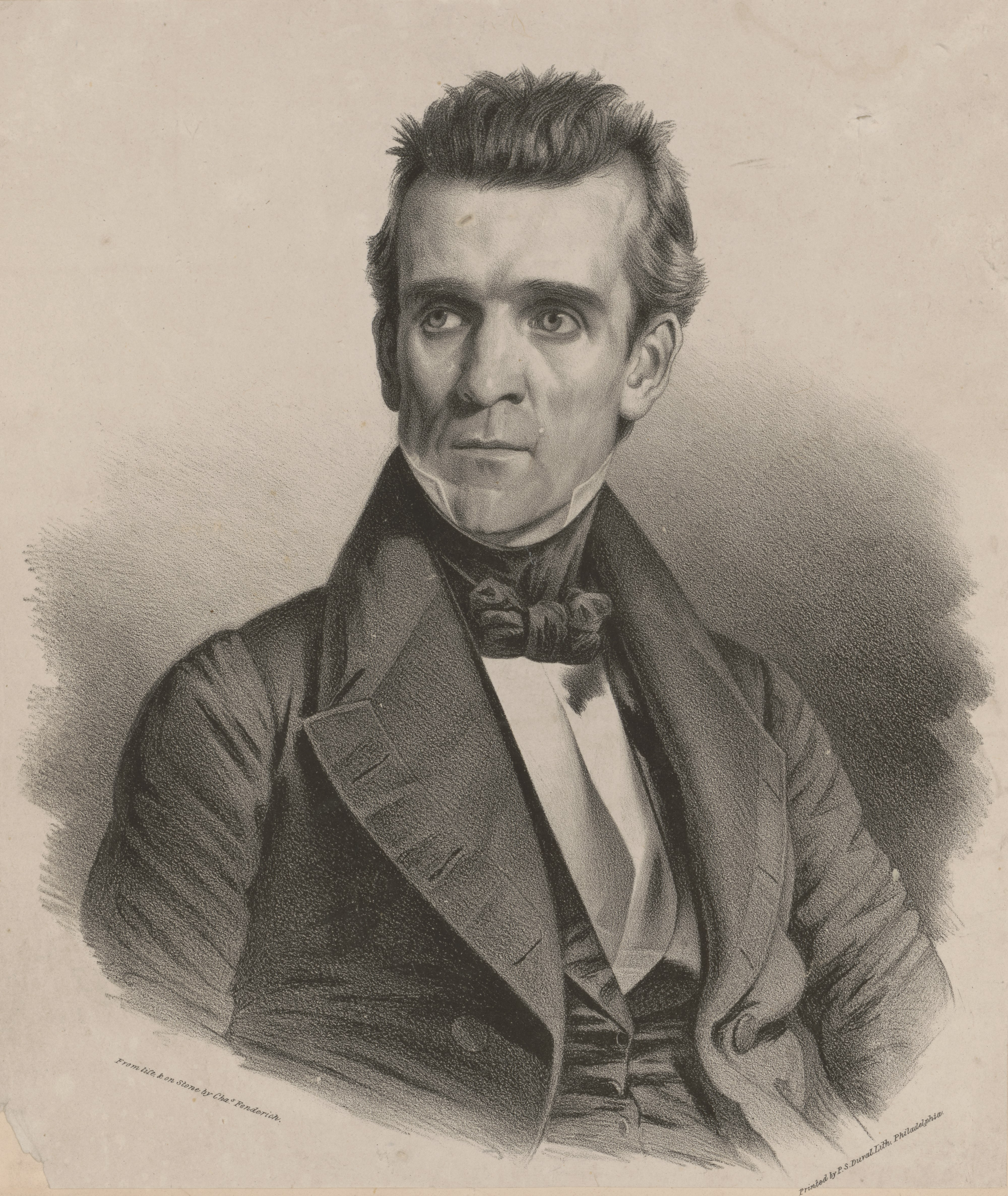

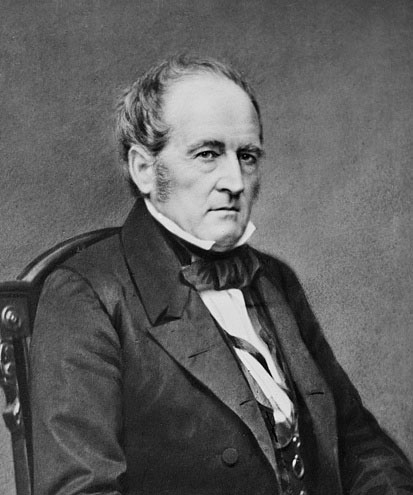
	Majority party	Minority party
Leader	James K. Polk	John Bell
Party	Democratic	Whig
Leader's seat	Tennessee 9th	Tennessee 7th
Last election	143 seats	75 seats
Seats won	128 (Note: Includes 2 seats held by Unionists in South Carolina)	100
Seat change	▼15	▲25
Popular vote	781,142 (Note: Includes 2,763 votes for a Unionist candidate in South Carolina)	723,780
Percentage	50.59%	46.87%
Swing	▲1.08 pp	▲3.39 pp
	Third party	Fourth party
Party	Anti-Masonic	Nullifier
Last election	16 seats	8 seats
Seats won	7	6 (Note: Ran under the Southern Rights label.)
Seat change	▼9	▼2
Popular vote	44,701	3,596
Percentage	2.89%	0.23%
Swing	▼0.10 pp	▼0.98 pp
	Fifth party
Party	Independent
Last election	1 seat
Seats won	1 (Note: Elected as an independent: John Pope, member from Kentucky.)
Seat change	Steady
Popular vote	3,528
Percentage	0.23%
Swing	▼0.76 pp
Speaker before election
James K. Polk
Democratic
Elected Speaker
James K. Polk
Democratic

The 1836–37 United States House of Representatives elections were held on various dates in various states between July 4, 1836, and November 7, 1837. Each state set its own date for its elections to the House of Representatives, either before or after the first session of the 25th United States Congress convened on September 4, 1837. With Arkansas and Michigan officially achieving statehood in 1836 and 1837, respectively, the size of the House was set at 242 seats.

Though Democrat Martin Van Buren was elected president in November 1836, Democrats lost seats. The newly organizing Whigs benefited from regional candidacies and issues and voter fatigue with outgoing two-term President Andrew Jackson. Jackson, a flamboyant public personality with a record of high-profile leadership and historic military success, often clashed with Congress and the Supreme Court. By comparison, Van Buren, a brilliant partisan organizer and political operative, was less charismatic in looks and demeanor. Voter support for the minor Anti-Masonic and Nullifier parties ebbed, but remained significant. One Independent, John Pope, was elected from Kentucky.

== Election summaries ==
↓
128	7	1	6	100
Democratic	AM	I	N	Whig

State	Type	↑ Date	Total seats	Anti-Masonic		Democratic (Note: Previously Jacksonian)		Independent		Nullifier		Whig (Note: Previously National Republican)	
State	Type	↑ Date	Total seats	Seats	Change	Seats	Change	Seats	Change	Seats	Change	Seats	Change
Louisiana	Districts	August 1, 1836	3	0	Steady	1	Steady	0	Steady	0	Steady	2	Steady
Illinois	Districts	August 1, 1836	3	0	Steady	3	Steady	0	Steady	0	Steady	0	Steady
Missouri	At-large	August 1, 1836	2	0	Steady	2	▲1	0	Steady	0	Steady	0	▼1
Vermont	Districts	September 6, 1836	5	0	▼2	1	▲1	0	Steady	0	Steady	4	▲1
Maine	Districts	September 12, 1836	8	0	Steady	6	Steady	0	Steady	0	Steady	2	Steady
Georgia	At-large	October 3, 1836	9	0	Steady	8	▼1	0	Steady	0	Steady	1	▲1
South Carolina	Districts	October 10–11, 1836	9	0	Steady	2	Steady	0	Steady	6	▼1	1	▲1
Ohio	Districts	October 11, 1836	19	0	▼1	8	▼1	0	Steady	0	Steady	11	▲2
Pennsylvania	Districts	October 11, 1836	28	7	▼1	18	▲1	0	Steady	0	Steady	3	Steady
Delaware	At-large	November 8, 1836	1	0	Steady	0	Steady	0	Steady	0	Steady	1	Steady
New York	Districts	November 7–9, 1836	40	0	Steady	30	▼1	0	Steady	0	Steady	10	▲1
Massachusetts	Districts	November 14, 1836	12	0	▼3	2	▲1	0	Steady	0	Steady	10	▲2
New Jersey	At-large	November 16, 1836	6	0	Steady	0	▼6	0	Steady	0	Steady	6	▲6
Late elections (after the March 4, 1837, beginning of the term)
New Hampshire	At-large	March 14, 1837	5	0	Steady	5	Steady	0	Steady	0	Steady	0	Steady
Connecticut	Districts	April 3, 1837	6	0	Steady	6	Steady	0	Steady	0	Steady	0	Steady
Virginia	Districts	April 27, 1837	21	0	Steady	15	▼1	0	Steady	0	Steady	6	▲1
Maryland	Districts	July 26, 1837	8	0	Steady	4	Steady	0	Steady	0	Steady	4	Steady
Tennessee	Districts	August 3, 1837	13	0	Steady	3	▼1	0	Steady	0	Steady	10	▲1
Indiana	Districts	August 7, 1837	7	0	Steady	1	▼5	0	Steady	0	Steady	6	▲5
Kentucky	Districts	August 7, 1837	13	0	Steady	1	▼3	1 (Note: John Pope won as an independent and would run later as a Whig.)	▲1	0	Steady	11	▲2
Alabama	Districts	August 8, 1837	5	0	Steady	3	Steady	0	Steady	0	▼1	2	▲1
North Carolina	Districts	August 10, 1837	13	0	Steady	5	▼2	0	Steady	0	Steady	8	▲2
Michigan	At-large	August 22, 1837	1	0	Steady	1	Steady	0	Steady	0	Steady	0	Steady
Rhode Island	At-large	August 29, 1837	2	0	▼2	0	Steady	0	Steady	0	Steady	2	▲2
Later elections (after the September 4, 1837, beginning of special session)
Arkansas	At-large	October 2, 1837	1	0	Steady	1	Steady	0	Steady	0	Steady	0	Steady
Mississippi	At-large	November 6–7, 1837 (Note: After a disputed result, an April 23–24, 1838 second election confirmed the result of regular election.)	2	0	Steady	0	▼2	0	Steady	0	Steady	2	▲2
Total (Note: Does not include state results listed above due to special election and Independent Representative.)			242	7 2.9%	▼9	128 52.9%	▼15	1 0.4%	▲1	6 2.5%	▼2	100 41.3%	▲25

Popular vote
Democratic	50.95%
Whig	46.50%
Anti-Masonic	3.07%
Nullifier	0.08%
Independents	0.99%

House seats
Democratic	54.55%
Whig	41.32%
Anti-Masonic	2.89%
Nullifier	0.83%
Independents	0.41%

== Special elections ==
There were special elections in 1836 and 1837 to the 24th United States Congress and 25th United States Congress.

Special elections are sorted by date then district.

=== 24th Congress ===
Note: In some sources, parties are listed as "Democrats" and "Whigs." However, they are listed here as "Jacksonian" and "Anti-Jacksonian" (respectively) to conform to the party names as they were regarded during the 24th United States Congress.

District	Incumbent			This race	
District	Member	Party	First elected	Results	Candidates
Connecticut at-large	Zalmon Wildman	Jacksonian	1835	Incumbent died December 10, 1835. New member elected in early 1836 and seated April 29, 1836. Jacksonian hold. Winner later elected to the next term; see below.	▌ ✓ Thomas T. Whittlesey (Jacksonian); [data missing]
Connecticut at-large	Andrew T. Judson	Jacksonian	1835	Incumbent resigned July 4, 1836, to become judge of the U.S. District Court for the District of Connecticut. New member elected in mid-to-late 1836 and seated December 5, 1836. Jacksonian hold. Winner later elected to the next term; see below.	▌ ✓ Orrin Holt (Jacksonian) 51.4%; ▌John Brockway (National Republican) 48.6%
North Carolina 12	James Graham	National; Republican	1833	Seat declared vacant March 29, 1836. Incumbent re-elected August 4, 1836 and seated December 5, 1836. National Republican hold. Incumbent later elected to the next term; see below.	▌ ✓ James Graham (National Republican) 60.13%; ▌David Newland (National Republican) 39.87%
South Carolina 4	James H. Hammond	Nullifier	1834	Incumbent resigned February 26, 1836, due to ill health. New member elected October 10, 1836 and seated December 19, 1836. Nullifier hold. Winner also elected to the next term; see below.	▌ ✓ Franklin H. Elmore (Nullifier) 100%; Uncontested
Pennsylvania 24	John Banks	Anti-Masonic	1830	Incumbent resigned March 31, 1836. New member elected October 11, 1836 and seated December 5, 1836. National Republican gain. Winner was not a candidate for the next term; see below.	▌ ✓ John J. Pearson (National Republican) 57.65%; ▌John Findley (Jacksonian) 42.35%
South Carolina 8	Richard I. Manning	Jacksonian	1834 (special)	Incumbent died May 1, 1836. New member elected October 11, 1836 and seated December 19, 1836. Jacksonian hold. Winner also elected to the next term; see below.	▌ ✓ John P. Richardson (Jacksonian) 59.58%; ▌J. G. Bowman (Unknown) 40.42%
Georgia at-large	John E. Coffee	Jacksonian	1832	Incumbent died September 25, 1836. New member elected October 30, 1836 and seated December 26, 1836. Nullifier gain. Winner had already been elected to the next term; see below.	▌ ✓ William C. Dawson (Nullifier) 53.03%; ▌John W. A. Sanford (Jacksonian) 46.97%
Pennsylvania 13	Jesse Miller	Jacksonian	1832	Incumbent resigned October 30, 1836. New member elected November 4, 1836 and seated December 5, 1836. Jacksonian hold. Winner was not a candidate for the next term; see below.	▌ ✓ James Black (Jacksonian) 56.62%; ▌Robert Elliott (National Republican) 43.38%
Mississippi at-large	David Dickson	Jacksonian	1835	Incumbent died July 31, 1836. New member elected November 7, 1836 and seated January 7, 1837. Jacksonian hold. Winner lost election to the next term; see below.	▌ ✓ Samuel J. Gholson (Jacksonian) 52.19%; ▌John A. Quitman (National Republican) 47.81%
New York 17	Samuel Beardsley	Jacksonian	1830	Incumbent resigned March 29, 1836. New member elected November 7–9, 1836 and seated December 5, 1836. Jacksonian hold. Winner was not a candidate for the next term; see below.	▌ ✓ Rutger B. Miller (Jacksonian) 48.84%; ▌Joshua A. Spencer (National Republican) 40.57%; ▌Elisha Pettibone (Anti-Monopoly)
New York 30	Philo C. Fuller	Jacksonian	1832	Incumbent resigned September 2, 1836. New member elected November 9, 1836 and seated December 6, 1836. National Republican gain. Winner was not a candidate for the next term; see below.	▌ ✓ John Young (National Republican); [data missing]
New Jersey at-large	Philemon Dickerson	Jacksonian	1832	Incumbent resigned November 3, 1836, to become Governor of New Jersey. New member elected November 15–16, 1836 and seated December 5, 1836. National Republican gain. Winner was not a candidate for the next term; see below.	▌ ✓ William Chetwood (National Republican) 50.40%; ▌John Travers (Jacksonian) 49.60%
Georgia at-large	George W. Towns	Jacksonian	1834	Incumbent resigned September 1, 1836. New member elected January 2, 1837 and seated January 31, 1837. National Republican gain. Winner had already lost election to the next term; see below.	▌ ✓ Julius C. Alford (National Republican) 53.43%; ▌James Liddell (Jacksonian) 46.57%
Indiana 6	George L. Kinnard	Jacksonian	1833	Incumbent died November 26, 1836. New member elected January 2, 1837 and seated January 25, 1837. National Republican gain. Winner later elected to the next term; see below.	▌ ✓ William Herod (National Republican) 51.46%; ▌William W. Wick (Jacksonian) 48.54%

=== 25th Congress ===
District	Incumbent			This race	
District	Member	Party	First elected	Results	Candidates
Pennsylvania 3	Francis J. Harper	Democratic	1836	Incumbent died March 18, 1837, having just been seated. New member elected June 29, 1837 and seated September 4, 1837. Whig gain.	▌ ✓ Charles Naylor (Whig) 51.2%; ▌Charles J. Ingersoll (Democratic) 48.8%
Mississippi at-large	John F. H. Claiborne	Democratic	1835	Mississippi elected its members in November of odd numbered years (after the beginning of the term). As Congress had been called to meet in September, the governor ordered a special election to fill vacancies until the regular election. Incumbents re-elected July 18, 1837 and seated September 4, 1837. Democratic hold. At their request the question of the validity of their election was referred to the Committee on Elections. The House decided October 3, 1837, they had been elected for the full term. (Note: The decision was later rescinded, leading to a new special election.)	▌ ✓ John F. H. Claiborne (Democratic) 32.10%; ▌ ✓ Samuel J. Gholson (Democratic) 28.43%; ▌Sergeant S. Prentiss (Whig) 20.47%; ▌E. L. Acee (Whig) 19.00%
Mississippi at-large	Samuel J. Gholson	Democratic	1836 (special)		▌ ✓ John F. H. Claiborne (Democratic) 32.10%; ▌ ✓ Samuel J. Gholson (Democratic) 28.43%; ▌Sergeant S. Prentiss (Whig) 20.47%; ▌E. L. Acee (Whig) 19.00%
Tennessee 4	James I. Standifer	Whig	1823; 1825 (lost); 1829	Incumbent died August 20, 1837. New member elected September 14, 1837 and seated October 6, 1837. Whig hold.	▌ ✓ William Stone (Whig) 27.01%; ▌Thomas Brown (Unknown) 20.60%; ▌Miles Vernon (Unknown) 17.84%; ▌T. Nixon Vandyke (Unknown) 13.51%; ▌John Rice (Democratic) 9.85%; ▌John Miller (Democratic) 7.28%; ▌Archibald R. Turk (Unknown) 3.92%
Ohio 17	Andrew W. Loomis	Whig	1836	Incumbent resigned October 20, 1837. New member elected November 30, 1837 and seated December 20, 1837. Whig hold.	▌ ✓ Charles D. Coffin (Whig) 50.62%; ▌George McCook (Democratic) 49.38%

== Alabama ==
District	Incumbent			This race	
District	Member	Party	First elected	Results	Candidates
Alabama 1
Alabama 2
Alabama 3
Alabama 4
Alabama 5

== Arkansas ==
=== 24th Congress ===
The new state of Arkansas was admitted to the Union on June 15, 1836, and elected its sole at-large member August 1, 1836. He was seated December 5, 1836, to finish the term that would end the following March.

District	Incumbent			This race	
District	Member	Party	First elected	Results	Candidates
Arkansas at-large	New seat			New seat. Jacksonian gain. Same member also later elected to the next term; see below.	▌ ✓ Archibald Yell (Jacksonian) 71.92%; ▌William Cummins (Whig) 28.08%

=== 25th Congress ===
Arkansas elected its member October 2, 1837, this time for a full term.

District	Incumbent			This race	
District	Member	Party	First elected	Results	Candidates
Arkansas at-large	Archibald Yell	Democratic	1836	Incumbent re-elected.	▌ ✓ Archibald Yell (Democratic) 62.38%; ▌John Ringgold (Whig) 37.62%

== Connecticut ==
Connecticut went from six at-large seats to six districts for the first time. Elections were held April 3, 1837, after the new term began but before the Congress convened. All incumbents from the at-large district were re-elected in districts.

District	Incumbent			This race	
District	Member	Party	First elected	Results	Candidates
Connecticut 1	Isaac Toucey	Jacksonian	1835	Incumbent re-elected.	▌ ✓ Isaac Toucey (Jacksonian) 50.3%; ▌Joseph Trumbull (National Republican) 49.5%
Connecticut 2	Samuel Ingham	Jacksonian	1835	Incumbent re-elected.	▌ ✓ Samuel Ingham (Jacksonian) 55.2%; ▌Henry C. Flagg (National Republican) 44.5%
Connecticut 3	Elisha Haley	Jacksonian	1835	Incumbent re-elected.	▌ ✓ Elisha Haley (Jacksonian) 51.2%; ▌Thomas W. Williams (National Republican) 48.7%
Connecticut 4	Thomas T. Whittlesey	Jacksonian	1836 (special)	Incumbent re-elected.	▌ ✓ Thomas T. Whittlesey (Jacksonian) 53.5%; ▌Gideon Tomlinson (National Republican) 46.5%
Connecticut 5	Lancelot Phelps	Jacksonian	1835	Incumbent re-elected.	▌ ✓ Lancelot Phelps (Jacksonian) 50.7%; ▌Phineas Miner (National Republican) 49.2%
Connecticut 6	Orrin Holt	Jacksonian	1836 (special)	Incumbent re-elected.	▌ ✓ Orrin Holt (Jacksonian) 52.3%; ▌John H. Brockway (National Republican) 47.6%

== Delaware ==
District	Incumbent			This race	
District	Member	Party	First elected	Results	Candidates
Delaware at-large

== Florida Territory ==
See Non-voting delegates, below.

== Georgia ==
District	Incumbent			This race	
District	Member	Party	First elected	Results	Candidates
Georgia at-large 9 at-large seats					Elected on a general ticket:

== Illinois ==
Illinois elected its three members on August 1, 1834.

District	Incumbent			This race	
District	Member	Party	First elected	Results	Candidates
Illinois 1	John Reynolds	Jacksonian	1834	Incumbent lost re-election as a Democrat. Democratic hold.	▌ ✓ Adam W. Snyder (Democratic) 40.4%; ▌John Reynolds (Democratic) 39.4%; ▌William J. Gatewood (Whig) 20.2%
Illinois 2	Zadok Casey	Jacksonian	1832	Incumbent re-elected as a Democrat. Democratic hold.	▌ ✓ Zadok Casey (Democratic) 65.8%; ▌Alexander P. Field (Whig) 32.9%; ▌Nathaniel Harmison (Independent) 1.3%
Illinois 3	William L. May	Jacksonian	1834	Incumbent re-elected as a Democrat. Democratic hold.	▌ ✓ William L. May (Democratic) 54.0%; ▌John T. Stuart (Whig) 46.0%

== Indiana ==
District	Incumbent			This race	
District	Member	Party	First elected	Results	Candidates
Indiana 1
Indiana 2
Indiana 3
Indiana 4
Indiana 5
Indiana 6
Indiana 7

== Kentucky ==
District	Incumbent			This race	
District	Member	Party	First elected	Results	Candidates
Kentucky 1
Kentucky 2
Kentucky 3
Kentucky 4
Kentucky 5
Kentucky 6
Kentucky 7
Kentucky 8
Kentucky 9
Kentucky 10
Kentucky 11
Kentucky 12
Kentucky 13

== Louisiana ==
District	Incumbent			This race	
District	Member	Party	First elected	Results	Candidates
Louisiana 1
Louisiana 2
Louisiana 3

== Maine ==
Maine elected its members September 12, 1836, except one district went to multiple ballots later in the year.

District	Incumbent			This race	
District	Member	Party	First elected	Results	Candidates
Maine 1
Maine 2
Maine 3
Maine 4
Maine 5
Maine 6
Maine 7
Maine 8	Gorham Parks	Democratic	1833	Unknown if incumbent retired or lost renomination. New member elected after two ballots. Democratic hold.	First ballot (September 12, 1836): ▌ ✓ Thomas Davee (Democratic) 49.38%; ▌John S. Tenney (Whig) 39.55%; ▌James Bates (Democratic) 10.13%; Second ballot (November 8, 1836): ▌ ✓ Thomas Davee (Democratic) 58.09%; ▌John S. Tenney (Whig) 40.82%; Others 1.10%

== Maryland ==
District	Incumbent			This race	
District	Member	Party	First elected	Results	Candidates
Maryland 1
Maryland 2
Maryland 3
Maryland 4 Plural district with 2 seats					
Maryland 5
Maryland 6
Maryland 7
Maryland 8

== Massachusetts ==
Elections were held November 14, 1836.

District	Incumbent			This race	
District	Member	Party	First elected	Results	Candidates
Massachusetts 1	Abbott Lawrence	Anti-Jacksonian	1834	Incumbent retired. Whig gain.	▌ ✓ Richard Fletcher (Whig) 61.8%; ▌Amasa Walker (Democratic) 38.0%
Massachusetts 2	Stephen C. Phillips	Anti-Jacksonian	1834 (special)	Incumbent re-elected as a Whig. Whig hold.	▌ ✓ Stephen C. Phillips (Whig) 51.1%; ▌Joseph S. Cabot (Democratic) 48.9%
Massachusetts 3	Caleb Cushing	Anti-Jacksonian	1834	Incumbent re-elected as a Whig. Whig hold.	▌ ✓ Caleb Cushing (Whig) 57.2%; ▌Gayton P. Osgood (Democratic) 42.2%
Massachusetts 4	Samuel Hoar	Anti-Jacksonian	1834	Incumbent lost re-election as a Whig. Democratic gain.	▌ ✓ William Parmenter (Democratic) 56.5%; ▌Samuel Hoar (Whig) 43.4%
Massachusetts 5	Levi Lincoln Jr.	Anti-Jacksonian	1834 (special)	Incumbent re-elected as a Whig. Whig hold.	▌ ✓ Levi Lincoln Jr. (Whig) 65.5%; ▌Jubal Harrington (Democratic) 34.1%
Massachusetts 6	George Grennell Jr.	Anti-Jacksonian	1834	Incumbent re-elected as a Whig. Whig hold.	▌ ✓ George Grennell Jr. (Whig) 69.9%; ▌Samuel C. Allen (Democratic) 29.7%
Massachusetts 7	George N. Briggs	Anti-Jacksonian	1830	Incumbent re-elected as a Whig. Whig hold.	▌ ✓ George N. Briggs (Whig) 54.5%; ▌Theodore Sedgwick (Democratic) 45.2%
Massachusetts 8	William B. Calhoun	Anti-Jacksonian	1834	Incumbent re-elected as a Whig. Whig hold.	▌ ✓ William B. Calhoun (Whig) 54.5%; ▌George Bancroft (Democratic) 45.2%
Massachusetts 9	William S. Hastings	Anti-Jacksonian	1836	Incumbent re-elected as a Whig. Whig hold.	▌ ✓ William S. Hastings (Whig) 55.2%; ▌Alexander H. Everett (Democratic) 43.9%
Massachusetts 10	Nathaniel B. Borden	Jacksonian	1835	Incumbent re-elected as a Democrat. Democratic hold.	▌ ✓ Nathaniel B. Borden (Democratic) 68.86%; ▌William Baylies (Whig) 31.14%
Massachusetts 11	John Reed Jr.	Anti-Masonic	1812; 1816 (lost); 1818	Incumbent re-elected as a Whig. Whig hold.	▌ ✓ John Reed Jr. (Whig) 55.8%; ▌Henry Crocker (Democratic) 44.2%
Massachusetts 12	John Quincy Adams	Anti-Masonic	1830	Incumbent re-elected as a Whig. Whig hold.	▌ ✓ John Quincy Adams (Whig) 83.31%; ▌Solomon Lincoln (Democratic) 6.93%; ▌John Thomas (Unknown) 5.92%; Scattering 3.84%

== Michigan ==
Michigan elected its sole member late on August 22, 1837.

District	Incumbent			This race	
District	Member	Party	First elected	Results	Candidates
Michigan at-large	Isaac E. Crary	Jacksonian	1835	Incumbent re-elected as a Democrat. Democratic hold.	▌ ✓ Isaac E. Crary (Democratic) 52.6%; ▌Hezekiah Wells (Whig) 47.4%

== Mississippi ==
A special election was held in Mississippi on July 17–18, 1837. Its winners were Democrats John F. H. Claiborne and Samuel J. Gholson. The first session of the 25th Congress was a special session beginning on September 4, 1837, extending to October 16. In November, Mississippi, held the regular election. Seargent Smith Prentiss, a Vicksburg lawyer and Whig, unexpectedly launched a vigorous, partisan campaign. He and fellow Whig Thomas J. Word won in an upset. Claiborne and Gholson then argued that the July result entitled them to serve full terms. With the Whig Party newly organizing, the closely divided House, in which Anti-Masons, Nullifiers, and the Independent tended to align more with Whigs and to oppose Democrats, agreed to hear Prentiss. He spoke for nine hours over three days, packing the gallery, drawing Senators, and earning a national reputation for oratory and public admiration from leading Whigs including Senators Clay and Webster. The Elections Committee then required a third election. Scheduled for April 1838, it confirmed the November result. Both Whigs were seated in May late in the second session, also serving for the third session.

District	Incumbent			This race	
District	Member	Party	First elected	Results	Candidates
Mississippi at-large (2 seats)	John F. H. Claiborne	Jacksonian	1835	Incumbent lost re-election as a Democrat. Whig gain.	▌ ✓ Seargent S. Prentiss (Whig) 35.20%; ▌ ✓ Thomas J. Word (Whig) 31.82%; ▌John F. H. Claiborne (Democratic) 17.43%; ▌Samuel J. Gholson (Democratic) 15.55%
Mississippi at-large (2 seats)	Samuel J. Gholson	Jacksonian	1836 (special)	Incumbent lost re-election as a Democrat. Whig gain.	▌ ✓ Seargent S. Prentiss (Whig) 35.20%; ▌ ✓ Thomas J. Word (Whig) 31.82%; ▌John F. H. Claiborne (Democratic) 17.43%; ▌Samuel J. Gholson (Democratic) 15.55%

== Missouri ==
District	Incumbent			This race	
District	Member	Party	First elected	Results	Candidates
Missouri at-large At-large with 2 seats					

== New Hampshire ==
District	Incumbent			This race	
District	Member	Party	First elected	Results	Candidates
New Hampshire at-large At-large with 5 seats					

== New Jersey ==
District	Incumbent			This race	
District	Member	Party	First elected	Results	Candidates
New Jersey at-large At-large with 6 seats	William Chetwood	Whig	1836 (special)	Incumbent retired. Whig hold.	▌ ✓ William Halsted (Whig) 50.70%; ▌ ✓ Charles C. Stratton (Whig) 50.58%; ▌ ✓ John P. B. Maxwell (Whig) 50.55%; ▌ ✓ Joseph F. Randolph (Whig) 50.54%; ▌ ✓ John Bancker Aycrigg (Whig) 50.52%; ▌ ✓ Thomas J. Yorke (Whig) 49.82%; ▌Charles Sitgraves (Democratic) 49.65%; ▌Daniel Holmes (Democratic) 49.62%; ▌John M. Cornelison (Democratic) 49.60%; ▌Richard P. Thompson (Democratic) 49.57%; ▌John W. Mickle (Democratic) 49.54%; ▌Samuel R. Hamilton (Democratic) 49.30%
New Jersey at-large At-large with 6 seats	Samuel Fowler	Jacksonian	1832	Incumbent retired. Whig gain.	▌ ✓ William Halsted (Whig) 50.70%; ▌ ✓ Charles C. Stratton (Whig) 50.58%; ▌ ✓ John P. B. Maxwell (Whig) 50.55%; ▌ ✓ Joseph F. Randolph (Whig) 50.54%; ▌ ✓ John Bancker Aycrigg (Whig) 50.52%; ▌ ✓ Thomas J. Yorke (Whig) 49.82%; ▌Charles Sitgraves (Democratic) 49.65%; ▌Daniel Holmes (Democratic) 49.62%; ▌John M. Cornelison (Democratic) 49.60%; ▌Richard P. Thompson (Democratic) 49.57%; ▌John W. Mickle (Democratic) 49.54%; ▌Samuel R. Hamilton (Democratic) 49.30%
New Jersey at-large At-large with 6 seats	Thomas Lee	Jacksonian	1832	Incumbent retired. Whig gain.	▌ ✓ William Halsted (Whig) 50.70%; ▌ ✓ Charles C. Stratton (Whig) 50.58%; ▌ ✓ John P. B. Maxwell (Whig) 50.55%; ▌ ✓ Joseph F. Randolph (Whig) 50.54%; ▌ ✓ John Bancker Aycrigg (Whig) 50.52%; ▌ ✓ Thomas J. Yorke (Whig) 49.82%; ▌Charles Sitgraves (Democratic) 49.65%; ▌Daniel Holmes (Democratic) 49.62%; ▌John M. Cornelison (Democratic) 49.60%; ▌Richard P. Thompson (Democratic) 49.57%; ▌John W. Mickle (Democratic) 49.54%; ▌Samuel R. Hamilton (Democratic) 49.30%
New Jersey at-large At-large with 6 seats	James Parker	Jacksonian	1832	Incumbent retired. Whig gain.	▌ ✓ William Halsted (Whig) 50.70%; ▌ ✓ Charles C. Stratton (Whig) 50.58%; ▌ ✓ John P. B. Maxwell (Whig) 50.55%; ▌ ✓ Joseph F. Randolph (Whig) 50.54%; ▌ ✓ John Bancker Aycrigg (Whig) 50.52%; ▌ ✓ Thomas J. Yorke (Whig) 49.82%; ▌Charles Sitgraves (Democratic) 49.65%; ▌Daniel Holmes (Democratic) 49.62%; ▌John M. Cornelison (Democratic) 49.60%; ▌Richard P. Thompson (Democratic) 49.57%; ▌John W. Mickle (Democratic) 49.54%; ▌Samuel R. Hamilton (Democratic) 49.30%
New Jersey at-large At-large with 6 seats	Ferdinand S. Schenck	Jacksonian	1832	Incumbent retired. Whig gain.	▌ ✓ William Halsted (Whig) 50.70%; ▌ ✓ Charles C. Stratton (Whig) 50.58%; ▌ ✓ John P. B. Maxwell (Whig) 50.55%; ▌ ✓ Joseph F. Randolph (Whig) 50.54%; ▌ ✓ John Bancker Aycrigg (Whig) 50.52%; ▌ ✓ Thomas J. Yorke (Whig) 49.82%; ▌Charles Sitgraves (Democratic) 49.65%; ▌Daniel Holmes (Democratic) 49.62%; ▌John M. Cornelison (Democratic) 49.60%; ▌Richard P. Thompson (Democratic) 49.57%; ▌John W. Mickle (Democratic) 49.54%; ▌Samuel R. Hamilton (Democratic) 49.30%
New Jersey at-large At-large with 6 seats	William Norton Shinn	Jacksonian	1832	Incumbent retired. Whig gain.	▌ ✓ William Halsted (Whig) 50.70%; ▌ ✓ Charles C. Stratton (Whig) 50.58%; ▌ ✓ John P. B. Maxwell (Whig) 50.55%; ▌ ✓ Joseph F. Randolph (Whig) 50.54%; ▌ ✓ John Bancker Aycrigg (Whig) 50.52%; ▌ ✓ Thomas J. Yorke (Whig) 49.82%; ▌Charles Sitgraves (Democratic) 49.65%; ▌Daniel Holmes (Democratic) 49.62%; ▌John M. Cornelison (Democratic) 49.60%; ▌Richard P. Thompson (Democratic) 49.57%; ▌John W. Mickle (Democratic) 49.54%; ▌Samuel R. Hamilton (Democratic) 49.30%

== New York ==
District	Incumbent			This race	
District	Member	Party	First elected	Results	Candidates
New York 1
New York 2
New York 3
New York 4
New York 5
New York 6
New York 7
New York 8
New York 9
New York 10
New York 11
New York 12
New York 13
New York 14
New York 15
New York 16
New York 17
New York 18
New York 19
New York 20
New York 21
New York 22
New York 23
New York 24
New York 25
New York 26
New York 27
New York 28
New York 29
New York 30
New York 31
New York 32
New York 33
New York 34
New York 35
New York 36
New York 37
New York 38
New York 39
New York 40

== North Carolina ==
District	Incumbent			This race	
District	Member	Party	First elected	Results	Candidates
North Carolina 1
North Carolina 2
North Carolina 3
North Carolina 4
North Carolina 5
North Carolina 6
North Carolina 7
North Carolina 8
North Carolina 9
North Carolina 10
North Carolina 11
North Carolina 12
North Carolina 13

== Ohio ==
District	Incumbent			This race	
District	Member	Party	First elected	Results	Candidates
Ohio 1
Ohio 2
Ohio 3
Ohio 4
Ohio 5
Ohio 6
Ohio 7
Ohio 8
Ohio 9
Ohio 10
Ohio 11
Ohio 12
Ohio 13
Ohio 14
Ohio 15
Ohio 16
Ohio 17
Ohio 18

== Pennsylvania ==
District	Incumbent			This race	
District	Member	Party	First elected	Results	Candidates (Note: For plural districts, percent is based on assumption that each voter cast as many votes as there are seats.)
Pennsylvania 1	Joel B. Sutherland	Jacksonian	1826	Incumbent lost re-election as a Whig. Democratic hold.	▌ ✓ Lemuel Paynter (Democratic) 55.3%; ▌Joel B. Sutherland (Whig) (Note: Changed parties) 44.7%
Pennsylvania 2 Plural district with 2 seats	Joseph R. Ingersoll	Anti-Jacksonian	1834	Incumbent retired. Whig hold.	▌ ✓ John Sergeant (Whig) 63.1%; ▌ ✓ George W. Toland (Whig) 63.0%; ▌Read Longstreth (Democratic) 37.7%; ▌John M. Morris (Democratic) 36.3%
Pennsylvania 2 Plural district with 2 seats	James Harper	Anti-Jacksonian	1832	Incumbent retired. Whig hold.	▌ ✓ John Sergeant (Whig) 63.1%; ▌ ✓ George W. Toland (Whig) 63.0%; ▌Read Longstreth (Democratic) 37.7%; ▌John M. Morris (Democratic) 36.3%
Pennsylvania 3	Michael W. Ash	Jacksonian	1834	Incumbent retired. Democratic hold. Harper died March 18, 1837, leading to a special election, which was won by Naylor.	▌ ✓ Francis J. Harper (Democratic) 50.5%; ▌Charles Naylor (Whig) 49.5%
Pennsylvania 4 Plural district with 3 seats	William Hiester	Anti-Masonic	1830	Incumbent retired. Anti-Masonic hold.	▌ ✓ David Potts Jr. (Anti-Masonic) (Note: Joint Whig/Anti-Masonic ticket) 53.8%; ▌ ✓ Edward Darlington (Anti-Masonic) 53.6%; ▌ ✓ Edward Davies (Anti-Masonic) 53.6%; ▌Samuel Leiper (Democratic) 46.4%; ▌John K. Findley (Democratic) 46.3%; ▌John W. Cunningham (Democratic) 46.3%
Pennsylvania 4 Plural district with 3 seats	Edward Darlington	Anti-Masonic	1832	Incumbent re-elected.	▌ ✓ David Potts Jr. (Anti-Masonic) 53.8%; ▌ ✓ Edward Darlington (Anti-Masonic) 53.6%; ▌ ✓ Edward Davies (Anti-Masonic) 53.6%; ▌Samuel Leiper (Democratic) 46.4%; ▌John K. Findley (Democratic) 46.3%; ▌John W. Cunningham (Democratic) 46.3%
Pennsylvania 4 Plural district with 3 seats	David Potts Jr.	Anti-Masonic	1830	Incumbent re-elected.	▌ ✓ David Potts Jr. (Anti-Masonic) 53.8%; ▌ ✓ Edward Darlington (Anti-Masonic) 53.6%; ▌ ✓ Edward Davies (Anti-Masonic) 53.6%; ▌Samuel Leiper (Democratic) 46.4%; ▌John K. Findley (Democratic) 46.3%; ▌John W. Cunningham (Democratic) 46.3%
Pennsylvania 5	Jacob Fry Jr.	Jacksonian	1834	Incumbent re-elected as a Democrat.	▌ ✓ Jacob Fry Jr. (Democratic) 61.9%; ▌Daniel M. Mulvaney (Whig) 38.1%
Pennsylvania 6	Mathias Morris	Anti-Jacksonian	1834	Incumbent re-elected as a Whig.	▌ ✓ Mathias Morris (Whig) 51.4%; ▌John Rockman (Democratic) 48.6%
Pennsylvania 7	David D. Wagener	Jacksonian	1832	Incumbent re-elected as a Democrat.	▌ ✓ David D. Wagener (Democratic) 73.7%; ▌Jacob Weygandt (Whig) 26.3%
Pennsylvania 8	Edward B. Hubley	Jacksonian	1834	Incumbent re-elected as a Democrat.	▌ ✓ Edward B. Hubley (Democratic) 54.2%; ▌William Audenried (Anti-Masonic) 45.8%
Pennsylvania 9	Henry A. P. Muhlenberg	Jacksonian	1828	Incumbent re-elected as a Democrat.	▌ ✓ Henry A. P. Muhlenberg (Democratic) 57.5%; ▌Henry W. Smith (Whig) 42.5%
Pennsylvania 10	William Clark	Anti-Masonic	1832	Incumbent retired. Democratic gain.	▌ ✓ Luther Reily (Democratic) 50.8%; ▌George W. Harris (Whig) 49.2%
Pennsylvania 11	Henry Logan	Jacksonian	1834	Incumbent re-elected as a Democrat.	▌ ✓ Henry Logan (Democratic) 58.2%; ▌Jacob Kirk (Whig) 41.8%
Pennsylvania 12	George Chambers	Anti-Masonic	1832	Incumbent retired. Democratic gain.	▌ ✓ Daniel Sheffer (Democratic) 50.5%; ▌G. James McSherry (Anti-Masonic) 49.5%
Pennsylvania 13	Jesse Miller	Jacksonian	1832	Incumbent retired. Democratic hold.	▌ ✓ Charles McClure (Democratic) 57.5%; ▌William Sharon (Whig) 42.5%
Pennsylvania 14	Joseph Henderson	Jacksonian	1832	Incumbent retired. Democratic hold.	▌ ✓ William W. Potter (Democratic) 59.6%; ▌John Williamson (Anti-Masonic) 38.2%; ▌John Ashman (Anti-Masonic) 2.2%
Pennsylvania 15	Andrew Beaumont	Jacksonian	1832	Incumbent retired. Democratic hold.	▌ ✓ David Petrikin (Democratic) 52.1%; ▌John McReynolds (Whig) 47.9%
Pennsylvania 16	Joseph B. Anthony	Jacksonian	1832	Incumbent retired. Democratic hold.	▌ ✓ Robert H. Hammond (Democratic) 59.1%; ▌Ebenezer Greenough (A) 40.9%
Pennsylvania 17	John Laporte	Jacksonian	1832	Incumbent retired. Democratic hold.	▌ ✓ Samuel W. Morris (Democratic) 60.2%; ▌William Jessup (Whig) 39.8%
Pennsylvania 18	Job Mann	Jacksonian	1832	Incumbent lost re-election. Anti-Masonic gain.	▌ ✓ Charles Ogle (Anti-Masonic) 51.7%; ▌Job Mann (Democratic) 48.3%
Pennsylvania 19	John Klingensmith Jr.	Jacksonian	1832	Incumbent re-elected as a Democrat.	▌ ✓ John Klingensmith Jr. (Democratic) 58.0%; ▌James Moorhead (Whig) 42.0%
Pennsylvania 20	Andrew Buchanan	Jacksonian	1832	Incumbent re-elected as a Democrat.	▌ ✓ Andrew Buchanan (Democratic) 100%
Pennsylvania 21	Thomas M. T. McKennan	Anti-Masonic	1830	Incumbent re-elected.	▌ ✓ Thomas M. T. McKennan (Anti-Masonic) 52.2%; ▌Thomas Ringland (Democratic) 47.8%
Pennsylvania 22	Harmar Denny	Anti-Masonic	1829 (special)	Incumbent retired. Anti-Masonic hold.	▌ ✓ Richard Biddle (Anti-Masonic) 51.4%; ▌Trevanion B. Dallas (Democratic) 48.6%
Pennsylvania 23	Samuel S. Harrison	Jacksonian	1832	Incumbent retired. Democratic hold.	▌ ✓ William Beatty (Democratic) 56.5%; ▌Joseph Buffington (Whig) 43.5%
Pennsylvania 24	John Banks	Anti-Masonic	1830	Incumbent resigned April 2, 1836. Anti-Masonic hold.	▌ ✓ Thomas Henry (Anti-Masonic) 56.1%; ▌John R. Shannon (Democratic) 43.9%
Pennsylvania 25	John Galbraith	Jacksonian	1832	Incumbent retired. Democratic hold.	▌ ✓ Arnold Plumer (Democratic) 54.4%; ▌David Dick (Whig) 45.6%

== Rhode Island ==
District	Incumbent			This race	
District	Member	Party	First elected	Results	Candidates
Rhode Island at-large At-large with 2 seats					

== South Carolina ==
District	Incumbent			This race	
District	Member	Party	First elected	Results	Candidates

District	Incumbent			This race	
District	Member	Party	First elected	Results	Candidates
South Carolina 1
South Carolina 2
South Carolina 3
South Carolina 4	James H. Hammond	Nullifier	1834	Incumbent resigned February 26, 1836, because of ill-health. New member elected October 10, 1836. Nullifier hold. Successor also elected the same day to finish the current term.	▌ ✓ Franklin H. Elmore (Nullifier) 100%; Uncontested
South Carolina 5
South Carolina 6
South Carolina 7
South Carolina 8
South Carolina 9

== Tennessee ==
Elections held late, on August 3, 1837

District	Incumbent			This race	
District	Member	Party	First elected	Results	Candidates
Tennessee 1	William B. Carter	Anti-Jacksonian	1835	Incumbent re-elected. Whig hold.	▌ ✓ William B. Carter (Whig) 52.57%; ▌Thomas D. Arnold (Whig) 47.43%
Tennessee 2	Samuel Bunch	Anti-Jacksonian	1833	Incumbent lost re-election. Democratic gain.	▌ ✓ Abraham McClellan (Democratic) 47.28%; ▌Samuel Bunch (Whig) 40.14%; ▌Elliott Bartholomew (Whig) 12.58%
Tennessee 3	Luke Lea	Anti-Jacksonian	1833	Incumbent retired. Whig hold.	▌ ✓ Joseph L. Williams (Whig) 62.00%; ▌Robert M. Anderson (Whig) 38.00%
Tennessee 4	James I. Standifer	Anti-Jacksonian	1829	Incumbent re-elected. Whig hold.	▌ ✓ James I. Standifer (Whig) 65.67%; ▌William Stone (Democratic) 34.33%
Tennessee 5	John B. Forester	Anti-Jacksonian	1831	Incumbent retired. Democratic gain.	▌ ✓ Hopkins L. Turney (Democratic) 49.91%; ▌Robert Cox (Whig) 43.33%; ▌Peter Burnum (Democratic) 6.77%
Tennessee 6	Balie Peyton	Anti-Jacksonian	1833	Incumbent retired. Whig hold.	▌ ✓ William B. Campbell (Whig) 61.68%; ▌William Trousdale (Democratic) 38.32%
Tennessee 7	John Bell	Anti-Jacksonian	1827	Incumbent re-elected. Whig hold.	▌ ✓ John Bell (Whig) 100%
Tennessee 8	Abram P. Maury	Anti-Jacksonian	1835	Incumbent re-elected. Whig hold.	▌ ✓ Abram P. Maury (Whig) 55.32%; ▌William Crockett (Democratic) 44.68%
Tennessee 9	James K. Polk	Jacksonian	1825	Incumbent re-elected. Democratic hold.	▌ ✓ James K. Polk (Democratic) 100%
Tennessee 10	Ebenezer J. Shields	Anti-Jacksonian	1835	Incumbent re-elected. Whig hold.	▌ ✓ Ebenezer J. Shields (Whig) 55.73%; ▌Andrew A. Kincannon (Democratic) 44.27%
Tennessee 11	Cave Johnson	Jacksonian	1829	Incumbent lost re-election. Whig gain.	▌ ✓ Richard Cheatham (Whig) 50.60%; ▌Cave Johnson (Democratic) 49.40%
Tennessee 12	Adam Huntsman	Jacksonian	1835	Incumbent retired. Whig gain.	▌ ✓ John W. Crockett (Whig) 64.30%; ▌Archelans M. Hughes (Democratic) 35.70%
Tennessee 13	William C. Dunlap	Jacksonian	1833	Incumbent lost re-election. Whig gain.	▌ ✓ Christopher H. Williams (Whig) 60.65%; ▌William C. Dunlap (Democratic) 39.35%

== Vermont ==
District	Incumbent			This race	
District	Member	Party	First elected	Results	Candidates
Vermont 1	Hiland Hall	National; Republican	1833 (special)	Incumbent re-elected as a Whig.	▌ ✓ Hiland Hall (Whig) 57.2%; ▌John S. Robinson (Democratic) 41.0%
Vermont 2	William Slade	Anti-Masonic	1831 (special)	Incumbent re-elected as a Whig. Whig gain.	▌ ✓ William Slade (Whig) 64.8%; ▌Jonas Clark (Democratic) 25.4%; ▌Joel Barber Jr. (Unknown) 9.8%
Vermont 3	Horace Everett	National; Republican	1828	Incumbent re-elected as a Whig.	First ballot: ▌Horace Everett (Whig) 46.8%; ▌Alden Partridge (Democratic) 40.2%; ▌Martin Flint (Anti-Masonic) 12.1%; Second ballot: ▌ ✓ Horace Everett (Whig) 61.5%; ▌Alden Partridge (Democratic) 36.6%; ▌Martin Flint (Anti-Masonic) 1.8%
Vermont 4	Heman Allen	National; Republican	1832 (late)	Incumbent re-elected as a Whig.	▌ ✓ Heman Allen (Whig) 60.6%; ▌Cornelius P. Van Ness (Democratic) 39.4%
Vermont 5	Henry Fisk Janes	Anti-Masonic	1834	Incumbent lost re-election. Democratic gain.	▌ ✓ Isaac Fletcher (Democratic) 52.8%; ▌Henry Fisk Janes (Anti-Masonic) 46.6%

== Virginia ==
District	Incumbent			This race	
District	Member	Party	First elected	Results	Candidates
Virginia 1	George Loyall	Jacksonian	1833	Incumbent retired. Whig gain.	▌ ✓ Francis Mallory (Whig) 50.3%; ▌Joel Holleman (Democratic) 47.5%
Virginia 2	John Y. Mason	Jacksonian	1831	Incumbent retired. Democratic hold.	▌ ✓ Francis E. Rives (Democratic) 72.1%; ▌William B. Goodwyn (Whig) 27.9%
Virginia 3	John Winston Jones	Jacksonian	1835	Incumbent re-elected as a Democrat.	▌ ✓ John Winston Jones (Democratic) 100%
Virginia 4	George Dromgoole	Jacksonian	1835	Incumbent re-elected as a Democrat.	▌ ✓ George Dromgoole (Democratic) 100%
Virginia 5	James Bouldin	Jacksonian	1834 (special)	Incumbent re-elected as a Democrat.	▌ ✓ James Bouldin (Democratic) 100%
Virginia 6	Walter Coles	Jacksonian	1835	Incumbent re-elected as a Democrat.	▌ ✓ Walter Coles (Democratic) 65.0%; ▌John Kerr (Whig) 35.0%
Virginia 7	Nathaniel Claiborne	National; Republican	1825	Incumbent lost re-election as a Whig. Democratic gain.	▌ ✓ Archibald Stuart (Democratic) 51.3%; ▌Nathaniel Claiborne (Whig) 48.7%
Virginia 8	Henry A. Wise	Jacksonian	1833	Incumbent re-elected as a Whig. Whig gain.	▌ ✓ Henry A. Wise (Whig) 64.1%; ▌William C. Jones (Democratic) 35.9%
Virginia 9	John Roane	Jacksonian	1835	Incumbent retired. Whig gain.	▌ ✓ Robert M. T. Hunter (Whig) 58.1%; ▌Archibald R. Harwood (Democratic) 39.0%; ▌Edwin Upshaw (Democratic) 2.9%
Virginia 10	John Taliaferro	National; Republican	1835	Incumbent re-elected as a Whig.	▌ ✓ John Taliaferro (Whig) 54.0%; ▌John Gibson (Democratic) 46.0%
Virginia 11	John Robertson	National; Republican	1834 (special)	Incumbent re-elected as a Whig.	▌ ✓ John Robertson (Whig) 100%
Virginia 12	James Garland	Jacksonian	1835	Incumbent re-elected as a Democrat.	▌ ✓ James Garland (Democratic) 100%
Virginia 13	John M. Patton	Jacksonian	1830 (special)	Incumbent re-elected as a Democrat.	▌ ✓ John M. Patton (Democratic) 100%
Virginia 14	Charles F. Mercer	National; Republican	1817	Incumbent re-elected as a Whig.	▌ ✓ Charles F. Mercer (Whig) 66.0%; ▌William T. T. Mason (Democratic) 34.0%
Virginia 15	Edward Lucas	Jacksonian	1833	Incumbent retired. Democratic hold.	▌ ✓ James M. Mason (Democratic) 62.2%; ▌John D. B. Smith (Whig) 37.8%
Virginia 16	James M. H. Beale	Jacksonian	1833	Incumbent retired. Democratic hold.	▌ ✓ Isaac S. Pennybacker (Democratic) 63.0%; ▌David Steele (Whig) 37.0%
Virginia 17	Robert Craig	Jacksonian	1835	Incumbent re-elected as a Democrat.	▌ ✓ Robert Craig (Democratic) 67.6%; ▌E. Johnson (Whig) 32.4%
Virginia 18	George W. Hopkins	Jacksonian	1835	Incumbent re-elected as a Democrat.	▌ ✓ George W. Hopkins (Democratic) 64.6%; ▌John N. Humes (Whig) 35.4%
Virginia 19	William McComas	National; Republican	1833	Incumbent retired. Democratic gain.	▌ ✓ Andrew Beirne (Democratic) 64.3%; ▌Andrew Donnally (Whig) 35.7%
Virginia 20	Joseph Johnson	Jacksonian	1835	Incumbent re-elected as a Democrat.	▌ ✓ Joseph Johnson (Democratic) 63.1%; ▌John J. Jackson (Whig) 36.9%
Virginia 21	William S. Morgan	Jacksonian	1835	Incumbent re-elected as a Democrat.	▌ ✓ William S. Morgan (Democratic) 100%

== Wisconsin Territory ==
See Non-voting delegates, below.

== Non-voting delegates ==
District	Incumbent			This race	
District	Delegate	Party	First elected	Results	Candidates
Florida Territory at-large	Joseph M. White	Jacksonian	1825	Incumbent lost re-election. Winner was not elected to finish the current term.	▌ ✓ Charles Downing (Jacksonian); ▌Joseph M. White (Jacksonian); [data missing]
Wisconsin Territory at-large	New district			New seat created. New delegate elected in October 1836 and seated December 5, 1836. Jacksonian gain.	▌ ✓ George Wallace Jones (Jacksonian); [data missing]

== See also ==
- 1836 United States elections
  - 1836 United States presidential election
  - 1836–37 United States Senate elections
- 24th United States Congress
- 25th United States Congress
- List of United States House of Representatives elections (1824–1854)

== Bibliography ==
- Dubin, Michael J. (March 1, 1998). United States Congressional Elections, 1788-1997: The Official Results of the Elections of the 1st Through 105th Congresses. McFarland and Company. ISBN 978-0786402830.
- Martis, Kenneth C. (January 1, 1989). The Historical Atlas of Political Parties in the United States Congress, 1789-1989. Macmillan Publishing Company. ISBN 978-0029201701.
- Moore, John L., ed. (1994). Congressional Quarterly's Guide to U.S. Elections (Third ed.). Congressional Quarterly Inc. ISBN 978-0871879967.
- "Party Divisions of the House of Representatives* 1789–Present". Office of the Historian, House of United States House of Representatives.
