= List of former United States representatives (J) =

This is a complete list of former United States representatives whose last names begin with the letter J.

== Number of years and terms the member has served ==
The number of years the representative/delegate has served in Congress indicates the number of terms the representative/delegate has. Note the representative/delegate can also serve non-consecutive terms if the representative/delegate loses election and wins re-election to the House.

- 2 years – 1 or 2 terms
- 4 years – 2 or 3 terms
- 6 years – 3 or 4 terms
- 8 years – 4 or 5 terms
- 10 years – 5 or 6 terms
- 12 years – 6 or 7 terms
- 14 years – 7 or 8 terms
- 16 years – 8 or 9 terms
- 18 years – 9 or 10 terms
- 20 years – 10 or 11 terms
- 22 years – 11 or 12 terms
- 24 years – 12 or 13 terms
- 26 years – 13 or 14 terms
- 28 years – 14 or 15 terms
- 30 years – 15 or 16 terms
- 32 years – 16 or 17 terms
- 34 years – 17 or 18 terms
- 36 years – 18 or 19 terms
- 38 years – 19 or 20 terms
- 40 years – 20 or 21 terms
- 42 years – 21 or 22 terms
- 44 years – 22 or 23 terms
- 46 years – 23 or 24 terms
- 48 years – 24 or 25 terms
- 50 years – 25 or 26 terms
- 52 years – 26 or 27 terms
- 54 years – 27 or 28 terms
- 56 years – 28 or 29 terms
- 58 years – 29 or 30 terms

Name	Term	State/ Territory	Party	Lifespan
Summers Melville Jack	1899–1903	Pennsylvania	Republican	1852–1945
William Jack	1841–1843	Pennsylvania	Democratic	1788–1852
Alfred Metcalf Jackson	1901–1903	Kansas	Democratic	1860–1924
Amos H. Jackson	1903–1905	Ohio	Republican	1846–1924
Andrew Jackson	1796–1797	Tennessee	Democratic-Republican	1767–1845
David S. Jackson	1847–1848	New York	Democratic	1813–1872
Donald L. Jackson	1947–1961	California	Republican	1910–1981
Ebenezer Jackson Jr.	1834–1835	Connecticut	National Republican	1796–1874
Edward B. Jackson	1820–1823	Virginia	Democratic-Republican	1793–1826
Fred S. Jackson	1911–1913	Kansas	Republican	1868–1931
George Jackson	1795–1797; 1799–1803	Virginia	Democratic-Republican	1757–1831
Henry M. Jackson	1941–1953	Washington	Democratic	1912–1983
Jabez Young Jackson	1835–1839	Georgia	Democratic	1790–18??
James Jackson	1789–1791	Georgia	Anti-Administration	1757–1806
James Jackson	1857–1861	Georgia	Democratic	1819–1887
James M. Jackson	1889–1890	West Virginia	Democratic	1825–1901
James S. Jackson	1861	Kentucky	Unionist	1823–1862
Jeff Jackson	2023–2024	North Carolina	Democratic	1982–present
Jesse Jackson Jr.	1995–2012	Illinois	Democratic	1965–present
John G. Jackson	1803–1810; 1813–1817	Virginia	Democratic-Republican	1777–1825
Joseph W. Jackson	1850–1851	Georgia	Democratic	1796–1854
Joseph W. Jackson	1851–1853	Georgia	States Rights	1796–1854
Oscar Lawrence Jackson	1885–1889	Pennsylvania	Republican	1840–1920
Richard Jackson Jr.	1808–1815	Rhode Island	Federalist	1764–1838
Thomas B. Jackson	1837–1841	New York	Democratic	1797–1881
William Jackson	1833–1837	Massachusetts	Anti-Masonic	1783–1855
William Humphreys Jackson	1901–1905; 1907–1909	Maryland	Republican	1839–1915
William Terry Jackson	1849–1851	New York	Whig	1794–1882
Sheila Jackson Lee	1995–2024	Texas	Democratic	1950–2024
Andrew Jacobs Sr.	1949–1951	Indiana	Democratic	1906–1992
Andrew Jacobs Jr.	1965–1973; 1975–1997	Indiana	Democratic	1932–2013
Chris Jacobs	2020–2023	New York	Republican	1966–present
Ferris Jacobs Jr.	1881–1883	New York	Republican	1836–1886
Israel Jacobs	1791–1793	Pennsylvania	Pro-Administration	1726–1796
Orange Jacobs	1875–1879	Washington	Republican	1827–1914
Bernhard M. Jacobsen	1931–1936	Iowa	Democratic	1862–1936
William S. Jacobsen	1937–1943	Iowa	Democratic	1887–1955
Meyer Jacobstein	1923–1929	New York	Democratic	1880–1963
Henderson M. Jacoway	1911–1923	Arkansas	Democratic	1870–1947
Cornelius Comegys Jadwin	1881–1883	Pennsylvania	Republican	1835–1913
Addison James	1907–1909	Kentucky	Republican	1849–1910
Amaziah B. James	1877–1881	New York	Republican	1812–1883
Benjamin F. James	1949–1959	Pennsylvania	Republican	1885–1961
Craig James	1989–1993	Florida	Republican	1941–present
Darwin R. James	1883–1887	New York	Republican	1834–1908
Francis James	1839–1841	Pennsylvania	Anti-Masonic	1799–1886
Francis James	1841–1843	Pennsylvania	Whig	1799–1886
Hinton James	1930–1931	North Carolina	Democratic	1884–1948
Ollie Murray James	1903–1913	Kentucky	Democratic	1871–1918
Rorer A. James	1920–1921	Virginia	Democratic	1859–1921
W. Frank James	1915–1935	Michigan	Republican	1873–1945
John Jameson	1839–1841; 1843–1845; 1847–1849	Missouri	Democratic	1802–1857
William Darius Jamieson	1909–1911	Iowa	Democratic	1873–1949
Henry Fisk Janes	1834–1837	Vermont	Anti-Masonic	1792–1879
Bill Janklow	2003–2004	South Dakota	Republican	1939–2012
John Jarman	1951–1975	Oklahoma	Democratic	1915–1982
John Jarman	1975–1977	Oklahoma	Republican	1915–1982
Pete Jarman	1937–1949	Alabama	Democratic	1892–1955
Benjamin Jarrett	1937–1943	Pennsylvania	Republican	1881–1944
William P. Jarrett	1923–1927	Hawaii	Democratic	1877–1929
Leonard Jarvis	1829–1837	Maine	Democratic	1781–1854
Jacob Javits	1947–1954	New York	Republican	1904–1986
William Jayne	1863–1864	Dakota	None	1826–1916
Albert W. Jefferis	1919–1923	Nebraska	Republican	1868–1942
Lamar Jeffers	1921–1935	Alabama	Democratic	1888–1983
William Jefferson	1991–2009	Louisiana	Democratic	1947–present
Elza Jeffords	1883–1885	Mississippi	Republican	1826–1885
Jim Jeffords	1975–1989	Vermont	Republican	1934–2014
Harry P. Jeffrey	1943–1945	Ohio	Republican	1901–1997
James Edmund Jeffries	1979–1983	Kansas	Republican	1925–1997
Walter S. Jeffries	1939–1941	New Jersey	Republican	1893–1954
Thomas Jenckes	1863–1871	Rhode Island	Republican	1818–1875
Virginia E. Jenckes	1933–1939	Indiana	Democratic	1877–1975
Daniel Jenifer	1831–1833; 1835–1837	Maryland	National Republican	1791–1855
Daniel Jenifer	1837–1841	Maryland	Whig	1791–1855
Edward H. Jenison	1947–1953	Illinois	Republican	1907–1996
Albert G. Jenkins	1857–1861	Virginia	Democratic	1830–1864
Ed Jenkins	1977–1993	Georgia	Democratic	1933–2012
Evan Jenkins	2015–2018	West Virginia	Republican	1960–present
John J. Jenkins	1895–1909	Wisconsin	Republican	1843–1911
Lemuel Jenkins	1823–1825	New York	Democratic-Republican	1789–1862
Lynn Jenkins	2009–2019	Kansas	Republican	1963–present
Mitchell Jenkins	1947–1949	Pennsylvania	Republican	1896–1977
Robert Jenkins	1807–1811	Pennsylvania	Federalist	1769–1848
Thomas A. Jenkins	1925–1959	Ohio	Republican	1880–1959
Timothy Jenkins	1845–1849; 1851–1853	New York	Democratic	1799–1859
Bill Jenkins	1997–2007	Tennessee	Republican	1936–present
Arthur B. Jenks	1937–1938; 1939–1943	New Hampshire	Republican	1866–1947
George A. Jenks	1875–1877	Pennsylvania	Democratic	1836–1908
Michael Hutchinson Jenks	1843–1845	Pennsylvania	Whig	1795–1867
David Jennings	1825–1826	Ohio	National Republican	1787–1834
John Jennings	1939–1951	Tennessee	Republican	1880–1956
Jonathan Jennings	1809–1816; 1822–1825	Indiana	Democratic-Republican	1784–1834
Jonathan Jennings	1825–1831	Indiana	National Republican	1784–1834
W. Pat Jennings	1955–1967	Virginia	Democratic	1919–1994
John Jenrette	1975–1980	South Carolina	Democratic	1936–2023
Ben F. Jensen	1939–1965	Iowa	Republican	1892–1970
Thomas M. Jett	1897–1903	Illinois	Democratic	1862–1939
Freeborn G. Jewett	1831–1833	New York	Democratic	1791–1858
Hugh J. Jewett	1873–1874	Ohio	Democratic	1817–1898
Joshua Jewett	1855–1859	Kentucky	Democratic	1815–1861
Luther Jewett	1815–1817	Vermont	Federalist	1772–1860
Bobby Jindal	2005–2008	Louisiana	Republican	1971–present
Charles S. Joelson	1961–1969	New Jersey	Democratic	1916–1999
August E. Johansen	1955–1965	Michigan	Republican	1905–1995
Chris John	1997–2005	Louisiana	Democratic	1960–present
Joshua L. Johns	1939–1943	Wisconsin	Republican	1881–1947
Kensey Johns Jr.	1827–1831	Delaware	National Republican	1791–1857
Adna R. Johnson	1909–1911	Ohio	Republican	1860–1938
Albert Johnson	1913–1933	Washington	Republican	1869–1957
Albert W. Johnson	1963–1977	Pennsylvania	Republican	1906–1998
Andrew Johnson	1843–1853	Tennessee	Democratic	1808–1875
Anton J. Johnson	1939–1949	Illinois	Republican	1878–1958
Ben Johnson	1907–1927	Kentucky	Democratic	1858–1950
Bill Johnson	2011–2024	Ohio	Democratic	1954–present
Byron L. Johnson	1959–1961	Colorado	Democratic	1917–2000
Calvin D. Johnson	1943–1945	Illinois	Republican	1898–1985
Cave Johnson	1829–1837; 1839–1845	Tennessee	Democratic	1793–1866
Charles Johnson	1801–1802	North Carolina	Democratic-Republican	17??–1802
Dewey Johnson	1937–1939	Minnesota	Farmer-Labor	1899–1941
Don Johnson Jr.	1993–1995	Georgia	Democratic	1948–present
Eddie Bernice Johnson	1993–2023	Texas	Democratic	1935–2023
Francis Johnson	1820–1825	Kentucky	Democratic-Republican	1776–1842
Francis Johnson	1825–1827	Kentucky	National Republican	1776–1842
Fred Gustus Johnson	1929–1931	Nebraska	Republican	1876–1951
Frederick A. Johnson	1883–1887	New York	Republican	1833–1893
George W. Johnson	1923–1925; 1933–1943	West Virginia	Democratic	1869–1944
Glen D. Johnson	1947–1949	Oklahoma	Democratic	1911–1983
Grove L. Johnson	1895–1897	California	Republican	1841–1926
Bizz Johnson	1959–1981	California	Democratic	1907–1988
Harvey H. Johnson	1853–1855	Ohio	Democratic	1808–1896
Henry Johnson	1834–1839	Louisiana	Whig	1783–1864
Henry U. Johnson	1891–1899	Indiana	Republican	1850–1939
Jacob Johnson	1913–1915	Utah	Republican	1847–1925
James Johnson	1813–1820	Virginia	Democratic-Republican	17??–1825
James Johnson	1825–1826	Kentucky	Democratic	1774–1826
James Johnson	1851–1853	Georgia	Unionist	1811–1891
James A. Johnson	1867–1871	California	Democratic	1829–1896
James Hutchins Johnson	1845–1849	New Hampshire	Democratic	1802–1887
James Leeper Johnson	1849–1851	Kentucky	Whig	1818–1877
James Paul Johnson	1973–1981	Colorado	Republican	1930–2023
Jay Johnson	1997–1999	Wisconsin	Democratic	1943–2009
Jed Johnson	1927–1947	Oklahoma	Democratic	1888–1963
Jed Johnson Jr.	1965–1967	Oklahoma	Democratic	1939–1993
Jeromus Johnson	1825–1829	New York	Democratic	1775–1846
John Johnson	1851–1853	Ohio	Independent Democrat	1805–1867
John Telemachus Johnson	1821–1825	Kentucky	Democratic-Republican	1788–1856
Joseph Johnson	1823–1825	Virginia	Democratic-Republican	1785–1877
Joseph Johnson	1825–1827; 1833; 1835–1841; 1845–1847	Virginia	Democratic	1785–1877
Joseph T. Johnson	1901–1915	South Carolina	Democratic	1858–1919
J. Leroy Johnson	1943–1957	California	Republican	1888–1961
Lester Johnson	1953–1965	Wisconsin	Democratic	1901–1975
Luther Alexander Johnson	1923–1946	Texas	Democratic	1875–1965
Lyndon B. Johnson	1937–1949	Texas	Democratic	1908–1973
Magnus Johnson	1933–1935	Minnesota	Farmer-Labor	1871–1936
Martin N. Johnson	1891–1899	North Dakota	Republican	1850–1909
Nancy Johnson	1983–2007	Connecticut	Republican	1935–present
Noadiah Johnson	1833–1835	New York	Democratic	1795–1839
Noble J. Johnson	1925–1931; 1939–1948	Indiana	Republican	1887–1968
Paul B. Johnson Sr.	1919–1923	Mississippi	Democratic	1880–1943
Perley B. Johnson	1843–1845	Ohio	Whig	1798–1870
Philip Johnson	1861–1867	Pennsylvania	Democratic	1818–1867
Richard Mentor Johnson	1807–1819; 1829–1837	Kentucky	Democratic-Republican	1780–1850
Robert Davis Johnson	1931–1933	Missouri	Democratic	1883–1961
Robert Ward Johnson	1847–1853	Arkansas	Democratic	1814–1879
Royal C. Johnson	1915–1933	South Dakota	Republican	1882–1939
Sam Johnson	1991–2019	Texas	Republican	1930–2020
Thomas Francis Johnson	1959–1963	Maryland	Democratic	1909–1988
Tim Johnson	1987–1997	South Dakota	Democratic	1946–2024
Tim Johnson	2001–2013	Illinois	Republican	1946–2022
Tom L. Johnson	1891–1895	Ohio	Democratic	1854–1911
William Cost Johnson	1833–1835	Maryland	National Republican	1806–1860
William Cost Johnson	1837–1843	Maryland	Whig	1806–1860
William Richard Johnson	1925–1933	Illinois	Republican	1875–1938
Ward Johnson	1941–1945	California	Republican	1892–1963
Charles Johnston	1839–1841	New York	Whig	1793–1845
Charles Clement Johnston	1831–1832	Virginia	Democratic	1795–1832
David Emmons Johnston	1899–1901	West Virginia	Democratic	1845–1917
Harry Johnston	1989–1997	Florida	Democratic	1931–2021
James T. Johnston	1885–1889	Indiana	Republican	1839–1904
John B. Johnston	1919–1921	New York	Democratic	1882–1960
Joseph E. Johnston	1879–1881	Virginia	Democratic	1807–1891
Josiah S. Johnston	1821–1823	Louisiana	Democratic-Republican	1784–1833
Rowland Louis Johnston	1929–1931	Missouri	Republican	1872–1939
Thomas D. Johnston	1885–1889	North Carolina	Democratic	1840–1902
Walter E. Johnston III	1981–1983	North Carolina	Republican	1936–2018
William Johnston	1863–1865	Ohio	Democratic	1819–1866
George Johnstone	1891–1893	South Carolina	Democratic	1846–1921
John L. Jolley	1891–1893	South Dakota	Republican	1840–1926
David Jolly	2014–2017	Florida	Republican	1972–present
Charles A. Jonas	1929–1931	North Carolina	Republican	1876–1955
Charles R. Jonas	1953–1973	North Carolina	Republican	1904–1988
Edgar A. Jonas	1949–1955	Illinois	Republican	1885–1965
Alexander H. Jones	1868–1871	North Carolina	Republican	1822–1901
Ben Jones	1989–1993	Georgia	Democratic	1941–2026
Benjamin Jones	1833–1837	Ohio	Democratic	1787–1861
Brenda Jones	2018–2019	Michigan	Democratic	1959–present
Burr W. Jones	1883–1885	Wisconsin	Democratic	1846–1935
Daniel T. Jones	1851–1855	New York	Democratic	1800–1861
Ed Jones	1969–1989	Tennessee	Democratic	1912–1999
Evan John Jones	1919–1923	Pennsylvania	Republican	1872–1952
Francis Jones	1817–1823	Tennessee	Democratic-Republican	17??–18??
Frank Jones	1875–1879	New Hampshire	Democratic	1832–1902
George Wallace Jones	1835–1837; 1837–1839	Michigan; Wisconsin	Democratic	1804–1896
George Washington Jones	1843–1859	Tennessee	Democratic	1806–1884
George Washington Jones	1879–1883	Texas	Greenbacker	1828–1903
Hamilton C. Jones	1947–1953	North Carolina	Democratic	1884–1957
Homer Jones	1947–1949	Washington	Republican	1893–1970
Isaac Dashiell Jones	1841–1843	Maryland	Whig	1806–1893
James Jones	1799–1801	Georgia	Federalist	17??–1801
James Jones	1819–1823	Virginia	Democratic-Republican	1772–1848
James H. Jones	1883–1887	Texas	Democratic	1830–1904
James K. Jones	1881–1885	Arkansas	Democratic	1839–1908
James R. Jones	1973–1987	Oklahoma	Democratic	1939–present
James T. Jones	1877–1879; 1883–1889	Alabama	Democratic	1832–1895
Jehu Glancy Jones	1851–1853; 1854–1858	Pennsylvania	Democratic	1811–1878
John James Jones	1859–1861	Georgia	Democratic	1824–1898
John Marvin Jones	1917–1940	Texas	Democratic	1882–1976
John S. Jones	1877–1879	Ohio	Republican	1836–1903
John William Jones	1847–1849	Georgia	Whig	1806–1871
John Winston Jones	1835–1845	Virginia	Democratic	1791–1848
Mondaire Jones	2021–2023	New York	Democratic	1987–present
Morgan Jones	1865–1867	New York	Democratic	1830–1894
Nathaniel Jones	1837–1841	New York	Democratic	1788–1866
Owen Jones	1857–1859	Pennsylvania	Democratic	1819–1878
Paul C. Jones	1948–1969	Missouri	Democratic	1901–1981
Phineas Jones	1881–1883	New Jersey	Republican	1819–1884
Robert E. Jones Jr.	1947–1977	Alabama	Democratic	1912–1997
Robert Franklin Jones	1939–1947	Ohio	Republican	1907–1968
Roland Jones	1853–1855	Louisiana	Democratic	1813–1869
Seaborn Jones	1833–1835; 1845–1847	Georgia	Democratic	1788–1864
Thomas Laurens Jones	1867–1871; 1875–1877	Kentucky	Democratic	1819–1887
Walter Jones	1797–1799; 1803–1811	Virginia	Democratic-Republican	1745–1815
Walter B. Jones Jr.	1995–2019	North Carolina	Republican	1943–2019
Walter B. Jones Sr.	1966–1992	North Carolina	Democratic	1913–1992
Wesley L. Jones	1899–1909	Washington	Republican	1863–1932
William Jones	1801–1803	Pennsylvania	Democratic-Republican	1760–1831
William Atkinson Jones	1891–1918	Virginia	Democratic	1849–1918
William Carey Jones	1897–1899	Washington	Silver Republican	1855–1927
William Theopilus Jones	1871–1873	Wyoming	Republican	1842–1882
Woodrow W. Jones	1950–1957	North Carolina	Democratic	1914–2002
Bartel J. Jonkman	1940–1949	Michigan	Republican	1884–1955
Jim Jontz	1987–1993	Indiana	Democratic	1951–2007
Barbara Jordan	1973–1979	Texas	Democratic	1936–1996
Isaac M. Jordan	1883–1885	Ohio	Democratic	1835–1890
Edwin J. Jorden	1895	Pennsylvania	Republican	1863–1903
Joseph Jorgensen	1877–1883	Virginia	Republican	1844–1888
Antonio Joseph	1885–1895	New Mexico	Democratic	1846–1910
Henry L. Jost	1923–1925	Missouri	Democratic	1873–1950
Charles Frederick Joy	1893–1894; 1895–1903	Missouri	Republican	1849–1921
Charles Herbert Joyce	1875–1883	Vermont	Republican	1830–1916
James Joyce	1909–1911	Ohio	Republican	1870–1931
Norman B. Judd	1867–1871	Illinois	Republican	1815–1878
Walter Judd	1943–1963	Minnesota	Republican	1898–1994
Andrew T. Judson	1835–1836	Connecticut	Democratic	1784–1853
George Washington Julian	1849–1851	Indiana	Free Soiler	1817–1899
George Washington Julian	1861–1871	Indiana	Republican	1817–1899
Benjamin Franklin Junkin	1859–1861	Pennsylvania	Republican	1822–1908
Niels Juul	1917–1921	Illinois	Republican	1859–1929
