= John Brockway =

John Brockway may refer to:

- John H. Brockway (1801–1870), U.S. Representative from Connecticut
- John Brockway (swimmer) (1928–2009), Welsh competitive swimmer
