= 1837 Pennsylvania's 3rd congressional district special election =

On June 29, 1837, a special election was held in Pennsylvania's 3rd congressional district to fill a vacancy left by the death of Francis J. Harper (D) on March 18, 1837.

== Election results ==
Candidate	Party	Votes	Percent
Charles Naylor	Whig	5,072	51.2%
Charles J. Ingersoll	Democratic	4,841	48.8%

Naylor had been narrowly defeated in the 1836 election for the 3rd district. He took his seat on September 4, 1837, at the start of the 1st session of the 25th Congress.

== See also ==
- List of special elections to the United States House of Representatives
