= William Jack (American politician) =

American politician

Member of the U.S. House of Representatives from Pennsylvania's 23rd district
- In office March 4, 1841 – March 3, 1843
- Preceded by: William Beatty
- Succeeded by: Charles Manning Reed

Personal details
- Born: July 29, 1788 Greensburg, Pennsylvania
- Died: February 28, 1852 (aged 64) Greensburg, Pennsylvania
- Resting place: Old Cemetery of the St. Clair Cemetery Association
- Party: Democratic

William Jack (July 29, 1788 – February 28, 1852) was an American lawyer and politician who served one term as a Democratic member of the U.S. House of Representatives from Pennsylvania.

== Biography ==
William Jack was born in Greensburg, Pennsylvania. He studied law, was admitted to the bar and practiced.

=== Early career ===
He moved to Brookville, Pennsylvania, in 1831 and engaged in mercantile pursuits. He was the division inspector of militia for Westmoreland and Fayette Counties from 1830 to 1835. He served as sheriff of Brookville in 1833, and was a contractor and builder in Mississippi and assisted in the construction of a canal there. He returned to Pennsylvania and served as a county judge of Jefferson County, Pennsylvania, about 1840.

=== Congress ===
Jack was elected as a Democrat to the Twenty-seventh Congress.

=== Later life ===
After his time in Congress, he was engaged in agricultural pursuits.

=== Death and burial ===
He returned to Greensburg in 1846 and died there in 1852. Interment in the Old Cemetery of the St. Clair Cemetery Association.

== Sources ==
- United States Congress. "William Jack (id: J000002)". Biographical Directory of the United States Congress.
- The Political Graveyard

U.S. House of Representatives
Preceded by William Beatty	Member of the U.S. House of Representatives from Pennsylvania's 23rd congressional district 1841–1843	Succeeded by Charles M. Reed
