= Hezekiah Huntington =

American attorney (1759–1842)

United States Attorney for the District of Connecticut
- In office 1806–1829
- President: Thomas Jefferson; James Madison; James Monroe; John Quincy Adams
- Preceded by: Pierpont Edwards
- Succeeded by: Nathan Smith

Personal details
- Born: December 31, 1759 Tolland, Connecticut
- Died: May 27, 1842 (aged 82)
- Spouse: Susannah “Susan” Kent Huntington
- Relatives: Dora Richards Miller (granddaughter)
- Profession: Lawyer, politician

Military service
- Allegiance: United States
- Branch/service: Continental Army
- Battles/wars: Revolutionary War

Hezekiah Huntington (December 31, 1759 – May 27, 1842) was an American attorney and soldier who served as the United States Attorney for the District of Connecticut under four presidents.

== Biography ==
Huntington was born in Tolland, Connecticut, on December 31, 1759. He was the fourth son of John Huntington and Mehitabel Steel. He was a soldier in the revolutionary war, at one point during the war he helped a ship escape New London by navigating around the British Navy. Afterwards he studied law for one year with Gideon Granger, Esq. of Suffield, (father of the Postmaster General) and two years, with John Trumbull, Esq., of Hartford (afterwards a Judge of the Superior Court). He was admitted to the Bar, at Hartford, in 1789 and settled in the practice of the Law, in Suffield, in the fall of 1790. He was appointed, by President Jefferson, United States Attorney for the district of Connecticut, January 17, 1806, and held that office, through subsequent re-appointments, until January 17, 1829.

He represented the town of Suffield in the Connecticut General Assembly, in May 1802, May 1804, October 1804, May 1805, and Oct. 1805. In 1801, he was appointed one of the commissioners under the bankrupt law of the United States, and held that situation about two years. He moved to Hartford, in April 1813; he was appointed State's Attorney for the county of Hartford, in August 1818, and held that office until January 1822.
