= William Bristol =

American judge (1779–1836)

Judge of the United States District Court for the District of Connecticut
- In office May 22, 1826 – March 7, 1836
- Appointed by: John Quincy Adams
- Preceded by: Pierpont Edwards
- Succeeded by: Andrew T. Judson

Personal details
- Born: William Bristol; June 2, 1779 Hamden, Connecticut
- Died: March 7, 1836 (aged 56) New Haven, Connecticut, U.S.
- Education: Yale University read law

William Bristol (June 2, 1779 – March 7, 1836) was a Mayor of New Haven, Connecticut, and a United States district judge of the United States District Court for the District of Connecticut.

== Education and career ==
Born on June 2, 1779, in Hamden, Connecticut, Bristol graduated from Yale University in 1798 and read law in 1800, with David Daggett. He entered private practice in New Haven starting in 1800. He was United States Attorney for the District of Connecticut starting in 1812. He was a member of the Connecticut House of Representatives in 1817. He was a member of the Connecticut Senate from 1818 to 1819. He was an alderman for New Haven in 1818, 1821, and 1826. He was a Judge of the Connecticut Superior Court and justice of the Connecticut Supreme Court of Errors (now the Connecticut Supreme Court) from 1819 to 1826. He was the mayor of New Haven in 1827.

== Federal judicial service ==
Bristol was nominated by President John Quincy Adams on May 15, 1826, to a seat on the United States District Court for the District of Connecticut vacated by Judge Pierpont Edwards. He was confirmed by the United States Senate on May 22, 1826, and received his commission the same day. His service terminated on March 7, 1836, due to his death in New Haven. He was interred in Grove Street Cemetery in New Haven.

== Family ==
Bristol married Sarah Edwards of New Haven in New Haven, on January 6, 1805. Sarah died on December 24, 1866, aged 86 years.

== Sources ==
Political offices
Preceded by Simeon Baldwin	Mayor of New Haven; 1827	Succeeded by David Daggett
Legal offices
Preceded by Pierpont Edwards	Judge of the United States District Court for the District of Connecticut; 1826–1836	Succeeded by Andrew T. Judson
