= John Goddard Watmough =

American politician

John Goddard Watmough (December 6, 1793 – November 27, 1861) was an American politician who served as an Anti-Jacksonian member of the U.S. House of Representatives for Pennsylvania's 3rd congressional district from 1831 to 1835.

Watmough was born in Wilmington, Delaware. He pursued classical studies and graduated from Princeton College. He also did postgraduate work in the University of Pennsylvania in Philadelphia. He served in the War of 1812 as a corporal in the Fourth Company, Fourth Detachment, Pennsylvania Militia, from May 13 to July 31, 1813. He was appointed second lieutenant in the Regular Army September 2, 1813 and brevetted first lieutenant August 15, 1814, for gallant conduct in the defense of Fort Erie in Canada, and resigned on October 1, 1816.

Watmough was elected as an Anti-Jacksonian to the Twenty-second and Twenty-third Congresses and served from 1831 to 1835. He was an unsuccessful Whig candidate for reelection in 1834 to the Twenty-fourth Congress. He served as high sheriff of Philadelphia in 1835 until at least 1838, and surveyor of the port of Philadelphia from 1841 to 1845. He discontinued active pursuits in 1854 and lived in retirement until his death in Philadelphia in 1861.

== Publications ==
- Watmough, John G. (1838). Address of John G. Watmough, high sheriff, to his constituents, with reference to the disturbances which took place in the City and County of Philadelphia, during the summer of 1838. Philadelphia.
- Watmough, John G. (1834). Remarks of Mr. Watmough, of Pennsylvania, on the general appropriation bill, delivered in the House...April 9, 1834. Washington, D.C.

== Sources ==
- United States Congress. "John Goddard Watmough (id: W000195)". Biographical Directory of the United States Congress.
- The Political Graveyard

U.S. House of Representatives
Preceded by Daniel H. Miller	Member of the U.S. House of Representatives from Pennsylvania's 3rd congressional district 1831–1835	Succeeded by Michael W. Ash
