= 1836 Pennsylvania's 24th congressional district special election =

On October 11, 1836, a special election was held in Pennsylvania's 24th congressional district, to fill a vacancy left by the resignation of John Banks (AM) on April 2. This election was held at the same time as the general elections for the 25th Congress

== Election results ==
| Candidate | Party | Votes | Percent |
|---|---|---|---|
| John J. Pearson | Anti-Jacksonian | 3,410 | 57.7% |
| John Findley | Jacksonian | 2,505 | 42.3% |

Pearson took his seat December 5, 1836, at the start of the second session of the 24th Congress.

== See also ==
- List of special elections to the United States House of Representatives
