= Dora Richards Miller =

American author and educator of British ancestry

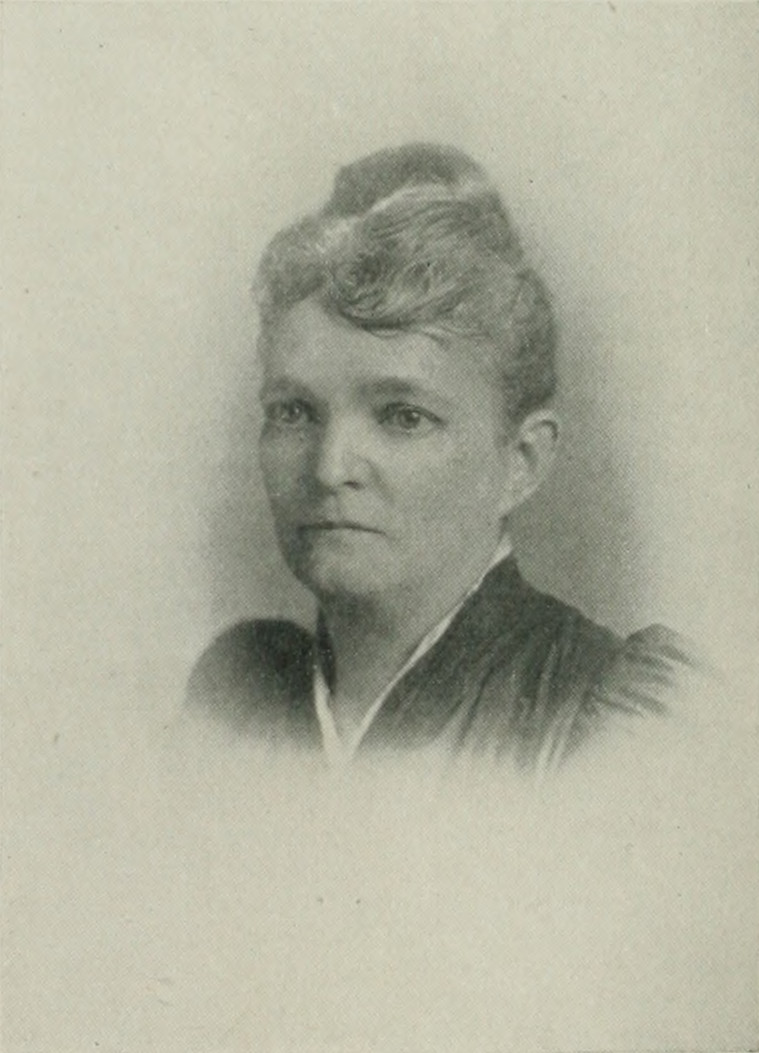
Portrait from A Woman of the Century

Dora Richards Miller (1842–1914) was a Danish West Indies-born American author and educator. She was born on the island of Saint Thomas and spent part of her childhood on the nearby island of Saint Croix before moving to New Orleans, Louisiana, following the deaths of her parents. She pursued a teaching career while supporting her younger brother and gained early recognition for her writing in New Orleans newspapers. Miller married Anderson J. Miller of Mississippi during the Civil War, later became known for her published wartime diaries, and went on to hold a prominent teaching position in New Orleans while contributing articles to national and regional publications.

== Early life and education ==
Dora Richards was born in the Island of Saint Thomas, Danish West Indies. Her father, Thomas Richard Richards (d. 1844), was from Liverpool, England, and her mother, Philomena (née, Huntington) Richards (1806–1846), was also of English descent, through Hezekiah Huntington, of Connecticut. Hezekiah was Dora's grandfather and belonged to the same family from which came Samuel Huntington, signer of the U.S. Declaration of Independence. The death of her father while she was yet an infant caused Dora to be taken to the home of her Huntington grandmother, Mary (née, Smith) Huntington (b. 1771), in the neighboring island of Santa Cruz. Hurricanes and earthquakes were among Dora's experiences there, and not long before she left the island, the 1848 St. Croix Slave Revolt took place, which resulted in the emancipation of the enslaved in all the Danish Islands. Dora's mother, with the other children, had removed to New Orleans, Louisiana, but it was not until after her mother's death, when Dora was about 14, that she joined there her unknown brothers and sisters, to reside in the family of a married sister.

She was graduated with distinction, her school-girl essays having for several years attracted attention, and the editors of a New Orleans paper invited her to contribute to their journal. She had prepared herself for the profession of a teacher and undertaken the support and education of a young brother, and thought it best to give all her powers to that work.

== Career ==
In 1862, she married Anderson J Miller (1836–1867), a lawyer from Mississippi, and they went to Arkansas to reside. Troubles resulting from the Civil War caused the breaking up of her family, and some of their experiences during the siege of Vicksburg are recounted in her articles published in The Century Magazine, entitled "Diary of a Union Woman in the Siege of Vicksburg" and "Diary of a Union Woman in the South". Her husband died soon after the close of the war, leaving her with two infant sons, Alton (1864–1909) and Warren (1865–1889).

She returned to teaching in public schools, rising steadily from grade to grade, till she was appointed to the chair of science in the girls' high school of New Orleans. During those busy years, she wrote in the local papers, without name, on education topics.

In 1886, her "War Diary" was published in The Century. Those articles attracted great attention.

In 1889, she wrote, in collaboration with George Washington Cable, "The Haunted House on Royal Street", being science teacher in the high school held in that building when it was invaded by the White League. She was correspondent for the Austin, Texas, Statesman during the World Cotton Centennial (New Orleans, 1884). She was assistant editor of a paper published in Houston, Texas, and wrote for Lippincott's Magazine, the Louisiana Journal of Education, the Practical Housekeeper and other journals.

== Selected works ==
- A Woman's Diary of the Siege of Vicksburg: Under Fire from the Gunboats, 1885 (text)
- War Diary of a Union Woman in the South (undated) (text)
