= Pierpont Edwards =

American judge (1750–1826)

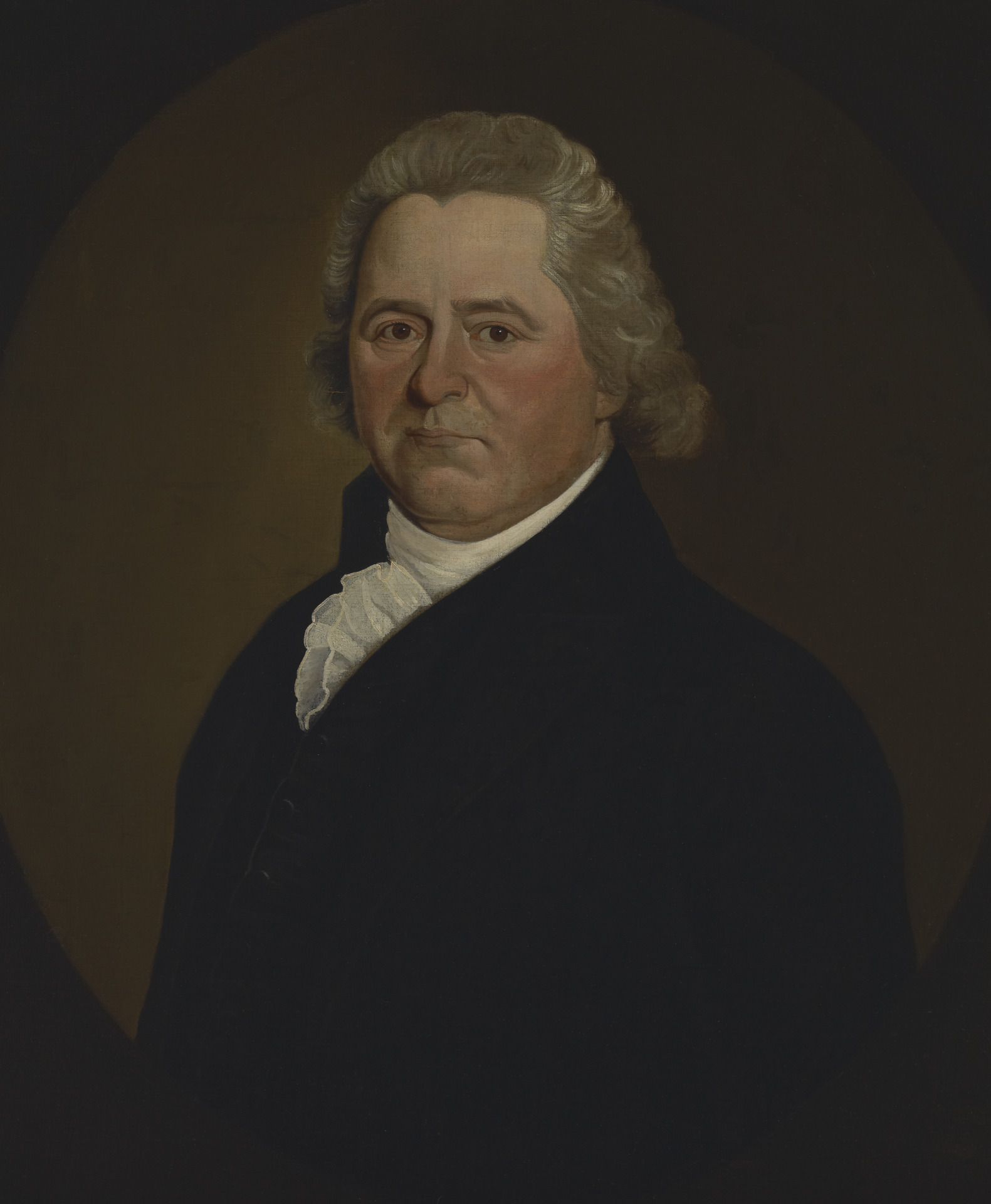
- Portrait by William Jennys, c. 1795

Judge of the United States District Court for the District of Connecticut
- In office February 24, 1806 – April 5, 1826
- Appointed by: Thomas Jefferson
- Preceded by: Richard Law
- Succeeded by: William Bristol

Member-elect of the U.S. House of Representatives from Connecticut's at-large district
- Declined to serve
- Preceded by: Jeremiah Wadsworth
- Succeeded by: Jeremiah Wadsworth

United States Attorney for the District of Connecticut
- In office 1789–1806
- President: George Washington; John Adams; Thomas Jefferson
- Preceded by: Seat established
- Succeeded by: Hezekiah Huntington

Personal details
- Born: April 8, 1750 Northampton, Massachusetts Bay, British America
- Died: April 5, 1826 (aged 75) Bridgeport, Connecticut, U.S.
- Resting place: Grove Street Cemetery
- Party: Pro-Administration
- Spouse: Frances Ogden
- Children: 2, including Henry
- Relatives: Jonathan Edwards (father)
- Education: Princeton University (BA)

Pierpont Edwards (April 8, 1750 – April 5, 1826) was a delegate to the Congress of the Confederation and was a United States district judge of the United States District Court for the District of Connecticut.

== Education and career ==
Born on April 8, 1750, in Northampton, Province of Massachusetts Bay, British America, Edwards graduated from the College of New Jersey (now Princeton University) in 1768. He entered private practice in New Haven, Connecticut Colony, British America (State of Connecticut, United States from July 4, 1776) starting in 1771. He served in the Continental Army during the American Revolutionary War. He was a member of the Connecticut House of Representatives in 1777, from 1784 to 1785, and from 1787 to 1790, serving as Speaker during his last two years. He was a delegate to the Congress of the Confederation (Continental Congress) from 1787 to 1788. He was a member of the Connecticut convention to ratify the United States Constitution in 1788. He resumed private practice in New Haven from 1790 to 1806.

== Federal judicial service ==
Edwards was nominated by President Thomas Jefferson on February 21, 1806, to a seat on the United States District Court for the District of Connecticut vacated by Judge Richard Law. He was confirmed by the United States Senate on February 24, 1806, and received his commission the same day. His service terminated on April 5, 1826, due to his death in Bridgeport, Connecticut. He was interred at Grove Street Cemetery in New Haven.

=== Other service ===
Edwards was a member of the constitutional convention which framed Connecticut's constitution of 1818.

== Honor ==
Pierpont Township, Ashtabula County, Ohio is named for him.

Edwards was a Freemason in Hiram Lodge no. 1 AF&AM in New Haven CT. He was the first Grand Master of Masons in Connecticut and the Grand Lodge of Connecticut honors distinguished members with a medal in his name.

== Family ==
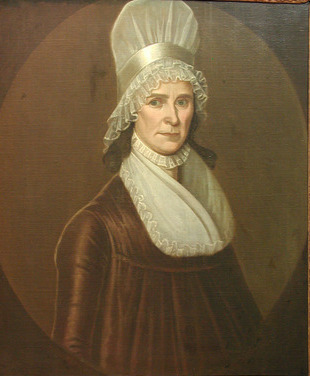
Frances Ogden Edwards

Edwards was the youngest child of theologian Jonathan Edwards. His son, Henry W. Edwards, was Governor of Connecticut and his daughter, Henrietta Frances Edwards, was married to inventor Eli Whitney. His nephew, who was only five years younger than himself, was Vice President Aaron Burr.

== Sources ==
U.S. House of Representatives
Preceded by Jeremiah Wadsworth	Member-elect of the U.S. House of Representatives from Connecticut's at-large congressional district 1790	Succeeded by Jeremiah Wadsworth
Legal offices
Preceded by Richard Law	Judge of the United States District Court for the District of Connecticut; 1806–1826	Succeeded by William Bristol
