= Orrin Holt =

American politician (1792–1855)

Orrin Holt (March 13, 1792 – June 20, 1855) was a United States representative from Connecticut. He was born in Willington, Connecticut. He received a limited schooling and engaged in agricultural pursuits. He was a member of the Connecticut State House of Representatives 1830–1832. He then served in the Connecticut Senate in 1835 and 1836.

Holt was elected as a Jacksonian to the 24th Congress to fill the vacancy caused by the resignation of Andrew T. Judson. He was reelected as a Democrat to the 25th Congress and served from December 5, 1836, to March 3, 1839. He then resumed agricultural pursuits and was also interested in military organizations of the State of Connecticut and held official ranks up to inspector general. He died in East Willington, Connecticut in 1855 and was buried in Old Cemetery, Willington Hill, Connecticut.

U.S. House of Representatives
Preceded by Andrew T. Judson	Member of the U.S. House of Representatives from Connecticut's at-large congressional district 1836–1837	Succeeded by District inactive
Preceded by District created	Member of the U.S. House of Representatives from Connecticut's 6th congressional district 1837–1839	Succeeded by John H. Brockway
