= Charles Naylor =

American politician (1806–1873)

Member of the U.S. House of Representatives from Pennsylvania's 3rd district
- In office June 29, 1837 – March 4, 1841
- Preceded by: Francis Jacob Harper
- Succeeded by: Charles Jared Ingersoll

Personal details
- Born: October 6, 1806 Philadelphia, Pennsylvania, U.S.
- Died: December 24, 1872 (aged 66) Philadelphia, Pennsylvania, U.S.
- Resting place: Laurel Hill Cemetery, Philadelphia, Pennsylvania, U.S.
- Party: Whig

Charles Naylor (October 6, 1806 – December 24, 1872) was an American politician from Pennsylvania who served as a Whig party member of the United States House of Representatives for Pennsylvania's 3rd congressional district from 1837 to 1841. During the Philadelphia nativist riots, he was arrested while preventing militia troops from firing on nativist rioters. He raised a company of volunteers, known as the Philadelphia Rangers, and served as captain during the Mexican-American War.

== Early life and education ==
Naylor was born on October 6, 1806, in Philadelphia, Pennsylvania. At a young age he read John Neal's poem Battle of Niagara and became inspired by Neal's life. He studied law, was admitted to the bar in 1828 and began to practice law in Philadelphia.

== Career ==
He held several local offices, and was an unsuccessful candidate for election in 1836 to the Twenty-fifth Congress.

He was elected as a Whig to the Twenty-fifth Congress to fill the vacancy caused by the death of Francis Jacob Harper. There were allegations of fraud during the election against Charles J. Ingersoll. Local election officials certified Ingersoll as the winner while state officials declared Naylor the winner. Both candidates claimed victory and appeared in Washington D.C. to claim the seat. Congress declared Naylor the winner by 775 votes and he was sworn into office. He was reelected to the Twenty-sixth Congress. He declined to be a candidate for renomination in 1840. He resumed the practice of law.

In July 1844, during the Philadelphia nativist riots in Southwark, he prevented militia under the command of Gen. George Cadwalader from firing on a group of nativist protesters. Naylor and several others were arrested and held within a church. By the morning of July 7, most of the soldiers had left, but the crowds, led by an alderman and the sheriff, returned and demanded that the remaining guard release Naylor. Everyone except Naylor was released. The crowds grew, and a cannon was brought from a nearby wharf and used to threaten the church. After further negotiations, Naylor was released and carried home to cheers on people's shoulders.

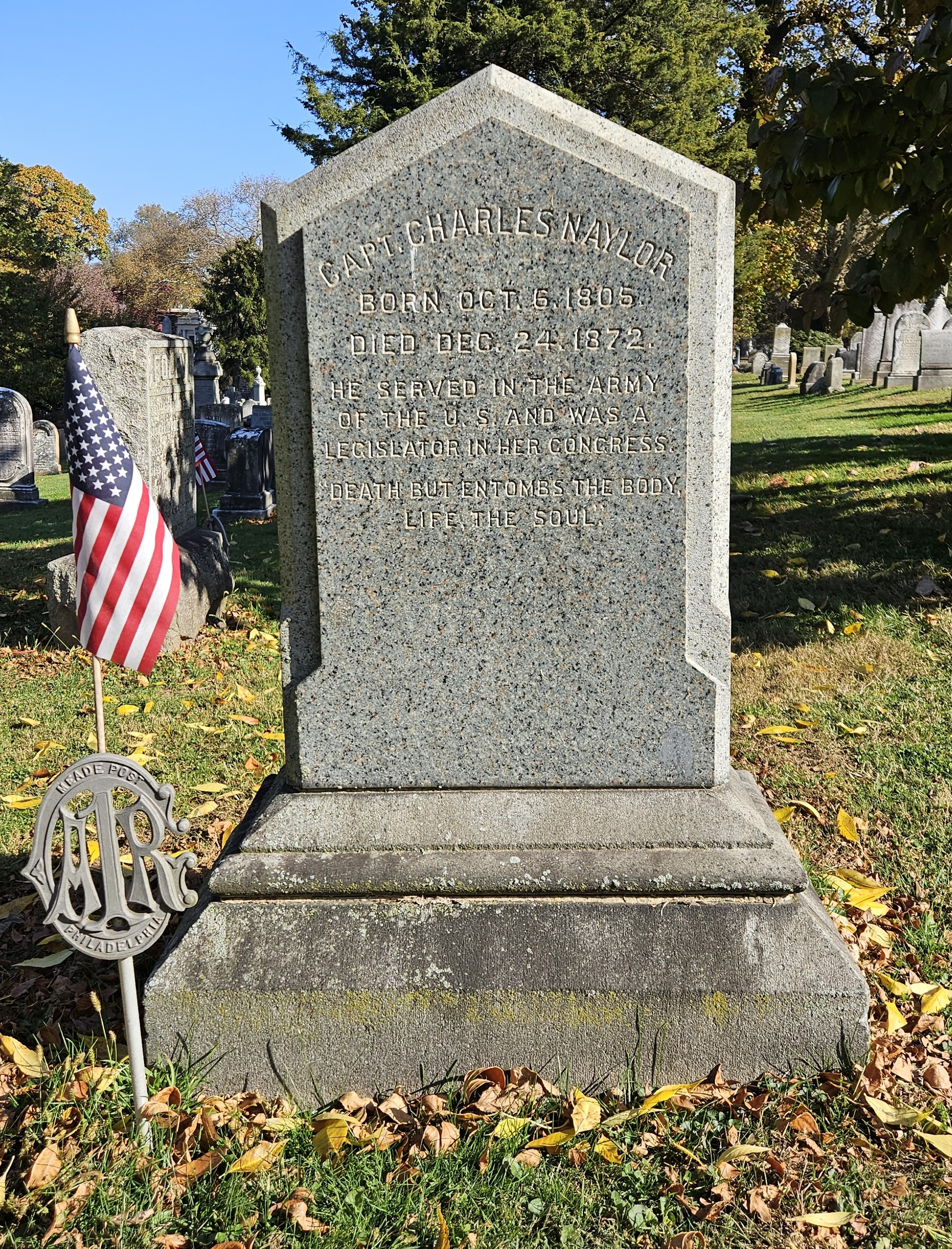
Charles Naylor gravestone in Laurel Hill Cemetery

During the Mexican–American War, Naylor raised a company of volunteers called the Philadelphia Rangers (also known as the "Killers and Bouncers") and served as captain. The company was praised by General Robert Patterson for their actions at the Battle of Cerro Gordo.

After the war he settled in Pittsburgh, Pennsylvania, and continued the practice of law. He returned to Philadelphia and practiced law. He died on December 24, 1872, and was interred in Laurel Hill Cemetery in Philadelphia.

== Published works ==
- Speech of Charles Naylor, of Pennsylvania, on the Bill Imposing Additional Duties as Depositaries, in Certain Cases on Public Officers. Delivered in the House of Representatives, United States, October 13, 1837., Washington: Printed at the Office of the National Register, 1837
- Speech of Charles Naylor, of Pennsylvania, on the Bill Imposing Additional Duties, as Depositaries, in Certain Cases, on Public Officers. Delivered in the House of Representatives, U.S., October 13, 1837, Philadelphia: King & Baird, Printers, 1862

U.S. House of Representatives
Preceded by Francis Jacob Harper	Member of the U.S. House of Representatives from Pennsylvania's 3rd congressional district June 29, 1837 – March 4, 1841	Succeeded by Charles Jared Ingersoll
