= Samuel Smith Harrison =

American politician

Samuel S. Harrison

Member of the U.S. House of Representatives from Pennsylvania's 23rd district
- In office March 4, 1833 – March 3, 1837
- Preceded by: District created
- Succeeded by: William Beatty

Personal details
- Born: 1780 Virginia
- Died: April 1853 (aged 72–73) Kittanning, Pennsylvania
- Party: Jacksonian

Samuel Smith Harrison (1780 – April 1853) was a member of the U.S. House of Representatives from Pennsylvania.

== Biography ==
Samuel Smith Harrison was born in Virginia in 1780. He studied law, was admitted to the bar and practiced. He moved to Kittanning, Pennsylvania.

He was elected as a Jacksonian to the Twenty-third and Twenty-fourth Congresses. He resumed the practice of law and died in Kittanning in 1853. Interment in Old Kittanning Cemetery.

== Sources ==
- United States Congress. "Samuel Smith Harrison (id: H000276)". Biographical Directory of the United States Congress.
- The Political Graveyard

U.S. House of Representatives
Preceded by District Created	Member of the U.S. House of Representatives from Pennsylvania's 23rd congressional district 1833–1837	Succeeded by William Beatty
