= Ebenezer Jackson Jr. =

American politician

Member of the U.S. House of Representatives from Connecticut's at-large district
- In office 1834–1835
- Preceded by: Samuel A. Foot
- Succeeded by: Andrew T. Judson

Member of the Connecticut House of Representatives
- In office 1829–1832

Personal details
- Born: January 31, 1796 Savannah, Georgia, U.S.
- Died: August 17, 1874 (aged 78) Middletown, Connecticut, U.S.
- Resting place: Indian Hill Cemetery
- Party: Anti-Jacksonian
- Education: Litchfield Law School

Ebenezer Jackson Jr. (January 31, 1796 – August 17, 1874) was a U.S. Representative from Connecticut.

Born in Savannah, Georgia, Jackson pursued academic studies. He was graduated from St. Mary's College (now known as Mount St. Mary's), near Baltimore, Maryland, in 1814. He studied law at the Litchfield Law School, Connecticut. He was admitted to the bar and commenced practice in Philadelphia, Pennsylvania, in 1821. He moved to Middletown, Connecticut, in 1826. He served as a member of the State house of representatives 1829–1832.

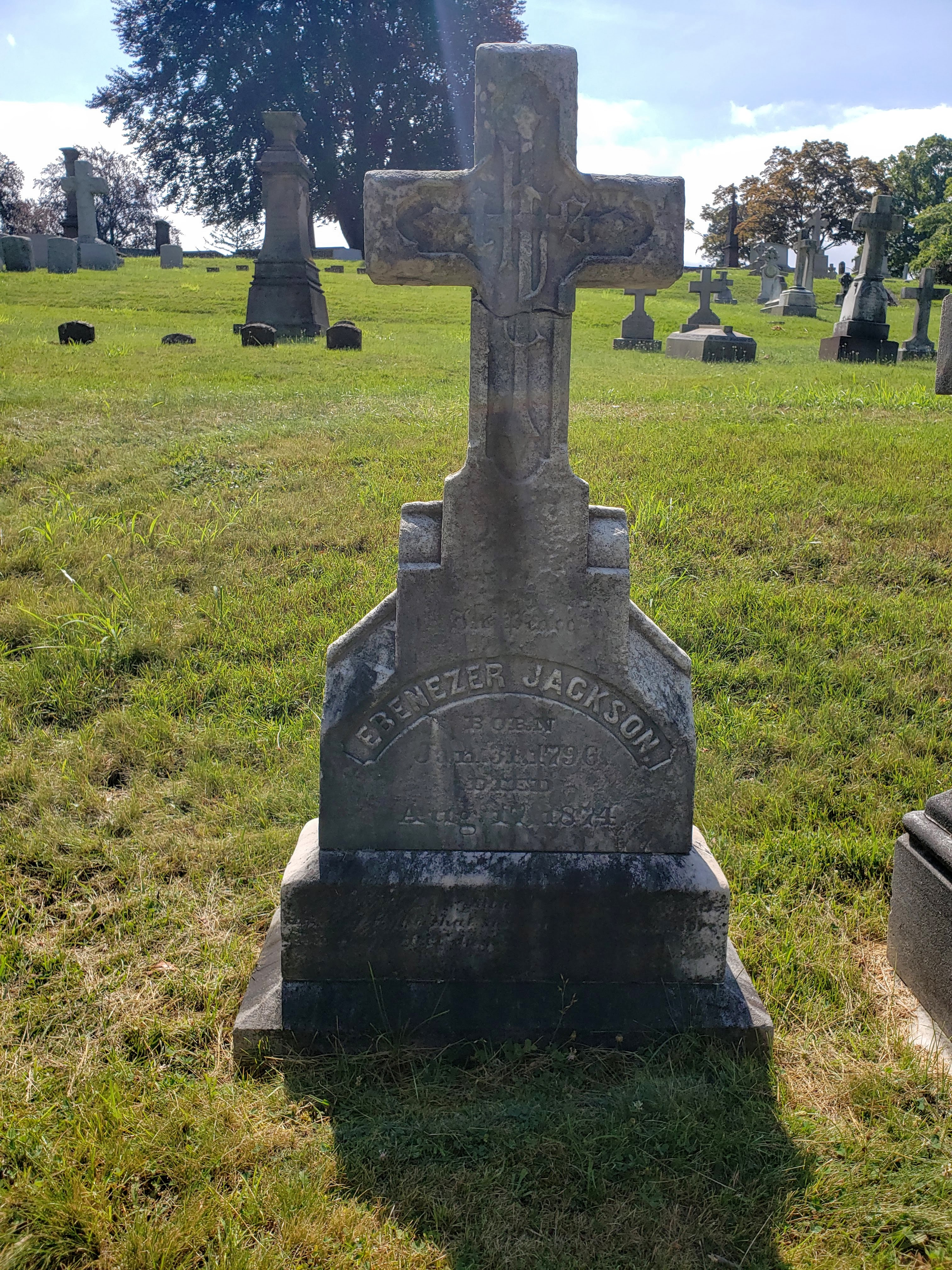
Ebenezer Jackson Jr. Gravestone

Jackson was elected as an Anti-Jacksonian candidate to the Twenty-third Congress to fill the vacancy caused by the resignation of Samuel A. Foote and served from December 1, 1834, to March 3, 1835. He was an unsuccessful candidate for reelection in 1834 to the Twenty-fourth Congress. He was again a member of the State house of representatives in 1849. He died in Middletown, Connecticut, August 17, 1874 and is interred in Indian Hill Cemetery.

U.S. House of Representatives
Preceded by Samuel A. Foot	Member of the U.S. House of Representatives from Connecticut's at-large congressional district 1834–1835	Succeeded by Andrew T. Judson
