= Michael Woolston Ash =

American politician

Member of the U.S. House of Representatives from Pennsylvania, Pennsylvania, US's 3rd district
- In office March 4, 1835 – March 4, 1837
- Preceded by: John G. Watmough
- Succeeded by: Francis J. Harper

Personal details
- Born: March 5, 1789 Philadelphia, Pennsylvania, US
- Died: December 14, 1858 (aged 69)
- Party: Jacksonian

Michael Woolston Ash (March 5, 1789 – December 14, 1858) was an American politician who served as a Jacksonian member of the U.S. House of Representatives for Pennsylvania's 3rd congressional district from 1835 to 1837.

Ash was born in Philadelphia. He studied law, was admitted to the bar on June 21, 1811, and commenced practice in Philadelphia. He served as a first lieutenant in the First Pennsylvania Volunteers during the War of 1812. At the close of the war, he relocated to Lancaster, where he went into a law partnership with James Buchanan, who later became the 15th President of the United States. He subsequently returned to Philadelphia and continued the practice of his profession there.

Ash was serving as a city alderman when he was elected as a Jacksonian to the Twenty-fourth Congress in 1834, defeating the Anti-Jacksonian incumbent John G. Watmough. He served one term from March 4, 1835, to March 3, 1837, and was not a candidate for renomination in 1836. After leaving Congress, he served as a United States Naval agent for four years before resuming the practice of law.

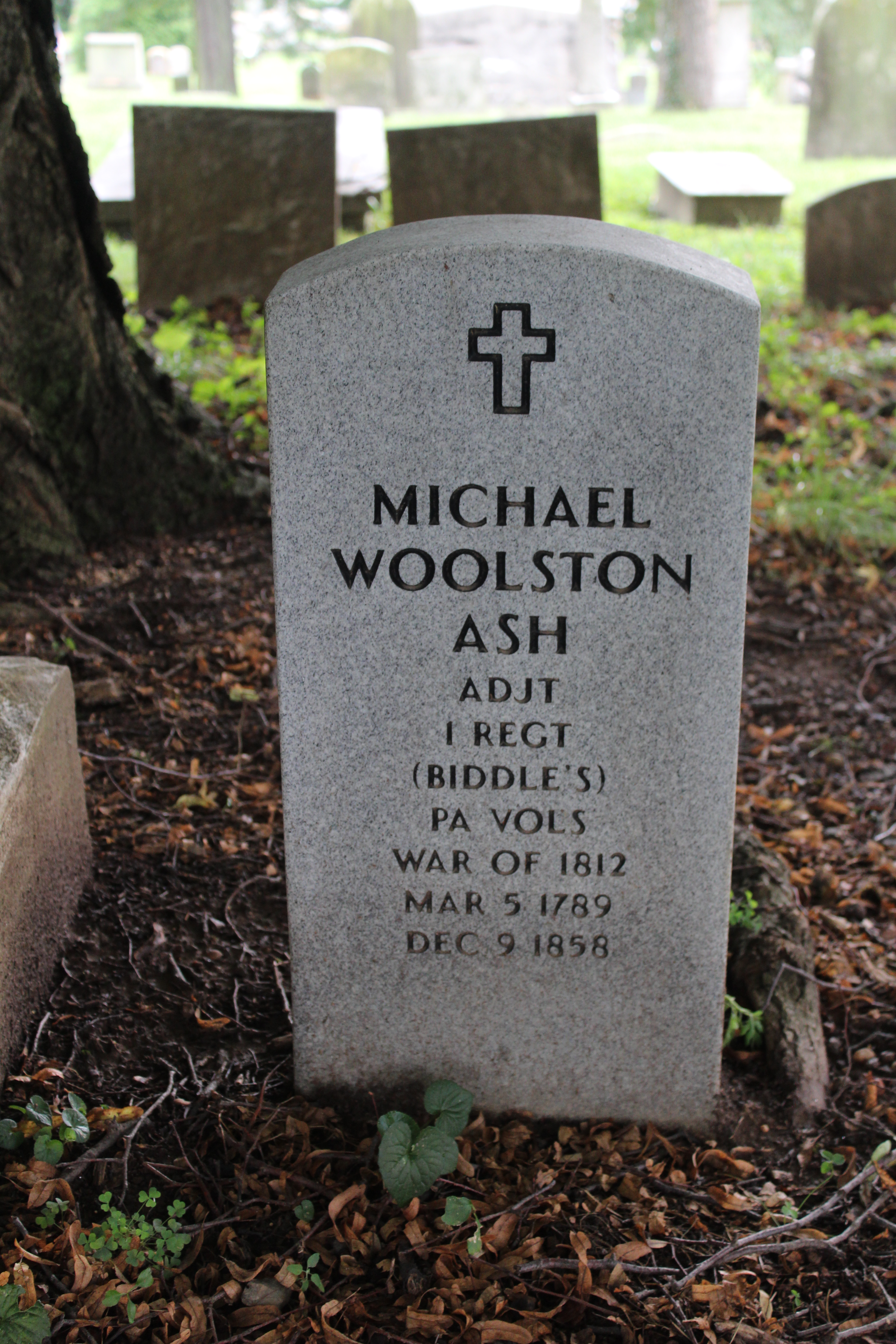
Michael Woolston Ash tombstone at Laurel Hill Cemetery

Ash died in Philadelphia on December 14, 1858. He was interred at Christ Church Burial Ground in Philadelphia and later re-interred at Laurel Hill Cemetery.

U.S. House of Representatives
Preceded by John G. Watmough	Member of the U.S. House of Representatives from Pennsylvania's 3rd congressional district 1835–1837	Succeeded by Francis J. Harper
