= John H. Brockway =

American politician

John Hall Brockway

Member of the U.S. House of Representatives from Connecticut's 6th district
- In office March 4, 1839 – March 3, 1843
- Preceded by: Orrin Holt
- Succeeded by: District Eliminated

Personal details
- Born: January 31, 1801 Ellington, Connecticut
- Died: July 29, 1870 (aged 69) Ellington, Connecticut
- Party: Whig
- Spouse: Flavia Feild Colton Brockway
- Education: Yale College Congregationalist in 1827
- Occupation: Lawyer; Teacher; Politician

John Hall Brockway (January 31, 1801 – July 29, 1870) was a U.S. representative from Connecticut.

== Biography ==
Born the son of the Reverend Diodate and Miranda Hall Brockway in Ellington, Connecticut, Brockway pursued preparatory studies. He then graduated from Yale College, ., in 1820, at the age of twenty. He taught school, and studied law in the office of Seth P. Staples, Esq. He was admitted to the bar in April 1823 and commenced practice in Ellington. On January 12, 1829, he married Flavia Feild Colton and they had three daughters.

== Career ==
From 1832 to 1838, Brockway served as member of the State House of Representatives. He was also a state senator in the Senate in 1834.

Brockway was elected as a Whig to the 26th and 27th United States Congress. He served from March 4, 1839 to March 3, 1843. He subsequently served as prosecuting attorney for Tolland County from August 1849 to April 1867, when he resigned for health reasons.

Shortly before the Civil War Brockway hosted a recent graduate of Yale College, Henry Billings Brown, to study law at his office. Brown later served on the Supreme Court of the United States from 1890 to 1906.

== Death ==
Brockway died in Ellington, Connecticut on July 29, 1870 (age 69 years, 179 days). He is interred at Ellington Center Cemetery.

U.S. House of Representatives
Preceded by Orrin Holt	Member of the U.S. House of Representatives from Connecticut's 6th congressional district March 4, 1839 – March 3, 1843	District abolished
