= Andrew T. Judson =

American judge (1784–1853)

Judge of the United States District Court for the District of Connecticut
- In office July 4, 1836 – March 17, 1853
- Appointed by: Andrew Jackson
- Preceded by: William Bristol
- Succeeded by: Charles A. Ingersoll

Member of the U.S. House of Representatives from Connecticut's at-large district
- In office March 4, 1835 – July 4, 1836
- Preceded by: Ebenezer Jackson Jr.
- Succeeded by: Orrin Holt

Personal details
- Born: Andrew Thompson Judson; November 29, 1784 Eastford, Connecticut
- Died: March 17, 1853 (aged 68) Canterbury, Connecticut, U.S.
- Resting place: Hyde Cemetery; Canterbury, Connecticut
- Party: Jacksonian Democrat
- Other political affiliations: Toleration
- Education: read law

Andrew Thompson Judson (November 29, 1784 – March 17, 1853) was a United States representative from Connecticut and a United States district judge of the United States District Court for the District of Connecticut. He also served in the Connecticut House of Representatives. He was a member of the Toleration Party and an officer of the American Colonization Society. A leading white supremacist, he led opposition to Prudence Crandall's school for African Americans in Connecticut and advocated for African Americans to be subjugated or sent to Africa. He also opposed the establishment of a college for African Americans in New Haven. As a judge in the United States v. The Amistad, he ruled the enslaved captives aboard La Amistad be released and returned to Africa.

== Education and early career ==
Judson was born on November 29, 1784, in Eastford, Windham County, Connecticut, the son of Elisabeth (Work) and Andrew Judson. Judson received limited schooling and read law in 1806. He was admitted to the bar and entered private practice in Montpelier, Vermont, from 1806 to 1809. He continued private practice in Canterbury, Connecticut, from 1809 to 1815, 1817 to 1819, and in 1834. He was Canterbury town clerk at the time of the Prudence Crandall affair, on which see below.

== Connecticut politician ==
He was a member of the Connecticut House of Representatives in 1816, and from 1822 to 1825. He was state's attorney for Windham County from 1819 to 1833. He was a member of the Connecticut Senate from 1830 to 1832.

=== Toleration Party ===
While in the Connecticut House of Representatives, Judson was one of the most active members of the Toleration Party, which had for its object disunion between church and state. After a severe struggle the Tolerationists, aided by the Democrats, succeeded in setting aside the charter that was granted by Charles II of England, and adopted the new Constitution of 1818, which remained in effect until 1965.

== White supremacist and colonizationist ==
Judson was the leading enemy of African Americans in the state of Connecticut. He believed that they were inferior to whites, and if not in use as slaves, should be moved to Africa, "where they came from". He was an officer of the American Colonization Society, which raised funds for the relocation of a few thousand African Americans to the land that became Liberia.

=== Proposed college for African Americans in New Haven ===
In 1831, minister Simeon Jocelyn proposed establishing a "colored" college in New Haven. At a town meeting called by Judson, the vote was 99% for rejection.

=== Led the opposition to Prudence Crandall's school for black girls ===
A similar incident soon followed in Judson's hometown, Canterbury. Although he had earlier welcomed Prudence Crandall's Canterbury Female Boarding School,, his support vanished when she accepted a black student and refused pressures to expel her. Judson, Canterbury's most famous and influential citizen, was the organizer of the pressures. "No other person in Connecticut was more fiercely opposed to Crandall's school for black women."

Samuel J. May's pamphlet protesting Judson's unjust treatment of "Colored" families

He got the Connecticut legislature to pass the "Black Law", prohibiting the teaching of blacks from outside of Connecticut. Crandall was arrested and spent a night in the county jail, a fact that was publicized. While he was only assistant prosecutor of Crandall's first trial, upon which the state's attorney for the county and the court's next choice, state Lieutenant Governor Ebenezer Stoddard, were suspiciously both "ill", since he was the only one of three prosecutors with knowledge of the case he called and questioned the witnesses, and gave the prosecution's closing argument. The jury was unable to reach a verdict. At her retrial he was no longer "assistant" prosecutor. She was found guilty, but upon appeal, the appeals court, apparently seeking a way to avoid taking a position, dismissed the case on a technicality. At this point opposition to Crandall's school became violent: an attempt to set the building on fire, an attack at night breaking all the windows. For her students' safety she closed the school, and left the state. Since 2014 she has been Connecticut's state heroine.

While this was going on, Judson explained his position to one of Crandall's supporters, the Brooklyn, Connecticut, abolitionist minister Samuel J. May:

Mr. May, we are not merely opposed to the establishment of that school in Canterbury; we mean there shall not be such a school set up anywhere in our State. The colored people never can rise from their menial condition in our country; they ought not to be permitted to rise here. They are an inferior race of beings, and never can or ought to be recognized as the equals of the whites. Africa is the place for them. I am in favor of the Colonization scheme. Let the niggers and their descendants be sent back to their fatherland and there improve themselves as much as they may, and civilize and Christianize the natives, if they can. ...You are violating the Constitution of our Republic, which settled forever the status of the black men in this land. They belong to Africa. Let them be sent back there, or kept as they are here. The sooner you Abolitionists abandon your project the better for our country, for the niggers, and yourselves.

Judson did appear as a character witness on behalf of Reuben Crandall, Prudence's brother, a physician who was arrested in Washington, D.C., for (illegally) possessing abolitionist literature and was nearly lynched. He did so because Reuben had recommended to Prudence that she abandon her plans to educate black girls in Connecticut. The prosecutor was Francis Scott Key, former partner of Roger Taney, who hoped to use the trial to advance the cause of colonization; he was a founding member of the American Colonization Society. After eight months in jail Reuben Crandall was found not guilty, but died shortly after of tuberculosis contracted in jail.

== U.S. representative and federal judge ==
Judson was elected as a Jacksonian Democrat from Connecticut's at-large congressional district to the United States House of Representatives of the 24th United States Congress and served from March 4, 1835, until July 4, 1836, when he resigned to accept a federal judicial appointment. Another source says that he was defeated for reelection. During that time the abolitionist, and mentor of Prudence Crandall, William Lloyd Garrison sent him a petition from 46 residents of Brooklyn, Connecticut, urging him to end slavery in the District of Columbia. Judson made no response.

Judson was nominated by President Andrew Jackson on June 28, 1836, to a seat on the United States District Court for the District of Connecticut vacated by Judge William Bristol. He was confirmed by the United States Senate on July 4, 1836, and received his commission the same day. His service terminated on March 17, 1853, due to his death in Canterbury. He was interred in Hyde Cemetery in Canterbury.

=== Amistad case ===
Judson presided over the famous case United States v. The Amistad in 1840. Given his views on race and slavery, Judson surprised many observers by ruling in favor of the captured Africans and ordering that they be freed and safely returned to their homes in Africa. The administration of President Martin Van Buren appealed Judson's ruling to the United States Supreme Court which upheld Judson's decision.

== Sources ==
- United States Congress. "Andrew T. Judson (id: J000279)". Biographical Directory of the United States Congress.
- Andrew Thompson Judson at the Biographical Directory of Federal Judges, a publication of the Federal Judicial Center.
- Wilson, J. G.; Fiske, J., eds. (1892). "Judson, Andrew Thompson" . Appletons' Cyclopædia of American Biography. New York: D. Appleton. This source gives Ashford as his place of birth. It also puts Judson in the Connecticut legislature by 1816, but doesn't say anything about his length of service there.

U.S. House of Representatives
Preceded by Ebenezer Jackson Jr.	Member of the U.S. House of Representatives from Connecticut's at-large congressional district 1835–1836	Succeeded by Orrin Holt
Legal offices
Preceded by William Bristol	Judge of the United States District Court for the District of Connecticut; 1836–1853	Succeeded by Charles A. Ingersoll
