= William Beatty (Pennsylvania politician) =

American politician (1787–1851)

Member of the U.S. House of Representatives from Pennsylvania's 23rd district
- In office March 4, 1837 – March 3, 1841
- Preceded by: Samuel S. Harrison
- Succeeded by: William Jack

Pennsylvania House of Representatives
- In office 1823-1826

Personal details
- Born: 1787 Stewartstown, County Tyrone, Kingdom of Ireland
- Died: April 12, 1851 (aged 63–64) Butler, Pennsylvania, U.S.
- Party: Democratic

William Beatty (1787 – April 12, 1851) was a member of the U.S. House of Representatives from Pennsylvania.

William Beatty was born in Stewartstown, County Tyrone in the Kingdom of Ireland in 1787. He immigrated to the United States in 1807 and settled in Butler, Pennsylvania. Beatty was a sergeant in Captain Thompson's company in the War of 1812. He served as sheriff of Butler County, Pennsylvania, from 1823 to 1826.

Beatty was elected as a Democrat to the Twenty-fifth and Twenty-sixth Congresses. He was a member of the Pennsylvania House of Representatives from 1840 to 1842. He appointed deputy sheriff of Butler County and died in Butler in 1851. Interment in the Old Butler Cemetery.

U.S. House of Representatives
Preceded by Samuel S. Harrison	Member of the U.S. House of Representatives from Pennsylvania's 23rd congressional district 1837–1841	Succeeded by William Jack
