= Francis Jacob Harper =

American politician

Francis Jacob Harper (March 5, 1800 – March 18, 1837) was an American politician from Pennsylvania who served as a Democratic member of the Pennsylvania House of Representatives from 1832 to 1833, the Pennsylvania State Senate for the 2nd district from 1834 to 1836 and as representative-elect to the U.S. House of Representatives for Pennsylvania's 3rd congressional district. He died before Congress was called to session.

== Early life ==
Francis J. Harper was born in Frankford, Philadelphia, Pennsylvania, to Jacob and Susannah (Deal) Harper.

== Career ==
He was a member of the Pennsylvania House of Representatives from 1832 to 1833, and served in the Pennsylvania State Senate from 1834 to 1836.

Harper was elected as a Democrat to the Twenty-fifth Congress, but died in Frankford in 1837, before the assembling of Congress.

== See also ==
- List of members of the United States Congress who died in office (1790–1899)

== Sources ==
- United States Congress. "Francis Jacob Harper (id: H000220)". Biographical Directory of the United States Congress.
- The Political Graveyard

U.S. House of Representatives
Preceded by Michael W. Ash	Member of the U.S. House of Representatives from Pennsylvania's 3rd congressional district 1837	Succeeded by Charles Naylor
Pennsylvania State Senate
Preceded by George N. Baker	Member of the Pennsylvania Senate, 2nd district 1834-1836	Succeeded by James McConkey
