= Lucas P. Thompson =

American lawyer, judge & politician (1797–1866)

Lucas K. Thompson

Judge of Circuit Court for Augusta County
- In office 1831–1866

Member of the Virginia House of Delegates from the Delaware district
- In office December 7, 1829 – December 5, 1830 Serving with Samuel M. Garland
- Preceded by: Josiah Ellis
- Succeeded by: Samuel M. Garland

Member of the Virginia House of Delegates from the Amherst district
- In office December 4, 1826 – November 30, 1829 Serving with William M. Waller
- Preceded by: David S. Garland
- Succeeded by: Josiah Ellis

Personal details
- Born: 1797 Nelson County, Virginia, US
- Died: April 21, 1866 (aged 68–69) Staunton, Virginia, US
- Party: Whig
- Spouse(s): Susanna Caroline Tapscott (m. 1828; died 1853) Arabella Stuart White (m. 1855; died 1858) Catharine S. Carrington (m. 1860)
- Children: 8
- Parents: John Thompson (father); Rebecca Edwards Powell (mother)
- Education: Hampden-Sydney College
- Profession: lawyer, educator, politician, judge

Lucas Keith Thompson (1797–1866) was an Ohio lawyer, politician, educator and judge for more than 35 years, who died before he could assume a seat on the Court of Appeals.

== Early and family life ==
Born at "Farmer's Joy" in Nelson County, Virginia, to Irish immigrant and Revolutionary War veteran John Thompson (1755–1828) and his wife Rebecca Edwards Powell (1769– ), Lucas Thompson was one of nine children. He attended Hampden-Sydney College, and took a walking tour of Spain when he was 18.

Thompson married three times. He married his first wife, Susanna Caroline Tapscott (1802–1853), in Staunton, Augusta County, Virginia, on January 15, 1828. They had eight children, including six daughters who survived both their parents. One son Lucas Powell Thompson (1830–1854) barely survived his mother, and their only other son, John Baker Thompson (1834–1862), died at the Battle of Shiloh. After his first wife's death, Thompson married Arabella Stuart White (1820–1858, the daughter of the court clerk in Romney, Hampshire County (then in Virginia and on his judicial circuit, after the Civil War in West Virginia) in 1855. After her death, he married Catharine S. Carrington (1825–1893) in Halifax, Virginia on August 5, 1860, and she survived him. Although one modern blogger claims Judge Thompson had no slaves until this third marriage with one of the First Families of Virginia, U.S. census records show he owned 18 slaves in the 1850 census, and a decade earlier had owned 13 slaves.

== Career ==
After finishing his education, and perhaps reading law with his elder brother James Powell Thompson (1792–1882, who moved to Tennessee), Thompson moved to Amherst County, Virginia, and practiced law, as well as served several terms in the Virginia House of Delegates, two alongside William M. Waller and later with Samuel M. Garland. Voters of Albemarle, Amherst, Nelson, Fluvanna and Goochland counties elected Thompson as one of their four delegates to the Virginia Constitutional Convention of 1829–1830, alongside James Pleasants, William F. Gordon and Thomas Massie Jr. Following that Constitution's ratification, the Virginia General Assembly elected Thompson as a county judge in Staunton, Virginia, and he succeeded Archibald Stuart in 1831. He served on that court for many years, and was re-elected to that post by the legislature. After the Virginia Constitutional Convention of 1850, the county court was reconstituted as the 11th circuit court, and Thompson also elected to that position (and re-elected many times). Before the conflict, Judge Thompson operated the Staunton Law School, a private law school (1839–1849), mostly at the mansion, "Hilltop", he built in Staunton in 1842. He remained in office during the American Civil War, although he despised Abraham Lincoln. His son John Baker Thompson (1834–1862) died at the Battle of Shiloh. His nephew John Lucas Thompson (1833–1866) captained Company C of the 16th Tennessee Infantry and barely survived the war.

During the war's final days, Judge Thompson recommended a Peace Commission, and signed the oath of allegiance afterward, reputedly on the recommendation of Gen. Robert E. Lee. After the war, Governor Francis Pierpont nominated Judge Thompson, who had opposed succession, to the Court of Appeals, but Judge Thompson was already ill when the General Assembly elected him to that position on February 22, 1866.

== Death and legacy ==
Judge Thompson died at his Staunton home on April 21, 1866, before assuming that office. His widow remarried, to her widower cousin, Dr. Paul Jones Carrington, and was ultimately buried near Mt.Laurel, Virginia. She sold his home to Mary Baldwin College in 1872, and it was restored in 1991. The Library of Virginia has some of his papers.
