= Samuel Crowdson Williams =

American politician

Samuel Croudson Williams
- Born: September 13, 1812; Woodstock, Virginia, U.S.
- Died: May 12, 1862 (aged 49); Woodstock, Virginia, U.S.
- Occupation: Clerk
- Title: Delegate, Clerk

Samuel Croudson Williams (September 13, 1812 – May 12, 1862) was a nineteenth-century American politician from Virginia.

== Early life ==
Williams was born in Woodstock, Virginia in 1812.

== Career ==
The Virginia Capitol at Richmond VA where 19th century Conventions met

As an adult, Williams made his home in Shenandoah County.

Williams was appointed Deputy Clerk of Shenandoah County for ten years, and Clerk from 1845-1862 at his death.

From 1841-1843, Williams was elected to the General Assembly.

An active partisan Democrat, Williams was a delegate to the National Democratic Convention of 1844, 1848, 1852 and 1856.

In 1850, Williams was elected to the Virginia Constitutional Convention of 1850. He was one of four delegates elected from the Valley delegate district made up of his home district of Shenandoah County as well as Hardy and Warren Counties.

Williams was an officer of the Manassas Gap Railroad Company.

Williams was elected to the Virginia Secession Convention of 1861 and voted for secession.

During the American Civil War, Williams was elected the captain of a rifle company that he commanded at Harper’s Ferry.

== Death ==
Samuel Croudson Williams died in Woodstock, Virginia on May 12, 1862.

== Bibliography ==
- "How Virginia Convention delegates voted on secession, April 4 and April 17…" (PDF). Union or Secession. Library of Virginia.
- Pulliam, David Loyd (1901). The Constitutional Conventions of Virginia from the foundation of the Commonwealth to the present time. John T. West, Richmond. ISBN 978-1-2879-2059-5.
