= Arthur R. Smith =

American politician

- Born: November 8, 1805; Suffolk, Virginia, U.S.
- Died: September 16, 1865 (aged 59); Catonsville, Maryland, U.S.
- Education: University of Virginia
- Occupation: Doctor
- Title: state Senator, Delegate

Arthur R. Smith (November 8, 1805 – September 16, 1865) was a nineteenth-century American medical doctor and politician from Virginia.

== Early life ==
Smith was born in Suffolk, Virginia. He was educated in local county schools, and received a Medical Doctorate from the University of Virginia in 1825-1826.

== Career ==
The Virginia Capitol at Richmond VA where 19th century Conventions met

As an adult, Smith lived in Norfolk County, Virginia (now Chesapeake) and practiced medicine there at Deep Creek. He attended medical lectures in Philadelphia in 1848.

Smith was elected to the Virginia state Senate, and in 1856 relocated his practice to Portsmouth.

In 1850, Smith was elected to the Virginia Constitutional Convention of 1850. He was one of four delegates elected from the southeastern delegate district made up of his home district of Norfolk County, Norfolk City and Princess Anne County.

Elected to the Virginia Senate for the session 1852/53, Smith was reelected for the 1853/54 session.

Smith was a member of the Democratic National Convention of 1860 at Charleston, South Carolina. Elected to the Virginia Secession Convention of 1861, he voted for secession.

During the American Civil War, Smith was banished from Portsmouth by General Benjamin Butler. Smith ran the blockade, and served in Confederate hospitals in Richmond, Virginia, and Farmville.

== Death ==
Arthur R. Smith died on September 16, 1865, in Catonsville, Maryland, shortly after moving there following his Confederate hospital service.

== Bibliography ==
- Pulliam, David Loyd (1901). The Constitutional Conventions of Virginia from the foundation of the Commonwealth to the present time. John T. West, Richmond. OCLC 6407098.
- Swem, Earl Greg (2016) [1st Pub. 1918]. A Register of the General Assembly of Virginia, 1776-1918, and of the Constitutional Conventions. David Bottom, Superintendent of Public Printing. ISBN 978-1-3714-6242-0.
