= Samuel Watts (politician) =

American politician

- Born: 1799; Portsmouth, Virginia, U.S.
- Died: 1878 (aged 78–79); Portsmouth, Virginia, U.S.
- Occupations: Lawyer, Soldier
- Title: Delegate, UVA Visitor

Samuel Watts (November 28, 1799 – May 17, 1878) was a nineteenth-century American politician from Virginia.

== Early life ==
Watts was born in Portsmouth, Virginia.

== Career ==
The Virginia Capitol at Richmond VA where 19th century Conventions met

As an adult, Watts lived in Norfolk County, Virginia (now Chesapeake) and practiced law there. He was elected to the House of Delegates almost continuously from 1833 to 1850. There he established himself as a noted parliamentarian. Watts was an ardent Whig, and was chosen a delegate to the Whig National Conventions of 1844, 1848, 1852, 1856 and 1860.

In 1850, Watts was elected to the Virginia Constitutional Convention of 1850. He was one of four delegates elected from the southeastern delegate district made up of his home district of Norfolk County, Norfolk City and Princess Anne County.

A conditional Unionist, Watts declined nomination to the Virginia Secession Convention of 1861. During the American Civil War, he served briefly as an aide de camp to Major General Walter Grogan beginning in April 1861, but he resigned because of advanced age.

Following the Civil War, Watts served on the Board of Visitors at the University of Virginia, and was re-elected to the General Assembly from Norfolk County for the term in 1871–1872 following the Constitution of 1870.

== Death ==
Samuel Watts died on May 17, 1878, in Norfolk County, Virginia.

== Bibliography ==
- Pulliam, David Loyd (1901). The Constitutional Conventions of Virginia from the foundation of the Commonwealth to the present time. John T. West, Richmond. ISBN 978-1-2879-2059-5.
