= John R. Edmunds =

American politician

- Born: August 26, 1812; Halifax County, Virginia, U.S.
- Died: 1873 (aged 60–61); Halifax County, Virginia, U.S.
- Education: University of Virginia
- Occupation: Lawyer
- Title: Delegate

John R. Edmunds (August 26, 1812 – May 7, 1873) was a nineteenth-century American politician from Virginia.

== Early life ==
Edmunds was born in Halifax County, Virginia in 1812, and graduated from the University of Virginia with a Bachelor of Arts in 1828-31.

== Career ==
The Virginia Capitol at Richmond VA where 19th century Conventions met

As an adult, Edmunds, a planter at his family plantation “Redfield”. He studied law and established a law practice in Halifax County.

In the 1830s and 1840s, Edmunds served as a member of the Virginia House of Delegates, for the sessions of 1836/37, 1838 (January), 1839 (January), 18442/43, 1843/44, 1844/45, 1845/46.

In 1850, Edmunds was elected to the Virginia Constitutional Convention of 1850. He was one of six delegates elected from the Southside delegate district made up of his home district of Halifax County, as well as Pittsylvania and Mecklenburg Counties.

Edmunds was reelected to the House of Delegates for the sessions 1855/56 and 1857/58.

He was a member of the Virginia Agricultural Society for many years and served as its president.

== American Civil War ==
During the American Civil War, Edmunds was elected under the Confederate regime to the Virginia House of Delegates for the sessions of 1861/62, 1862 (April), 1862 (September) and 1863 (January).

== Death ==
John R. Edmunds died at "Redfield" Plantation, Halifax County on May 7, 1873.

== Bibliography ==
- Pulliam, David Loyd (1901). The Constitutional Conventions of Virginia from the foundation of the Commonwealth to the present time. John T. West, Richmond. ISBN 978-1-2879-2059-5.
- Swem, Earl Greg (1918). A Register of the General Assembly of Virginia, 1776-1918, and of the Constitutional Conventions. David Bottom, Superintendent of Public Printing. ISBN 978-1-3714-6242-0.
