= Edward Chambers =

Edward, Ed, or Eddie Chambers is the name of:

- Edward T. Chambers (1930–2015), executive director of the Industrial Areas Foundation
- Edward R. Chambers (1795–1872), American politician from Virginia
- Eddie Chambers (born 1982), American boxer
- Eddie Chambers (artist) (born 1960), British artist
- Edward Chambers (footballer), see 2004–05 Hong Kong First Division League
- Edward Chambers (MP) for Calne
