= Senator Finney =

Senator Finney may refer to:

- Darwin Abel Finney (1814–1868), Pennsylvania State Senate
- David Wesley Finney (1839–1916), Kansas State Senate
- Florence Finney (1903–1994), Connecticut State Senate
- Louis C. H. Finney (1822–1884), Virginia State Senate
- Lowe Finney (born 1975), Tennessee State Senate
- Raymond Finney (born 1941), Tennessee State Senate

== See also ==
- Senator Finley (disambiguation)
