= Walter Daniel Leake =

American politician

- Born: January 25, 1813; Goochland County, Virginia, U.S.
- Died: 1873 (aged 59–60) near Goochland County, Virginia, U.S.
- Education: Hampden-Sydney College, University of Virginia, College of William and Mary
- Occupations: Lawyer, Soldier
- Title: Delegate, Commonwealth's Attorney

Walter Daniel Leake (January 25, 1813 – February 20, 1873) was a nineteenth-century American politician from Virginia.

== Early life ==
Leake was born on Rocky Spring Plantation in Goochland County, Virginia in 1813. He graduated from the Hampden-Sydney College with a Bachelor of Arts degree in 1832, from University of Virginia in 1833, and from the College of William and Mary with a Bachelor of Laws in 1836.

== Career ==
The Virginia Capitol at Richmond VA where 19th century Conventions met

As an adult, Leake established a law practice in Goochland County.

He was elected a member of the House of Delegates in 1842.

In 1850, Leake was elected to the Virginia Constitutional Convention of 1850. He was one of four delegates elected from the central Piedmont delegate district made up of his home district of Goochland County, as well as Fluvanna and Louisa Counties.

He was elected a member of the House of Delegates for a second term in 1854.

Leake served in the Virginia Secession Convention of 1861. A secessionist, he voted for secession before Lincoln's call up of Virginia militia to restore Federal property.

During the American Civil War, although Leake was over the conscripted military age at 48, he raised a company of artillery for the Confederate cause and commanded it for the first year of war.

In 1865 Leake returned to his law practice and subsequently served as Commonwealth's Attorney in Goochland County for nearly twenty years.

== Death ==
Walter Daniel Leake died at "Rocky Spring" plantation, Goochland County, Virginia on February 20, 1873.

== Bibliography ==
- Pulliam, David Loyd (1901). The Constitutional Conventions of Virginia from the foundation of the Commonwealth to the present time. John T. West, Richmond. ISBN 978-1-2879-2059-5.
