= Albert G. Pendleton =

American politician

- Born: 1809; Culpeper County, Virginia, U.S.
- Died: 1875 (aged 65–66); Giles County, Virginia, U.S.
- Occupation: Lawyer
- Title: Delegate

Albert G. Pendleton (January 30, 1809 – 1875) was a nineteenth-century American politician from Virginia. Pendleton served multiple terms in the Virginia House of Delegates and was elected to the Virginia Constitutional Convention of 1850.

== Early life ==
Pendleton was born in Culpeper County, Virginia in 1809. He entered the United States Military Academy in 1825, but left on account of illness.

== Career ==
The Virginia Capitol at Richmond VA, where 19th century Conventions met

As an adult, Pendleton settled in Tazewell County, Virginia and began a law practice. Later he was appointed Commonwealth’s Attorney there.

In 1833, Pendleton moved to Giles County and served in the Virginia House of Delegates from Giles in the 1840s sessions of 1843/44, 1845/46, and 1849/50.

In 1850, Pendleton was elected to the Virginia Constitutional Convention of 1850. He was one of three delegates elected from the transmontane delegate district made up of his home district of Giles County as well as Mercer, Tazewell, and Monroe Counties.

In the 1850s, Pendleton was elected to the House of Delegates from Giles and Mercer Counties for the session 1855/56, declined Democratic nomination for Lieutenant Governor in 1855, and was a presidential elector in 1856.

Then following the American Civil War, Pendleton was reelected a Delegate for the sessions 1865/66 and 1866/67 during Virginia’s Presidential Reconstruction.

== Death ==
Albert G. Pendleton died in Giles County, Virginia in 1875.

== Bibliography ==
- Pulliam, David Loyd (1901). The Constitutional Conventions of Virginia from the foundation of the Commonwealth to the present time. John T. West, Richmond. OCLC 6407098.
- Swem, Earl Greg (1918). A Register of the General Assembly of Virginia, 1776-1918, and of the Constitutional Conventions. David Bottom, Superintendent of Public Printing. OCLC 8089721.
