= Drury W. K. Bowles =

American politician

- Born: January 29, 1802; Fluvanna County, Virginia, U.S.
- Died: 1885 (aged 82–83) near Fluvanna County, Virginia, U.S.
- Occupations: Judge, Soldier
- Title: Justice of the Peace, Colonel, Delegate

Drury W. K. Bowles (January 29, 1802 – August 11, 1885) was a nineteenth-century American politician from Virginia.

== Early life ==
Bowles was born in Fluvanna County, Virginia in 1802.

== Career ==
The Virginia Capitol at Richmond VA where 19th century Conventions met

As an adult, Bowles made his home in Fluvanna County.

At the age of seventeen in 1819 Bowles was elected captain of the Fluvanna County militia, and later served as the regiment’s major and colonel. In 1826 he commanded the troops escorting Lafayette on his visit to Fluvanna.

Bowles was appointed Justice of the Peace in Fluvanna County in 1824, and served as presiding judge there until after the American Civil War, including under the Confederate regime.

In 1850, Bowles was elected to the Virginia Constitutional Convention of 1850. He was one of three delegates elected from the central Piedmont delegate district made up of his home district of Fluvanna County, as well as Goochland and Louisa Counties.

Bowles was elected to the House of Delegates for the session 1857/1858.

After the American Civil War, Bowles was re-elected to the House of Delegates for two terms, 1865/1866 and 1866/1867 during Presidential Reconstruction.

== Death ==
Drury W. K. Bowles died in, Fluvanna County, Virginia on August 11, 1885.

== Bibliography ==
- Pulliam, David Loyd (1901). The Constitutional Conventions of Virginia from the foundation of the Commonwealth to the present time. John T. West, Richmond. ISBN 978-1-2879-2059-5.
- Swem, Earl Greg (1918). A Register of the General Assembly of Virginia, 1776-1918, and of the Constitutional Conventions. David Bottom, Superintendent of Public Printing. ISBN 978-1-3714-6242-0.
