= Senator Cocke =

Senator Cocke may refer to:

- John Alexander Cocke (1772–1854), Tennessee State Senate
- Richard I. Cocke (1820–1873), Virginia State Senate
- William Cocke (1748–1828), U.S. Senator from Tennessee from 1796 to 1797

== See also ==
- Townsend D. Cock (1838–1913), New York State Senate
