= James H. Cox =

American politician

James Henry Cox
- Born: 1810; Chesterfield County, Virginia, U.S.
- Died: 1877 (aged 66–67); Chesterfield County, Virginia, U.S.
- Education: Hampden-Sydney College
- Occupations: Teacher, Businessman, Lawyer,
- Title: State Senator, Delegate, Judge

James H. Cox (February 16, 1810 – February 18, 1877) was a nineteenth-century American judge, businessman and politician from Virginia.

== Early life ==
Cox was born in Chesterfield County, Virginia. in 1810 and graduated from Hampden-Sydney College in 1829.

== Career ==
The Virginia Capitol at Richmond VA where 19th century Conventions met

As an adult, Cox first moved to Tallahassee, Florida, where he was a professor at the academy there. Three years later he returned to Chesterfield County, Virginia.

On his return, Cox was installed as president of the Clover Hill Coal Mining Company and worked there for many years at the Clover Hill Pits in Chesterfield County. The company delivered its ore by railroad to Richmond for export to Northern states in the 1840s before a market developed locally.

Cox was elected to the Virginia House of Delegates for many years, and to the Senate of Virginia for one term.

In 1850, Cox was elected to the Virginia Constitutional Convention of 1850. He was one of four delegates elected from the central Piedmont delegate district made up of his home district of Chesterfield County, Petersburg City and Prince George County.

Cox was a member of the Virginia Secession Convention of 1861, he voted for secession at both votes before and after Lincoln's call for militia to retake captured Federal property.

Cox was the magistrate and presiding justice of Chesterfield County for many years, and judge of the County Court from 1869 to 1875 under the new Constitution of 1870.

== Death ==
James Henry Cox died on February 18, 1877, in Chesterfield County.

== Bibliography ==
- Pulliam, David Loyd (1901). The Constitutional Conventions of Virginia from the foundation of the Commonwealth to the present time. John T. West, Richmond. ISBN 978-1-2879-2059-5.
