= Senator Meredith =

Senator Meredith may refer to:

- Elisha E. Meredith (1848–1900), Virginia State Senate
- John A. Meredith (1814–1882), Virginia State Senate
- Stephen Meredith (politician) (born 1953), Kentucky State Senate
- Wesley Meredith (born 1963), North Carolina State Senate
