= John E. Shell =

American politician

- Born: 1800; Brunswick County, Virginia, U.S.
- Died: 1865 (aged 64–65); Brunswick County, Virginia, U.S.
- Occupation: Lawyer
- Title: Delegate

John E. Shell (December 25, 1800 – January 20, 1865) was a nineteenth-century American lawyer and politician from Virginia. Shell served as a Commonwealth's attorney, a member of the Virginia House of Delegates, and as a member of the Virginia Constitutional Convention of 1850.

== Early life ==
Shell was born in Brunswick County, Virginia in 1800, and received a common school education there.

== Career ==
The Virginia Capitol at Richmond VA where 19th century Conventions met

As an adult, Shell established a successful law practice in Brunswick County despite his lack of formal education.

Shell served as a Delegate in the Virginia General Assembly for many years from Brunswick County, and was also appointed Commonwealth’s Attorney continuously during his career.

In 1850, Shell was elected to the Virginia Constitutional Convention of 1850. He was one of three delegates elected from the Southside delegate district made up of his home district of Brunswick County, as well as Lunenburg, Nottoway and Dinwiddie Counties.

During the American Civil War, Flood served under the Confederate regime as Commonwealth’s Attorney of Brunswick County from 1861 until his death.

== Death ==
John E. Shell died in Brunswick County, Virginia on January 21, 1865.

== Bibliography ==
- Pulliam, David Loyd (1901). The Constitutional Conventions of Virginia from the foundation of the Commonwealth to the present time. John T. West, Richmond. ISBN 978-1-2879-2059-5.
