= John Woolfolk =

American politician (1797–1859)

- Born: 1797; Orange County, Virginia, U.S.
- Died: 1859 (aged 61–62); Orange County, Virginia, U.S.
- Education: College of William and Mary
- Occupation: Lawyer
- Title: Delegate, state Senator

John Woolfolk (1797 – January 22, 1859) was a nineteenth-century American politician from Virginia.

== Early life ==
Woolfolk was born on "Pear Grove" plantation in Orange County, Virginia in 1797. He graduated from the College of William and Mary in 1819, and later from the B. L. Laughton Law School.

== Career ==
The Virginia Capitol at Richmond VA where 19th century Conventions met

As an adult, Woolfolk made his home in Orange County practicing law.

Woolfolk served in the Virginia House of Delegates for several years, then the state Senate for two terms.

In 1850, Woolfolk was elected to the Virginia Constitutional Convention of 1850. He was one of three delegates elected from the central Piedmont delegate district made up of his home district of Orange County, as well as Culpeper, Greene and Madison Counties.

== Death ==
John Woolfolk died in Orange County, Virginia on January 22, 1859.

== Bibliography ==
- Pulliam, David Loyd (1901). The Constitutional Conventions of Virginia from the foundation of the Commonwealth to the present time. John T. West, Richmond. ISBN 978-1-2879-2059-5.
