= James A. Jones =

American politician

- Born: June 30, 1820; Mecklenburg County, Virginia, U.S.
- Died: February 26, 1894 (aged 73); Richmond, Virginia, U.S.
- Education: Randolph-Macon College
- Occupation: Lawyer,
- Title: state Senator, Delegate

James Alfred Jones (June 3, 1820 – February 26, 1894) was an American politician from Virginia.

== Early life ==
Jones was born in Mecklenburg County, Virginia. In 1820, he graduated from Randolph-Macon College. In 1839, he attained a Master of Arts from the University of Virginia.

== Career ==
The Virginia Capitol at Richmond VA where 19th century Conventions met

After studying law in Richmond, Jones settled in Petersburg, Virginia, where he practiced law.

In 1850, Jones was elected to the Virginia Constitutional Convention of 1850. He was one of four delegates elected from the central Piedmont delegate district made up of his home district of Petersburg City, and Chesterfield and Prince George Counties.

Jones was a member of the Virginia State Senate 1853/54 and reelected for the session 1855/56.

After his relocation to Richmond in 1857, he received an honorary Doctorate of Laws from Richmond College.

== Death ==
James A. Jones died on February 27, 1894, in Richmond City, Virginia.

== Bibliography ==
- Pulliam, David Loyd (1901). The Constitutional Conventions of Virginia from the foundation of the Commonwealth to the present time. John T. West, Richmond. ISBN 978-1-2879-2059-5.
- Swem, Earl Greg (1918). A Register of the General Assembly of Virginia, 1776-1918, and of the Constitutional Conventions. David Bottom, Superintendent of Public Printing. ISBN 978-1-3714-6242-0.
