= Samuel M. Garland =

- Born: November 15, 1812; Amherst County, Virginia, U.S.
- Died: 1880 (aged 67–68); Amherst County, Virginia, U.S.
- Education: College of William and Mary
- Occupation: Lawyer
- Title: Delegate, County Clerk

Samuel M. Garland (November 15, 1812 – 1880) was a nineteenth-century lawyer and political figure from Virginia. Garland was the Clerk of Court for Amherst County and was elected to the Virginia Constitutional Convention of 1850 and the Virginia Secession Convention of 1861.

== Early life ==
Garland was born on Kenmore Plantation in Amherst County, Virginia in 1812. He graduated from the College of William and Mary in 1824–25.

== Career ==
The Virginia Capitol at Richmond VA where 19th century Conventions met

As an adult, Garland studied law and established a practice in Amherst County. He was Clerk of the Court there from 1830 until 1864, serving then under the Confederate regime. He was a lay reader in the Protestant Episcopal Church.

In 1850, Garland was elected to the Virginia Constitutional Convention of 1850. He was one of four delegates elected from the central Piedmont delegate district made up of Amherst County, and neighboring Nelson and Albemarle Counties.

Garland served in the Virginia Secession Convention of 1861. A secessionist, he voted for secession before Lincoln's call up of Virginia militia to restore Federal property.

== Death ==
Samuel M. Garland died in Amherst County, Virginia in 1880.

== Bibliography ==
- Pulliam, David Loyd (1901). The Constitutional Conventions of Virginia from the foundation of the Commonwealth to the present time. John T. West, Richmond. ISBN 978-1-2879-2059-5.
