= Richard I. Cocke =

American politician

- Born: August 13, 1820; Powhatan County, Virginia, U.S.
- Died: 1873 (aged 52–53); Blandville, Kentucky, U.S.
- Education: University of Virginia, College of William and Mary
- Occupations: Lawyer, soldier
- Title: Delegate, Captain

Richard I. Cocke (August 13, 1820 – August 30, 1873) was a nineteenth-century American politician from Virginia.

== Early life ==
Cocke was born in Powhatan County, Virginia in 1820. He graduated from the University of Virginia in 1836–37, and earned a Bachelor of Laws from the College of William and Mary in 1839.

== Career ==
The Virginia Capitol at Richmond VA where 19th century Conventions met

As an adult, Cocke made his home in Fluvanna County beginning in 1844, and served there for many years as Commonwealth's Attorney.

At the age of twenty-nine, Cocke was elected to the Virginia House of Delegates 1849–50.

In 1850, Cocke was elected to the Virginia Constitutional Convention of 1850. He was one of three delegates elected from the central Piedmont delegate district made up of his home district of Fluvanna County, as well as Goochland and Louisa Counties.

During the American Civil War, Cocke served as a Captain of artillery, C.S.A.

Cocke was elected as a Virginia State Senator after the war, then afterwards he removed to Blandsville in Ballard County, Kentucky.

== Death ==
Richard I. Cocke died in Blandsville, Kentucky on August 30, 1873.

== Bibliography ==
- Pulliam, David Loyd (1901). The Constitutional Conventions of Virginia from the foundation of the Commonwealth to the present time. John T. West, Richmond. ISBN 978-1-2879-2059-5.
