= Virginia Constitutional Convention of 1850 =

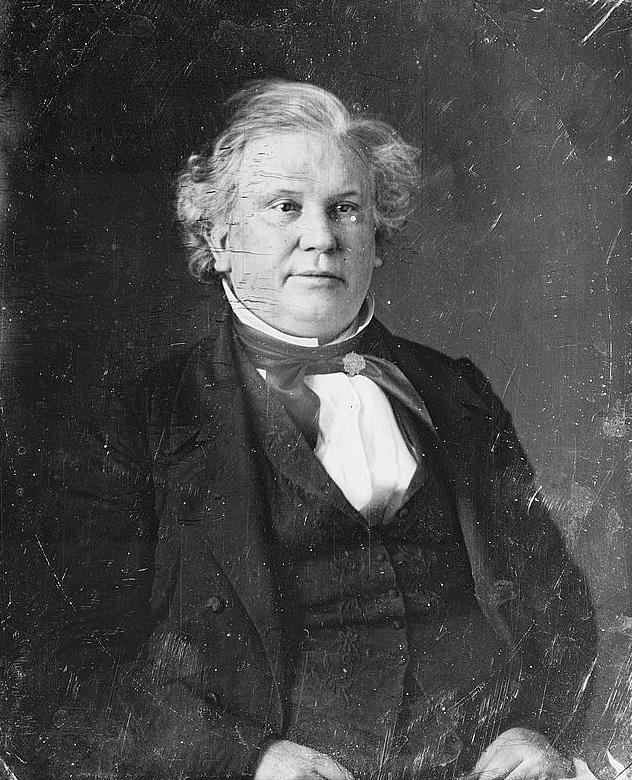
John Y. Mason 1850 Presiding officer

The Virginia Constitutional Convention of 1850 was an assembly of elected delegates chosen by the voters to write the fundamental law of Virginia. It is known as the Reform Convention because it liberalized Virginia political institutions.

== Background and composition ==
Following the 1830 Constitution, Virginia began to change politically under the pressure of party competition. The Old Republican gentry rule supported by their local county freeholders began to be replaced by partisan lawyers of state's rights Democrats and commercially minded Whigs, though the planter elite and their representatives in the ruling Democratic "Richmond Junto" continued to resist any change. Democrats were divided between easterners who supported an apportionment in the General Assembly based on a mixed basis of population and property which favored their slave-holding counties. Democrats in the west, while agreeing with anti-federal government Doctrines of '98 and states' rights, were more inclined to a white population basis. The Whigs were more united statewide in their insistence to expand suffrage and find a more equitable reapportionment between east and west sections.

The General Assembly malapportionment was a perpetual irritant in Virginia's politics, and in December 1849 Democrat John B. Floyd became the fourth governor to call for a Constitutional Convention to reform the Constitution of 1830. Although the Assembly complied, the planter Richmond Junto succeeded in extending the existing Assembly apportionment for the Convention representation. While the western counties held more than half of the white population, the eastern Piedmont and Tidewater sections held over sixty percent in the Virginia Senate.

Most states reformed their earlier Constitutions to embrace white manhood suffrage and white population apportionment in state legislatures. Instead of the earlier colonial "stake in society", they placed a democratic faith in the people's ability to govern themselves in a democracy. But only in Virginia did the reactionary basis remain a mixed basis of population and property to reflect the "majority of interest" in slaves. Indeed, even reformers in the "Reform Convention" of 1850 spent most of their time explaining that their innovations would not threaten the institution of slavery in Virginia. The Convention delegates were a younger generation raised in the Second American Party System of Democrat Jefferson Davis and Whig Henry Clay. Unlike the three generation Convention of 1829–30, they were primarily in their twenties and thirties at the beginning of their careers in the professions and industry, without large land holdings, without gentry family ties.

== Meeting and debate ==
The Convention met from October 14, 1850 - August 1, 1851, and elected John Y. Mason its presiding officer.

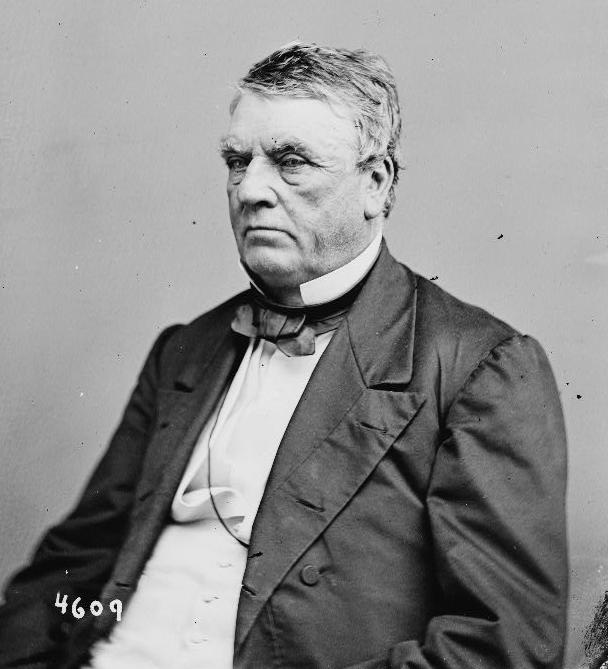
John Minor Botts
Reformer for more voters

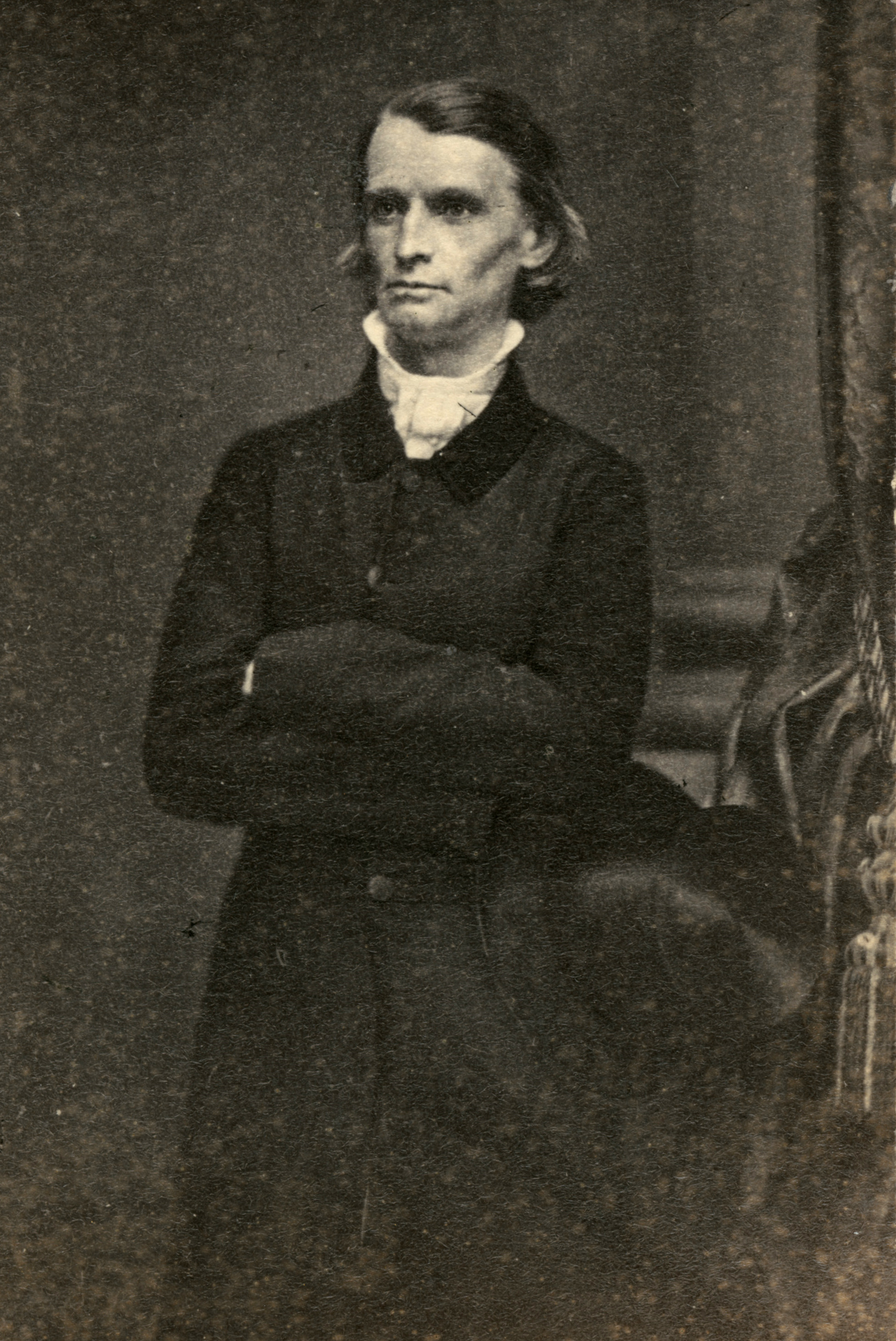
Henry A. Wise
Protect slavery first

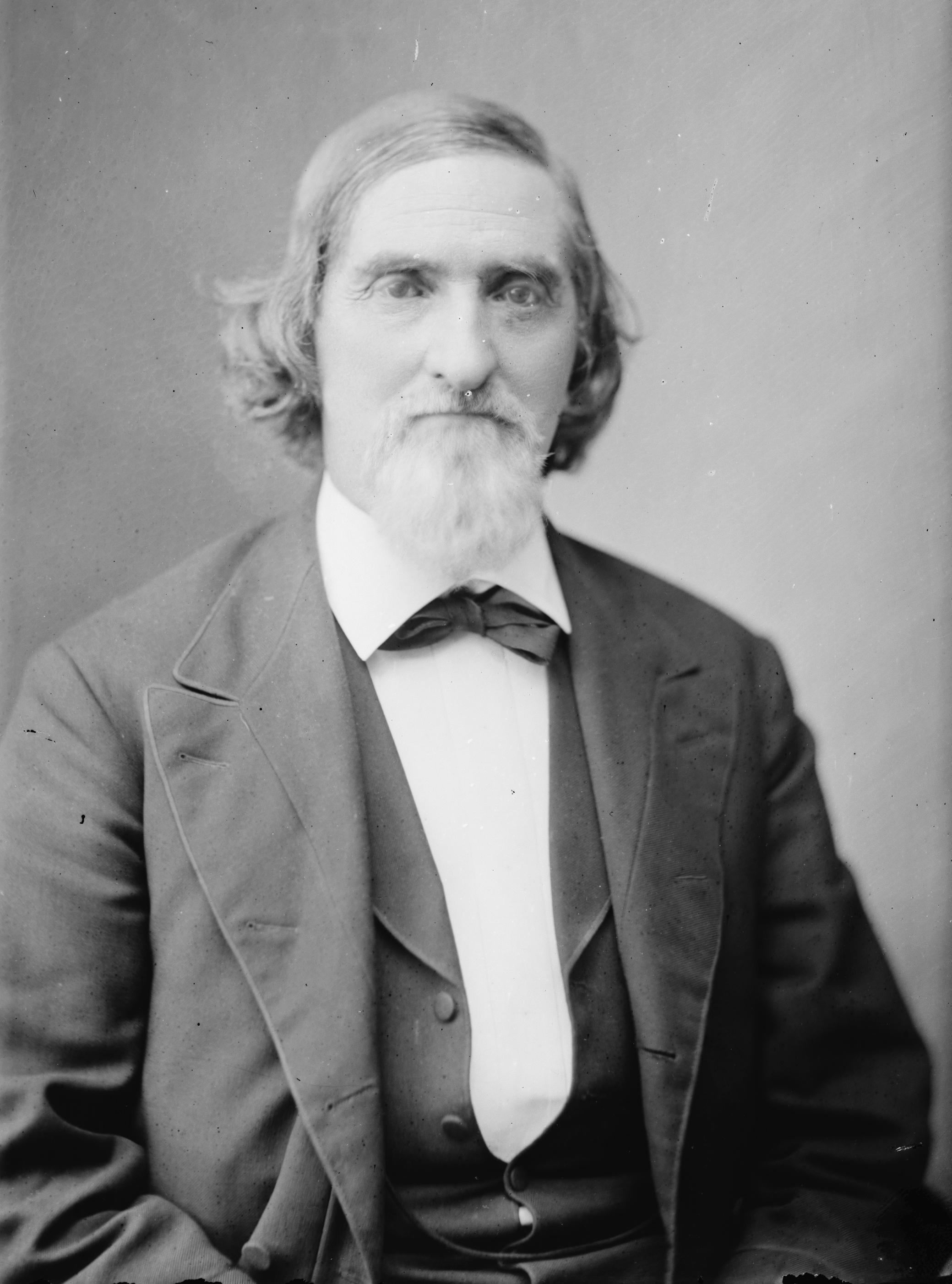
Richard L.T. Beale
in ruling Richmond Junta

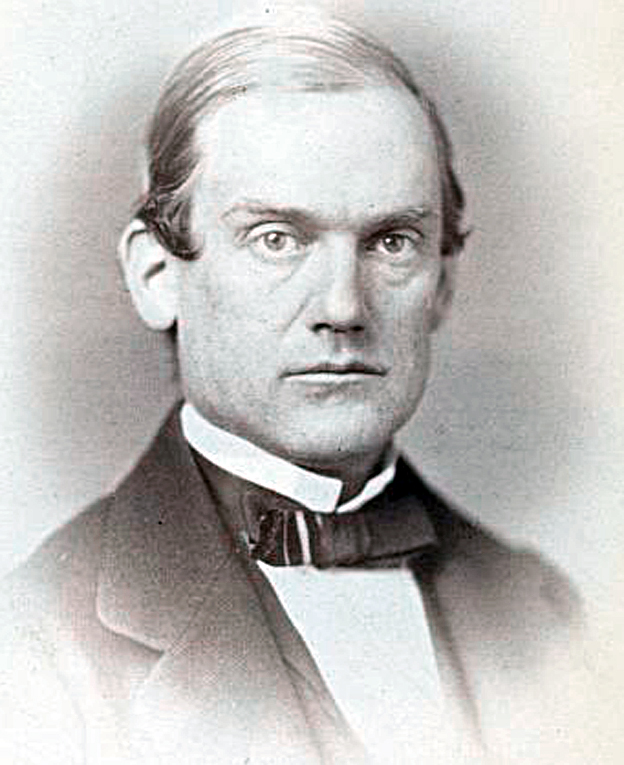
Muscoe Garnett
no state improvements

The Convention featured fierce debates, the arguments raged throughout Virginia in the press and they were widely reported nationally. Direct popular election of governor was supported by Whig Congressman John Minor Botts. He was opposed by Richmond Junta Democrat Richard L.T. Beale who argued against the natural equality of all men, and the "plundering propensities" of the multitude seeking a "majority of mere numbers". Although for direct election of Governor, Henry A. Wise was more fearful of the eastern slave-holders loss of control in the General Assembly. He believed that "protection of slavery, not the liberalizing of Virginia's Constitution, was the most significant business before the convention." Albert G. Pendleton suggested that nearly 100,000 citizens of the western counties were disenfranchised by the 1830 Constitution, and that malapportionment led to the lack of internal improvements needed in west. Muscoe R.H. Garnett opposed expanding the franchise to prohibit internal improvements that might benefit the western counties. James Barbour objected to extending the franchise to white westerners because support for outright emancipation had originated from there in the past. Even with proposals for freed slave expatriation to Africa, Barbour doubted any assurances from the west for the long run preservation of slavery.

After almost six months of wrangling, the question of apportionment was brought up for a vote. The plan for representation in both houses on a mixed basis failed, and the plan for representation in both houses on a population basis failed. The compromise was for the House of Delegates to be on the white population basis, giving the western counties a majority, and for the Senate to be on a modified mixed basis of population and property including slaves, giving the eastern counties a majority. In the remaining two months of the convention, it was agreed to allow direct popular election of the governor, but each office holder would be limited to one term. Constitutional provision for public education was voted down. Voting by secret ballot was rejected, perpetuating the voting vive voce aloud.

== Outcomes ==
Capitol at Richmond VA, where Convention of 1850 met

The powerful Assembly-appointed Governor's Council was abolished and a popular elected Lieutenant Governor was created. Most radically, judges on the Supreme Court of Appeals, in district courts, and county justices of the peace were to be elected by the expanded electorate. Three classes of taxation were linked so that an increase in one required the same increase on all, applicable to poll tax on whites, land taxes and slave taxes. In a measure to advantage slave owners, taxes were set for adult slaves at $300 each when the unskilled field hand was valued twice as much in Virginia. The state legislature lost its statutory ability to manumit slaves, and it was enabled to pass legislation prohibiting individual owner manumissions of their slaves.

Over three days' balloting in October 1851, the new Constitution was overwhelmingly approved by 75,748 for with 11,060 against. Property requirements for voting were abolished and Virginia state government had the democratic form of Jacksonian America at last. Yet the Richmond Junto leadership of state's rights Democratic rule remained nearly as powerful as ever.

== Chart of Delegates ==
The delegates to the Virginia Convention of 1850-1851 – elected on the fourth Thursday in August, 1850. (One hundred and thirty-five members, from each Delegate District

District	Name	County
Accomack and Northampton		
	Louis C. H. Finney	Accomack
	Henry A. Wise	Accomack
Norfolk City, Norfolk County and Princess Anne		
	Samuel Watts	Norfolk County (Chesapeake)
	John Petty	---
	Arthur R. Smith	Norfolk County (Chesapeake)
	Tazewell Taylor	Norfolk City
	John Tunis	---
Southampton, Nansemond, Isle of Wight, Sussex, Surry and Greensville		
	Robert Ridley	---
	John R. Chambliss, Sr.	Greensville
	John Y. Mason	Southampton
	A. S. H. Burgess	Southampton
Petersburg, Chesterfield and Prince George		
	James H. Cox	Chestefield
	Thomas Wallace	Petersburg
	Timothy Rives	---
	James A. Jones	Petersburg
Richmond City, Henrico, New Kent and Charles City		
	Robert G. Scott	Richmond City
	John A. Meredith	Richmond City
	John M. Botts	Henrico
	James Lyons	Richmond City
	Robert C. Stanard	Richmond City
	Hector Davis	Richmond City
Williamsburg, James City, Gloucester, Warwick, York and Elizabeth City		
	Lemuel J. Bowden	Williamsburg
	Robert McCandlish	---
Essex, King and Queen, Middlesex and Mathews		
	Muscoe R. H. Garnett	Essex
	James Smith	---
Caroline, Spotsylvania, King William and Hanover		
	Francis W. Scott	---
	Corbin Braxton	King William
	Eustace Conway	Spotsylvania
	Beverly B. Douglas	King William
	Edward W. Morris	Hanover
Richmond County, Westmoreland, King George, Lancaster and Northumberland		
	Richard L.T. Beale	Westmoreland
	Samuel L. Straughan	---
	Addison Hall	---
Prince William, Alexandria, Fairfax and Stafford		
resigned	Richard C. L. Moncure	Prince William
	Daniel Jasper	Prince William
	William L. Edwards	Fairfax
	Edgar Snowden	Alexandria
	Ira Williams	---
Henry, Franklin and Patrick		
	William Martin	Henry
	Nathaniel C. Claiborne	Franklin
	Archibald Stuart	Patrick
Halifax, Pittsylvania and Mecklenburg		
	William M. Tredway	Pittsylvania
	John R. Edmunds	Halifax
	James M. Whittle	Pittsylvania
	William O. Goode	Mecklenburg
	Edward R. Chambers	Mecklenburg
	George W. Purkins	---
Prince Edward, Charlotte, Appomattox		
	Willis Perry Bocock	Appomattox
	Branch J. Worsham	Prince Edward
	Thomas H. Flood	Appomattox
Lunenburg, Brunswick, Nottoway and Dinwiddie		
	John E. Shell	Brunswick
	Robert D. Turnbull	---
	James L. Scoggins	---
Cumberland, Amelia, Powhatan and Buckingham		
	John Hill	Buckingham
	Joseph Fuqua	---
	Henry L. Hopkins	Powhatan
Campbell and Bedford		
	Charles H. Lynch	Campbell
	Gustavus A. Wingfield	Bedford
	Lewis C. Arthur	---
	James Saunders	---
Nelson, Amherst and Albemarle		
	Samuel M. Garland	Amherst
	Valentine W. Southall	Albemarle
	Thomas Jefferson Randolph	Albemarle
	Littleberry N. Ligon	---
Goochland, Fluvanna and Louisa		
	Walter Daniel Leake	Goochland
	Drury W. K. Bowles	Fluvanna
	Richard I. Cocke	Fluvanna
Culpeper, Greene, Madison and Orange		
	James Barbour	Culpeper
	Robert A. Banks	---
	John Woolfolk	Orange
Loudoun		
	John A. Carter	Loudoun
	John Janney	---
	Robert J. T. White	Bedford
Fauquier and Rappahannock		
	Robert Eden Scott	Fauquier
	James F. Strother	Rappahannock
	Samuel Chilton	Fauquier
Botetourt, Roanoke, Alleghany and Bath		
	Fleming B. Miller	Botetourt
	John T. Anderson	Botetourt
	William Watts	Roanoke
Augusta, Rockbridge and Highland		
	John Letcher	Prince William
	David E. Moore	Rockbridge
	Hugh W. Sheffey	Augusta
	Adam Stephenson, Jr.	Highland
	David Fultz	---
Rockingham, Pendleton and Page		
	John Kenney	Rockingham
	George E. Deneale	---
	A. M. Newman	---
	John Lionberger	---
Shenandoah, Hardy and Warren		
resigned	Green B. Samuels	Shenandoah
	Mark Bird	Shenandoah
	William Seymour	---
	Giles Cook	Warren
	Samuel Crowdson Williams	Shenandoah
Jefferson, Berkeley and Clarke		
	Charles James Faulkner, Sr.	Berkeley
	William Lucas	Jefferson
	Dennis Murphey	---
	Andrew Hunter	Jefferson
Frederick, Hampshire and Morgan		
	James E. Stewart	Morgan
	Thomas Sloan	---
	Richard E. Byrd	---
	Charles Blue	---
Brooke, Ohio, Hancock and Marshall		
	Jefferson T. Martin	---
	Zachariah Jacob	---
	John Knote	---
	Thomas M. Gally	---
Doddridge, Wetzel, Harrison, Tyler, Wood and Richie		
	Joseph Johnson	Harrison
	John F. Snodgrass	Wood
	Gideon D. Camden	---
	Peter G. Van Winkle	Wood
Marion, Preston, Monongalia and Taylor		
	William G. Brown	Preston
	Edward J. Armstrong	Campbell
	Waitman T. Willey	Monongalia
	James Neeson	Marion
Randolph, Lewis, Barbour, Gilmer, Braxton, Wirt and Jackson		
	Samuel L. Hays	---
	Joseph Smith	---
	John S. Carlile	Barbour
	Thomas Bland	---
Cabell, Mason, Putnam, Wayne, Boone, Wyoming and Logan		
	Elisha M. McComas	---
	Henry J. Fisher	---
	James H. Ferguson	---
Greenbrier, Pocahontas, Fayette, Raleigh, Nicholas and Kanawha		
	George W. Summers	Kanawha
	Samuel Price	Greenbrier
	William Smith	Greenbrier
	Benjamin H. Smith	Kanawha
Carroll, Grayson, Floyd, Montgomery and Pulaski		
	Daniel H. Hoge	Montgomery
	Samuel Mc. Camant	---
	Benjamin F. Wysor	---
Mercer, Giles, Tazewell and Monroe		
	Augustus A. Chapman	Monroe
	Allen T. Caperton	Monroe
	Albert G. Pendleton	Giles
Smythe, Wythe and Washington		
	Benjamin Rush Floyd	Wythe
resigned	George W. Hopkins	---
	Connally F. Trigg	Washington
	Thomas M. Tate	---
Scott, Russell and Lee		
	Samuel V. Fulkerson	Scott
	Hiram Kilgore	---
	Dale Carter	---

== See also ==
- Virginia Conventions

== Bibliography ==
- Andrews, Matthew Page (1937). Virginia, the Old Dominion. Doubleday, Doran & Company. ASIN B0006E942K.
- Dinan, John (2014). The Virginia State Constitution: a reference guide. Oxford University Press. ISBN 9780199355747.
- Heinemann, Ronald L. (2008). Old Dominion, New Commonwealth: a history of Virginia, 1607-2007. University of Virginia Press. ISBN 978-0-8139-2769-5.
- Pulliam, David Loyd (1901). The Constitutional Conventions of Virginia from the foundation of the Commonwealth to the present time. John T. West, Richmond. ISBN 978-1-2879-2059-5.
- Shade, William G. (1996). Democratizing the Old Dominion: Virginia and the Second Party System, 1824–1861. University of Virginia Press. ISBN 978-0-8139-1654-5.
- Van Schreeven, William J. (1967). The conventions and constitutions of Virginia 1776-1966. Virginia State Library. OCLC 49308578.
- Wallenstein, Peter (2007). Cradle of America: a history of Virginia. University Press of Kansas. ISBN 978-0-7006-1994-8.
