= David E. Moore =

American politician

- Born: 1789; Rockbridge County, Virginia, U.S.
- Died: 1875 (aged 85–86); Virginia, U.S.
- Education: Washington College
- Occupation: Lawyer
- Title: Delegate, Commonwealth Attorney

David E. Moore (1789 – 1875) was a nineteenth-century American politician from Virginia.

== Early life ==
Moore was born in Rockbridge County, Virginia in 1798.

== Education ==
Moore was educated at Washington College where graduated in 1817.

== Career ==
Moore was elected to the Virginia General Assembly from Rockbridge County.

From 1843-75 Moore was the Commonwealth’s Attorney of Rockbridge County, serving through the American Civil War under the Confederate regime.

In 1850, Moore was elected to the Virginia Constitutional Convention of 1850. He was one of five delegates elected from the Valley delegate district made up of his home district of Rockbridge County as well as Augusta and Highland Counties.

Moore served as a trustee of Washington College 1845-75.

== Death ==
Moore lived in Rockbridge County.

David E. Moore died in Virginia in 1875.
