= Eustace Conway (politician) =

American judge (1820–1857)

Member of the Virginia House of Delegates from Spotsylvania County
- In office December 6, 1847 – December 1, 1850
- Preceded by: Alexander R. Holladay
- Succeeded by: Oscar M. Crutchfield

Personal details
- Born: 1820 Stafford County, Virginia, U.S.
- Died: 1857 (aged 36–37) Fredericksburg, Virginia, U.S.
- Occupation: lawyer, politician, judge

Eustace Conway (September 19, 1820 – May 20, 1857) was a Virginia lawyer, politician and judge.

== Early life and education ==
Conway was born in Stafford County, Virginia in February 1820, the only son of Sara Storke Peyton and her husband, John Moncure Conway, who had long served as the county clerk. Later biographies differ as to his birth date, with variants including September 14, 17 and 19. Although this man would protect slaveholding, his nephew Moncure Daniel Conway would become an outspoken abolitionist and left the Commonwealth.

Conway received a private education appropriate to his class and read law under the guidance of his brother in law Richard C. L. Moncure, who would eventually become a judge on what later would be called the Virginia Supreme Court.

== Career ==
Admitted to the Virginia bar, Conway practiced law in Fredericksburg, and neighboring in Spotsylvania County. His law practice thrived. By 1850 Conway owned four taxable slaves and two town lots valued at $4900.

Although Conway may have initially sympathized with the Whig party, as shown by him serving as secretary of an April 1841 Fredericksburg meeting to mark the death of President William Henry Harrison (whose ancestors like Conway's were of the First Families of Virginia), he became an ardent Democrat.

Spotsylvania County voters elected Conway to represent them in the Virginia House of Delegates in 1847 (a part-time position), and re-elected him twice, so he served until 1850. He initially served on the Committees of Privileges and Elections and of Schools and Colleges, and in his second term served on the Committee of Roads and Internal Navigation, as well as chaired the Committee on the Banks of the Commonwealth. When in response to the Mexican-American War, an amendment was twice (unsuccessfully) proposed to ban slavery from the territory thereby acquired, Conway moved that Virginia's General Assembly declare that Congress had no power to legislate respecting slavery and that Southern states would view any Congressional attempt to legislate against slavery as a direct attack. That bill passed the House a week later by a vote of 117 to 13. Conway's high-profile concerning slavery and the revision of Virginia's criminal code (as one of the committee managers and later as floor manager) earned him a place on the Committee for Courts of Justice during his final legislative term.

In 1850, voters in Spotsylvania County, as well as neighboring Caroline, King William, and Hanover Counties, elected Conway as one of their five regional representatives in the Virginia Constitutional Convention of 1850. Only two of ten other candidates received more votes. Fellow delegate Corbin Braxton had also served in the legislature and Beverley B. Douglas would soon serve, though this would be the only statewide service of Francis W. Scott and Edward W. Morris. Conway served on the important Committee on the Basis and Apportionment of Representation, where Conway opposed reforms advocated by western delegates, especially extending suffrage to all white males regardless of property qualification and to reapportion the General Assembly on the basis of that suffrage rather than including slaveholdings, Conway missed about thirty days of the nearly year-long convention, and did not vote in the committee of the whole on a key reapportionment compromise and opposed the legislative compromise of May 21. On July 31, 1851, he voted with the minority who opposed ratification of the constitution that would be ratified later that year.

In 1849, Conway was appointed to the Board of Visitors of the College of William and Mary, on which he would serve for several years. He also taught at Fredericksburg's Methodist Episcopal church for many years and led the city's Young Men's Christian Association. In 1852, Conway attended the Democratic National Convention in Baltimore. Some gave him credit for suggesting the Virginia delegation support Franklin Pierce, who won the presidential nomination on the 34th ballot. Following Pierce's election, Conway chaired a committee that invited James Buchanan to Fredericksburg to celebrate the victory. Conway also attended the 1856 Democratic National Convention in Cincinnati. Conway ran for election to Fredericksburg's city council in March 1855, but all the seats were swept by members of the Know-Nothing Party. Conway also promoted the city's economic development as director of the Fredericksburg Water Power Company beginning in 1854, and as president of the city's branch of the Bank of Virginia from 1854 until he resigned in early 1857.

On February 19, 1857, Conway was elected as judge of the 8th Virginia Judicial Circuit (which consisted of the counties he had represented in the Constitutional Convention as well as Essex, King and Queen, King George, Lancaster, Richmond and Westmoreland Counties in the Northern Neck of Virginia), filling the vacancy caused by the resignation of Judge John Tayloe Lomax. However, shortly after he held his first court session, Conway experienced a sore in his left cheek which was diagnosed as cancer and eventually killed him, despite treatment in Baltimore that may have included removal of part of his lower jaw.

== Personal life ==
In 1842, Conway married Maria Tayloe Tomlin of Northumberland County. They would have three sons (one born after his father's death) and two daughters.

== Death ==
Eustace Conway died at his Fredericksburg home on May 20, 1857. He was buried in the Fredericksburg city cemetery. Artist John Adams elder drew a portrait of Conway which was sold as a lithograph in local stores for $1 each.
