= Senator Finley =

Senator Finley may refer to:

- David E. Finley (1861–1917), South Carolina State Senate
- Hugh F. Finley (1833–1909), Kentucky State Senate
- Jesse J. Finley (1812–1904), Arkansas State Senate and Florida State Senate
- Morgan M. Finley (1925–2016), Illinois State Senate

== See also ==
- Senator Finney (disambiguation)
