= Louis C. H. Finney =

American politician

- Born: 1822; Accomack County, Virginia, U.S.
- Died: 1884 (aged 61–62); Accomack County, Virginia, U.S.
- Education: Washington College, Pennsylvania, Harvard University
- Occupations: Lawyer, Soldier
- Title: Delegate, state Senator, Lieutenant Colonel CSA

Louis C. H. Finney (June 22, 1822 – May 21, 1884) was a nineteenth-century American politician and Confederate Lieutenant Colonel from Virginia.

== Early life ==
Finney was born at Onancock in Accomack County, Virginia, and graduated from the Washington College, Pennsylvania. He studied law at Harvard University.

== Career ==
The Virginia Capitol at Richmond, Virginia, where 19th-century Conventions met

As an adult, Finney lived in Accomack County, Virginia, and practiced law there. He was elected to the House of Delegates for the sessions 1848/49, 49/50, 50/51.

In 1850, Taylor was elected to the Virginia Constitutional Convention of 1850. He was one of two delegates elected from the Eastern Shore delegate district made up of his home district of Accomack County and Norhthampton County.

During the American Civil War, Finney served as a lieutenant colonel in the 39th Virginia Infantry, Confederate States Army.

Following Reconstruction, Finney was elected to the Senate of Virginia for the sessions of /1874, 1874/75, 1875/76 and 1876/77.

== Death ==
Louis C. H. Finney died on May 21, 1884, in Accomack County, Virginia.

== Bibliography ==
- Pulliam, David Loyd (1901). The Constitutional Conventions of Virginia from the foundation of the Commonwealth to the present time. John T. West, Richmond. ISBN 978-1-2879-2059-5.
- Swem, Earl Greg (1918). A Register of the General Assembly of Virginia, 1776-1918, and of the Constitutional Conventions. David Bottom, Superintendent of Public Printing. ISBN 978-1-3714-6242-0.
