= John A. Meredith =

American politician

- Born: March 4, 1814; New Kent County, Virginia, U.S.
- Died: 1882 (aged 67–68); Richmond, Virginia, U.S.
- Occupation: Lawyer,
- Title: State Senator, Delegate, Judge

John A. Meredith (March 4, 1814 – March 15, 1882) was a nineteenth-century American politician and judge from Virginia.

== Early life ==
Meredith was born in New Kent County, Virginia, in 1814.

== Career ==
The Virginia Capitol at Richmond VA where 19th century Conventions met

Soon after his admission to the bar in Hanover County, Virginia, Meredith was appointed Commonwealth's Attorney there, holding that position until about 1850.

In 1850, Meredith was elected to the Virginia Constitutional Convention of 1850. He was one of six delegates elected from the central Piedmont delegate district made up of his home district of Richmond City, and including Henrico, New Kent and Charles City Counties.

Meredith was a member of the Virginia State Senate in 1851. While a state Senator, he was elected under the new Constitution of 1850 to judge of the Circuit Court of Richmond, Virginia. He was reelected to the position again by popular vote in 1860.

Though Meredith served as a judge during the Confederate regime of 1861-1865, he was appointed to the same Richmond Circuit Court by Unionist Governor Pierpont at the close of hostilities, and was then appointed by the General Assembly to continue in his office.

During Reconstruction, Meredith was appointed as head of U.S. General Halleck's "Court of Conciliation". He held his Circuit Court judgeship until the Radical Republican Congress removed all sitting judges in Virginia in 1869 immediately prior to the new Constitution of 1870 and the end of military occupation.

Meredith returned to private law practice until his appointment as Richmond City Attorney, and he was later elected to Richmond's Board of Aldermen where he presided.

== Death ==
Judge John A. Meredith died on March 15, 1882, in Richmond City, Virginia.

== Bibliography ==
- Virginia General Appeals Court (1882). Virginia Law Journal, volume 6. JJ. W. Randolph & English.
- Pulliam, David Loyd (1901). The Constitutional Conventions of Virginia from the foundation of the Commonwealth to the present time. John T. West, Richmond. ISBN 978-1-2879-2059-5.
