= Edward R. Chambers =

American politician from Virginia (1795–1872)

- Born: January 23, 1795; Lunenburg County, Virginia, U.S.
- Died: 1872 (aged 76–77); Mecklenburg County, Virginia, U.S.
- Education: University of North Carolina at Chapel Hill
- Occupation: Lawyer
- Title: Delegate

Edward R. Chambers (January 23, 1795 – March 20, 1872) was a nineteenth-century American politician from Virginia.

== Early life ==
Chambers was born in Lunenburg County, Virginia in 1795, and was educated at the University of North Carolina at Chapel Hill.

== Career ==
The Virginia Capitol at Richmond VA where 19th century Conventions met

As an adult, Chambers studied law and was admitted to the bar in 1817. He established a law practice in Boydton, the county seat of Mecklenburg County, Virginia in 1829.

Chambers served as the Commonwealth’s Attorney in Mecklenburg County, from 1835 to 1852.

In 1850, Chambers was elected to the Virginia Constitutional Convention of 1850. He was one of six delegates elected from the Southside delegate district made up of his home district of Mecklenburg County, as well as Pittsylvania and Halifax Counties.

In 1861, Chambers was a member of the Virginia Secession Convention after the vote on secession, and he signed the Ordinance of Secession as the Convention governed the state in emergency secret session in the place of the General Assembly.

== Death ==
Edward R. Chambers died in Mechlenburg County on March 20, 1872.

== Bibliography ==
- Pulliam, David Loyd (1901). The Constitutional Conventions of Virginia from the foundation of the Commonwealth to the present time. John T. West, Richmond. ISBN 978-1-2879-2059-5.
