= Peter Wallenstein =

Dr. Peter Wallenstein
- Born: United States
- Occupations: Author, Professor of history
- Writing career
- Period: 1986- present
- Genre: non-fiction history
- Website: liberalarts.vt.edu/departments-and-schools/department-of-history/faculty/peter-wallenstein.html

Peter R. Wallenstein is an author and professor of history at Virginia Tech.

== Education and career ==
Wallenstein received a bachelor's degree in history from Columbia University in 1966 and a doctorate in history from Johns Hopkins University in 1973.

Wallenstein specializes in history of the U.S. South, Virginia, civil rights, and higher education. He is currently researching in the areas of segregation, desegregation, and the University of North Carolina.

== Bibliography ==
- "From Slave South to New South: Public Policy in Nineteenth-Century Georgia (Fred W Morrison Series in Southern Studies)" May 1987 ISBN 978-0-8078-1717-9
- "Virginia Tech, Land-Grant University, 1872-1997: History of a School, a State, a Nation" Oct 1997 ISBN 978-0-936015-74-3
- "The Encyclopedia of American Political History" March 2001, ISBN 978-1-56802-511-7
- "Tell the Court I Love My Wife: Race, Marriage, and Law--An American History" January 2004 ISBN 978-1-4039-6408-3
- "Blue Laws and Black Codes: Conflict, Courts, and Change in Twentieth-Century Virginia" April 2004 ISBN 978-0-8139-2260-7
- "Virginia's Civil War" January 2005 ISBN 978-0-8139-2315-4
- "Cradle of America: Four Centuries of Virginia History" March 2007 ISBN 978-0-7006-1507-0
- "Higher Education and the Civil Rights Movement: White Supremacy, Black Southerners, and College Campuses." Gainesville: University of Florida Press, 2008. ISBN 978-0-8130-3162-0
