= Bedinger =

Bedinger is a surname. Notable people with the surname include:

- George M. Bedinger (1756–1843), American politician, uncle of Henry
- Henry Bedinger (1812–1858), American politician, lawyer, and diplomat

== See also ==
- Morgan-Bedinger-Dandridge House
