= James Paul =

James Paul may refer to:

- James Paul (conductor) (born 1940), American conductor
- James Paul (footballer) (fl. 1930s), Scottish footballer
- James A. Paul (born 1941), American writer and non-profit executive
- James Balfour Paul (1846–1931), Scottish nobleman
- James Patten Paul (1817–1891), Mormon pioneer
- James Paul (cricketer) (1888–1937), Argentine cricketer
- James Allen Paul (1947–2000), American spree killer

== See also ==
- James Paull (disambiguation)
