= James Paull =

James Paull may refer to:

- James Paull (West Virginia politician) (1901–1983), member of the West Virginia Senate
- James Paull (judge) (1818–1875), West Virginia judge and Virginia politician
- James Paull (MP) (1770–1808), British politician and duellist
- James Paull (moderator) (1782–1858), minister of the Church of Scotland
- James Paull (musician) (1957–2008), Australian guitarist in the band TISM

== See also ==
- James Paul (disambiguation)
