= Cold Spring (Shepherdstown, West Virginia) =

Historic house in West Virginia, United States

- U.S. National Register of Historic Places
- Location within West Virginia Location within the United States
- Nearest city: Shepherdstown, West Virginia
- Coordinates: 39°23′41.3″N 77°49′16.2″W
- Built: 1793
- NRHP reference No.: 73001917
- Added to NRHP: August 14, 1973

Cold Spring is a house near Shepherdstown, West Virginia, childhood home to two United States Representatives. The house was built by Edward Lucas III and his son, Robert in 1793.

Several of Robert and Sarah Rion Lucas' children were notable. Edward Lucas V served as a lieutenant in the War of 1812, then was elected to the Virginia House of Delegates in 1819, 130 and 1831. From 1833 to 1837 he was a US Congressman. Following his political career he was the superintendent of the Harpers Ferry Armory.

William Lucas became a lawyer. In 1838 he was elected to the Virginia House of Delegates, and in 1839 he was elected to Congress. In 1836 he built Rion Hall near Halltown, West Virginia.

A third brother, Robert, inherited Cold Spring, leaving it to his nephew, Daniel Bedinger Lucas in 1880.

== Description ==
The two-story house is built over a raised basement in coursed rough stone masonry. The double-pile center-hall plan is five bays wide. The upstairs hall is wider at the stairs than at the front or downstairs, allowing the hall to take up less of the plan that it would if the hall was as wide as the stairs. The basement kitchen has its own entrance. A stone porch and stairs were added in the nineteenth century.
