= Zion Episcopal Church (Charles Town, West Virginia) =

Historic Episcopal church in Charles Town, West Virginia

- Zion Episcopal Church, Saint Andrews Parish
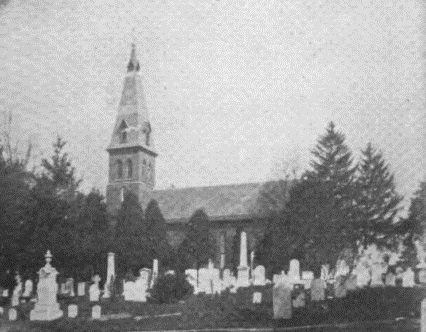
- Photograph taken c. 1900

- Location within Eastern Panhandle of West Virginia Location within West Virginia Location within the United States
- 39°17′20.1″N 77°51′20.6″W
- Location: 301 East Congress Street; Charles Town, West Virginia
- Country: United States
- Denomination: Episcopal Church
- Website: www.zionepiscopal.net

History
- Consecrated: December 6, 1851; 174 years ago

Architecture
- Architectural type: Gothic Revival
- Years built: 1815 (first church); 1847–8 (second church); 1851 (present church)

Clergy
- Rector: Johanna Marcure
- Zion Episcopal Church
- U.S. Historic district – Contributing property
- Part of: Downtown Charles Town Historic District (ID97000263)
- Added to NRHP: March 21, 1997; 29 years ago

Zion Episcopal Church is a historic Episcopal church in Charles Town, in the U.S. state of West Virginia.

== Geography and setting ==
Zion Episcopal Church is located on the highest point in Charles Town, on East Congress Street, between Mildred and Church Streets. Due to its elevation, the church was named Zion, meaning "city on the hill, the heavenly Jerusalem."

== History ==
Episcopalian residents in the area of present-day Charles Town were originally served by St. Georges Chapel, which was built in the 1770s and fell into disrepair following the American Revolutionary War. In 1815, the first church building on the site of Zion Episcopal Church was established and built as a successor to St. Georges Chapel. This church was replaced by a larger structure built between 1847 and 1848; however, this church was destroyed by fire shortly after its completion. In 1851, the present church was built and consecrated on December 6 of that year.

During the American Civil War, the church was used by Union forces as a hospital for Union troops, during which time the building sustained significant damage.

On March 21, 1997, the Downtown Charles Town Historic District was listed on the National Register of Historic Places, which includes Zion Episcopal Church as a contributing property.

== Architecture ==
The Zion Episcopal Church is a brick building built in the Gothic Revival architectural style. The church features a square bell tower, decorative corbeling, and multi-paned windows with pointed arched heads.

== Churchyard ==
The churchyard contains over 1,500 gravesites, including the interments of 70 members of the Washington family, more than any other site in the United States outside Mount Vernon. The following notable individuals are interred in the churchyard:

- John Yates Beall, Confederate privateer in the American Civil War
- R. Preston Chew, Businessperson and politician
- William Price Craighill, Union Army officer
- William Loyall Gravatt, American Episcopal bishop
- Thomas C. Green, Supreme Court of Appeals of West Virginia justice
- Andrew Hunter, American lawyer and politician
- Andrea King, American actress
- Daniel B. Lucas, Supreme Court of Appeals of West Virginia justice
- William Lucas, American politician
- Beverley D. Tucker, American Episcopal bishop
- Bushrod C. Washington, American politician
- Lewis Washington, John Brown's raid on Harpers Ferry hostage

== See also ==
- National Register of Historic Places listings in Jefferson County, West Virginia
