= 1815 Virginia's 15th congressional district special election =

On May 27, 1815, Representative Matthew Clay (DR) of Virginia's 15th district died in office before the start of the 1st session of the 14th Congress. A special election was held in October of that year to fill the resulting vacancy.

== Election results ==
Candidate	Party	Votes	Percent
John Kerr	Democratic-Republican	560	44.0%
William Rice	Federalist	339	26.6%
Thomas Wooding	Democratic-Republican	250	19.6%
Isaac Medley	Democratic-Republican	94	7.4%
White	Federalist	31	2.4%

Kerr had been defeated for re-election in the regular 1815 elections and took his seat December 5, 1815, at the start of the 1st session.

== See also ==
- List of special elections to the United States House of Representatives
