= Émile Mauchamp =

French doctor assassinated in Marrakesh (1870–1907)

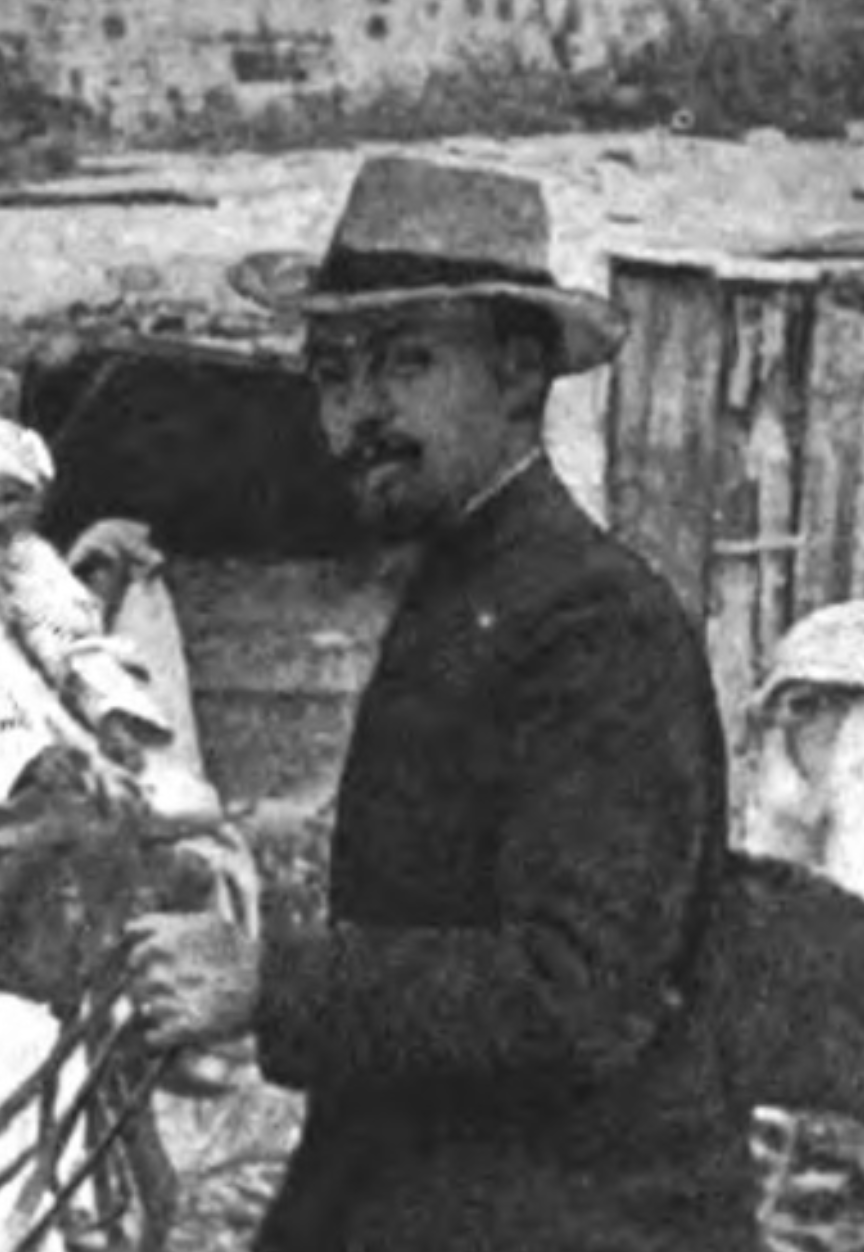
- Born: Pierre Benoit Émile Mauchamp; 3 March 1870; Chalon-sur-Saône, Saône-et-Loire, France
- Died: 19 March 1907 (aged 37); Marrakesh, Morocco

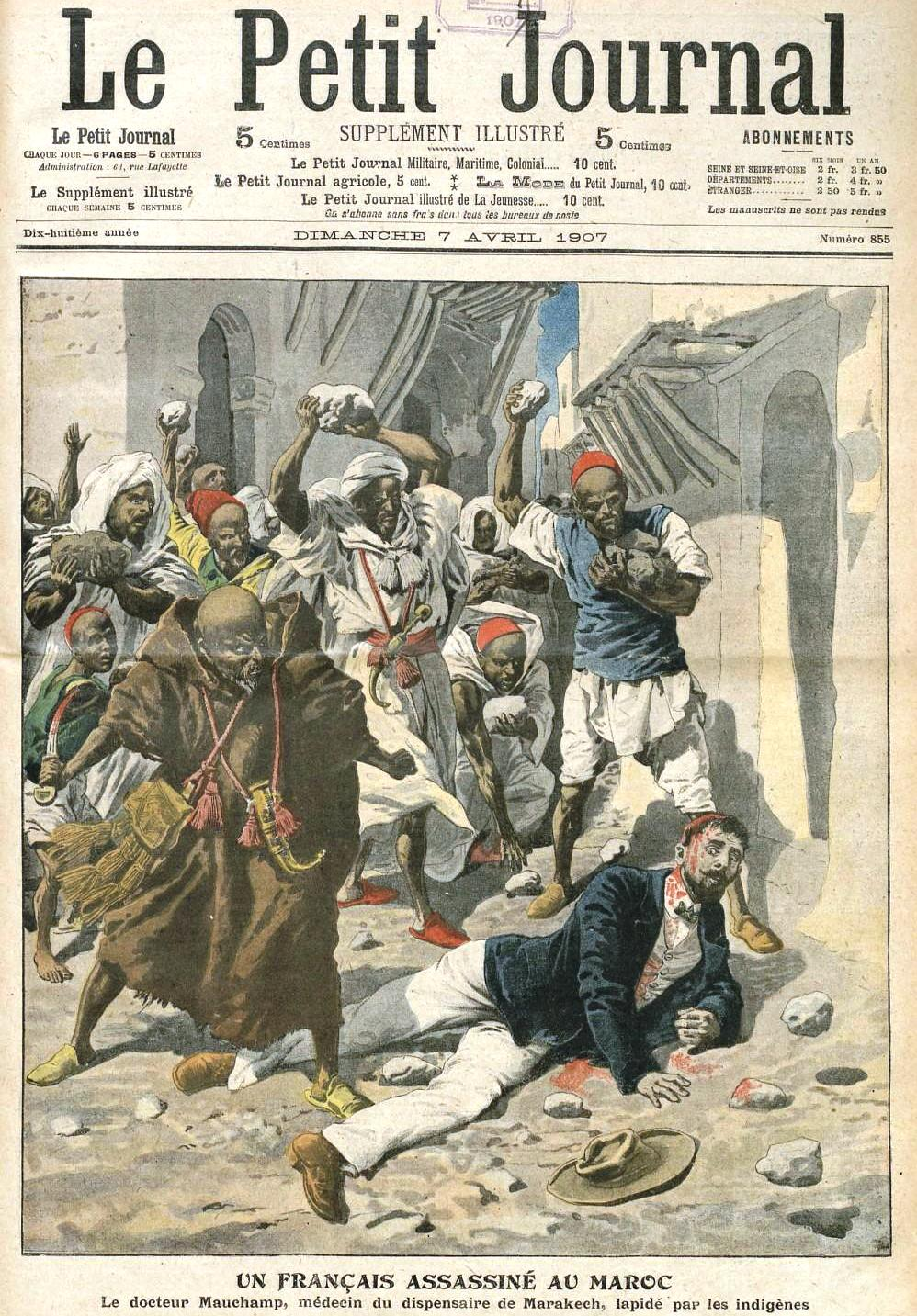
Caption reads: A Frenchman assassinated in Morocco: Doctor Mauchamp, doctor of the Marrakesh dispensary, stoned to death by the natives.

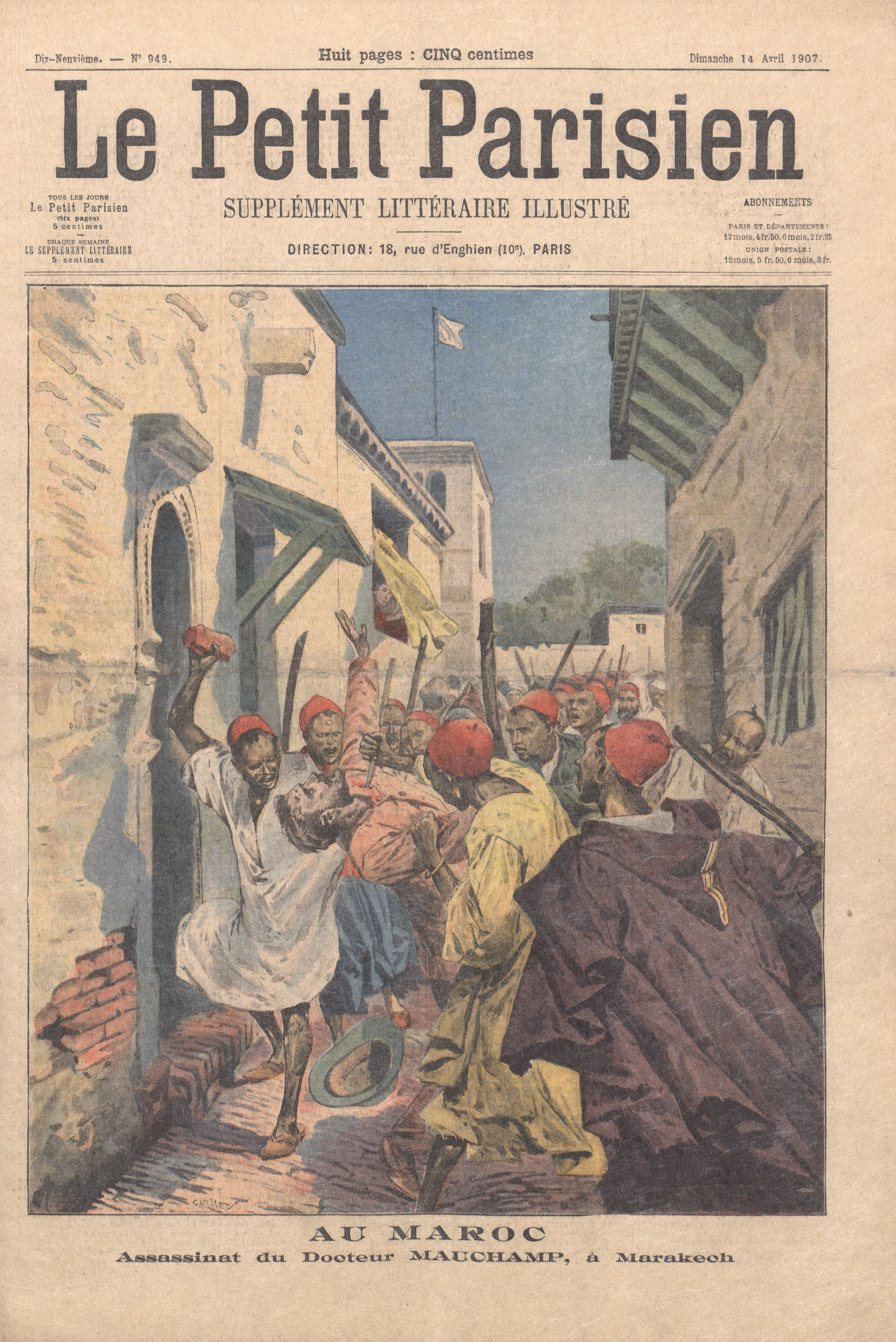
Caption reads: In Morocco: the Assassination of Doctor Mauchamp in Marrakesh

The assassination of Dr. Mauchamp as depicted in conservative French newspapers Le Petit Journal (left) and Le Petit Parisien (right) in 1907.

Émile Mauchamp or Pierre Benoit Émile Mauchamp (3 March 1870 – 19 March 1907) was a French physician and informant assassinated by a mob in Marrakesh, near the pharmacy where he practiced. He was characterized as a "martyr to civilization" in the French press; his death, an "unprovoked and indefensible attack from the barbarous natives of Morocco." His death was taken as a pretext by Hubert Lyautey and his forces in taking Oujda, marking the beginning of the French conquest of Morocco.

== Biography ==
Émile Mauchamp was the son of a politician who was the counselor general of Chalon-sur-Saône. After his studies in collège, he left for Paris to study medicine. He was named a marine medical officer and practiced in a number of countries: Portugal, Brazil, Italy, Greece, Russia, and Turkey.

=== Morocco ===
After a journey to Jerusalem, he was chosen by decree of the minister of foreign affairs to go to Morocco and run a pharmacy created in Marrakesh in 1905.

He arrived in Marrakesh October 1905. He took residence in the former home of Fernand Linarès, a French doctor who stayed in Morocco from 1877 to 1902. Mauchamp ingratiated himself to Marrakshi notables including members of the Glaoui family as well as Abd al-Hafid Ibn Hassan al-Alawi, pasha of Marrakesh and brother of Sultan Abdelaziz, whom Abd al-Hafid would later challenge and depose in the Hafidiya. As a French doctor, Mauchamp observed the political events involved in Abd al-Hafid's ascent and maintained French connections to him in spite of the significant German support and influence.

A typhus epidemic broke out in the summer of 1906, as political developments were intensifying in the aftermath of the Algeciras Conference (16 January – 7 April 1906). Mauchamp wrote to his French superiors that he was forced to do "lots of medicine and little politics."

=== Assassination ===
Mauchamp was beaten to death just outside his medical clinic in Marrakesh on March 19, 1907. The event was the culmination of anti-European sentiment that was a reaction to the inaction of the Moroccan sultan to counter European influence.

According to Jim Paul, "the circumstances of the case were very clearly political. Though specific accounts of the murder vary, there is general agreement that the cause was Mauchamp's known espionage activities."

==== Funeral ====
Émile Mauchamp was given a national funeral and was awarded the medal of the Legion of Honour posthumously.

His funeral on April 11, 1907, was attended by a massive crowd including several political figures such as the French Minister of Foreign Affairs Stephen Pichon. Mauchamp's casket arrived at the station of Chalon-sur-Saône at 9 am, draped in the French flag. His coffin was displayed on a catafalque placed in front of the town hall. No fewer than 7 speeches were made. The funeral procession then headed to the Cemetery of the East; shopkeepers lowered their curtains. He was interred in the intimacy of his family, but the citizens had an opportunity to pay their last respects.

The spectacle of Mauchamp's assassination in L'Illustration.

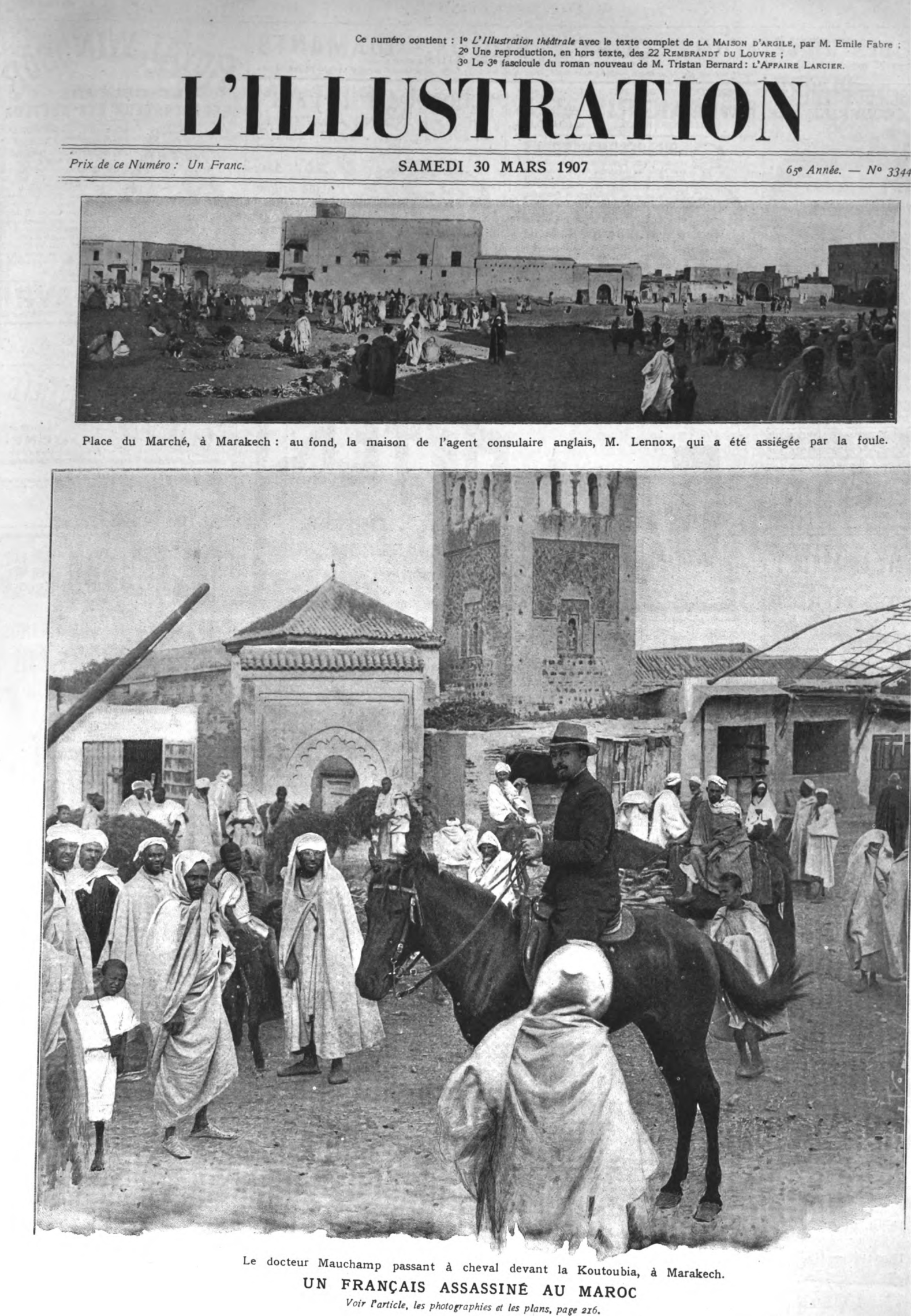

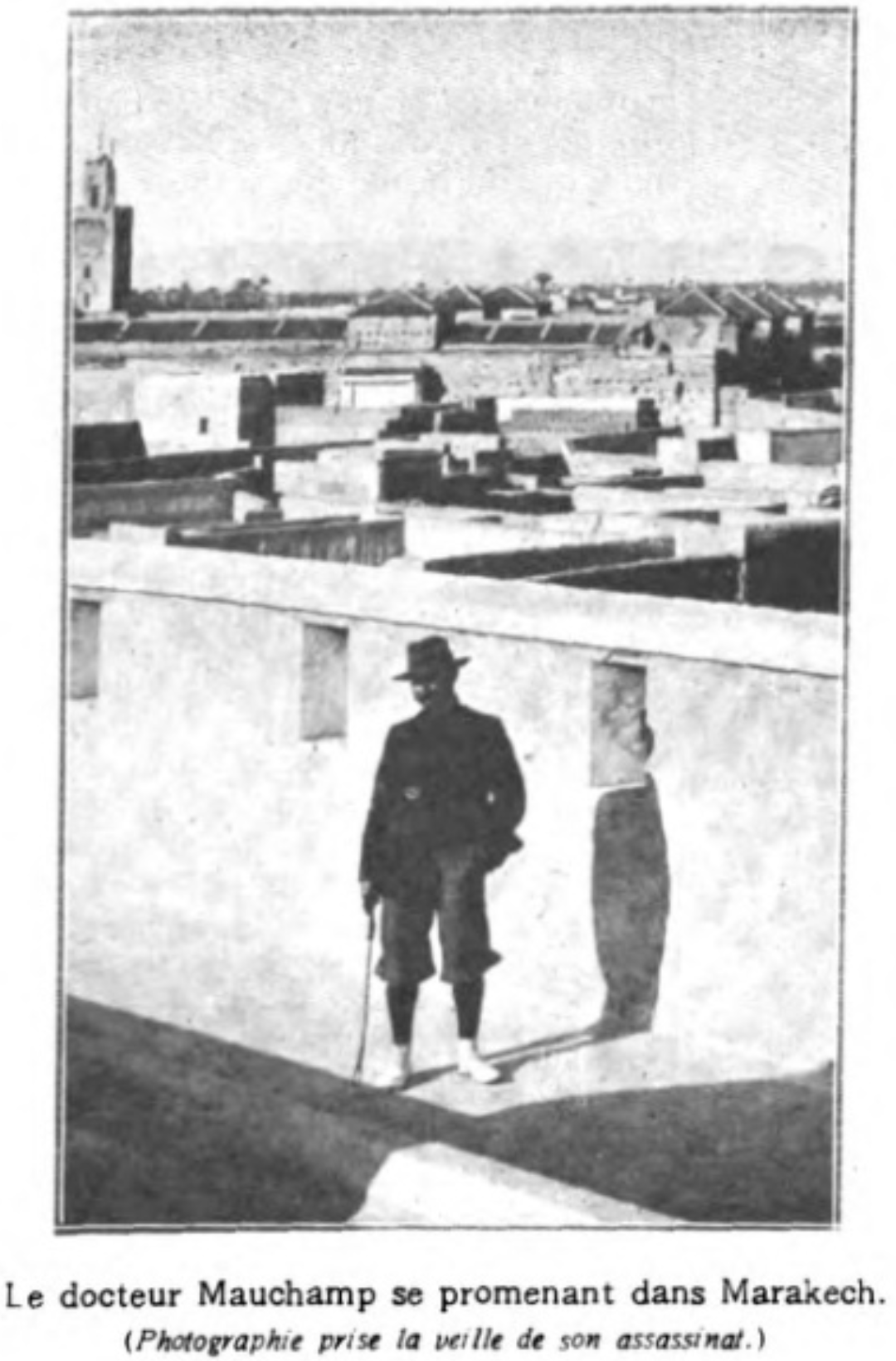

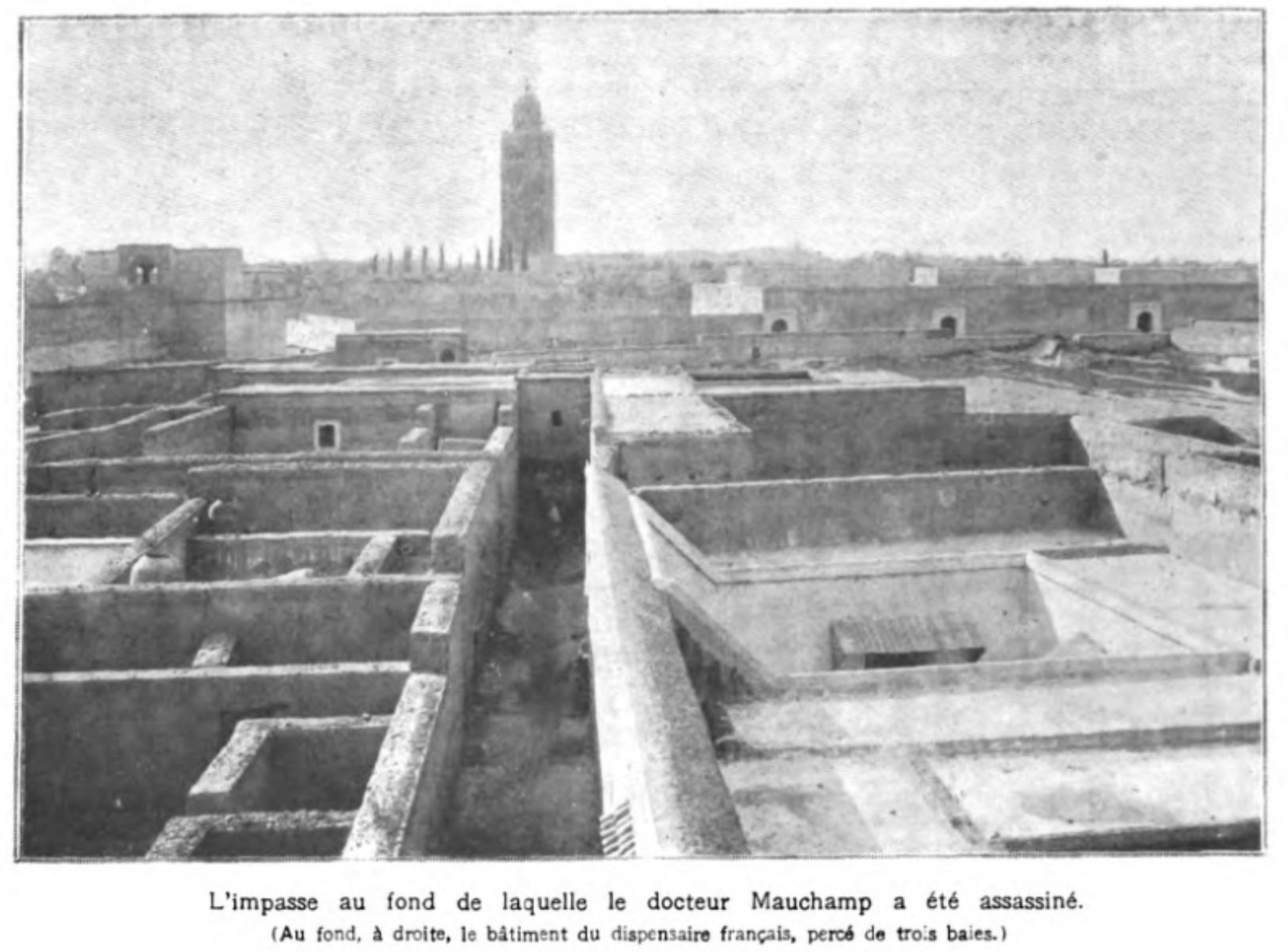

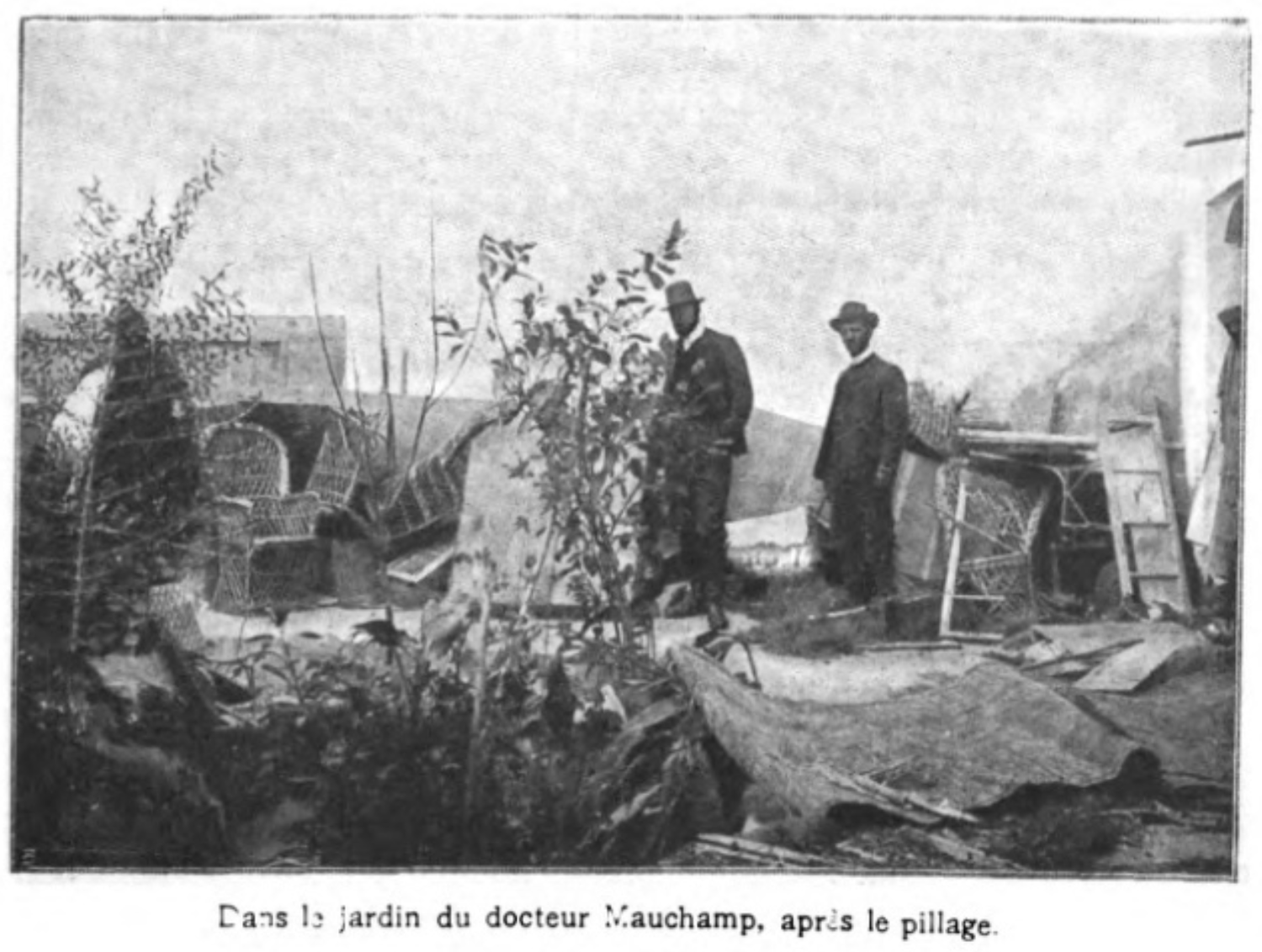

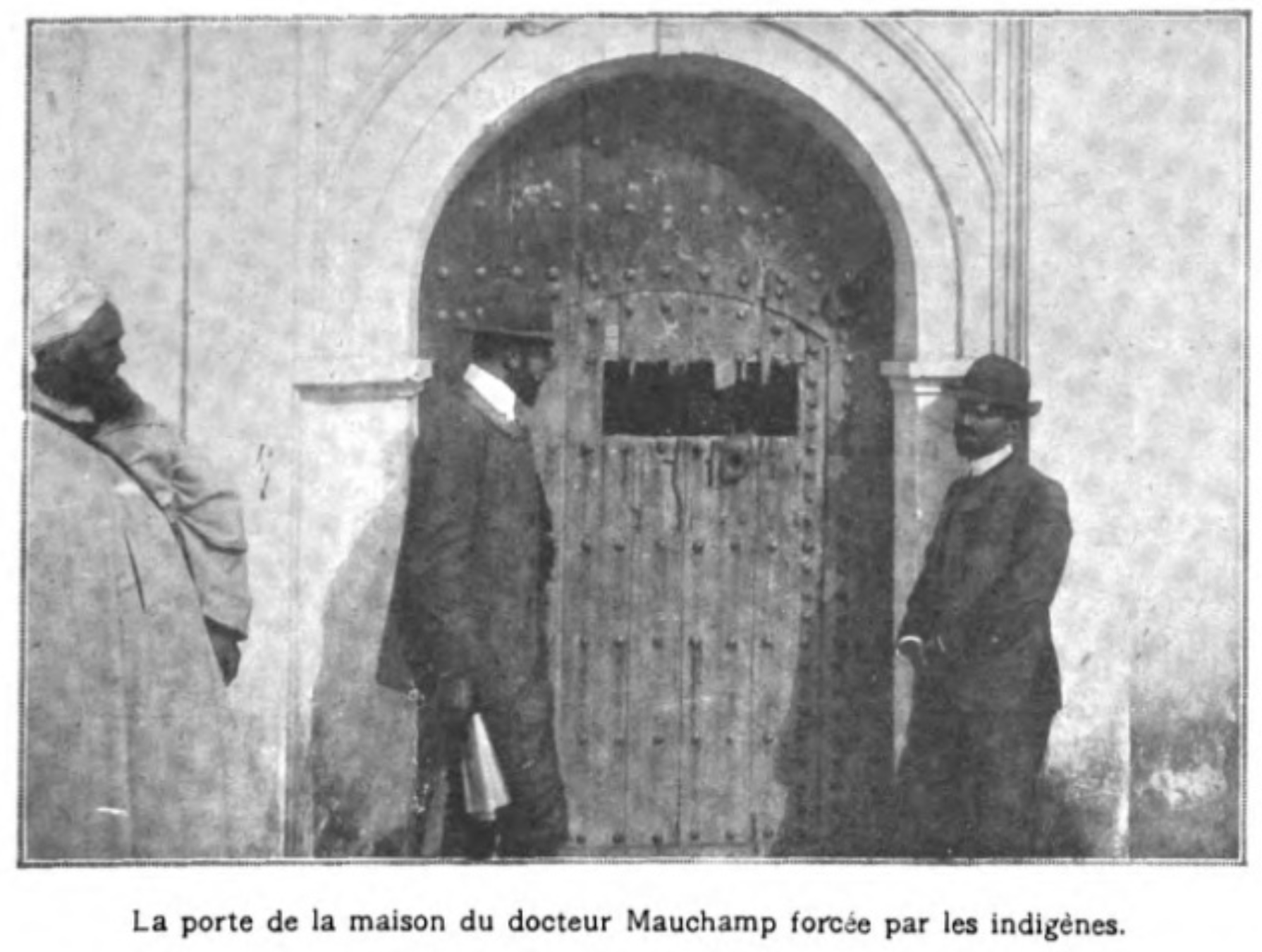

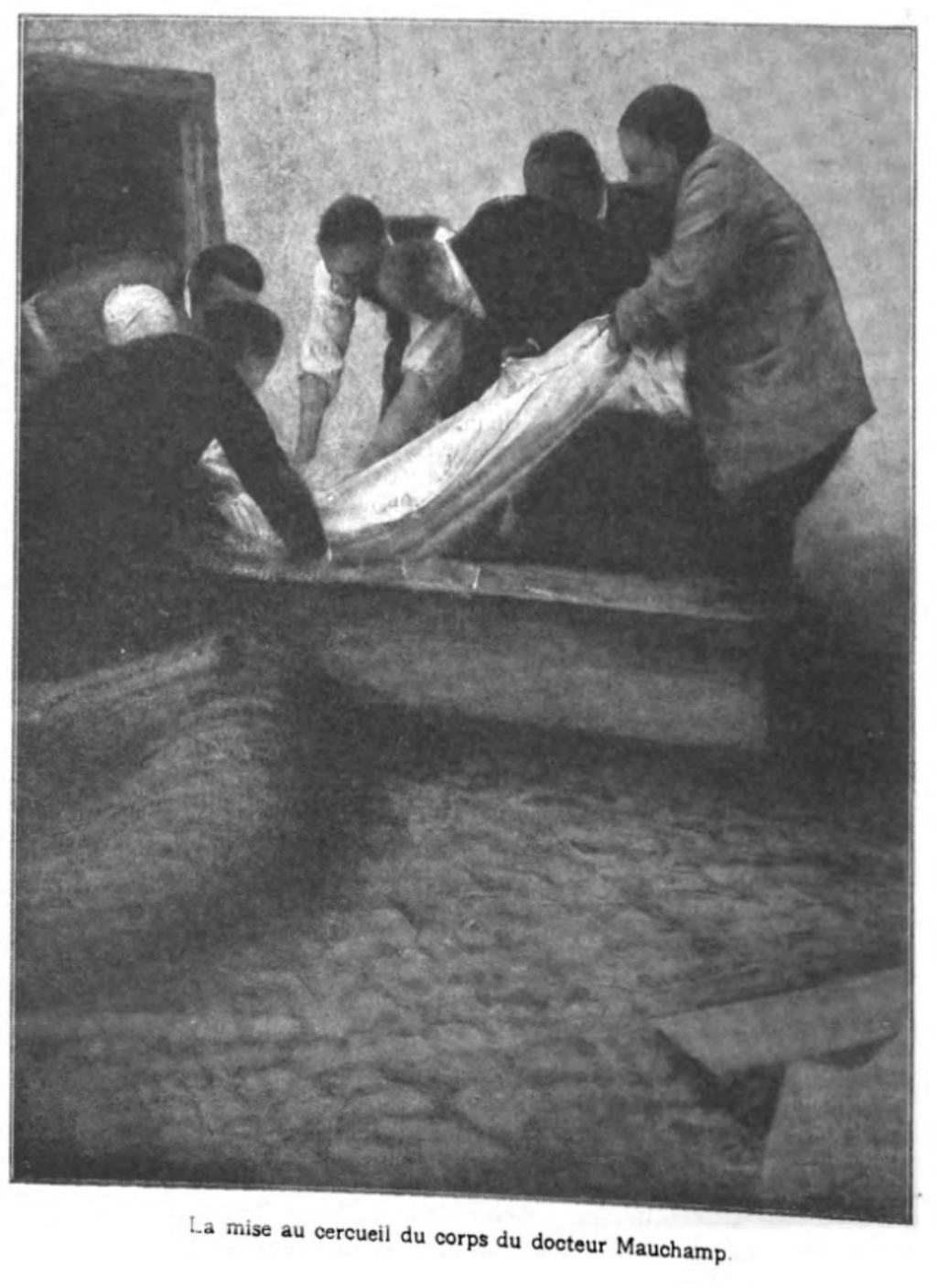

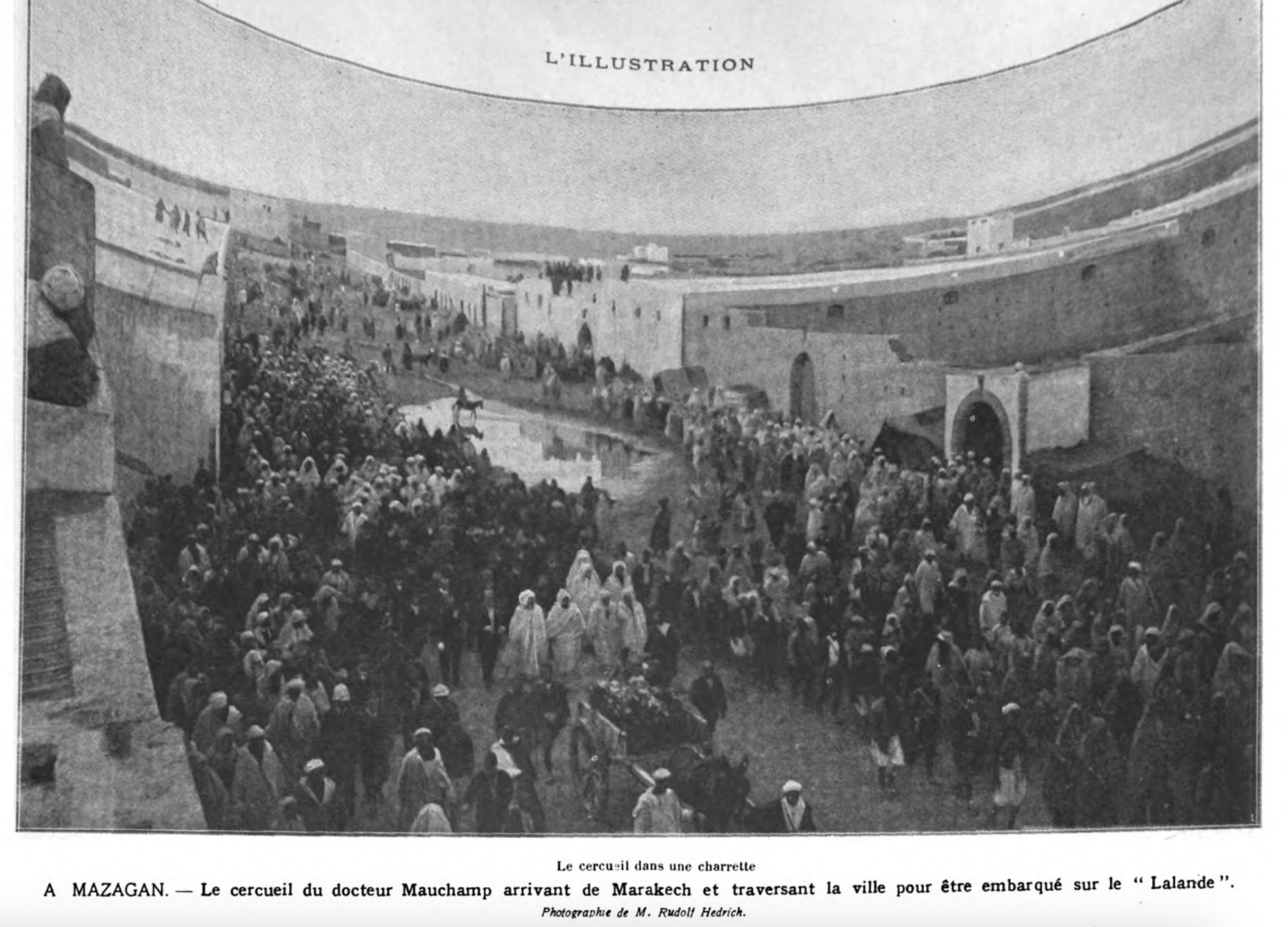

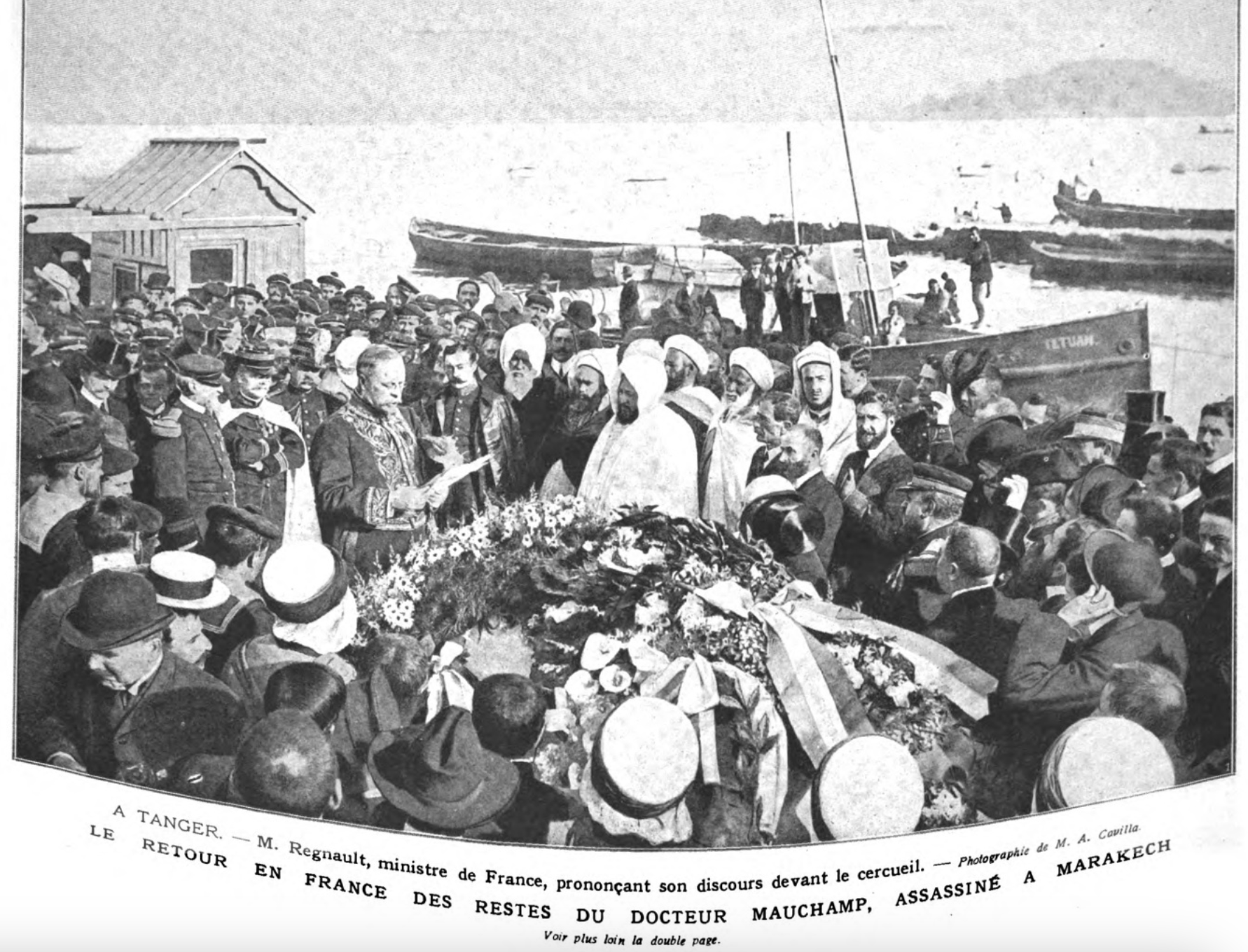

== Monuments ==
A bronze sculpture by Pierre Curillon placed in Chabas Square in the memory of Dr. Émile Mauchamp was inaugurated on August 21, 1910. The statue features a Moroccan woman extending an arm toward the doctor while holding her son in the other arm. German soldiers stole the statue in World War II. A street in Chalon-sur-Saône leading toward the courthouse still bears his name.

== Bibliography ==
- "Dr. Pierre Benoit Emile Mauchamp". British Medical Journal. 1 (2413): 785. 1907. doi:10.1136/bmj.1.2413.785-b. PMC 2357128..
- Katz, Jonathan Glustrom (2006). Murder in Marrakech: Émile Mauchamp and the French Colonial Adventure. Bloomington et Indianapolis: Indiana University Press. p. 358. ISBN 978-0-253-34815-9.
- Robert Tatheraux, Émile Mauchamp : la vie généreuse et la fin tragique d'un médecin chalonnais, revue « Images de Saône-et-Loire » n° 56 (Noël 1983), pp. 17–19.
- Amster, Ellen J. (August 15, 2013). Medicine and the Saints: Science, Islam, and the Colonial Encounter in Morocco, 1877-1956. University of Texas Press. ISBN 978-0292762114.
