= William G. Thomas III =

American historian (born 1964)

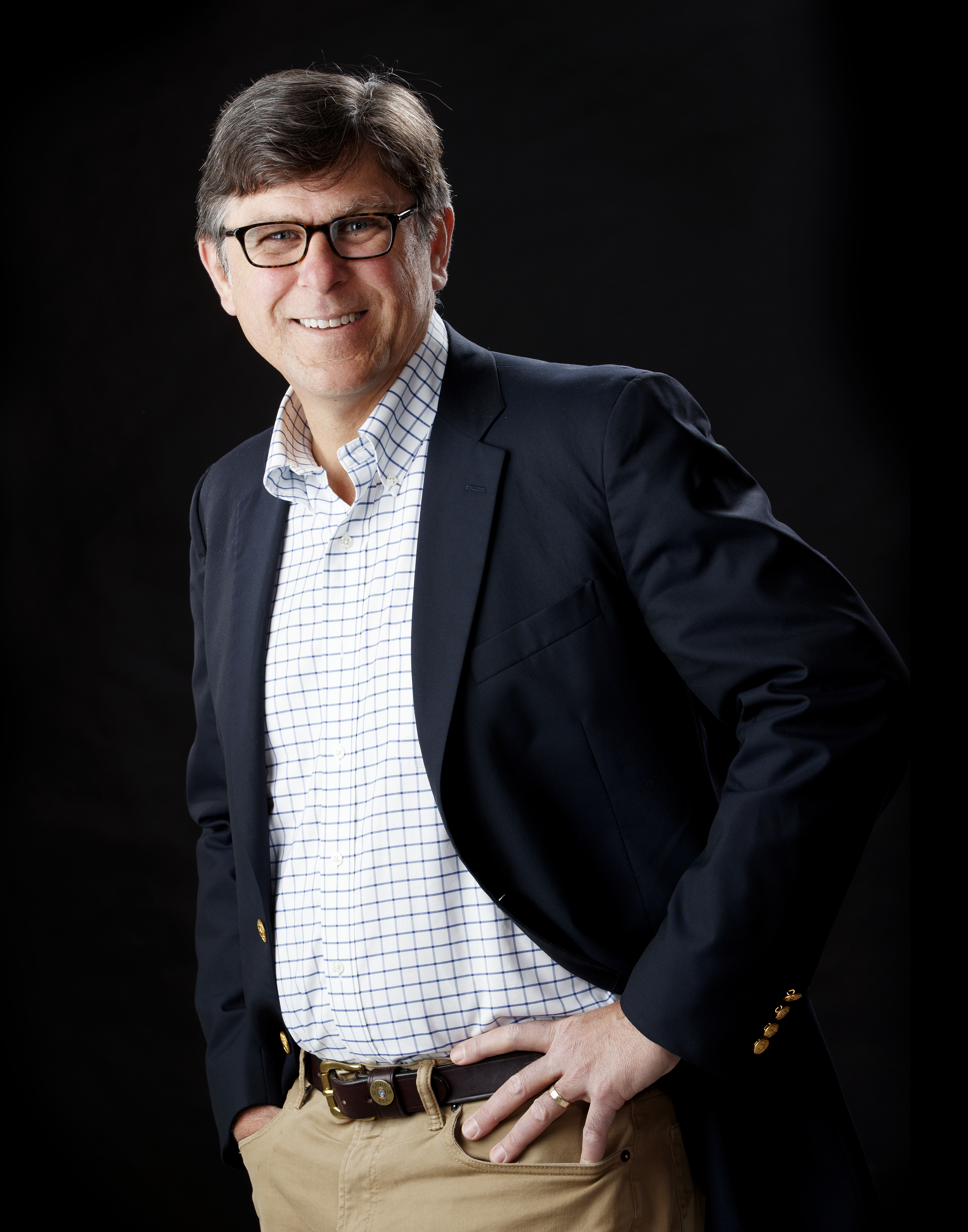
- Born: 1964 (age 61–62); Clarens Estate, Alexandria, Virginia, U.S.
- Education: Trinity College; University of Virginia
- Occupation: Historian
- Employer: University of Nebraska–Lincoln

William G. Thomas III (born 1964) is an American historian. He is a Professor of History and the John and Catherine Angle Professor in the Humanities at the University of Nebraska–Lincoln. His research focuses on the Southeastern United States, including slavery, the American Civil War and the New South. He won a Guggenheim Fellowship in 2016.

== Works ==
- Lawyering for the Railroad: Business, Law, and Power in the New South (1999)
- The Iron Way: Railroads, the Civil War, and the Making of Modern America (2011)
- A Question Of Freedom: The Families Who Challenged Slavery from the Nation’s Founding to the Civil War (2020)
