= Richard W. Barton =

American politician

Richard Walker Barton

Member of the U.S. House of Representatives from Virginia's 10th district
- In office March 4, 1841 – March 3, 1843
- Preceded by: William Lucas
- Succeeded by: Lewis Steenrod

Member of the Virginia House of Delegates from Frederick County
- In office January 7, 1839 – December 1, 1839 Serving with Joseph H. Sherrard
- Preceded by: William Wood
- Succeeded by: Robert L. Baker
- In office December 3, 1832 – December 6, 1835 Serving with John B. D. Smith, John B. Earle, James Gibson
- Preceded by: William Wood
- Succeeded by: James Bowen
- In office December 1, 1823 – November 28, 1824 Serving with Joseph Sexton
- Preceded by: William Byrd Page
- Succeeded by: James Ship

Personal details
- Born: July 3, 1799 "Shady Oak," Winchester, Frederick County, Virginia, US
- Died: January 15, 1860 (aged 60) "Springdale", Frederick County, Virginia, US
- Party: Whig
- Spouse(s): Alcinda Winn Gibson (d. 1829); Caroline Marx
- Profession: Politician, lawyer, planter

Richard Walker Barton (July 3, 1799 – January 15, 1860) was a nineteenth-century politician, lawyer and planter from Virginia. His nephew Robert Thomas Barton (1842-1917), who unlike three of his brothers survived fighting in the Confederate States Army, also became a distinguished lawyer in the Winchester, Virginia area, as well as a member of the Virginia House of Delegates and author. Career U.S. Army officer turned controversial Confederate engineer Seth Maxwell Barton of Fredericksburg was a more distant relative.

== Early and family life ==
Born at "Shady Oak" farm about six miles from Winchester, Virginia, to the former Martha Walker and her husband Richard Peters Barton. His grandfather was Rev. Thomas Barton. When Richard was a young boy, his father bought 288 acres of land on Opequon Creek that included a stone house which local pioneer John Hite had built in 1753. The Bartons renamed the property "Springdale" and this man lived there as an adult, and ultimately left it to one of his surviving brothers in his will. The area comprising both farms was later known as "Bartonsville." R.W. Barton had four brothers and three sisters. He received a private education appropriate to his class, then studied law.

Barton married twice. His first wife, the former Alcinda Gibson of nearby Culpeper County, bore two sons and a daughter before her death in 1829. Barton remarried, to Caroline Marx, who bore two sons and two daughters.

== Career ==
Admitted to the Virginia bar, Barton began his law practice in Winchester, the Frederick county seat. He also farmed using enslaved labor, and Winchester was also the site of the chancery court for northwestern Virginia, which handled cases involving decedents' estates and matters involving women and slaves who had no status in the civil court system. In 1830 Barton owned 24 slaves, including 9 boys and a girl under 10 years of age, and one enslaved man older than 55. By 1840, he owned 30 slaves and by 1859 his real estate was worth more than $100,000. However, the slave schedules first instituted in the 1850 census show him as owning 28 slaves, ranging from a 100 year old man to 11 children 10 and under. Barton enlarged Springdale to about 610 acres, and also speculated in land in Frederick county and westward in Randolph County that became part of the new state of West Virginia not long after his death. He helped found the Valley Agricultural Society of Frederick County, which began holding an annual cattle show in 1856.

Frederick County voters first elected Barton to represent them, part time, in the Virginia General Assembly in April 1823, and he was not immediately re-elected after his first term. Following the adoption of the new Virginia Constitution, Frederick County was allowed to select three delegates to that body, and Barton not only won election in 1832, but won re-election the following year with the most votes of all the candidates, and was the second-highest vote-getter in 1834. He won election to the House of Delegates for the last time in 1838. serving for most of 1839.

Barton ran for a seat in the U.S. House of Representatives as the candidate of the new Whig party in 1839, but lost to Democrat William Lucas. Two years later, in 1840, he defeated Lucas and served as Congressman from Virginia's 15th congressional district from 1841 to 1843. He did not seek reelection following the redistricting in 1842, which pushed the 15th district further westward, and put Frederick County in Virginia's 10th congressional district, which re-elected William Lucas. Barton resumed his legal practice in Winchester and other investments.

== Death and legacy ==
The day following his execution of a last will and testament, Barton died on his estate called "Springdale" near Winchester on March 15, 1859. He was interred in the family cemetery on the estate.

U.S. House of Representatives
| Preceded by William Lucas | Member of the U.S. House of Representatives from Virginia's 15th congressional district March 4, 1841 – March 3, 1843 (obsolete district) | Succeeded by Lewis Steenrod |
