= Woodridge (Wheeling, West Virginia) =

Historic house in West Virginia, United States

- U.S. National Register of Historic Places
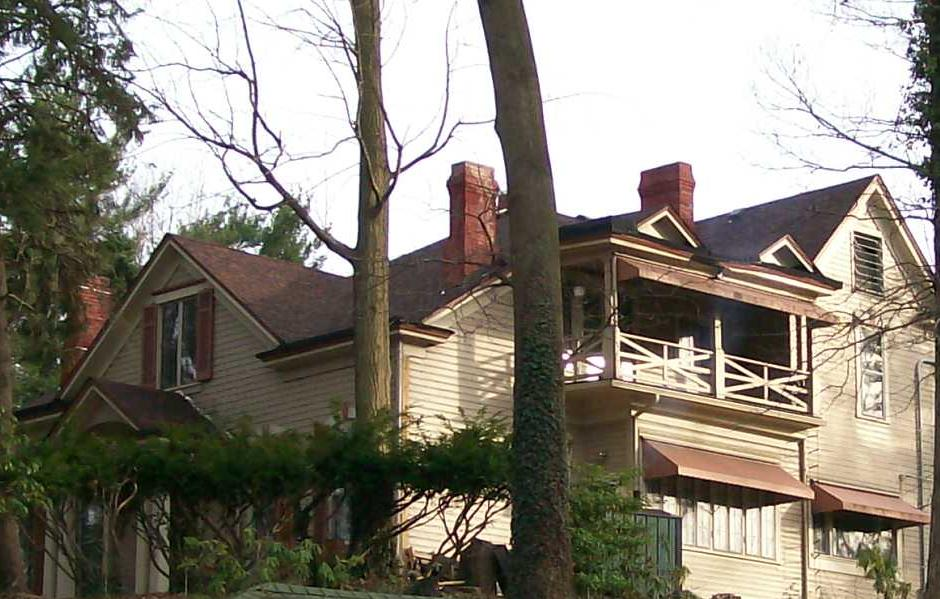
- Woodridge, April 2010

- Location within West Virginia Location within the United States
- Location: 1308 Steenrod Ave., Wheeling, West Virginia
- Coordinates: 40°4′8″N 80°41′12″W
- Area: 1.1 acres (0.45 ha)
- Built: 1831
- Architectural style: Eclectic
- NRHP reference No.: 05000658
- Added to NRHP: July 6, 2005

Woodridge is a historic home located at Wheeling, Ohio County, West Virginia. It is a 1 1/2- to 2 1/2-story frame house clad in clapboard siding and sits on a foundation of stone and concrete. The original section was built in 1831, with additions made about 1880. It features a centered portico supported by four square columns. Also on the property is a contributing stone wall and pillars. United States Congressman Lewis Steenrod resided at the house from about 1845 to 1862.

It was listed on the National Register of Historic Places in 2005.
