= Global Policy Forum =

International non-governmental organization

The Global Policy Forum (GPF) is an international organization that analyze developments in the United Nations and focus the topic of global governance. It was founded in December 1993 and based in New York and Bonn (Global Policy Forum Europe). It attempts to build a bridge between the international and the local level. GPF seeks to strengthen intergovernmental organizations and promote multilateralism based on solidarity, international law, and the United Nations Charter. GPF has consultative status on the United Nations Economic and Social Council (ECOSOC). Jens Martens has been the GPF's executive director since 2014 and director of GPF Europe since its founding in 2004.

The Global Policy Forum takes a holistic approach to its work, linking peace and security with economic and social justice, human development, and sustainable policies. Its goal is to uncover entrenched power structures within the multilateral world order and the United Nations, seeking inclusive, cooperative, peaceful, and sustainable solutions to global challenges. To that effect, the organization calls for increased accountability and citizen participation.

== History ==
The Global Policy Forum was founded in New York in 1993 by 14 progressive scholars and activists, including James A. Paul, Erskine Barton Childers, and Joel Krieger. On September 24, 2004, a European branch was established in Bonn, Germany, in order to work more closely on German and European policy in the context of the United Nations. In spring 2005, the Bonn office was opened under the name Global Policy Forum Europe. The two organizations are legally separate, but work closely together.

== Work programs ==
The work programs focus on sustainable development and human rights, development finance and tax justice, UN reform and multilateralism, and corporate influence and accountability. The GPF thus takes a holistic approach, combining social, economic, financial, and environmental issues, peace and security, as well as human rights and gender justice.

== Publications and Events ==
GPF publishes comprehensive issue-specific reports, policy papers, shorter technical texts, and position statements. Many are produced in cooperation with national and international organizations. For example, since 2016, the Global Policy Forum has published the annual Spotlight Report on Sustainable Development in cooperation with international non-governmental organizations, which analyzes the latest developments and trends in the implementation of the 2030 Agenda.

In addition, the GPF organizes expert discussions, civil society conferences and other meetings, and participates in policy dialogues.

== Funding ==
The Global Policy Forum Europe is a non-profit registered association. GPF is mostly financed by grants from partner organizations, public institutions and foundations, as well as by membership fees and individual donations.

=== Organization ===
The business of GPF is conducted by a board and secretariat in New York, while the business of GPF Europe engages a separate board and secretariat in Bonn. These teams are supported by a network of volunteer members (from GPF Europe) and consultants based in around the world.

== Network ==
GPF and GPF Europe play an active role in international civil society networks and alliances. These include Social Watch, the Women's Major Group, the Reflection Group on the 2030 Agenda for Sustainable Development, the Global Alliance for Tax Justice, the Civil Society Financing for Development Group, the Treaty Alliance, the CorA Network for Corporate Responsibility, and the Geneva Global Health Hub (G2H2), among others.

Activities are also implemented in close collaboration with civil society organizations and networks. Partners include the Arab NGO Network for Development (ANND), the Center for Economic and Social Rights (CESR), Development Alternatives with Women for a New Era (DAWN), Public Services International (PSI), Society for International Development (SID), Third World Network (TWN), the Friedrich Ebert Foundation (FES), the Rosa Luxemburg Foundation (RLS), Misereor, Brot für die Welt, Engagement Global, and the Foundation Environment and Development of North Rhine-Westphalia.
