= Rion Hall =

Historic house in West Virginia, United States

- U.S. National Register of Historic Places
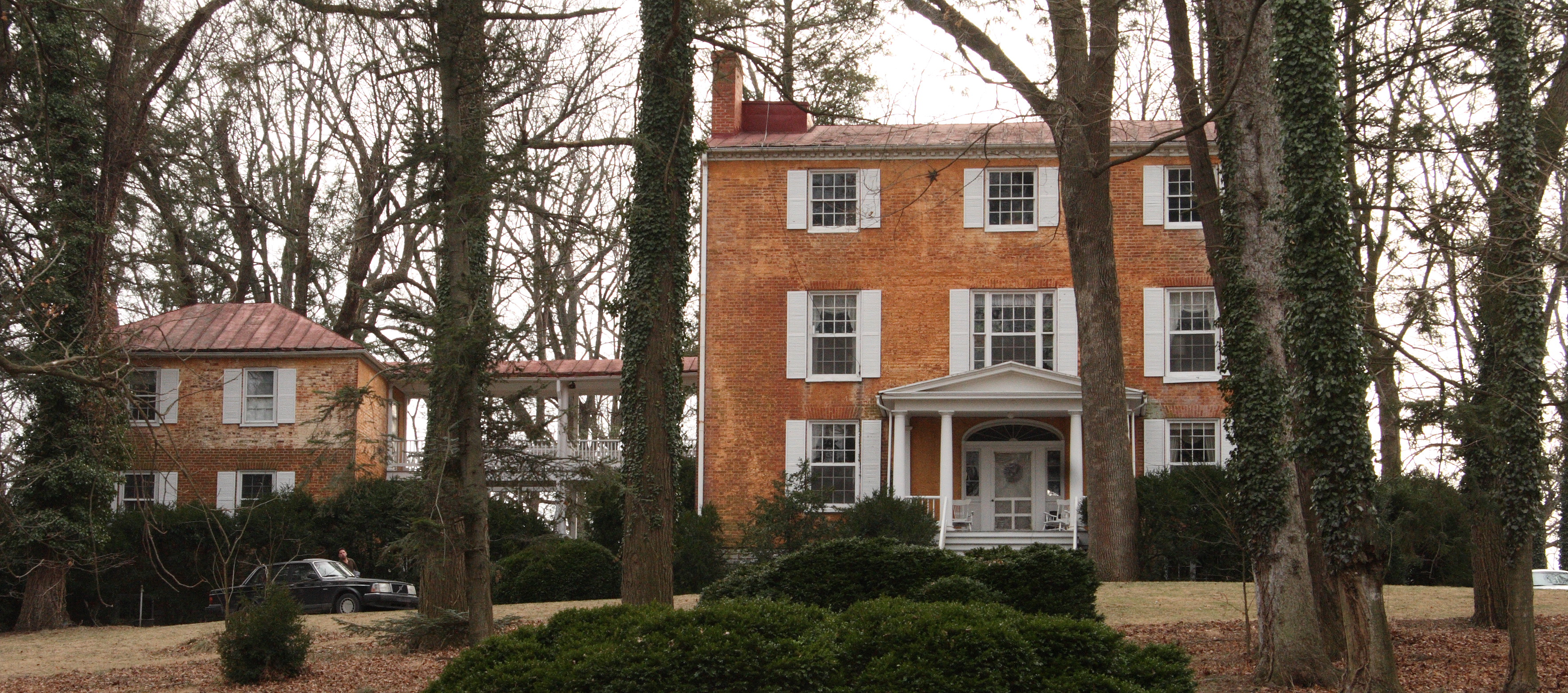

- Location within West Virginia Location within the United States
- Nearest city: Charles Town, West Virginia
- Coordinates: 39°18′05.31″N 77°48′19.28″W
- Built: 1836
- Architectural style: Greek Revival, Federal
- NRHP reference No.: 82004320
- Added to NRHP: September 20, 1982

Rion Hall is a late Federal style house near Halltown, West Virginia, United States. Built in 1836, it consists of a three-story brick house with a two-story kitchen wing connected by a wood hyphen. The house was used as a headquarters for General Philip H. Sheridan during the American Civil War.

The house was built in 1836 by William Lucas. Lucas was the son of Robert and Sarah Rion Lucas, and was born at Cold Spring. In 1838, Lucas was elected to the United States House of Representatives, serving a total of three terms. At William Lucas' death, the property passed to his son, Daniel Bedinger Lucas, a lawyer and a poet, who was briefly appointed to the US Senate by the Governor of West Virginia, but not seated. With Daniel Lucas' death the property passed to Virginia Lucas, whose accidental death in 1929 left the house vacant for ten years. In 1938 the house changed hands and underwent renovation.

== See also ==
- Halltown Union Colored Sunday School
