= William Lucas (Virginia politician) =

American politician

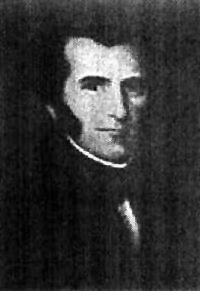

Member of the U.S. House of Representatives from Virginia's 10th district
- In office March 4, 1843 – March 4, 1845
- Preceded by: John Taliaferro
- Succeeded by: Henry Bedinger

Member of the U.S. House of Representatives from 's 15th district
- In office March 4, 1839 – March 4, 1841 (obsolete district)
- Preceded by: James M. Mason
- Succeeded by: Richard W. Barton

Member of the Virginia House of Delegates from Jefferson County
- In office January 10, 1838 – January 6, 1839 Serving with John Peter
- Preceded by: Thomas Griggs Jr.
- Succeeded by: Bushrod C. Washington

Personal details
- Born: November 30, 1800 "Cold Spring," Shepherdstown, Virginia (now West Virginia), US
- Died: August 29, 1877 (aged 76) Jefferson County, Virginia (now West Virginia), US
- Party: Democratic
- Spouse: Virginia Ann Bedinger
- Relatives: Edward Lucas (brother), Daniel B. Lucas (son); Robert Lucas (governor)(cousin)
- Profession: Politician, lawyer, planter

William Lucas (November 30, 1800 – August 29, 1877) was a nineteenth-century planter, politician and lawyer from Virginia.

== Early life ==
Born at Cold Spring near Shepherdstown, Virginia (now West Virginia) in 1800 to the former Sarah Rion and her husband, Robert Lucas. His family included an elder brother Edward Lucas, who served as an officer in the War of 1812 when William was a boy. Their Quaker grandfather, Edward Lucas II, moved his family to Virginia from Bucks County, Pennsylvania, and patented 400 acres near the Potomac River that much later would be part of Elmwood Farm (established by his son Edward Lucas III in 1797). Edward Lucas II had built Cold Spring for his son Robert in 1793, and his brother (another William Lucas, this man's uncle) built another house called Linden Spring nearby, where his son Robert would be raised before continuing westward and eventually becoming Governor of Ohio. By this time, the Lucas family no longer adhered to the Quaker faith, which renounced military involvement and slavery. Both Edward Lucas II and his brother William owned teenaged slaves in the 1787 Virginia tax census decades before this man's birth.

Like his brother, William received a private education appropriate to his class in Shepherdstown, then at Jefferson College at Gettysburg, Pennsylvania (now Dickinson College), but he never graduated. Instead, Lucas returned to Virginia and taught school briefly at Harpers' Ferry, then in 1825 traveled to Winchester, Virginia and attended a private law school run by Judge Henry St. George Tucker. In 1830, this William Lucas married Virginia Ann Bedinger, and they had several children who survived them. The most famous was Daniel Bedinger Lucas, who became a lawyer, Confederate officer, and ultimately a member of the West Virginia Supreme Court.

== Career ==
Admitted to the Virginia bar, Lucas established a private legal practice in Shepherdstown but soon moved to the county seat, Charles Town (now West Virginia) in 1830 and continued to practice there as well as to farm. This William Lucas greatly expanded the acreage he had inherited near the banks of the Shenandoah River with a view to its confluence with the Potomac River at Harpers Ferry, to nearly 2000 acres, and built a house which he called "Rion Hall" near Halltown. By 1850, William Lucas owned seven enslaved adults, ranging from two 45 year old Black man and a 45 year old Black woman, to 17 and 20 year old Black youths and 25 and 17 year old Black women. A decade later he owned 15 enslaved people.

His elder brother, Edward Lucas, who had also studied to become a lawyer but never actually practiced law, instead became a politician, and in 1837 superintendent then paymaster at the U.S. military arsenal at Harpers Ferry. Voters had elected Edward to Congress as a Jacksonian Democrat in 1832 and re-elected him in 1834, when he narrowly defeated John R. Cooke of the newly organized Whig Party. Fellow Democrat James Murray Mason served a single term between the Lucas brothers.

Although Whig candidates swept the county in 1836, Jefferson County voters elected William Lucas as one of their representatives in the Virginia House of Delegates (a part-time position) in 1837. He served a single term before winning election as a Democrat to the United States House of Representatives in 1838, the seat his brother had previously held. However, he lost his bid for re-election in 1840 to Whig Richard W. Barton, a prominent lawyer in Winchester. Undeterred, Lucas again ran for Congress, despite the district's boundaries being changed after the census (and Virginia losing population). Voters from what had become Virginia's 10th Congressional district sent him back to the House in 1842. However, Lucas again failed to win re-election, but was succeeded by his former law student and brother-in-law, Henry Bedinger (who would serve two terms). Lucas also narrowly escaped death on February 28, 1844, when he was among the prominent politicians on the 'Princeton' when a gun exploded, killing two members of President Tyler's cabinet, among many other casualties.

Lucas resumed his lucrative legal practice as well as farmed. Voters elected him as a delegate to the Virginia Constitutional Convention in 1850 and 1851, as one of four delegates elected from the northern Shenandoah Valley delegate district consisting of Jefferson and nearby Berkeley and Clarke Counties. A decade later Lucas ran for the last time, this time on a States' Rights platform to become one of Jefferson County's delegates to the Virginia Secession Convention of 1861. He and Andrew Hunter lost overwhelmingly to Union Conservative Candidates Alfred M. Barbour of Monongalia County and Logan Osburn (who received 1433 and 1350 votes compared to 467 for Hunter and only 430 for Lucas). During the war, six Lucas family members enlisted as privates in the 1st Virginia Cavalry Regiment and William Lucas' son Daniel Bedinger Lucas served for two months in 1861 as secretary to General Henry Wise, previously Virginia's governor.

== Death ==
Lucas survived his wife by many years, as well as the American Civil War, which caused the establishment of the new state of West Virginia. Lucas died at Rion Hall on August 29, 1877. He was buried at Zion Episcopal Churchyard in Charles Town. Rion Hall remains today, as does Zion Episcopal Church, and both are listed on the National Register of Historic Places.

== Bibliography ==
- "Biographical Directory of the United States Congress, 1774 – Present". bioguide.congress.gov. United States Congress. Archived from the original on April 23, 2010.
- Pulliam, David Loyd (1901). The Constitutional Conventions of Virginia from the foundation of the Commonwealth to the present time. John T. West, Richmond. ISBN 978-1-2879-2059-5.

U.S. House of Representatives
Preceded by James M. Mason	Member of the U.S. House of Representatives from Virginia's 15th congressional district March 4, 1839 – March 4, 1841 (obsolete district)	Succeeded by Richard W. Barton
Preceded by John Taliaferro	Member of the U.S. House of Representatives from Virginia's 10th congressional district March 4, 1843 – March 4, 1845	Succeeded by Henry Bedinger
