= James Paull (judge) =

American judge

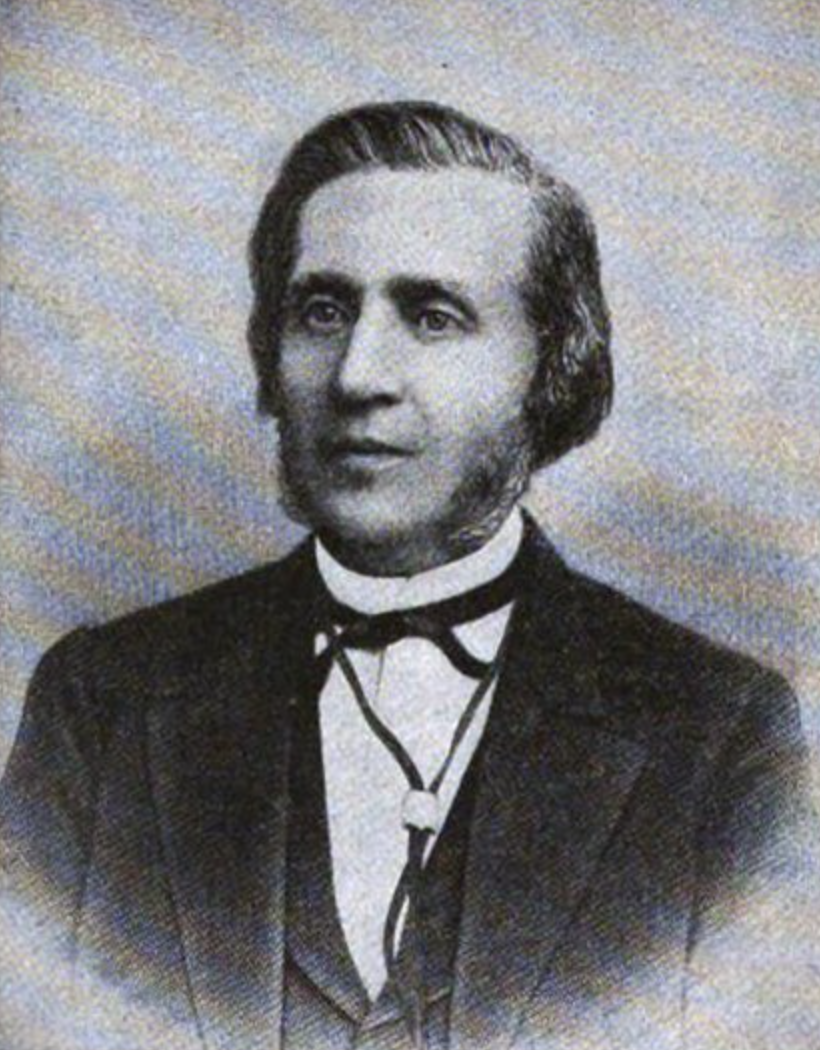

Member of the Virginia House of Delegates from the Ohio County district
- In office 1855–1856
- Preceded by: Thomas M. Gally
- Succeeded by: Andrew P. Woods

Member of the Wheeling Convention
- In office May 13, 1861 – May 15, 1861

Judge West Virginia Court of Appeals
- In office 1873 – May 11, 1875
- Preceded by: Newly established seat
- Succeeded by: Thomas C. Green

Personal details
- Born: July 16, 1818 Belmont, Ohio, US
- Died: May 11, 1875 (aged 56) Wellsburg, West Virginia, US
- Resting place: Stone Church Cemetery, Elm Grove, West Virginia, US
- Party: Democratic
- Spouse(s): Jane A. Fry (d.1860); Eliza J. Ott
- Relatives: James Paull Jr. (grandson)
- Education: Washington College; University of Virginia School of Law
- Profession: Politician, lawyer, judge

James Paull (July 16, 1818 – May 11, 1875) was a lawyer, politician and judge in Wheeling in what became West Virginia during his lifetime. Before the American Civil War, Paull represented Ohio County in the Virginia General Assembly as a Whig, then attended the First Wheeling Convention, which led to the area's secession from Virginia and creation of the state of West Virginia. During his final years, Paull served as a judge of the West Virginia Court of Appeals, having won election as a Democrat, from January 1, 1873, until his death on May 11, 1875.

== Early and family life ==
He was born in Belmont, Ohio, to Col. George Paull (1784-1830) (a veteran of the War of 1812) and his wife Elizabeth (1790-1827), whose ancestors were among the early settlers of Western Pennsylvania. The family moved across the Ohio River to the growing town of Wheeling when this James was a boy. He had an older brother, Rev. Alfred Paull (1815-1872) (who until 1863 served as pastor of Wheeling's 4th Presbyterian Church) and a younger brother Archibald Woods Paul (1822-1844). His paternal grandfather, Col. James Paull (1760-1841), had fought in the American Revolutionary War, including under William Crawford in his disastrous Crawford expedition and defeat on June 5, 1782, on the Sandusky River plains.

Paull was "thoroughly educated in boyhood", attending school in Cross Creek, Pennsylvania, and then entering Washington College in Washington, Pennsylvania, from which he graduated in June 1835. He moved to Wheeling, Virginia, and read law under Zechariah Jacob, as well as studied at the University of Virginia School of Law in Charlottesville. During his legal studies, Paull taught at the Linsly Institute in Wheeling.

Paull was active in his Presbyterian Church and served as an elder for 18 years. He married twice. His first wife, Jane A. Fry (1824-1860), was the daughter of Virginia Judge Joseph L. Fry, and great-granddaughter of Col. Joshua Fry, an English civil engineer, professor at the College of William and Mary and commissioner of the British Crown, whose death during an expedition in 1754 led to the first military command of George Washington. They had three sons: Archibald W. Paull, Joseph F. Paull, and Alfred Paull. Jane died March 9, 1860. On March 19, 1861, Paull married Eliza J. Ott and they had three sons and two daughters: James Paull, Elizabeth, Harry W. Paull, Samuel O. Paull, and Margaret Susan.

== Career ==
After admission to the Virginia bar, Paull practiced law in Wheeling (which had become Virginia's second largest city) with his mentor, as the law firm of Jacob and Paull. Paull became one of the counsel to the Wheeling and Belmont Bridge Company (under experienced attorney and company shareholder Morgan Nelson as well as Charles Wells Russell) in the litigation which began in 1849 after construction of the Wheeling Suspension Bridge.

Ohio County voters also elected Paull (who ran as a Whig) in 1855 to represent them in the Virginia House of Delegates. He served one term alongside John Brady and G.L. Crammer, all three having replaced John C. Campbell and Thomas M. Gally (who had themselves replaced Charles Wells Russell and two colleagues). In the tumultuous politics of the 1857 election, all three were in turn being replaced by Andrew P. Woods and Thomas Sweeney.

During the American Civil War, the state of West Virginia was accepted into the Union after its secession from Virginia pursuant to several conventions in Wheeling, as well as a popular vote in the affected counties (to accept a new Constitution which forbad slavery, among other differences from the Virginia Constitution). James Paull was one of many prominent Unionist Virginians who gathered on May 13, 1861, in the first Wheeling Convention which prepared for the region's secession from Virginia. However, the new state's creation was not fully resolved until litigation in the United States Supreme Court after the war ended.

After adoption of the West Virginia Constitution of 1872, Paull became one of four men elected as judges of the Supreme Court of Appeals of West Virginia (all ran as a Democrats and joined Charles P.T. Moore; none of the Republican judges under the state Constitution of 1863 won re-election). Elected to an eight-year term, Paull "devoted himself wholly to the law", but "the labors of the Supreme Court judgeship proved injurious to his health", and he died in office after serving for just over two years.

== Death and legacy ==
Although Judge Paull avoided ostentation and spent most of his adult life in Wheeling, he moved to a newly built hilltop mansion in nearby Wellsburg in Brooke County about eighteen months before his demise on May 11, 1875. He experienced bronchitis and other health issues for several years before his death, and died at his residence in Wellsburg at the age of 57. He was survived by his second wife and children (his sons becoming prominent businessmen in the Wheeling region), and was buried at the Stone Church Cemetery in Elm Grove in Ohio County. His grandson James Paull Jr. continued the family's political involvement and served in the West Virginia Senate, including as its Speaker from 1943 to 1945. Thomas C. Green of Jefferson County; succeeded Judge Paull on the West Virginia Supreme Court of Appeals in December 1875.
