= Thomas C. Green =

American judge (1820–1889)

Thomas C. Green (November 5, 1820 – December 4, 1889) was a justice of the Supreme Court of Appeals of West Virginia from his appointment on December 24, 1875, until his death on December 4, 1889.

== Early life, military service, and career ==
Born in Fredericksburg, Culpeper County, Virginia, his father, John W. Green, was a judge of the Virginia Court of Appeals. His brother, William Green, was regarded as the finest lawyer in Virginia. He died in late 1889 in Charlestown, West Virginia.

Green entered the practice of law in Jefferson County, Virginia, in 1843, but shortly afterwards removed to Romney, Virginia, where he remained for several years. There he married there the oldest daughter of Colonel Angus William McDonald, and returned to Charles Town, where he continued his practice. When the American Civil War began, he joined the Confederate States Army as a private in an infantry company, and was in the First Battle of Manassas. In the autumn of 1861, he was elected to the Virginia House of Delegates, and served one session, returning to combat when he was not engaged in the legislature. In 1863, he was appointed chief collector of Confederate taxes in Virginia.

On December 24, 1875, Governor John J. Jacob appointed Green to the state supreme court.

== Death and legacy ==
At his death, one West Virginia newspaper declared: "Judge Green stood at the head of his profession in this State, and his private character was as pure as his opinions were able. His place will be hard to fill." Green was a Democrat. Gov. E. Willis Wilson appointed Daniel B. Lucas, who was Green's law partner for many years, to replace him on the court. Green was interred in the Zion Episcopal Churchyard.

Political offices
Preceded by James Paull	Justice of the Supreme Court of Appeals of West Virginia; 1875–1889	Succeeded by Daniel B. Lucas
