= Lewis Steenrod =

American politician

Member of the U.S. House of Representatives from Virginia
- In office March 4, 1839 – March 3, 1845
- Preceded by: William S. Morgan
- Succeeded by: William G. Brown Sr.
- Constituency: 21st district (1839–1843); 15th district (1843–1845)

Member of the Virginia Senate from the Ohio, Hancock, Brooke district
- In office December 5, 1853 – December 6, 1857
- Preceded by: Thomas Sweeney
- Succeeded by: Alfred Caldwell

Personal details
- Born: May 27, 1810 Wheeling, Virginia (now West Virginia), U.S.
- Died: October 3, 1862 (aged 52) Wheeling, Ohio County, West Virginia, U.S.
- Party: Democratic
- Spouse: Mary Neldon
- Profession: Lawyer, politician

Lewis Steenrod (May 27, 1810 – October 3, 1862) was a nineteenth-century politician and lawyer from Virginia, who helped secure Congressional authorization of the Wheeling Suspension Bridge but who later opposed secession of what became West Virginia months before his death.

== Early and family life ==
Born near Wheeling, Virginia (now West Virginia) in 1810, to Daniel Steenrod of New York and his second wife, the former Nancy Ann Gater, who had married in 1806, Lewis Steenrod had seven siblings, including an older brother Edward Gater Steenrod, and elder sisters Catherine and Emma. His sister Mary married the Wheeling postmaster, General Feeney, and their daughter Ann Elizabeth married Congressman and judge George W. Thompson, with whom this Lewis would later work. His father Daniel Steenrod and Col. Moses Shepherd were responsible for building and repairing bridges on the National Road, which had been authorized in 1806 and was completed through Ohio County in 1817-1818, Daniel Steenrod also operated a tavern on the south side of the road, and after Virginia took over responsibility for toll collecting and upkeep, he was still contracting to repair and maintain the road and bridges. In the mid-1830s he also laid out the village of Fulton, and also platted an area called "Steenrod's Island" around a paper mill constructed by Alexander Armstrong in 1836.

Lewis Steenrod attended private schools as a child, then read law. He married Mary Neldon in Athens, Ohio on September 5, 1843, but she soon died at age 23, and their infant son died after just six weeks. In 1850, Lewis lived with his parents and 21 year old nephew Daniel Steenrod in their mansion. In 1860, Lewis Steenrod owned $8000 in real property, and $23,000 in personal property, including slaves (his father owned $150,000 in real estate and $10,000 in personal property and his deaf younger brother George owned $600 in real estate and $5,500 in personal property in nearby Triadelphia, and also had married and had two young sons (Lewis and Daniel) and two daughters (Margaret and Elizabeth)

== Career ==
Admitted to the Virginia bar in 1835, Steenrod began his practice in Wheeling, the county seat of Ohio County.

In 1838 as the Democratic candidate, Steenrod defeated incumbent Whig Richard W. Barton, and served in the United States House of Representatives from 1839 to 1845. He served on the Committee on Roads and Canals as well as Committee on Revolutionary Pensions. He introduced a bill to authorized a bridge across the Ohio River, which would supplant a partial bridge and ferry service between two major sections of the National Road. While the Wheeling Suspension Bridge was completed before that particular legislation passed, a similar bill passed in 1854 and allowed the bridge to remain despite the great displeasure of Pittsburgh, Pennsylvania interests which twice litigated the matter to the United States Supreme Court) because the new bridge interfered with increasingly high steamboat smokestacks.

In part to counteract the initial unfavorable Supreme Court decision, voters elected Steenrod to represent Ohio, Brooke and Hancock Counties in the Virginia Senate from 1853 to 1856, which passed a law favoring the bridge. Afterwards, Steenrod resumed practicing law. However, his outspoken secessionist views (possibly as the result of opposition to the Baltimore and Ohio Railroad which reduced traffic on the National Road), caused the Steenrod brothers to be placed under house arrest during the American Civil War.

== Death and legacy ==
Lewis Steenrod died of tuberculosis at his home near Wheeling, West Virginia on October 3, 1862, and his father two years later. He was interred in Stone Church Cemetery in Elm Grove, West Virginia. His nephew and namesake became Ohio County sheriff.

Steenrod Avenue in Wheeling is named to recognize the family's contributions. Steenrod Elementary School completed in 1919 was named for his father, on land he owned at his death (with an estate worth $200,000), but has now been supplanted by Triadelphia Middle School. The former family home near Wheeling, known as Woodridge was transferred to his brother George W. Steenrod and his wife, but sold in 1874 (after the Panic of 1873) to his brother-in-law Judge George W. Thompson and his wife to pay off debts. In 1880, George Steenrod's daughter Maggie and her husband Platoff Zane owned it, and had many foster children (though none of their own). Sheriff Lewis Steenrod sold a large part of the property to Wheeling for a 150 house subdivision, but sold the house to his son, Dr. Lewis Steenrod and his wife. They sold it to John and Annie McGinnis, who lived in it for decades and made its gardens a showpiece during the 1930s. It was listed on the National Register of Historic Places in 2005. It now houses married and graduate students of Wheeling Jesuit University

U.S. House of Representatives
Preceded by William S. Morgan	Member of the U.S. House of Representatives from Virginia's 21st congressional district March 4, 1839 – March 3, 1843 (obsolete district)	Succeeded by none
Preceded by Richard W. Barton	Member of the U.S. House of Representatives from Virginia's 15th congressional district March 4, 1843 – March 3, 1845	Succeeded by William G. Brown Sr.
