= Virginia's 15th congressional district =

1793–1853 US congressional district

Coordinates: 39°30′N 79°40′W

- Obsolete district
- Created: 1793
- Eliminated: 1853
- Years active: 1793–1853

Virginia's 15th congressional district was a congressional district. It was eliminated in 1853 after the 1850 U.S. census. Its last congressman was Sherrard Clemens.

== List of members representing the district ==
Representative	Party	Years	Cong ress	Electoral history
District established March 4, 1793
James Madison (Montpelier)	Anti-Administration	March 4, 1793 – March 3, 1795	3rd 4th	Redistricted from the 5th district and re-elected in 1793. Re-elected in 1795. Retired.
James Madison (Montpelier)	Democratic-Republican	March 4, 1795 – March 3, 1797	3rd 4th	Redistricted from the 5th district and re-elected in 1793. Re-elected in 1795. Retired.
John Dawson	Democratic-Republican	March 4, 1797 – March 3, 1803	5th 6th 7th	Elected in 1797. Re-elected in 1799. Re-elected in 1801. Redistricted to the 10th district.
John Randolph of Roanoke (Roanoke Plantation)	Democratic-Republican	March 4, 1803 – March 3, 1813	8th 9th 10th 11th 12th	Redistricted from the 7th district and re-elected in 1803. Re-elected in 1805. Re-elected in 1807. Re-elected in 1809. Re-elected in 1811. Redistricted to the 16th district and lost re-election.
John Kerr (Mount Pleasant)	Democratic-Republican	March 4, 1813 – March 3, 1815	13th	Elected in 1813. Lost re-election.
Matthew Clay (Halifax)	Democratic-Republican	March 4, 1815 – May 27, 1815	14th	Elected in 1815. Died.
Vacant		May 28, 1815 – October 29, 1815	14th	
John Kerr (Mount Pleasant)	Democratic-Republican	October 30, 1815 – March 3, 1817	14th	Elected to finish Clay's term. Retired.
William J. Lewis (Lynchburg)	Democratic-Republican	March 4, 1817 – March 3, 1819	15th	Elected in 1817. Retired.
George Tucker (Lynchburg)	Democratic-Republican	March 4, 1819 – March 3, 1823	16th 17th	Elected in 1819. Re-elected in 1821. Redistricted to the 6th district.
John S. Barbour (Culpeper)	Democratic-Republican	March 4, 1823 – March 3, 1825	18th 19th 20th 21st 22nd	Elected in 1823. Re-elected in 1825. Re-elected in 1827. Re-elected in 1829. Re-elected in 1831. Retired.
John S. Barbour (Culpeper)	Jacksonian	March 4, 1825 – March 3, 1833	18th 19th 20th 21st 22nd	Elected in 1823. Re-elected in 1825. Re-elected in 1827. Re-elected in 1829. Re-elected in 1831. Retired.
Edward Lucas (Charlestown)	Jacksonian	March 4, 1833 – March 3, 1837	23rd 24th	Elected in 1833. Re-elected in 1835. Retired.
James M. Mason (Winchester)	Democratic	March 4, 1837 – March 3, 1839	25th	Elected in 1837. Retired.
William Lucas (Charlestown)	Democratic	March 4, 1839 – March 3, 1841	26th	Elected in 1839. Lost re-election.
Richard W. Barton (Winchester)	Whig	March 4, 1841 – March 3, 1843	27th	Elected in 1841. Lost re-election.
Lewis Steenrod (Wheeling)	Democratic	March 4, 1843 – March 3, 1845	28th	Elected in 1843. Retired.
William G. Brown (Kingwood)	Democratic	March 4, 1845 – March 3, 1849	29th 30th	Elected in 1845. Re-elected in 1847. Lost re-election.
Alexander Newman (Wheeling)	Democratic	March 4, 1849 – September 8, 1849	31st	Elected in 1849. Died.
Vacant		September 9, 1849 – November 7, 1849	31st	
Thomas S. Haymond (Fairmont)	Whig	November 8, 1849 – March 3, 1851	31st	Elected to finish Newman's term. Lost re-election.
George W. Thompson (Wheeling)	Democratic	March 4, 1851 – July 30, 1852	32nd	Elected in 1851. Resigned to become Circuit Court judge.
Vacant		July 31, 1852 – December 5, 1852	32nd	
Sherrard Clemens (Wheeling)	Democratic	December 6, 1852 – March 3, 1853	32nd	Elected to finish Thompson's term. Retired.
District dissolved March 4, 1853
