= George M. Bedinger =

American politician

George Michael Bedinger
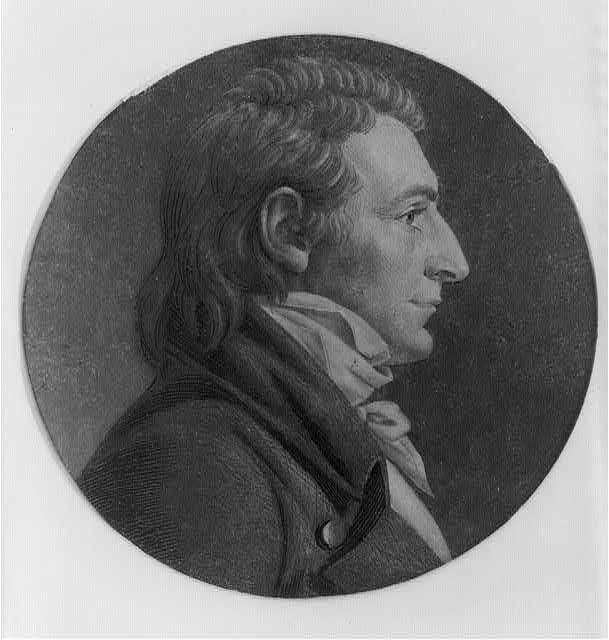

Member of the U.S. House of Representatives from Kentucky's 6th district
- In office March 4, 1803 – March 3, 1807
- Preceded by: District established
- Succeeded by: Solomon P. Sharp

Member of the Virginia House of Delegates from Jefferson County
- In office January 10, 1838 – January 6, 1839 Serving with John Peter
- Preceded by: Thomas Griggs Jr.
- Succeeded by: Bushrod C. Washington

Personal details
- Born: George Michael Bedinger; December 10, 1756 Hanover, Pennsylvania, British America
- Died: December 7, 1843 (aged 86) Blue Licks Springs, Kentucky, U.S.
- Party: Democratic-Republican

George Michael Bedinger (December 10, 1756 – December 7, 1843) was an American military officer and politician who came to oppose the expansion of slavery to Kentucky. He served in both houses of the Kentucky legislature and as a U.S. representative from Kentucky. His nephew Henry Bedinger became a pro-slavery congressman from Virginia.

== Early and family life ==
George M. Bedinger was born December 10, 1756, in Hanover, Pennsylvania, to parents Henry Bedinger (1729–1772) and Magdelena Schlegel (1734–1796), who had emigrated from Alsace. George attended an English school. The family moved to Virginia about 1762 (where his elder brother Henry (1753–1843) would remain). Meanwhile, his father Henry moved the rest of his family to Kentucky in 1779, and settled at Boonesborough.

== Military service ==
During the American Revolutionary War, George M. Bedinger served as adjutant in John Bowman's expedition against Chillicothe in May 1779. He returned to Virginia and served at the siege of Yorktown, and therefore missed the Battle of Blue Licks in Kentucky. During the Northwest Indian War, he was a major in Drake's Regiment in 1791, a major commanding the Winchester Battalion of Sharpshooters in the St. Clair expedition in 1791, and a major commanding the Third Sublegion of the United States Infantry from April 11, 1792, to February 28, 1793.

== Career ==
Bedinger won election to the State house of representatives of the first legislature of Kentucky in 1792. He served in the State senate in 1800 and 1801. He opposed Kentucky becoming a slave state, but was unsuccessful in this effort.

Bedinger was elected as a Democratic-Republican to the Eighth and Ninth Congresses (March 4, 1803 – March 3, 1807). He engaged in agricultural pursuits. While Bedinger inherited several slaves from his brother, he freed the slaves he owned personally when they reached the age of 30, and reportedly offered to pay for their passage to Liberia, though only one accepted.

== Death and legcacy ==
Bedinger died at Blue Licks Springs, Kentucky, December 7, 1843. He was interred in the family cemetery on his farm near Lower Blue Licks Springs, Kentucky.

U.S. House of Representatives
Preceded by District created	Member of the U.S. House of Representatives from Kentucky's 6th congressional district 1803–1807	Succeeded by Solomon P. Sharp
