= Richard Parker (congressman) =

American politician (1810–1893)

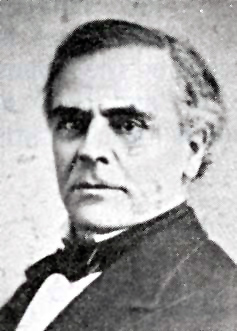
- Born: December 22, 1810
- Died: November 10, 1893 (aged 82); Winchester, Virginia
- Resting place: Mount Hebron Cemetery, Winchester
- Education: University of Virginia
- Occupations: Lawyer, judge, politician
- Known for: Presiding over John Brown's trial
- Spouse: Evalina Tucker Moss
- Father: Richard E. Parker

Richard Parker (December 22, 1810 – November 10, 1893) was a nineteenth-century politician, lawyer, and judge from Virginia.

== Biography ==
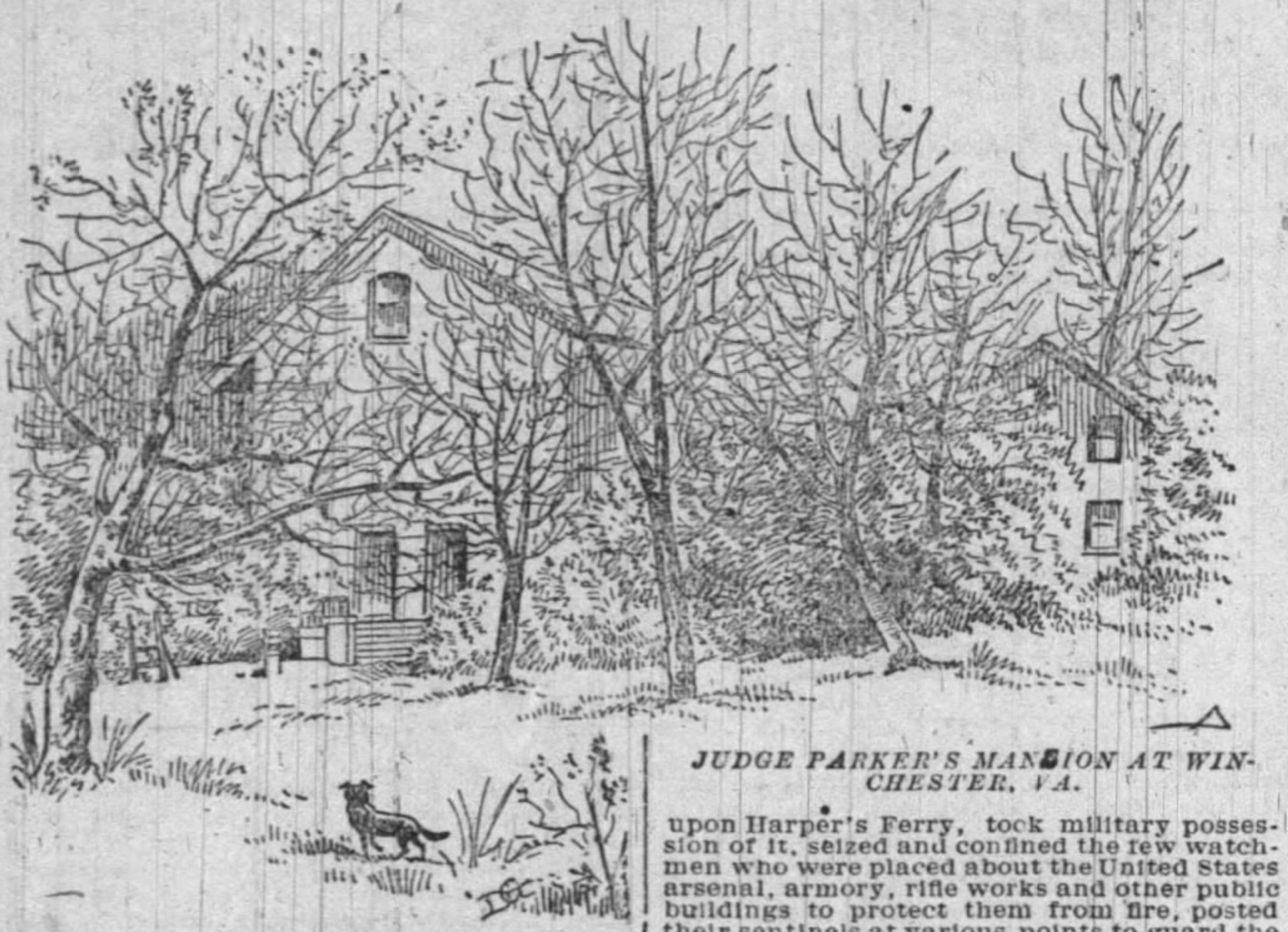
Judge Parker's Winchester mansion

Parker was born in Richmond, Virginia, the son of Judge and Senator Richard E. Parker.

Parker studied law at the University of Virginia, and was admitted to the bar, commencing practice in Berryville, Virginia, near Winchester, where he lived.

He was the paymaster at the Harpers Ferry Armory, and was a slave owner.

He held several local offices before being elected as a Democrat to the United States House of Representatives in 1848, serving from 1849 to 1851. He was elected judge of the thirteenth judicial circuit of Virginia on January 15, 1851. In this capacity, Parker presided over the trials of John Brown and his associates in 1859, sentencing them to death for their raid on nearby Harpers Ferry. In 1888, he published his recollections of the trial.

Parker left the court in 1869, when the Union Army occupying Virginia shut courts down, and resumed practicing law in Winchester, Virginia, until his death there on November 10, 1893. He was interred in Mount Hebron Cemetery in Winchester.

He married Evalina Tucker Moss, but they had no children.

Parker's enslaved worker Presley Dunwood, who drove the carriage that took Judge Parker to court during John Brown's trial, published memoirs.

== Publications ==
- Parker, Richard (1850). Speech of Hon. Richard Parker, of Virginia, on the President's message in relation to California. Delivered in the House of Representatives, Thursday, February 28, 1850. Washington, D.C.

== Archival material ==
- There are 87 items in the John Brown papers at Atlanta University.
- There are 134 items in the Chicago History Museum Research Center.
- There are 38 items in the Stoddert Family papers at the University of Maryland Libraries

U.S. House of Representatives
Preceded by Henry Bedinger	Member of the U.S. House of Representatives from Virginia's 10th congressional district March 4, 1849 – March 3, 1851	Succeeded by Charles J. Faulkner
