= Edward Lucas (American politician) =

American politician

Edward Lucas, Jr.

Member of the U.S. House of Representatives from Virginia's 15th district
- In office March 4, 1833 – March 3, 1837
- Preceded by: John S. Barbour
- Succeeded by: James Murray Mason

Member of the Virginia House of Delegates from Jefferson County
- In office December 6, 1830 – December 4, 1831 Serving with John S. Gallagher
- Preceded by: Bushrod C. Washington
- Succeeded by: Henry Berry
- In office December 6, 1819 – December 1, 1822 Serving with Braxton Davenport, Smith Slaughter
- Preceded by: Daniel Morgan
- Succeeded by: Daniel Morgan

Personal details
- Born: October 20, 1780 Shepherdstown, Virginia, U.S.
- Died: March 4, 1858 (aged 77) Harpers Ferry, Virginia, U.S.
- Party: Jackson Democrat
- Relatives: William Lucas (brother)
- Education: Dickinson College
- Profession: politician, lawyer, soldier, merchant

Military service
- Allegiance: United States
- Branch/service: 4th Virginia militia
- Years of service: 1812-1814
- Rank: first lieutenant
- Battles/wars: Battle of Craney Island; Battle of North Point

Edward Lucas (October 20, 1780 – March 4, 1858) was a nineteenth-century politician, lawyer and military officer from western Virginia, who served in the War of 1812, the Virginia House of Delegates and the U.S. House of Representatives before becoming superintendent of the military arsenal at Harpers Ferry (1837-1841) and then its paymaster until his death. His younger brother William Lucas would also later hold the redistricted congressional seat.

== Early and family life ==
Born in Jefferson County near Shepherdstown, Virginia (now West Virginia) to Robert Lucas and his wife the former Elizabeth Edwards (1745-1808), the younger Lucas is sometimes referred to as Edward Lucas IV. His Quaker grandfather Edward Lucas II moved to Virginia with his Philadelphia-born wife, and his son (this man's father) fought as a patriot during the revolutionary war. He also shared the name with his uncle and some cousins, but after two sons having the name died as infants, this baby received the additional letter as a mystical precaution. Young Ed Lucas received a private education suitable to his class, as did his surviving brother William. He then traveled to Carlisle, Pennsylvania for further studies and graduated from Dickinson College in 1809. He would marry Anna Maria Ronemous. Though their married daughter died in 1844, their three sons all survived the American Civil War not long after this Edward Lucas' death.

== Military service ==
During the War of 1812, he served as a first lieutenant, paymaster and acting captain of the 4th Virginia militia (a/k/a Beatty's). The unit participated in the crucial battles defending Norfolk, Virginia and Baltimore, Maryland.

== Career ==
After the conflict, Lucas read law and was admitted to the Virginia bar. He began his legal practice in Shepherdstown, Virginia (now West Virginia), and continued until 1818, when he decided to concentrate on business pursuits in surrounding Jefferson County. Lucas first won election to the Virginia House of Delegates (a part-time position) in 1819 and continued to win re-election until 1822. He again won election to the House of Delegates in 1830, following adoption of the Virginia Constitution of that year which increased western representation.

In 1832 Lucas ran to represent Virginia's 15th congressional district as a Jacksonian. He won re-election to the United States House of Representatives, and served from 1833 to 1837. He narrowly defeated John R. Cooke, candidate of the new Whig Party in 1834, and who had helped draft the new Virginia constitution. In 1836, Lucas announced his plan to retire instead of seeking re-election. Fellow Jacksonian Democrat James Murray Mason (who would become a U.S. Senator and Confederate diplomat) succeeded him, but the following term his brother William won the (redistricted) Congressional seat.

By that time, Edward Lucas had succeeded General George Rust as superintendent of the Harpers Ferry Armory. Lucas owned an enslaved woman and boy in 1840 census, and three slaves in the 1850 census. In 1841, he became the paymaster for the Harpers Ferry Armory.

== Death and legacy ==
Lucas died at Harpers Ferry, Virginia on March 4, 1858.

His sons Lewis Lucas (who was a boatman on the Potomac River or Chesapeake and Ohio Canal in 1850 and probably hurt economically by the opening of the C&O Railroad just before the war), Edward Lucas IV and Dr. Robert Armistead Lucas all survived the conflict. Confederate volunteers of the younger generation included his nephew Daniel Bedinger Lucas (son of William Lucas, and future West Virginia Supreme Court Justice) who served two months as secretary to Confederate general John Wise (a former Virginia governor) and six privates in the First Virginia Cavalry. Of those, his grandson George B. Lucas (son of Lewis Lucas) was captured of May 31, 1863, released during a prisoner exchange and returned to the battlefront, only to be killed in action on January 18, 1865. His fiddle-playing cousin Robert Rion Lucas (captured on March 23, 1863, while on detached service with Gen. J.E.B. Stuart) was released from Fort Delaware at the war's end (June 1865).

U.S. House of Representatives
Preceded by John S. Barbour	Member of the U.S. House of Representatives from Virginia's 15th congressional district March 4, 1833 – March 3, 1837 (obsolete district)	Succeeded by James M. Mason
