= William J. Lewis =

American politician

William J. Lewis (July 4, 1766 – November 1, 1828) was a U.S. representative from Virginia.

Born in Augusta County, Virginia, Lewis was the son of Major William Lynn Lewis (1724–1811) and Anne Margaret Montgomery (1737–1808). His grandfather was John Lewis (1678–1762). Lewis attended the common schools. He served as member of the Virginia House of Delegates.

Lewis was elected as a Democratic-Republican to the Fifteenth Congress (March 4, 1817 – March 3, 1819). He died at "Mount Athos" plantation, near Lynchburg, Virginia, November 1, 1828. He was interred in a vault blasted out of a solid rock at the summit of "Mount Athos," Virginia.

Mount Athos was destroyed by fire in 1876, and was listed on the National Register of Historic Places in 1975 as an archaeological site.

U.S. House of Representatives
Preceded by John Kerr	Member of the U.S. House of Representatives from Virginia's 15th congressional district 1817–1819	Succeeded by George Tucker
