= Thomas Sweeney (glassmaker) =

American glassmaker and politician (1806–1890)

Member of the Virginia Senate from the Ohio, Hancock, Brooke district
- In office January 12, 1852 – December 5, 1853
- Preceded by: James G. West
- Succeeded by: Lewis Steenrod

Member of the Virginia House of Delegates from the Ohio County district
- In office December 7, 1857 – December 2, 1859
- Preceded by: James Paul
- Succeeded by: Nathaniel Richardson

Personal details
- Born: March 6, 1806 Armagh, County Armagh, Ireland
- Died: May 9, 1890 (aged 84) Wheeling, West Virginia, US
- Party: Whig
- Spouse(s): Rosanah Mathews; Jane Bell McFerran; Anna Elizabeth A. How
- Profession: glassmaker, politician

Thomas Sweeny or Sweeney (March 6, 1806 – May 9, 1890) was a glass manufacturer in what became Wheeling, West Virginia during the American Civil War, who before that war served in both houses of the Virginia General Assembly and ran the North Wheeling Flint Glass Works.

== Early and family life ==
Thomas Sweeney was born in Armagh, Ireland to Thomas Sweeney and Sarah Ann Campbell. His family emigrated to the United States when he was a child. He and his brothers Michael, Campbell and Robert Henry Sweeney lived in Pittsburgh, Pennsylvania, and by 1830 settled near the important Ohio River port of Wheeling in what was then Ohio County, Virginia.

Sweeney married his first wife, Rosanah Mathews in Pittsburgh, and they had four children before her death: Andrew J. Sweeney (1827–1893), Rebecca Sweeney McNaghten (1829-1877), Thomas C. Sweeney Jr. (1832–1908) and Robert H. Sweeney (1835-1883). The widowered Sweeney remarried the following year, to Baltimore-born Jane Bell McFerran, who had sons Thomas Sweeney, Jr. (1849-1874) and John McFerran Sweeney (1851-1895) and daughter Annie Sweeney Fleming (1858-1937). After her death, Sweeney remarried again, to Anna Elizabeth A. How, with whom he had a daughter, Letitia Sweeney Ewing (1876-1959).

The Sweeney mansion was at 847 Main Street in Wheeling. It was demolished in 1875.

== Career ==
Like Pittsburgh upriver, Wheeling and nearby Wellsburg in Brooke County and Martins Ferry, Ohio had several glass furnaces by 1830, which took advantage of the cheap river transportation for raw materials and fuel, as well as the finished glass. In 1830, the Sweeney brothers bought a glass furnace, the North Wheeling Manufacturing Company, and by 1835 had built a new flint window glass factory in the north end of town, which soon manufactured bottles as well. A few years later Plunkett & Miller built a similar factory on Wheeling's southern end, which J.L. Hobbs and J.H. Hobbs acquired by 1845. In 1864, during the American Civil War (in which Wheeling became briefly capital of the new state of West Virginia), William Leighton Jr. of the Hobbs & Hobbs firm designed a new method of producing lime glass that made the previously inferior product suitable for producing tableware and revolutionized the industry. By 1880, six years after Sweeney's retirement and five years after his younger brother's death, the city had three major firms operating seven furnaces which included 72 pots, employed 818 men using a combined capital of $500,522, paid $296,450 in wages and used $192,564 worth of raw material to produce $714,000 worth of wares, or about 7.82% of all glassware sold in the country. About half of all American cut glass tableware was made in either Wheeling or Pittsburgh by the turn of the century.

In 1836, Sweeney was one of eleven commissioners as the town of Wheeling became the city of Wheeling. Sweeney won election to the Virginia Senate in 1851. The state senatorial district that had been represented by Rev. James G. West of Wetzel County was split into several districts after the 1850 census and new state constitution adopted after a constitutional convention that year called to address over-representation of slaveholding interests in the eastern and central portions of the Commonwealth. Sweeney represented Brooke, Hancock and Ohio counties. Wetzel, Marshall and Tyler counties were agglomerated with Marion County and Jefferson Martin won election, but resigned by 1853 and was succeeded by West by the 1853–1854 session; Doddridge County originally in that district was agglomerated with Ritchie, Harrison, Pleasants and Wood counties and represented by Benjamin Bassel. However, Sweeney served only one short term; Wheeling Suspension Bridge advocate Lewis Steenrod succeeded him in 1853. Four years later, Ohio County voters elected Sweeney to serve alongside Andrew F. Woods as their representatives in the Virginia House; they had replaced former mayor James Paul, John Brady and G. L. Crammer in the area's turbulent political climate, and two years later were themselves replaced by Nathaniel Richardson, John Knote and Daniel M. Edgington.

Before the Civil War, the Sweeney firm made three enormous four-foot-wide and nearly five-foot-tall cut leaded glass bowls, in order to showcase their wares. The bowls won prizes at exhibitions in New York and Philadelphia. In 1844 at least one was given to Senator Henry Clay, partly in gratitude for helping establish a tariff on foreign glassware. Over the next decades, two were destroyed in warehouse fires (including the one sent to Clay's estate at Ashland and used to baptize him in 1847). The third adorned Michael Sweeney's tomb in Wheeling's cemetery from 1875 until 1948, when it was moved to the Oglebay glass museum for safekeeping.

In 1858, Michael Sweeney split with his brother. The reasons for the split are a bit murky. One source indicates that Thomas refused Michael a loan to build a mansion. A book by Thomas's grandson indicated that Thomas acquired a patent related to the manufacturing of the glass. Michael, the lead glass man, improved on the patent resulting in a significant profit for the business. Michael argued with Thomas for a fair portion of the profits; Thomas countered, arguing for a reimbursement for the patent that he purchased. The situation came to a head in 1846. The Board of Trade held a banquet to celebrate the new charter plan for Wheeling. The lavish event featured Daniel Webster as the honored guest. Since Thomas was chairman of the board, he took the lead in the hosting the affair and naturally received the accolades from the guests for promoting industry in the new city instead of Michael. The story goes that Michael left the celebration abruptly. This last straw led to arguing that shattered the brothers' relationship. Not long after, in 1848, their business partnership dissolved as well.

After the dissolution, Thomas Sweeney admitted his eldest son Andrew J. Sweeney (who had married the daughter of a prominent Presbyterian minister) as a partner in the family manufacturing firm. The younger Sweeney was an inventor, and had also been appointed Wheeling's mayor in 1855. He would win election as the city's mayor thrice more in the following decades, and promoted improvements including a street railway, electric lighting company, paid fire department, fire alarm telegraph, and many new bridges and shipping facilities. Andrew Sweeney also helped route the Pittsburgh, Cincinnati, Chicago and St. Louis Railroad through Wheeling, over the objection of the long-powerful Baltimore and Ohio Railroad.

Nonetheless, during the American Civil War, Andrew J. Sweeney served as Wheeling's mayor (1861–1863, 1865–1868) as well as a militia colonel. After his father's retirement, his uncle's death and closure of the family glassworks in 1875, Andrew Sweeney became a prominent manufacturer in his own right with the Wheeling Electric Company. In 1873, President Ulysses S. Grant appointed Andrew Sweeney West Virginia's commissioner to the Vienna Exposition, and three years later appointed him to a similar post in the Centennial Exposition at Philadelphia, and in 1878 to the French Exposition at Paris.

== Death and legacy ==
Thomas Sweeney died May 10, 1890. He was the father of ten children and ancestor of many more successful offspring. Thomas's son, Andrew J. Sweeney served as mayor of Wheeling, West Virginia for many years, was a business partner in his father's foundry eventually taking over the leadership role of the company, and was appointed Colonel of the militia during the Civil War. Another son, Thomas Campbell Sweeney, was a prominent riverboat captain during the Civil War and traveled up and down the Ohio and Mississippi rivers during his career. Yet another son, John F. Sweeney, founded the Equitable Life Assurance Society. Grandson Walter Campbell Sweeney enjoyed an illustrious military career, rising to the rank of brigadier general. Walter Campbell Sweeney's son Walter Campbell Sweeney, Jr. also served in the military, eventually commanding the Tactical Air Command for the U.S. Air Force and achieving the rank of four-star general. Another grandson, Andrew Thomas Sweeney (d. 1918; Andrew J. Sweeney's youngest son and married to Kate B. Lukens of another prominent industrial family) was the Ohio County sheriff after serving six years as mayor of Wheeling. A great-grandson, Thomas Bell Sweeney, Jr., served in the West Virginia House of Delegates from the 1st District from 1939 to 1942. Sweeney and many of his family members are buried in Greenwood Cemetery in Wheeling, West Virginia.
