= Henry Bedinger =

American politician

Henry Bedinger III

Member of the U.S. House of Representatives from Virginia's 10th district
- In office March 4, 1845 – March 4, 1849
- Preceded by: William Lucas
- Succeeded by: Richard Parker

United States Minister to Denmark
- In office 1853–1857
- President: Franklin Pierce
- Preceded by: Henry Bedinger
- Succeeded by: James M. Buchanan

Personal details
- Born: February 3, 1812 Shepherdstown, Virginia (now West Virginia), US
- Died: November 26, 1858 (aged 46) Shepherdstown, Virginia (now West Virginia), US
- Party: Democratic
- Spouse(s): Margaret Rust Bedinger; Caroline Lawrence Bedinger
- Children: 6, including Danske Dandridge
- Profession: Politician, lawyer, diplomat

Henry Bedinger III (February 3, 1812 – November 26, 1858) was an American planter, politician, lawyer and diplomat. Born in the part of Virginia that became West Virginia not long after his death, he served two terms in the U.S. House of Representatives representing Virginia's 10th congressional district, then became the first United States minister to Denmark. His uncle was fellow planter, soldier and Kentucky congressman George Michael Bedinger.

== Early and family life ==
Born near Shepherdstown, Virginia (now West Virginia), he was the fourth of five sons and twelfth of 13 children born to the former Sarah Rutherford (daughter of the lower Shenandoah Valley's first congressman) and her husband Daniel Bedinger. Although his father died when Henry Bedinger was young, he received a private education appropriate to his class at private academies in Shepardstown and across the Potomac River in Frederick, Maryland. When he turned 18 years old, he received a job as assistant clerk in the Hampshire County, Virginia clerk's office at Romney. His grandfather, the first Henry Bedinger (1729-1772) had emigrated from the Alsace region. His uncles Major Henry Bedinger (1753-1843) and George M. Bedinger had fought as patriots in the American Revolutionary War, with Henry Bedinger then briefly representing Berkeley County part-time in the Virginia House of Delegates, as well as owned one slave in the 1787 tax census for Berkeley County, and helped found the town of Meckenburg in 1794 (which became Shepherdstown). When about twenty, this Henry Bedinger moved to the Jefferson county seat, Charles Town, and began reading law under the supervision of his brother-in-law William Lucas.

Bedinger married twice. His first wife was Margaret Rust, the sister of his law partner George Rust and daughter of General George Rust. They married on June 5, 1839, and she bore a son and two daughters before dying on May 21, 1843. His second wife was Caroline Bowne Lawrence, daughter of New York Democratic Congressman John W. Lawrence. They married on October 14, 1847, at "Willowbank" in Flushing, New York, and had one son and two daughters.

== Career ==
Admitted to the Virginia bar in 1838, Bedinger began a private legal practice in Shepherdstown. His law partner and soon brother in law was George Rust. Bedinger lived in Shepherdstown during the enumerations of both the 1840 and 1850 federal censuses. In the more detailed 1850 census, his household also included New York born Caroline Bedinger, age 22, and Mary McKenna, a 27 year old Virginia born free woman (presumably a servant), and a nine year old enslaved girl. A decade earlier, Bedinger and his first wife lived with two enslaved blacks (a man and woman both between 10 and 24 years old), and his 60+ year old mother lived nearby with a free white female in her twenties and nine slaves.

In 1844, Bedinger running as a Democrat, defeated his legal mentor, and won a seat in the United States House of Representatives. He also defeated a Whig opponent in 1847, serving from 1845 to 1849. While in Congress, Bedinger denounced Whig efforts to restrict voting by Irish and German immigrants, such as his family and many neighbors. Furthermore, he endorsed the Walker Tariff of 1846 that reduced duties on some imported goods, as well as applauded Texas's annexation and admission as a slave state. Although Bedinger supported President James K. Polk's expansionist policy in the Pacific Northwest, he advised against confronting Great Britain concerning the Oregon Territory.

After losing his next reelection campaign, Bedinger resumed practicing law, at first in New York, then back in Virginia. Fellow Democrat, President Franklin Pierce, appointed him Chargé d'Affaires to Denmark in May 1853. The following year he received a promotion (and salary increase) to minister plenipotiary, as he had become a favorite at the court of King Frederick VII and was engaged in negotiation for the abolition of the Danish Sound Dues, a toll exacted on all ships navigating between the North Sea and Baltic Sea. The annual assessment for U.S. ships was about $100,000 and Bedinger announced that the U.S. would abrogate its 1826 commercial treaty with Denmark. This prompted Denmark to call a general European conference at which Denmark agreed to abolish the duty in exchange for other participants agreeing to compensate the country for maintaining the channel and lighthouses. Although the United States did not participate in the European conference, Bedinger arranged a bilateral agreement which gave American ships free passage in exchange for a small contribution to the general fund which the European treaty created. Thus Bedinger became the first United States Ambassador to Denmark, effectively from 1853 to 1858.

Despite his diplomatic triumph, Bedinger found his salary did not even cover his expenses in Denmark and so resigned, agreeing to remain in Denmark until his successor's appointment and confirmation, which occurred in 1858. Not long after his resignation as a diplomat, Bedinger was named superintendent of the United States armory at Harpers Ferry, not far from his Shepherdstown home.

== Death and legacy ==
At the festivities welcoming Bedinger home to Shepardstown on November 5, which included political speeches as well as an outdoor barbecue and bonfire despite cold wet weather, Bedinger became sick. He died three weeks later of pneumonia on November 26, 1858, and was interred in the family cemetery at Bedford.

U.S. House of Representatives
Preceded by William Lucas	Member of the U.S. House of Representatives from Virginia's 10th congressional district March 4, 1845 – March 4, 1849	Succeeded by Richard Parker
Diplomatic posts
Preceded by Miller Grieve	United States Ambassador to Denmark; May 24, 1853 – August 10, 1858	Succeeded by James M. Buchanan
