= James Paull (West Virginia politician) =

American politician (1901–1983)

James Paull Jr. (May 3, 1901 – March 8, 1983) was a lawyer and Democratic politician who served as for twelve years in the West Virginia Senate representing Brooke County, the final two (1943 to 1945) as president of that body.

== Early and family life ==
He was born in Wellsburg, West Virginia on May 3, 1901, one of two children of James Paull and Mariana Jacob Paull of Wellsburg. His father was an important and successful business man, and his grandfather, Judge James Paull (1818–1875), had been a respected lawyer and politician in the Ohio River valley who served as a West Virginia Supreme Court justice.

Paull graduated from Washington & Jefferson College, then Yale Law School. On September 5, 1934, he married Helen Catherine Prugh of Pittsburgh, Pennsylvania, and they had four children: James III, Laura, Helen and Robert.

== Career ==
After admission to the West Virginia bar, Paull practiced law in nearby Wheeling, West Virginia. In 1932, during the Great Depression, he won election to the West Virginia Senate, and was re-elected to that part-time position several times, representing the 1st state senatorial district until the end of World War II. During his final two years, fellow state senators elected him as their president.

In 1951, Paull joined Eagle Manufacturing Company, which his father had founded in Wellsburg in 1894, and became its president. He was a prominent and well-respected member of the community, active in civic organizations including the Freemasons, Lions and Beta Theta Pi, and held leadership positions in West Virginia business and political organizations.

== Death and legacy ==
James Paull died in 1983, survived by his four children, and eight grandchildren. He was buried at the family grave site in Wellsburg.

Political offices
Preceded by Byron B. Randolph	President of the West Virginia Senate; 1943–1945	Succeeded by Arnold M. Vickers
