= Bushrod C. Washington =

American politician

Bushrod Corbin Washington

Member of the Virginia House of Delegates from the Jefferson County, Virginia district
- In office December 7, 1829-December 5, 1830 Serving with Daniel Morgan
- Preceded by: Carver Willis
- Succeeded by: Edward Lucas Jr.
- In office January 7, 1839-December 5, 1830 Serving with George Reynolds
- Preceded by: William Lucas
- Succeeded by: William C. Worthington

Personal details
- Born: December 25, 1790 Westmoreland County, Virginia, U.S.
- Died: July 27, 1851 (aged 60) Charles Town, Virginia, U.S.
- Resting place: Zion Episcopal Churchyard, Charles Town, Jefferson County, West Virginia
- Spouse(s): Annamaria Thomasina Blackburn (1790-1833); Maria Powell Harrison (1791-1847)
- Profession: Planter; politician

Bushrod Corbin Washington (December 25, 1790 – July 27, 1851) was a Virginia planter and politician, nephew of Supreme Court Justice Bushrod Washington, and grandfather of Confederate soldier and author Bushrod C. Washington (1839–1919) also discussed below.

== Early life and family ==
Born at a plantation in Westmoreland County, Virginia, to the former Hannah Lee and her husband Corbin Washington, he was their third and longest living son and named for his father's elder brother, Bushrod Washington, who would soon become a justice of the United States Supreme Court. The elder Bushrod Washington and this man's father in 1787 had basically each inherited from their father John Augustine Washington about half of the lands acquired by their grandfathers (Augustine Washington and John Bushrod). Some of the lands were in Westmoreland County in Virginia's Tidewater region, but Corbin Washington at the time of his father's death was living and handling property much further up the Potomac River in lesser developed western Virginia, near Berkeley Springs, in what was then vast Berkeley County, Virginia (and from which Jefferson County would be created in 1802). Although his uncle Bushrod Washington had married, and in 1802 would finally inherit Mount Vernon plantation from his late uncle George Washington (who had given his wife, Martha Custis a life estate and who died in 1802), he and his wife had no children.

His father Corbin Washington died when this Bushrod was only nine, and his widow died months later, possibly both at a plantation house called at that time "Selby" and in Fairfax County, Virginia, near plantations of her Lee relatives. Hannah Lee, like her husband, was born to the First Families of Virginia, the daughter of Richard Henry Lee, who unfortunately had many financial problems after the Revolutionary War and whose lands would be sold at auctions in both Westmoreland and Fairfax counties after he died. Hannah Lee Washington preferred society in the Tidewater region, or among her relatives, or in the city of Alexandria to primitive Berkeley County. Her first two sons were named after her father (Richard Henry Lee Washington) and her husband's father (John Augustine Washington). This Bushrod Washington and his brothers received a private education suitable for their class, as well as inherited land and slaves from their parents.

Complicating matters, his aunt Jane Washington Washington (who became the first of three wives of her cousin William Augustine Washington) also had a son named Bushrod Washington (1785–1831), who was also born in Westmoreland County but died in Fairfax County. Although neither was technically the elder Bushrod Washington's son, officials in Fairfax County taxed one of the men as "Bushrod Washington Jr.", perhaps because his uncle raised his orphaned nephews.

One of the two cousins named Bushrod Washington served as an ensign and was promoted 2nd lieutenant in Green's Regiment of Mounted Virginia Infantry during the War of 1812.

== Personal life ==
Bushrod and his slightly older brother John married sisters, both daughters of Col. Thomas Blackburn, who had served as an aide-de-camp to General Washington (before his presidency) and whose plantation in Prince William County on the King's Highway between their Westmoreland County lands and Mount Vernon was named Rippon Lodge. Specifically, Annamaria Thomasina Blackburn (1790–1833) married Bushrod Washington in 1810 and they had a daughter, Hannah Lee Washington Alexander (1811–1881) and a son Thomas Blackburn Washington (1812–1854) who survived their parents.

Three years after the death of his brother John at Mount Vernon and two years after his wife Annamaria's death, in 1835, Washington married again, this time in Loudoun County to Maria Powell Harrison (1791–1847), also of the First Families of Virginia, but they did not have any children.

== Career ==
Not long after their eldest brother Henry Lee Washington died in 1817, this Bushrod and his slightly older brother John decided to move with their growing families to their Jefferson County land, and build mansions near each other. John named his Blakeley, and though it survives today, it was not as grand as Bushrod's mansion, in part because John knew that he would inherit Mount Vernon upon the death of his jurist uncle Bushrod (which happened in 1829, although John would only live another three years and his namesake son J.A. Washington III would agree to sell it to the Mount Vernon Ladies' Association in 1858 but died at the Battle of Cheat Mountain in September 1861 before the association could raise the funds to complete the transaction). This Bushrod named his mansion Claymont Court and spent $30,000 as well as used the labor of his 90 slaves to build what some people called his "Folly", in part because of its pretentious size, luxury and grounds. The house burned down in 1838, but Bushrod rebuilt it in brick, and it survives today. Notwithstanding his use of enslaved labor described below, Bushrod C. Washington became a charter member of the local chapter of the American Colonization Society in 1819, and his namesake uncle was the national president.

By 1829, Bushrod C. Washington had completed his move to Jefferson County, and voters there elected him as one of their representatives in the Virginia House of Delegates. However, he was not re-elected following the Virginia Constitutional Convention of 1829–20, although after his second marriage he again won election for a single term in 1839.

To the extent that any census characterized his occupation, it was that of farmer, and Washington farmed using enslaved labor, and appears to have sold slaves to rebuild his mansion as well as finance his lifestyle, else many escaped. In the 1810 census, although he had not yet reached the legal age of 21, this man owned 17 slaves in Fairfax County. A decade later, he owned 15 slaves in Fairfax County. and 80 slaves in what had become Jefferson County, Virginia. In 1830, this Bushrod Washington may have owned 24 slaves in Fairfax County, and more than 64 slaves in Jefferson County. The decrease in his slaveholdings continued in 1840, when Washington owned 40 enslaved people in Jefferson County, but none in Fairfax County. He owned 26 enslaved people in Jefferson County in 1850, the final census of his life, and his eldest son, Thomas B. Washington, who would inherit Claymont Court, owned 21 slaves nearby in 1850.

== Death and legacy ==
After surviving both his wives, Bushrod C. Washington died in Charles Town, the Jefferson County seat, in 1851. He was buried in the Zion Episcopal Churchyard.

== C.S.A. Lt. Bushrod C. Washington (1839–1919) ==
This Bushrod C. Washington lived to see his son Thomas B. Washington marry and name his eldest son after his father in 1839. Thomas B. Washington inherited Claymont Court and continued to farm until his death in 1854. His eldest son, the youngest notable Bushrod C. Washington (1839–1919) would become a Confederate lieutenant (volunteering as a private in the 2nd Virginia Infantry and transferring to the 12th Virginia Cavalry where with J.E.B. Stuart's recommendation he received a lieutenant's commission and promotion). Unlike his younger brothers CSA Sgt. George Washington (1842-KIA June 30, 1863) and Pvt. James C. Washington (who died imprisoned at Fort McHenry, Baltimore in 1865), B.C. Washington survived not only being taken prisoner at the Battle of Kernstown and a wound at Battle of Todd's Tavern on May 6, 1864, but was paroled at Winchester on May 4, 1865, and received a federal pardon in 1866. Unless Thomas' estate was insolvent, digitization or other problems may have causes his heirs' nonappearance in the 1860 slave census (the largest slaveowner of that surname in Jefferson County that being Richard Washington with 27 slaves and Lewis Washington with half that number also being of unknown relation). Postwar financial difficulties may have caused Claymont Court's sale for $10,000 (~$232,801 in 2024) in 1871. This youngest notable Bushrod C. Washington became a lawyer as well as published books about the Lost Cause, Virginia law, and his famous relative. Unlike his grandfather and great uncle, he did not serve in the Virginia House of Delegates (in part because Jefferson County seceded from Virginia during the American Civil War and became part of the new state of West Virginia). He was still in Jefferson County in 1890 and 1900, and was one of the charter members of the Charles Town Mining, Manufacturing and Improvement Company, but died two decades later in Almira, a railroad stop in eastern Washington state, where his son Nathaniel had moved his family.
