= James Paul (footballer) =

Scottish footballer

Personal information
- Full name: E. P. James Paul
- Place of birth: Scotland
- Position: Centre forward

Senior career*
Years	Team	Apps	(Gls)
1932–1933	Queen's Park	19	(11)

International career
1932–1934	Scotland Amateurs	2	(2)
- * Club domestic league appearances and goals

E. P. James Paul was a Scottish amateur footballer who played as a centre forward in the Scottish League for Queen's Park. He was capped by Scotland at amateur level. Paul's first cap, a 3–1 defeat to Denmark in which he scored, is regarded as an official international by the DBU.

== Career statistics ==
Appearances and goals by club, season and competition
Club	Season	League			Scottish Cup		Other		Total	
Club	Season	Division	Apps	Goals	Apps	Goals	Apps	Goals	Apps	Goals
Queen's Park	1932–33	Scottish Division One	14	6	0	0	0	0	14	6
Queen's Park	1933–34	Scottish Division One	5	5	0	0	0	0	5	5
Career total			19	11	0	0	0	0	19	11
