= Clarens (Alexandria, Virginia) =

Federal-style mansion in Virginia, U.S.

Clarens Estate
- Location within Alexandria Location within Virginia

General information
- Architectural style: Nineteenth Century Federal Style
- Location: 318 N. Quaker Lane, Alexandria, Virginia
- Coordinates: 38°48′45″N 77°5′25″W
- Construction started: 1814
- Completed: 1816

Clarens or the Clarens Estate is a 19th-century Federal-style mansion in Alexandria, Virginia. Clarens is best known as the residence of James Murray Mason (November 3, 1798 – April 28, 1871), a United States representative and United States senator from Virginia and grandson of George Mason, a Founding Father of the United States.

While it was located within Fairfax County, Virginia, Clarens is now located inside the boundaries of the independent city of Alexandria at 318 North Quaker Lane.

== History ==
Clarens was constructed between 1814 and 1816 in what was then Fairfax County, Virginia, three miles (5 km) to the west of Alexandria. The neighborhood later became known as Seminary Hill because of the proximity to the Virginia Theological Seminary. Reverend George Archibald Smith operated his prominent "Fairfax School" at Clarens. Notable Fairfax School attendees included George Washington Custis Lee and George M. Dallas. The school was in operation from 1850 until 1861. During the American Civil War, Clarens was used as a hospital for Union Army soldiers.

After the war, James Murray Mason selected Clarens as the estate at which he planned to retire. On September 24, 1869, Mason officially took possession of Clarens. While residing at Clarens, one of Mason's chief occupations was his correspondences. Former Confederate President Jefferson Davis visited Clarens in 1870 for his final meeting with Mason and Confederate Army General Samuel Cooper. Confederate Army General Robert E. Lee also visited Mason at Clarens after the war. Mason died at Clarens on April 28, 1871.

After Mason's death, Clarens subsequently became a girls school. The school reopened in 1878 as Worthington School and lasted for 26 years. It was later owned by William G. Thomas. Upon his sale of the property in the late 1980s, Clarens was subdivided. The mansion is currently located on approximately 3.5 acres (1.4 ha).

Before Thomas bought Clarens it was owned by Conrad M Strong; after his death it passed to his second wife Edna Johnson Strong. Mr Strong bought it from his cousin Colonel Byrd Willis, with a contingency that his wife Ann Crenshaw Willis live in the wing until she died. This she did. Mr Strong was the great great nephew of George Washington. His mother, Mary Byrd Dallas, was the daughter of Commandore Alexander James Dallas, [brother to the vice-president] and Mary Byrd Willis. His first wife, Frances T. Perry was the daughter of General Edward A. Perry [of civil war fame] Mr Strong built the guest house, the well house with bridge over a stream, bell tower, colonnade, potting house and log cabin on the crest of the hill overlooking the valley. He designed the circular drive, low walls, and laid out the extensive gardens, field of daffodils, large rose garden etc.
