= John Kerr (Virginia politician) =

American politician (1782–1842)

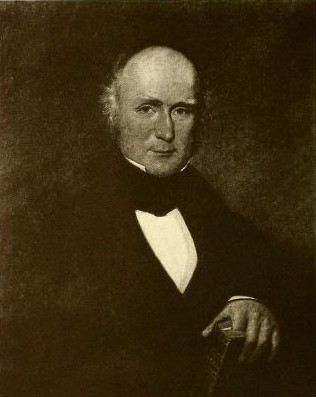

Member of the U.S. House of Representatives from Virginia's 15th district
- In office March 4, 1813 – March 4, 1815
- Preceded by: John Randolph of Roanoke
- Succeeded by: Matthew Clay
- In office October 30, 1815 – March 4, 1817
- Preceded by: Matthew Clay
- Succeeded by: William J. Lewis

Personal details
- Born: August 4, 1782 Caswell County, North Carolina, US
- Died: September 29, 1842 (aged 60) Danville, Pittsylvania County, Virginia, US
- Resting place: Yanceyville, Caswell County, North Carolina
- Spouse: Elizabeth Williams
- Children: 2 sons including John Kerr Jr., 4 daughters

Military service
- Allegiance: United States
- Branch: North Carolina Militia
- War of 1812: War of 1812

John Kerr (August 4, 1782 – September 29, 1842) was a Baptist minister who also served two term in the U.S. House of Representatives representing Virginia's 15th congressional district.

== Early life and education ==
Kerr was born near Yanceyville, in Caswell County, North Carolina across the Dan River from Virginia's southern border. His father, also John Kerr, operated a plantation in Caswell County, North Carolina using enslaved labor. He received a private education suitable for his class, as well as studied theology.

== Career ==
After being licensed as a Baptist minister in 1802, in 1805 Kerr accepted a position in Halifax County, Virginia.

This John Kerr was elected a U.S. Representative for Virginia's 15th Congressional district and served from March 4, 1813, to March 3, 1815, and after winning re-election, from October 30, 1815, to March 3, 1817.

He then resumed his ministry and became pastor of the Baptist churches of Arbor and Mary Creek, before moving to Richmond, Virginia in March 1825, where be served a pastor of the First Baptist Church until resigning in 1832. In the 1830 U.S. Census, he owned 11 slaves in Richmond.

He relocated to a farm in Pittsylvania County, Virginia near Danville in 1836.

== Personal life ==
He married Elizabeth Williams, whose grandfather Robert Williams had been a prominent patriot in Pittsylvania County during the American Revolutionary War. She bore two sons, Nathaniel Williams Kerr and John Kerr, Jr. who also would become a U.S. Congressman. Bartlett Yancey was his cousin and, and John H. Kerr would be his grand-nephew. A native of the area, Kerr was licensed as a minister in 1802 and moved to Halifax County, Virginia in 1805; he later lived in Pittsylvania County, Virginia as well.

== Death ==
Kerry died at his home near Danville, but his remains were returned to the family plot in Yanceyville.

U.S. House of Representatives
Preceded by John Randolph	Member of the U.S. House of Representatives from Virginia's 15th congressional district March 4, 1813 - March 3, 1815	Succeeded by Matthew Clay
Preceded by Matthew Clay	Member of the U.S. House of Representatives from Virginia's 15th congressional district October 30, 1815 - March 3, 1817	Succeeded by William J. Lewis
