= James A. Paul =

American writer (born 1941)

James A. Paul (born June 10, 1941) is a writer and non-profit executive who has worked throughout his career in the field of international relations and global policy.

Paul was born in New York City and graduated from Phillips Exeter Academy and earned a B.A. from Harvard College in 1963. He went on to earn an M.A. at Oxford and a Ph.D. from New York University in 1975 with a specialty in comparative politics.

Between 1972 and 1976, Paul was Lecturer and then assistant professor of Political Science at Empire State College of the State University of New York. In 1976, he took a position with the Middle East Research and Information Project (MERIP) as a member of the Editorial Committee of the magazine MERIP Reports (later Middle East Report). Paul later served on the MERIP Board and was appointed executive director of the organization in 1985. From 1989 to 1993, he worked full-time as a free-lance writer and consultant. Between 1993 and 2012, he served as founding executive director of Global Policy Forum, an organization that monitors policy-making at the United Nations.

Paul has served on many boards and committees. He was chair of the Board of Trustees of the World Fellowship Center, member of the Committee for an Exploratory Study of Graduate Education in Political Science of the American Political Science Association and member of the Editorial Committee of Peuples Méditerranéens. For many years, he has been involved in New York City housing issues as a leader of the Trinity House Tenants’ Association. From 1995 to 1999, Paul was the representative of the Paris-based International Federation of Human Rights at UN headquarters. Since 1995, he has frequently served as Chair of the NGO Working Group on the Security Council and he is currently vice-chair of the group. He is also Convener of the NGO Working Group on Food and Hunger and serves as board Chair of the Repast Baroque Ensemble. His honors include the World Hunger Media Award and a "Peacemaker" award by the Nuclear Age Peace Foundation.

Paul gives many interviews to the print and broadcast media. He has authored well over a hundred articles and reviews in academic journals, magazines and other print media, and he has written dozens of policy papers for Global Policy Forum. He has spoken and written extensively on Iraq, oil, the UN Security Council, UN finance, and the hunger/food crisis. He has served as an editor of the Oxford Companion to Politics of the World (1993, second edition 2001). He wrote Syria Unmasked (1991) and Humanity Comes of Age (1994).

== Selected publications ==
- With Katarina Wahlberg: A New Era of World Hunger? – The Global Food Crisis Analyzed (2008)
- With Celine Nahory: Towards a Democratic Reform of the UN Security Council (2005)
- NGOs and the Security Council (2004)
- With Marianna Quenemoen: The Fall of the Dollar (2003)
- With John Rempel, Richard Moran, et al.: Iraq Sanctions: Humanitarian Implications and Options for the Future (2002)
- With Katarina Wahlberg: Global Taxes for Global Priorities (2002)
- NGOs and Global Policy-Making (2000)
- Small States and Territories (2000)
- With Jason Garred: Making Corporations Accountable (2000)
- With Jens Martens: Coffers are not Empty: financing for sustainable development and the role of the United Nations (1998)
- Nations and States (1996)
- With Susanne Paul: The World Bank and the Attack on Pensions in the Global South (1994)
