= Daniel B. Lucas =

American judge (1836–1909)

Daniel Bedinger Lucas
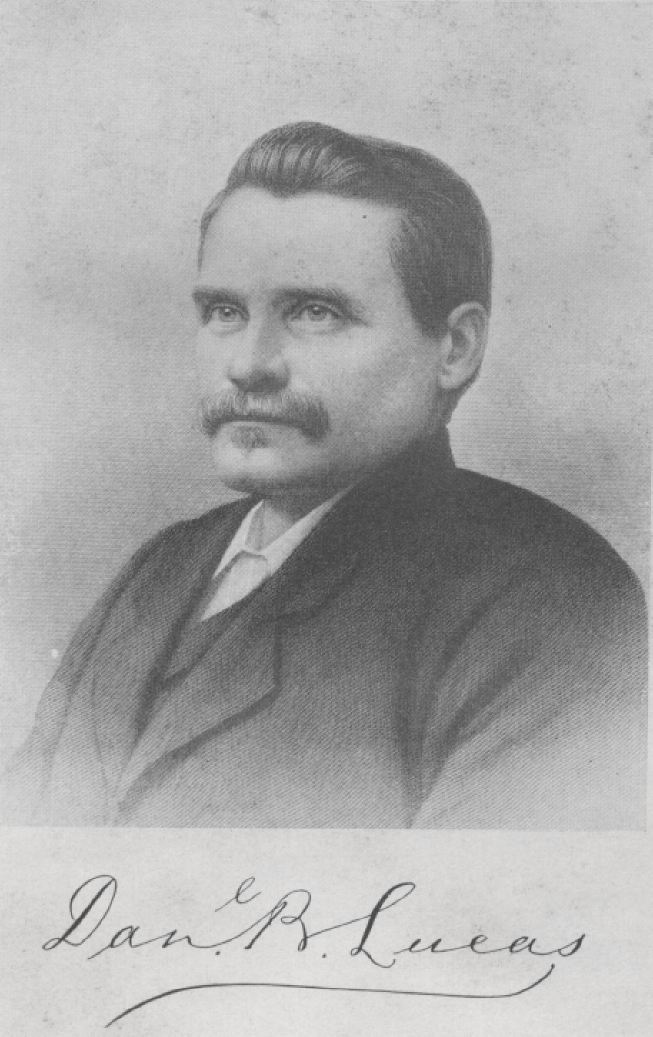
- Born: March 16, 1836; Charles Town, Virginia
- Died: June 24, 1909 (aged 73); Charlestown, West Virginia
- Occupations: Poet, soldier, lawyer
- Writing career
- Period: 1865-1909

Daniel Bedinger Lucas (March 16, 1836 in Rion Hall near Charles Town, Virginia – June 24, 1909 in Charles Town, West Virginia), was a Confederate officer, poet, lawyer and ultimately justice of the West Virginia Supreme Court. He was the son of congressman William Lucas.

== Biography ==
Daniel Lucas graduated from the University of Virginia and earned his law diploma from Washington College and graduated in 1856. He studied under Judge John W. Brockenbrough of Lexington and was admitted to the bar in 1859. He served with General Henry A. Wise with the Confederates during the Civil War in the Kanawha campaign of 1861. Late in the war he escaped a blockade of Virginia to aid his college friend John Yates Beall, who had been arrested as a spy. He left Richmond on January 1, 1865, and crossed the Potomac River through the ice in a small skiff. He was not allowed to assist in the defense of Beall by General John Adams Dix, and resided in Canada some months.

Beall was executed on Governor's Island in New York on February 24, 1865. Unable to return to Virginia, Lucas composed his most famous poem "The Land Where We Were Dreaming" shortly after the surrender of General Lee at Appomattox. His work often earned him the epithet "The Poet Laureate of the Lost Cause", a title he shares with several other Southern writers. When he returned to West Virginia the proscription on ex-Confederates in the practice of law prevented him from resuming his career until 1870, when restrictions were lifted. He returned to his law practice and was elected to the West Virginia Legislature from 1884 to 1887.

In 1887, he strongly opposed Johnson N. Camden, whom he considered an ally of Standard Oil. This led Governor Emanuel Willis Wilson to appoint Daniel Lucas to the United States Senate. The legislature, however, decided instead to select Charles J. Faulkner. Governor Wilson appointed Lucas to the Supreme Court of Appeals on December 11, 1889. Lucas also served as President of the Court during his service.

== Poetry ==
"The Land Where We Were Dreaming" was first published in the Montreal Gazette and was reprinted widely in the United States and England. It was dated "Chambly, June 1865".

In 1869, he published a collection called The Wreath of Eglantine. The book's first part contains poetry by his sister, Virginia Bedinger Lucas, who had died young (she was born in 1838 and died at age 27) but had published some poems in various Southern journals under the pen name "Eglantine"; this first section is called "The Wreath of Eglantine". The second part of the volume is his own work, in three sections: "Patriotic and National Poems" (poetry inspired by the Lost Cause), "Tintographic Melodies" (lyrical and meditative poems, including an elegy on his sister), and "Saint Agnes of Guienne" (a long poem based on the life of Agnes of Poitou). His poems from that book, and his published and unpublished poetry, were edited and republished by Charles W. Kent, then of the University of Virginia, in 1913.

His work on this theme resulted in frequent requests for memorial poems for dedications, such as the consecration of the Stonewall Cemetery in Winchester, Virginia in 1866, and the dedication of the Confederate Monument in Charlestown, West Virginia in 1871. Further works included such poems as Jackson's Grave and A.P.Hill.

- The Wreath of Eglantine, and Other Poems (Baltimore: Kelly, Piet & Company, 1869)
- The Maid of Northumberland: A Dramatic Poem (New York: G.P. Putman's Sons, 1879)
- Ballads and Madrigals (New York: Pollard & Moss, 1884)
- The Land Where We Were Dreaming (Boston: Roger G. Badger/Gorham Press, 1913)

== Prose ==
- Memoir of John Yates Beall: His Life; Trial; Correspondence; Diary; and Private Manuscript Found among His Papers, including his own account of the raid on Lake Erie (Montreal: J. Lovell, 1865)
- Nicaragua: War of the Filibusters (Richmond: B. F. Johnson Publishing Co., 1896)

Legal offices
Preceded by Thomas C. Green	Justice for the Supreme Court of Appeals of West Virginia; 1889–1892	Succeeded by Marmaduke H. Dent
