= Virginia Secession Convention of 1861 =

Secession of US state from the nation

John Janney 1861 Richmond Presiding officer

The Virginia Secession Convention of 1861 was called in the state capital of Richmond to determine whether Virginia would secede from the United States, govern the state during a state of emergency, and write a new Constitution for Virginia, which was subsequently voted down in a referendum under the Confederate Government.

== Background and composition ==
Abraham Lincoln's presidential election reflected the nation's sectional divide. Before his inauguration, Secessionist assembly majorities in the Deep South states resolved to secede from the United States and form the Confederate States of America if Lincoln won the election. Virginia was deeply divided over whether to join them, as were the eight states in the Upper South.

In January 1861, the Virginia Assembly called a special convention for the sole purpose of considering secession from the United States. Following an election on February 4, 1861, the counties and cities returned a convention of delegates amounting to about one-third for secession and two-thirds Unionist. But the Unionists were divided between those labeled Conditional Unionists who would favor Virginia in the Union only if Lincoln made no move at coercion. Those who would then be called Unconditional Unionists were unwavering in their loyalty to the constitutional government of the United States.

The divisions in Virginia were apparent throughout the Southern United States in the campaigning for the 1860 election for U.S. President. Secessionists walked out of the national Democratic Party convention in Charleston and then again in Baltimore, Maryland. Those leaving Baltimore reconvened in Richmond to nominate a Southern Democrat, John C. Breckinridge. Having divided the once majority Congressional party, Breckinridge won Electoral College votes in seven Deep South states. With the addition of Arkansas, Delaware, Maryland, and North Carolina narrowly with 51.5%, Breckinridge won 72 Electoral College votes. (Note: Among the 33 states in the Union, the Deep South states were South Carolina, Georgia, Florida, Alabama, Mississippi, Louisiana, and Texas.)

Secessionists in the South were variously both majorities and minorities in their state legislatures. They were influenced by the late political philosopher and South Carolinian U.S. Senator John C. Calhoun, who believed that the South had the right as a "section" of states, to require a "concurrent majority" between themselves and the national majority to choose a U.S. president. Without a majority of Southern Electoral College votes, they believed themselves competent to nullify a constitutional election. If not constitutionally yet, then as a matter of fairness and in defense of their slave-based civilization when faced with a Republican (Whig) presidency with Abolitionist political allies.

Within the 1860 South, there were sixteen states, those memorialized on the Secessionist banner above the Charleston, South Carolina Secessionist Convention. (Note: The 1860, Antebellum South comprised those states maintaining racial hereditary slavery in perpetuity. They generally lay south of Mason–Dixon line and the Ohio River. The Border States were Delaware (sometimes included as "North" by its colonial roots in Pennsylvania), Maryland, Virginia, Kentucky, and Missouri. The Middle South was North Carolina, Tennessee, and Arkansas. The Deep South was South Carolina, Georgia, Florida, Alabama, Mississippi, Louisiana, Arkansas, and Texas.)

The Constitutional Unionist candidate was slaveholder John Bell, the former Whig U.S. Senator from Tennessee. (Note: John Bell was one of the older Whig generation who grew up with Henry Clay in Congress. They would later attend the 1861 Washington Peace Conference promoted in Virginia's Richmond Convention. Newspapers North and South described them as the "Old Men Convention".) He won three southern states with 39 Electoral College votes from Virginia, Kentucky, and Tennessee. The Unionist Northern Democrat Stephen A. Douglas, a sitting U.S. Senator from Illinois, carried two states. He carried only one from the South, Missouri, with 9 Electoral College votes. Douglas was the only candidate to campaign in person in both sections of the country. He had staked out a position for armed resistance to secession in the campaign's final days at his "Norfolk (Virginia) Doctrine". It was repeated on the stump in North Carolina and telegraphed across the country to every major newspaper.

In the November 1860 South, Union sentiment was a majority in seven states, with over 50% for Bell and Douglas combined. They included Missouri at 70.8%, Kentucky at 62.7%, Tennessee at 55.4%, Louisiana at 55.1%, Virginia at 54.3%, Maryland at 51.5%, Georgia at 51.2%, and two others, North Carolina narrowly under at 49.5%, and Arkansas at 46.9%. The divided South gave the secessionists pause in Congress. Despite an uncovered plot to assassinate Lincoln on his way to Washington, on the appointed day, a joint session of Congress chaired by Vice President John C. Breckinridge, with Southern state delegations present, certified the Electoral College vote choosing Abraham Lincoln. Lincoln was duly inaugurated under an armed guard commanded by Virginian General Winfield Scott but without the expected violence.

== Meeting and debate ==
The convention met from February 3 – December 6, 1861, and elected John Janney its presiding officer. The majority initially voted to remain in the Union but stayed in session awaiting events. Conditional Unionists objected to Lincoln's call for state quotas to suppress the rebellion and switched from their earlier Unionist vote to secession on April 17. At the outset of the convention, the Confederate Congress sent three commissioners to address the convened delegates in the first week of the meeting. Fulton Anderson, a commissioner from Mississippi, warned that the Republican Party, now in control of the United States government, intended "the ultimate extinction of slavery and the degradation of the Southern people." Henry Lewis Benning, commissioner from Georgia, explained that Georgia had seceded because "a separation from the North was the only thing that could prevent the abolition of her slavery." The Virginia-born John Smith Preston, commissioner from South Carolina, insisted that when the North voted for Lincoln, it decreed annihilation of white Southerners, who must act in self-defense, and Virginia should lead the Southern host in an independent Confederacy. His speech brought the convention to a standing ovation, but only a third of the delegates were for immediate secession. The Conditional Unionists awaited some overt act of aggression from Lincoln before deciding to secede.

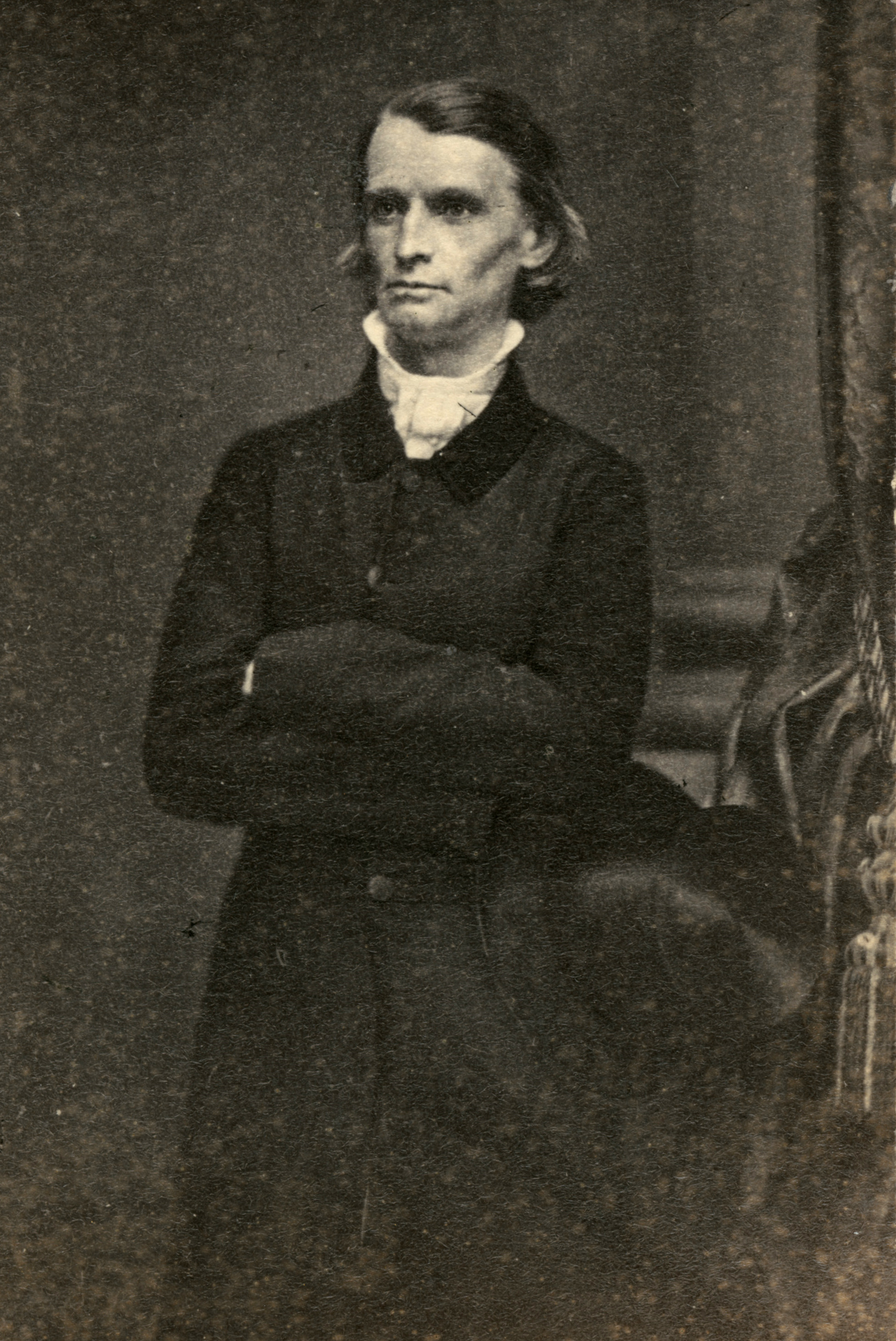
Henry A. Wise
Fire-eater Secessionist

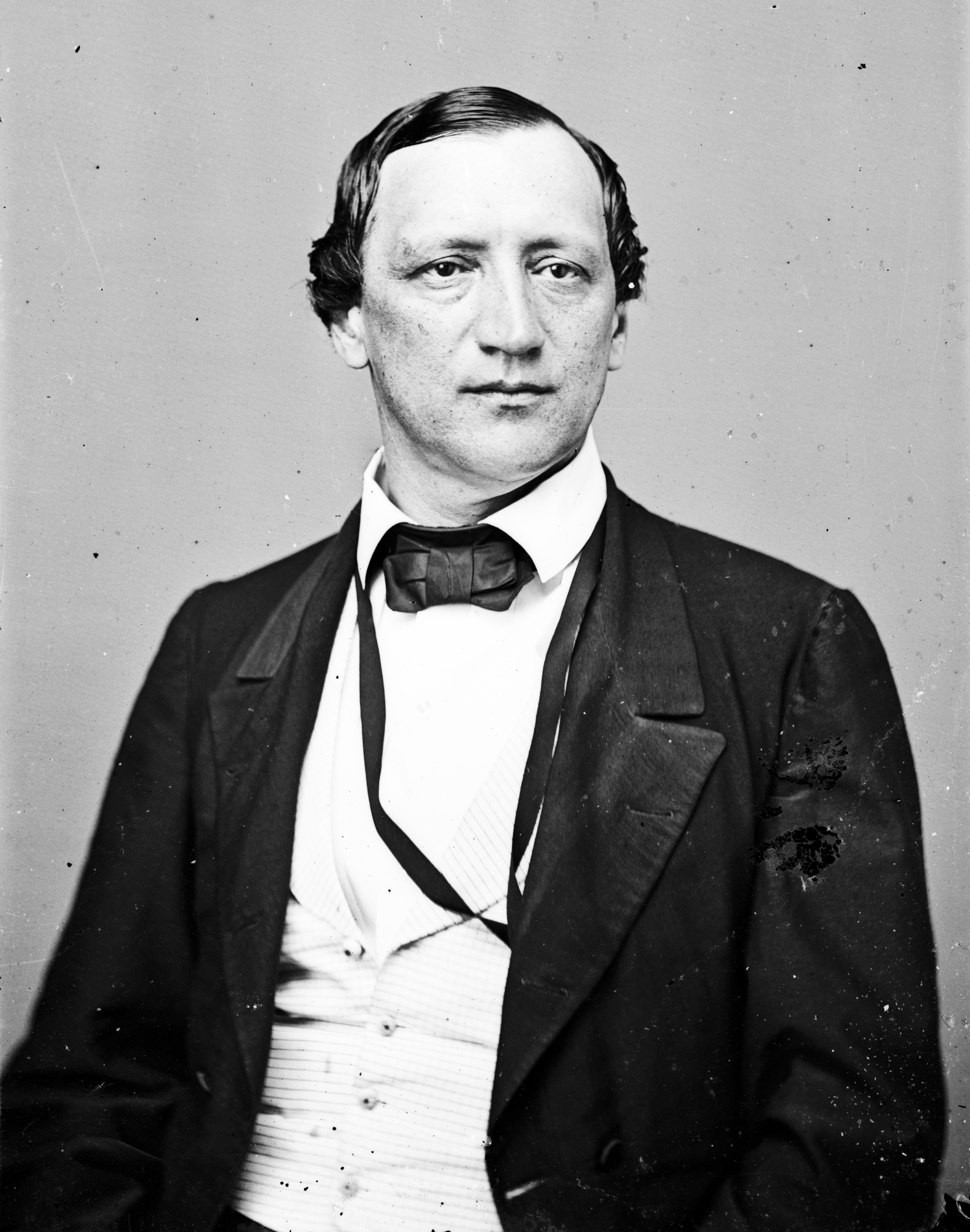
John S. Carlile
Unconditional Unionist

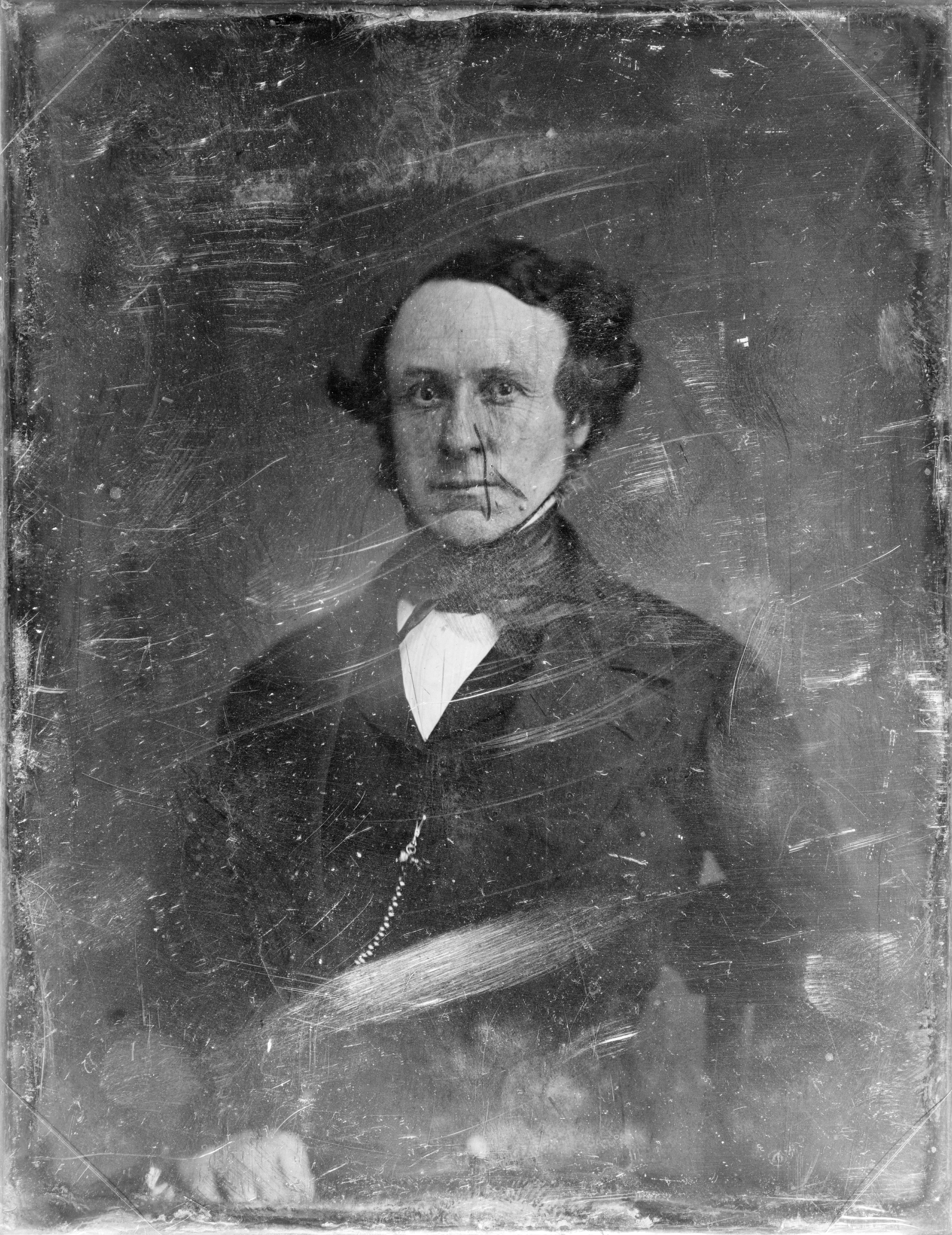
William B. Preston
Conditional Unionist then for secession

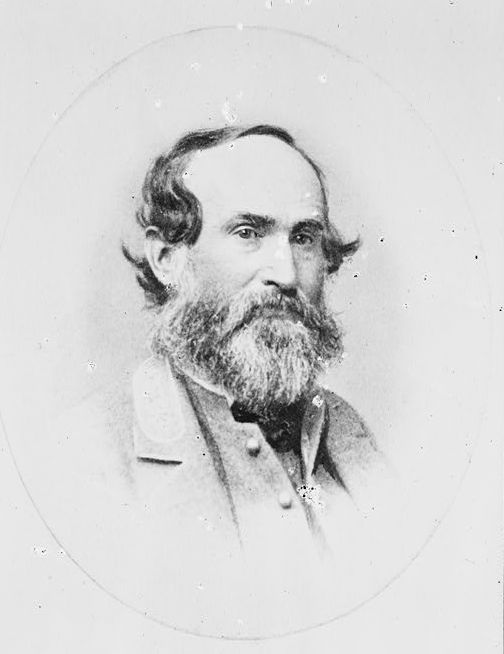
Jubal Early
Unionist against invasion north or south

At first, the speeches were mixed between Secessionists advocating leaving the Union, Conditional Unionists holding onto the patriotism of earlier times, and Unconditional Unionists insisting that secession was bad policy and unlawful. In the second week of the convention debate on February 28, Jeremiah Morton of the Piedmont's Orange County made an early speech for secession. The abolitionists' fanaticism was "inculcated in the Northern mind and ingrained in the Northern heart, so that you may make any compromise you please, and still, until you can unlearn and unteach the people, we shall find no peace…for thirty years they have been warring upon the fifteen States of the South." He questioned whether slavery could be safe with Black Republicans taking over all branches of the Federal Government. The Union was already dissolved, and Virginia would surely go with her Southern brethren. If the Confederacy "give us the post of danger, they will also give us the post of honor. They want our statesmen; they want our military; they want the material arm of Virginia to sustain ourselves and them in the great struggles [before us]."

On March 4, Abraham Lincoln's inauguration day, Jefferson Davis called up 100,000 militia to serve a year and sent besieging troops to surround Fort Sumter in South Carolina and Fort Pickens in Florida. In his inaugural speech, Lincoln supported the Corwin Amendment to constitutionally guarantee Congress would not interfere with slavery in the states where it currently existed. That same day Waitman T. Willey from trans-Alleghany Monongalia County answered Morton with a Unionist speech. He defended Virginia's institutions from those seeking to abolish slavery. Still, he sought to bring Virginia's "oppressors to acknowledge those errors and to redress her grievances. ... The remedy proposed by gentlemen on the other side is secession, [But] there is no constitutional right of secession". He warned that secession would bring about war, taxes, and the abolition of slavery in Virginia. As long as Virginia stayed in the Union, the "wandering" states of the Confederacy might return to the United States.

John S. Carlile of transmontane Alleghany County, like Willey, an Unconditional Unionist, stressed that western Virginians were committed to slavery as "essential to American liberty." But he would not run away from devotion to the Union. "This government that we are called upon to destroy has never brought us anything but good. No injury has it ever inflicted on us. No act has ever been put upon the statute book of our common country, interfering with the institution of slavery in any shape, manner or form, that was not put there by and with the consent of the slave-holding States of this Union". If Virginia joined the Confederacy, the North would no longer be bound by the Constitution to stand by slavery and slave-holding states, and it would join with the British Empire to extinguish slavery everywhere. Thomas Jefferson's grandson, George Wythe Randolph, now a Richmond lawyer, made a secessionist speech, observing that although the Republicans had captured the United States Government "in strict accordance with Constitutional forms", it was merely sectional. "The Government, then…is constitutionally revolutionized, and requires a counter-revolution to restore it." But "Let [Virginia's industries] go with us into a Southern Confederacy, and receive protection from Northern industry, and they will be what they ought to be—the manufacturers and miners of a great [Southern] nation." We should go into the Confederacy, "we are told it will bring war. On the contrary it will tend to avert war…Neutrality is impossible and would be dishonorable."

Throughout March 21–23, John Brown Baldwin of the Valley's Augusta County made a Unionist speech, beginning with a defense that "African slavery, as it exists in Virginia, is a right and a good thing". But he believed that the idea that the election of someone to the Presidency could justify secession "as a direct assault upon the fundamental principles of American liberty". The three branches of government, with their Constitutional checks and balances, protect against "encroachment upon the liberties of the minority of the people or upon the rights of the States." And even with the withdrawal of Southern delegations, the remaining Republican majority passed a Constitutional Amendment for ratification prohibiting the Federal Government to interfere with slavery in the states in any respect. "...the great masses of people, leaving out the politicians and fanatics of both sections, have this day an earnest yearning for each other, and for peace and Union with each other…" Baldwin sought a conference of border states to adopt the Peace Convention recommendations that he believed would cause the Confederate states to separately return to the Union.

James Barbour of Culpeper County, Virginia was the first Unionist to break away into the secessionist camp. While "resolutely protecting slave labor", he supported encouraging manufacturing and commercial interests in Virginia. He asked what would do more to promote Virginia's growth, participation "in a hostile confederacy in which your [legislative] power will be but 11 out of 150 [with the North], or in a friendly confederacy where it will be 21 out of 89 [with the South]?" In the South was a government to join "in full working order, strong, powerful and efficient". Along with a number of secessionist speakers, former governor Henry A. Wise, the most influential delegate, tried to move the convention into a "Spontaneous Southern Rights Convention" to install a secessionist government in Virginia immediately. Still, on April 4, almost two-thirds of the convention voted against secession. A three-person delegation was sent to consult with Lincoln, who had resolved to protect Federal property in the South.

With the fall of Fort Sumter, Lincoln matched Jefferson Davis's call of 100,000 men for a year with a federal call for 75,000 for three months, including 3,500 Virginians to restore Federal property taken in the South by force. Unionists sought to delay any military action on secession that would violate Virginia's neutrality until the people's referendum approved it, as mandated in the Assembly's call to the convention. But the Unionist bloc lost its Conditional Unionist faction with the Lincoln requisition of troops. The new secessionist majority resolved the convention into a secret session on April 16. Unionists warned that precipitating secession and war would lead to Northern support of abolition and the end of slavery in Virginia. The next day, former Governor Henry Wise announced that he had set the "wheels of revolution" against the U.S. Government in motion with loyal Virginians seizing both the Harper's Ferry federal armory and the Gosport Navy Yard at Norfolk. Wise, who had participated as the second in a fatal duel in 1838 in which a U.S. Representative from Maine was killed, drew his horse pistol at the podium and waved it in the air as his speech progressed. Wise intended to persuade the recalcitrant small enslavers from the Piedmont and Valley who had previously voted to remain in the Union with his words and deeds. Most of the Convention's Conditional Unionists then joined the secessionist camp, and the resolution for Virginia to secede passed 88–55, with nine delegates not voting after the Henry Wise remonstrance.

== Outcomes ==
Capitol at Richmond, where Secession Convention met

The Virginia Secession Ordinance was to "repeal the ratification of the Constitution of the United States of America, by the State of Virginia." That Constitution had been "perverted to their injury and oppression…not only to the injury of the people of Virginia, but to the oppression of the Southern slave-holding states." Two days after the secession resolution and a month before the referendum, the Confederate flag was raised over Virginia's capitol building, a delegation was sent to vote in the Confederate Congress, state militias were activated, and a Confederate army was invited to occupy Richmond. While the ballots from Unionist counties were lost, the total referendum votes counted numbered more than that of the 1860 presidential election by including men voting viva voce aloud in Confederate army camps, approving secession by 128,884 to 32,134.

The Convention on June 29, 1861, expelled Unconditional Unionists William G. Brown and James Clark McGrew (who represented transmontane Preston County) for participating in the Wheeling Convention in May, although others had actually attended that convention (which later led to West Virginia statehood). On election day, October 24, 1861, five Preston County men in a Confederate camp in Pocahontas County elected secessionist lawyers Robert E. Cowan and Charles J. P. Cresap to replace Brown and McGrew, while voters actually in Preston County that day elected Charles Hooton and William B. Zinn (both of whom attended the May and July 1861 Wheeling Convention sessions) to represent them at the Constitutional Convention in Wheeling. Unionist George W. Summers, who had represented Kanawha County several times in the Virginia General Assembly as well as the 27th and 28th Congresses before becoming a judge, also resigned and was succeeded by Andrew Parks.

After formal secession, one of the first pieces of legislation from the convention was the creation of the Provisional Army of Virginia.

== Chart of delegates ==
The one hundred and fifty-two delegates to the Virginia Secession Convention of 1861 were elected in 1861 from House of Delegate districts. The vote for secession failed on April 4. Following Lincoln's call up of militia to retake federal property and call on Virginia to contribute, the conditional unionists voted for secession, and the resolution passed. The two votes are visualized in maps from the University of Richmond.

Convention Delegates, Richmond 1861 with votes on secession from the United States of America
District	Name	April 4	April 17	Signed ordinance?
Accomac	William H. B. Custis	against	against	yes
Albemarle	James P. Holcombe	for	for	yes
Albemarle	Valentine W. Southall	against	for	yes
Alexandria City and Alexandria County	George William Brent	against	against	yes
Alleghany and Bath	Thomas Sitlington	against	against	yes
Amelia and Nottoway	Lewis E. Harvie	for	for	yes
Amherst	Samuel M. Garland	for	for	yes
Appomattox	Lewis D. Isbell	for	for	yes
Augusta	John Brown Baldwin	absent	against	yes
Augusta	George Baylor	absent	against	yes
Augusta	Alexander H. H. Stuart	against	against	yes
Barbour	Samuel Woods	for	for	yes
Bath and Alleghany	Thomas Sitlington	against	against	yes
Bedford	William Leftwich Goggin	for	for	yes
Bedford	John Goode	for	for	yes
Berkeley	Allan C. Hammond	against	against/for	yes
Berkeley	Edmund B. Pendleton	against	against	no
Boone, Logan, Wyoming	James Lawson	for	for	yes
Botetourt, Craig	William W. Boyd	against	for	yes
Botetourt, Craig	Fleming B. Miller	absent	for	yes
Braxton, Clay, Nicholas, Webster	Benjamin W. Byrne	against	against	yes
Brooke	Campbell Tarr	against	against	no (expelled)
Brunswick	James B. Mallory	for	for	yes
Buchanan, McDowell, Tazewell	William P. Cecil	for	for	yes
Buchanan, McDowell, Tazewell	Samuel L. Graham	for	for	yes
Buckingham	William W. Forbes	absent	for	yes
Cabell	William McComas	against	against	no
Calhoun, Gilmer, Wirt	Currence B. Conrad	against	against/for	yes
Campbell, Lynchburg	Charles R. Slaughter	against	for	yes
Campbell, Lynchburg	John M. Speed	for	for	yes
Caroline	Edmund T. Morris	for	for	yes
Carroll	Fielden L. Hale	for	for	yes
Charles City, James City, New Kent	John Tyler	for	for	yes
Charlotte	Wood Bouldin	for	for	yes
Chesterfield, Manchester	James Henry Cox	for	for	yes
Clarke	Hugh M. Nelson	against	against/for	yes
Clay, Braxton, Nicholas, Webster	Benjamin W. Byrne	against	against	yes
Craig, Botetourt	William W. Boyd	against	for	yes
Craig, Botetourt	Fleming B. Miller	absent	for	yes
Culpeper	James Barbour	for	for	yes
Cumberland, Powhatan	William Campbell Scott	for	for	yes
Craig, Botetourt	James Boisseau	for	for	yes
Doddridge, Tyler	Chapman J. Stuart	against	against	no (expelled)
Elizabeth City County, Warwick, York, Williamsburg	Charles King Mallory	for	for	yes
Essex, King and Queen	Richard Henry Cox	for	for	signed by convention president
Fairfax	William H. Dulany	absent/against	against	yes
Fauquier	John Quincy Marr	against	absent/for	yes
Fauquier	Robert Eden Scott	against	for	yes
Fayette, Raleigh	Henry L. Gillespie	against	for	yes
Floyd	Hervey Deskins	against	for	yes
Fluvanna	James Magruder Strange	for	for	yes
Franklin	Jubal A. Early	against	against	yes
Franklin	Peter Saunders	absent/against	absent	yes
Frederick, Winchester	Robert Young Conrad	against	against	yes
Frederick, Winchester	James Marshall	against	against	yes
Giles	Manilius Chapman	for	for	yes
Gilmer, Calhoun, Wirt	Currence B. Conrad	against	against/for	yes
Gloucester	John Tyler Seawell	for	for	yes
Goochland	Walter Daniel Leake	for	for	yes
Grayson	William C. Parks	against	for	yes
Greenbrier	Samuel Price	against	against	yes
Green, Orange	Jeremiah Morton	for	for	yes
Greensville, Sussex	John Randolph Chambliss	for	for	yes
Halifax	James Coles Bruce	against	for	yes
Halifax	Thomas S. Flournoy	against	for	yes
Hampshire	Edward McC. Armstrong	against	against	yes
Hampshire	David Pugh	against	against	yes
Hancock	George McC. Porter	against	against	no (expelled)
Hanover	George W. Richardson	for	for	yes
Hardy	Thomas Maslin	against	absent	yes
Harrison, Clarksburg	John S. Carlile	against	against	no (expelled)
Harrison, Clarksburg	Benjamin Wilson	against	abstained	yes
Henrico	Williams C. Wickham	against	against/for	yes
Henry	Peyton Gravely	against	against	yes
Highland	George W. Hull	absent	against	yes
Isle of Wight	Robert H. Whitfield	against	for	yes
Jackson, Roane	Franklin P. Turner	for	for	yes
James City, Charles City, New Kent	John Tyler	for	for	yes
Jefferson	Alfred Madison Barbour	against	absent/for	yes
Jefferson	Logan Osburn	against	against/for	yes
Kanawha, Charleston	Spicer Patrick	against	against	no
Kanawha, Charleston	George W. Summers	against	against	no
King and Queen, Essex	Richard Henry Cox	for	for	yes
King George, Stafford	Edward Waller	against	for	yes
King William	Fendall Gregory	absent/for	for	yes
Lancaster, Northumberland	Addison Hall	against	absent/for	yes
Lee	John D. Sharp	against	against	yes
Lee	Peter Carr Johnston	against	for	yes
Lewis	Caleb Boggess	against	against	no
Logan, Boone, Wyoming	James Lawson	for	for	yes
Loudoun	John Armistead Carter	against	against	yes
Loudoun	John Janney	against	against	yes
Louisa	William Marshall Ambler	for	for	yes
Lunenburg	William J. Neblett	for	for	yes
McDowell, Buchanan, Tazewell	William P. Cecil	for	for	yes
McDowell, Buchanan, Tazewell	Samuel L. Graham	for	for	yes
Madison	Angus Rucker Blakey	for	for	yes
Marion	Ephraim Benoni Hall	against	against	no (expelled)
Marion	Alpheus F. Haymond	against	against/for	yes
Marshall	James Burley	against	against	no (expelled)
Mason	James Henry Couch	against	against	no
Mathews, Middlesex	Robert L. Montague	for	for	yes
Mecklenburg	Thomas Francis Goode	absent/against	for	yes
Mercer	Napoleon B. French	against	for	yes
Middlesex, Mathews	Robert Latane Montague	for	for	yes
Monongalia, Morgantown	Marshall Mortimore Dent	against	against	no (expelled)
Monongalia, Morgantown	Waitman Thomas Willey	against	against	no (expelled)
Monroe	Allen Taylor Caperton	against	for	yes
Monroe	John Echols	against	for	yes
Montgomery	William Ballard Preston	against	for	yes
Morgan	Johnson Orrick	against	for	yes
Nansemond	John Richardson Kilby	against	absent/for	yes
Nelson	Frederick Mortimer Cabell	absent	for	yes
New Kent, Charles City, James City	John Tyler	against	for/ for	yes
Nicholas, Braxton, Clay, Webster	Benjamin Wilson Byrne	against	against	yes
Norfolk City	George Blow	against	for	yes
Norfolk County, Portsmouth	John Gustavus Holladay	against	against	yes
Norfolk County, Portsmouth	William White	against	against	yes
Northampton	Miers W. Fisher	for	for	yes
Northumberland, Lancaster	Addison Hall	against	absent/for	yes
Nottoway, Amelia	Lewis E. Harvey	for	for	yes
Ohio, Wheeling	Sherrard Clemens	absent	against	no
Ohio, Wheeling	Chester Dorman Hubbard	against	against	no (expelled)
Orange	Jeremiah Morton	for	for	yes
Page	Peter Bock Borst	for	for	yes
Patrick	Samuel G. Staples	against	for	yes
Pendleton	Henry H. Masters	against	against	yes
Petersburg	Thomas Branch	for	for	yes
Page	Peter Bock Borst	for	for	yes
Pittsylvania, Danville	William T. Sutherlin	against	for	yes
Pittsylvania, Danville	William Marshall Tredway	against	for	yes
Pleasants, Ritchie	Cyrus Hall	against	for	yes
Pocahontas	Paul McNeel	against	absent/for	yes
Portsmouth, Norfolk County	John Gustavus Holladay	against	against	yes
Portsmouth, Norfolk County	William White	against	against	yes
Powhatan, Cumberland	William Campbell Scott	for	for	yes
Preston	William G. Brown	against	against	no (expelled)
Preston	James Clark McGrew	against	against	no (expelled)
Prince Edward	John Thruston Thorton	for	for	yes
Prince George	Timothy Rives	against	for	yes
Princess Anne	Henry Alexander Wise	for	for	yes
Prince William	Eppa Hunton	for	for	yes
Pulaski	Benjamin F. Wysor	for	for	yes
Putnam	James W. Hoge	against	against	yes
Raleigh, Fayette	Henry L. Gillespie	against	for	yes
Randolph, Tucker, Webster(p)	John N. Hughes	against	for	yes
Rappahannock	Horatio Gates Moffett	against	for	yes
Richmond City	Marmaduke Johnson	against	for	yes
Richmond City	William Hamilton Mcfarland	against	for	yes
Richmond City	George Wythe Randolph	for	for	yes
Richmond County, Westmoreland	John Critcher	against	for	yes
Ritchie, Pleasants	Cyrus Hall	against	for	yes
Roane, Jackson	Franklin P. Turner	for	for	yes
Roanoke	George Plater Tayloe	against	for	yes
Rockbridge, Lexington	James Baldwin Dorman	against	for	yes
Rockbridge, Lexington	Samuel McDowel Moore	against	against	yes
Rockingham	Samuel Augustus Coffman	against	for	yes
Rockingham	Algernon Sidney Gray	against	against/for	yes
Rockingham	John Francis Lewis	against	against	no
Russell, Wise	William Ballarde Aston	against	for	yes
Scott	Colbert C. Fugate	against	against/for	yes
Scott	Peter Carr Johnston	against	against/for	yes
Shenandoah	Raphael M. Conn	for	for	yes
Shenandoah	Samuel Crowdson Williams	for	for	yes
Smyth	James White Sheffey	for	for	yes
Southampton	John Julius Kindred	for	for	yes
Spotsylvania, Fredericksburg	John Lawrence Marye	against	for	yes
Stafford, King George	Edward Walker	against	for	yes
Surry, Prince George	Timothy Rives	against	for	yes
Sussex, Greensvile	John Randolph Chambliss	for	for	yes
Taylor	John Sinsell Burdett	against	against	no (expelled)
Tazewell, Buchanan, McDowell	William P. Cecil	for	for	yes
Tazewell, Buchanan, McDowell	Samuel L. Graham	for	for	yes
Tucker, Randolph	John N. Hughes	against	for	yes
Tyler	Chapman Johnson Stuart	against	against	no (expelled)
Upshur	George William Berlin	against	against/for	yes
Warren, Elizabeth City, York, Williamsburg	Robert H. Turner	for	for	yes
Warwick, Elizabeth City, York, Williamsburg	Charles King Mallory	for	for	yes
Washington	John Arthur Campbell	against	for	yes
Washington	Robert E. Grant	against	absent/for	yes
Wayne	Burwell Spurlock	against	against	yes
Webster, Braxton, Clay, Nicholas	Benjamin Wilson Byrne	against	for	yes
Westmoreland, Richmond	John Critcher	against	for	yes
Wetzel	Leonard Stout Hall	for	for	yes
Williamsburg, Elizabeth City, Warwick, York	Charles King Mallory	against	for	yes
Wirt, Calhoun, Gilmer	Currence B. Conrad	against	against/for	yes
Wise, Russell	William Ballarde Aston	against	for	yes
Wood	John Jay Jackson	against	against	no (expelled)
Wyoming, Boone, Logan	James Lawson	for	for	yes
Wythe	Robert Craig Kent	for	for	yes
York, Elizabeth City, Warwick and Williamsburg	Charles King Mallory	for	for	yes

== See also ==
- Virginia Conventions

== Bibliography ==
- Dabney, Virginius (1989). Virginia: the New Dominion, a history from 1607 to the present. University of Virginia Press. ISBN 9780813910154.
- Freehling, William; Simpson, Craig M. (2010). Showdown in Virginia: the 1861 Convention and the fate of the Union. University of Virginia Press. ISBN 978-0-8139-2964-4.
- Heinemann, Ronald L. (2008). Old Dominion, New Commonwealth: a history of Virginia, 1607–2007. University of Virginia Press. ISBN 978-0-8139-2769-5.
- Wallenstein, Peter (2007). Cradle of America: a history of Virginia. University Press of Kansas. ISBN 978-0-7006-1994-8.

== Further reading (most recent first) ==
- Dew, Charles B. (2016) [2001]. Apostles of Disunion: Southern Secession Commissioners and the Causes of the Civil War (15th anniversary ed.). Charlottesville, Virginia: University Press of Virginia. ISBN 978-0813939438.
- Lankford, Nelson D. (2007). Cry Havoc! The Crooked Road to Civil War, 1861. New York: Viking. ISBN 978-0670038213.
- Link, William A. (2003). Roots of Secession: Slavery and Politics in Antebellum Virginia. Chapel Hill: University of North Carolina Press. ISBN 0807827711.
- Crofts, Daniel W. (1989). Reluctant Confederates: Upper South Unionists in the Secession Crisis. Chapel Hill: University of North Carolina Press. ISBN 0807818097.
- Shanks, Henry T. (1970) [1934]. The Secession movement in Virginia : 1847–1861. New York: Da Capo Press. OCLC 633194878.
