= Virginia militia =

- A Virginia militia private (first from left) in 1774–1775
- Active: 1607–present
- Allegiance: Colony of Virginia; Commonwealth of Virginia
- Branch: Militia
- Type: Military reserve force

Commanders
- Notable commanders: James Patton; Andrew Lewis; Thomas Nelson Jr.

The Virginia militia is the militia of the Commonwealth of Virginia. It was founded in 1607 as the militia of the English colony of Virginia and was modeled after the militia system which existed in England. Historically, service in the Virginia militia was compulsory for able-bodied and free adult men capable of bearing arms and supplying themselves with equipment. The Virginia militia's primary purposes for most of its existence were to maintain order internally and defend Virginia against foreign attacks. Until 1865, it was also tasked with suppressing slave rebellions and more broadly countering resistance among enslaved Virginians. Under modern-day law, the Virginia militia consists of the Virginia National Guard, the Virginia Defense Force, and the unorganized militia.

== History ==
=== 17th century ===
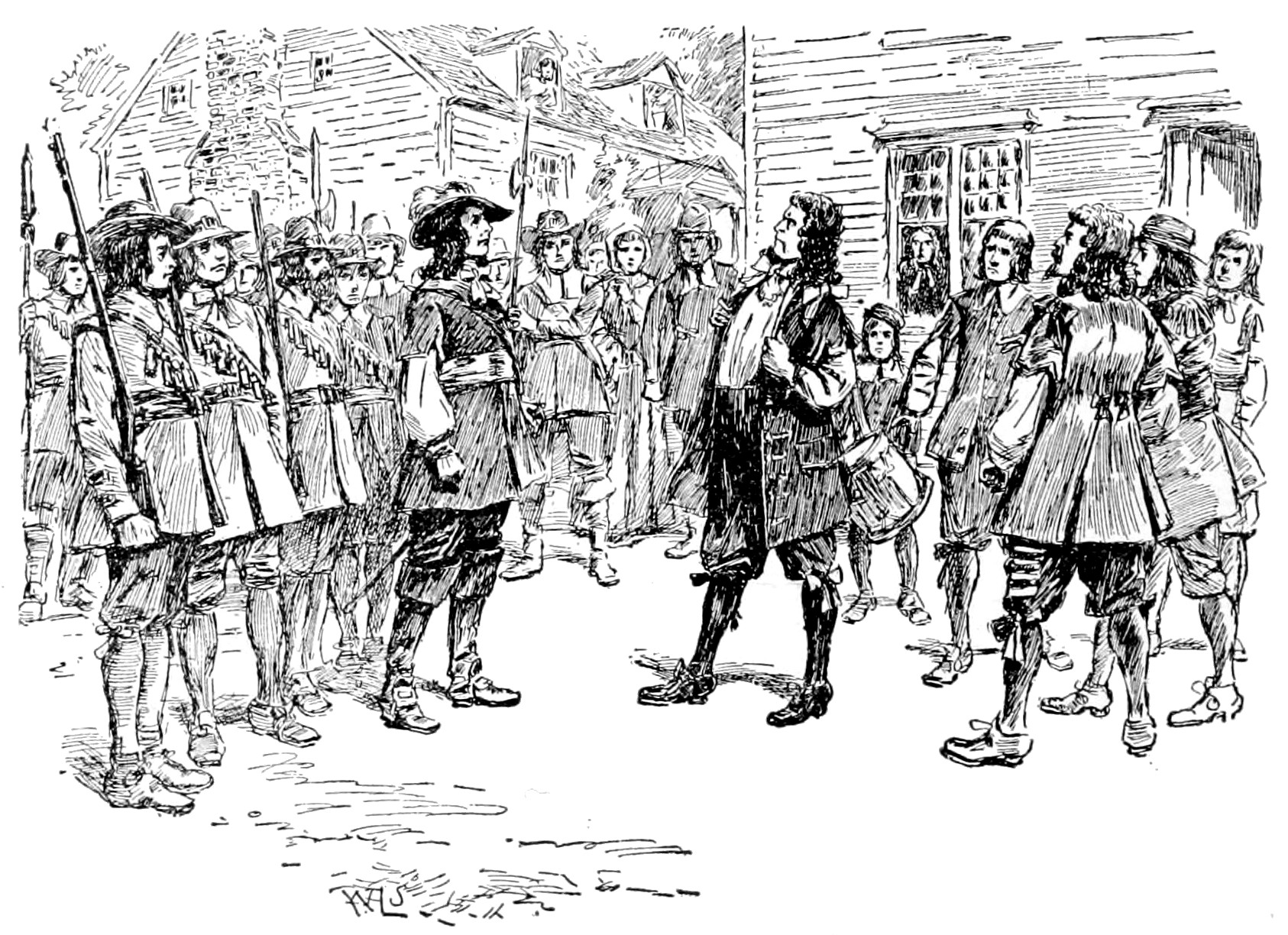
Virginia militia (left) during Bacon's Rebellion

In 1623, the year following the outbreak of the first major Anglo-Powhatan War in Virginia, the Virginia General Assembly commanded, "that men go not to work in the ground without their arms; That no man go or send abroad without a sufficient partie well armed." In 1661, Governor William Berkeley stated, "All our freemen are bound to be trained every month in their particular counties." The British county lieutenant system was employed as the population grew; each county had a lieutenant, appointed as the county's chief militia officer.

The militia system was originally used to defend against Native American tribes in the tidewater area. As the slave population grew in the Virginia Colony, the militia played a role in keeping slaves from running away or from revolting – through the use of militia patrollers. This Virginia militia system was put to the test in 1676 during Bacon's Rebellion. The Crown's militia was victorious over Nathaniel Bacon, who tried to seize power.

=== 18th century ===
Lieutenant colonel's commission in the New Kent County militia issued to Daniel Parke Custis by Governor Sir William Gooch on August 8, 1740

Virginia militia under the command of Colonel James Patton fought an Iroquois war party at the Battle of Galudoghson in December 1742, representing the first military action between Virginia soldiers and Native Americans in western Virginia.

==== French and Indian War ====
During the French and Indian War (1754–1763), a formal act came into effect:

WHEREAS it is necessary, in this time of danger, that the militia of this colony should be well regulated and disciplined...And be it further enacted, by the authority aforesaid, That every person so as aforesaid inlisted (except free mulattoes, negroes, and Indians) shall be armed in the manner following, that is to say: Every soldier shall be furnished with a firelock well fixed, a bayonet fitted to the same, a double cartouch-box, and three charges of powder, and constantly appear with the same at the time and place appointed for muster and exercise, and shall also keep at his place of abode one pound of powder and four pounds of ball, and bring the same with him into the field when he shall be required...And for the better training and exercising the militia, and rendering them more serviceable, Be it further enacted, by the authority aforesaid, That every captain shall, once in three months, and oftner if thereto required by the lieutenant or chief commanding officer in the county, muster, train, and exercise his company, and the lieutenant or other chief commanding officer in the county shall cause a general muster and exercise of all the companies within his county, to be made in the months of March or April, and September or October, yearly; and if any soldier shall, at any general or private muster, refuse to perform the command of his officer, or behave himself refractorily or mutinously, or misbehave himself at the courts martial to be held in pursuance of this act, as is herein after directed, it shall and may be lawful to and for the chief commanding officer, then present, to cause such offender to be tied neck and heels, for any time not exceeding five minutes, or inflict such corporal punishment as he shall think fit, not exceeding twenty lashes...

— An Act for the better regulating and disciplining the Militia, April 1757

Four companies of Virginia militia participated in the Sandy Creek Expedition in February 1756, however the expedition was forced to turn back due to harsh weather and lack of food.

In September 1756, Colonel George Washington was unsuccessful in raising a militia in Augusta County to attack the active Indian warriors on the Jackson River. Militia were required to man a series of strategically sited forts on the Virginia frontier.

==== American Revolutionary War ====
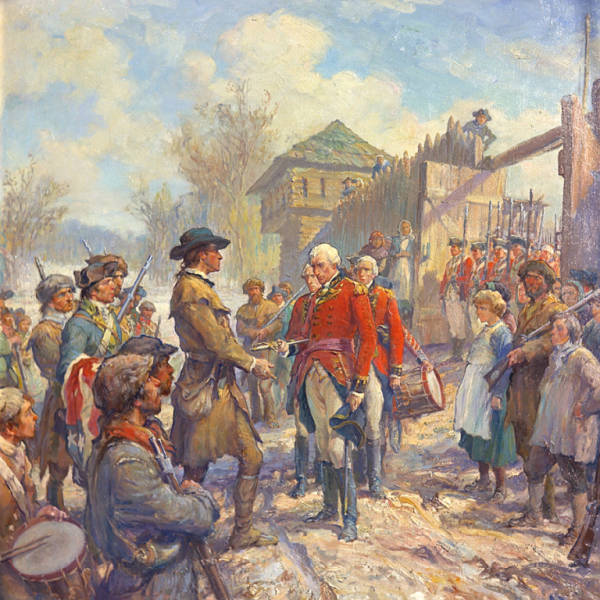
The siege of Fort Vincennes, which the Virginia militia participated in

In 1774, the American Revolution was at Virginia's doorstep when Royal Governor Lord Dunmore dissolved the Virginia House of Burgesses because of their support of the city of Boston against the closing of the Port of Boston by Lord North. On May 15, 1776, the Virginia General Assembly voted unanimously for independence and to have a declaration of rights drawn up. Colonel George Mason became the principal author of the Virginia Declaration of Rights which was published on June 12, 1776. Mason drew from his own previous writings upon his founding of the Fairfax County Independent Company of Volunteers on September 21, 1774. This company was a paramilitary organization independent of the Crown's militia. Article 13 of the Virginia Declaration of Rights which established the militia clause as a fundamental right was based upon three solid English rights: the right to revolution, the right to group self-preservation and the right to self-defense. Under Article 13 of the Virginia Declaration of Rights he wrote:

That a well regulated militia, composed of the body of the people, trained to arms, is the proper, natural, and safe defense of a free state, that standing armies, in time of peace, should be avoided as dangerous to liberty; and that in all cases the military should be under strict subordination to, and governed by, the civil power.

Shortly after the Revolutionary War began, Kentucky County, Virginia was organized with George Rogers Clark as head of its local militia. Clark asked Governor Patrick Henry for permission to lead a secret expedition to capture the nearest British posts, which were located in the Illinois country. Governor Henry commissioned Clark as a lieutenant colonel and authorized him to raise troops for the expedition. The Illinois campaign began in July 1778, when Clark and about 175 men crossed the Ohio River at Fort Massac and marched to Kaskaskia, taking it on the night of July 4. Cahokia, Vincennes, and several other villages and forts in British territory were subsequently captured without firing a shot, because most of the French-speaking and American Indian inhabitants were unwilling to take up arms on behalf of the British. To counter Clark's advance, Henry Hamilton reoccupied Vincennes with a small force. In February 1779, Clark returned to Vincennes in a surprise winter expedition and retook the town, capturing Hamilton in the process. The winter expedition was Clark's most significant military achievement.

=== 19th and 20th century ===
The Virginia militia system, as a compulsory service composed of the body of the people trained to arms as envisioned by George Mason, remained intact until the end of the American Civil War. During the Civil War, the Virginia militia was the main recruiting body for first the Provisional Army of Virginia and later the Virginia state regiments of the Confederate Army. After the Civil War, Reconstruction governments forced upon Virginia an all-volunteer militia system in opposition to Virginia's Bill of Rights. The militia became statutorily composed of the volunteer and the unorganized militia.

In 1971, the Virginia Bill of Rights under Article I, Section 13, was changed to the following by popular vote

That a well regulated militia, composed of the body of the people, trained to arms, is the proper, natural, and safe defense of a free state, therefore, the right of the people to keep and bear arms shall not be infringed; that standing armies, in time of peace, should be avoided as dangerous to liberty; and that in all cases the military should be under strict subordination to, and governed by, the civil power.

=== 21st century ===
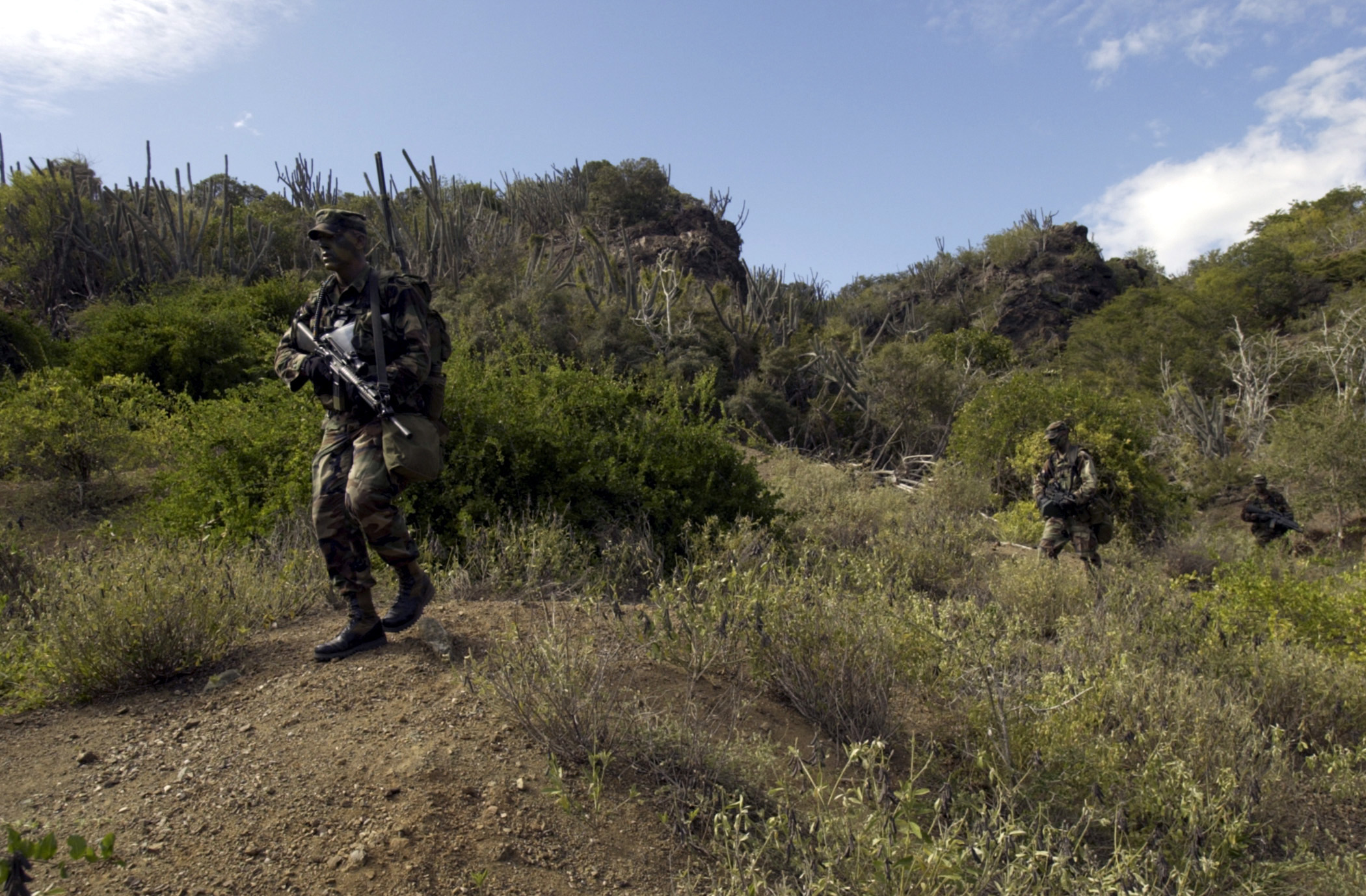
Soldiers of the Virginia Army National Guard's 116th Infantry Regiment in 2003

The current Virginia Militia under Virginia Code states

§ 44-1. Composition of militia. The militia of the Commonwealth of Virginia shall consist of all able-bodied residents of the Commonwealth who are citizens of the United States and all other able-bodied persons resident in the Commonwealth who have declared their intention to become citizens of the United States, who are at least 16 years of age and, except as hereinafter provided, not more than 55 years of age. The militia shall be divided into three classes: the National Guard, which includes the Army National Guard and the Air National Guard; the Virginia Defense Force; and the unorganized militia.

The Code of Virginia, Section 44-117 states, "The officers of the Virginia Military Institute, the Virginia Women's Institute for Leadership at Mary Baldwin College, the Fishburne Military School, the Massanutten Military Academy, and the Commandant of Cadets and Assistant Commandants of Cadets of the Virginia Polytechnic Institute and State University shall be commissioned officers of the Virginia militia, unorganized, and subject to the orders of the Governor and the same rules and regulations as to discipline provided for other commissioned officers of the military organizations of the Commonwealth."

Permanent faculty members of the Virginia Military Institute (VMI) are normally offered commissions in the naval or unorganized militia of Virginia. The Superintendent of VMI is normally a Lieutenant General of the unorganized Virginia militia unless the superintendent is a regular US military officer of higher rank. The corps of cadets also serves as cadet members of the unorganized militia. Staff members of the Virginia Tech Corps of Cadets also may hold officer appointments in the Virginia Militia, unless they hold higher rank as active or retired US military officers. All graduates of the Virginia Tech Corps of Cadets, who complete either a leadership track or ROTC education, are automatically commissioned as Second Lieutenants in the Virginia Militia.

== See also ==
- Militia
- Militia (United States)
- Virginia Regiment
- Virginia Defense Force
