= Algernon Sidney Gray =

American politician (1814–1878)

- Born: January 8, 1814; Harrisonburg, Virginia
- Died: September 29, 1878; Harrisonburg, Virginia
- Resting place: Woodbine Cemetery, Harrisonburg, Virginia
- Education: Washington and Lee University
- Spouse: Annie Henderson (1796–1871)
- Children: Annie Douglas Gray (1842–1917), Rebecca J. Gray (1847–1914), Isabella Waterman Gray
- Parent(s): Robert Gray (1781–1859) and Isabella L. Waterman (1793–1857)

Algernon Sidney Gray (8 January 1814 – 29 September 1878) was an attorney, colonel in the antebellum Virginia militia (Rockingham County), delegate to the 1861 Virginia secession convention, member of the Virginia General Assembly, U.S. Marshal, and philanthropist.

== Early life ==
Born at the family home of "Collicello" in Harrisonburg, Algernon Sidney Gray was the eldest son of Robert Gray and Isabella L. Waterman. Gray attended Washington College (now Washington and Lee University), Lexington, Virginia and opened his practice as an attorney in his hometown. His brother in law was Rev. William Henry Ruffner, son of the former president of Washington College who had resigned after controversy concerning his view that slavery was hurting development of Virginia's economy, and who would become Virginia's first superintendent of public instruction.

== American Civil War ==
As one of Rockingham County's delegates to the Virginia secession convention (John Francis Lewis and Samuel Augustus Coffman being the other delegates from Rockingham County), Gray opposed secession and was particularly remembered for a rather emotionally charged speech that brought the delegation to tears. Nonetheless, Virginia opted for secession and Gray reluctantly accepted the majority's decision. Though he took little part in advancing the cause of the Confederacy, Gray became known for supporting those who suffered and were in distress, no matter their particular sentiments. He was a member of the Board of Visitors for Washington College from 1861–1862.

== Post-war years ==
After the war, Gray, as a member of the Republican Party, served in the Virginia Senate (1865–67). Beyond the reconstruction years, Gray continued his practice as a lawyer, helped develop mineral resources in Virginia, and, in 1871, was appointed the U.S. Marshal for the Western District of Virginia.

== Death ==
Gray died on 29 September 1878, at the age of 63, and was interred in Woodbine Cemetery in Harrisonburg.
