= 48th Virginia Infantry Regiment =

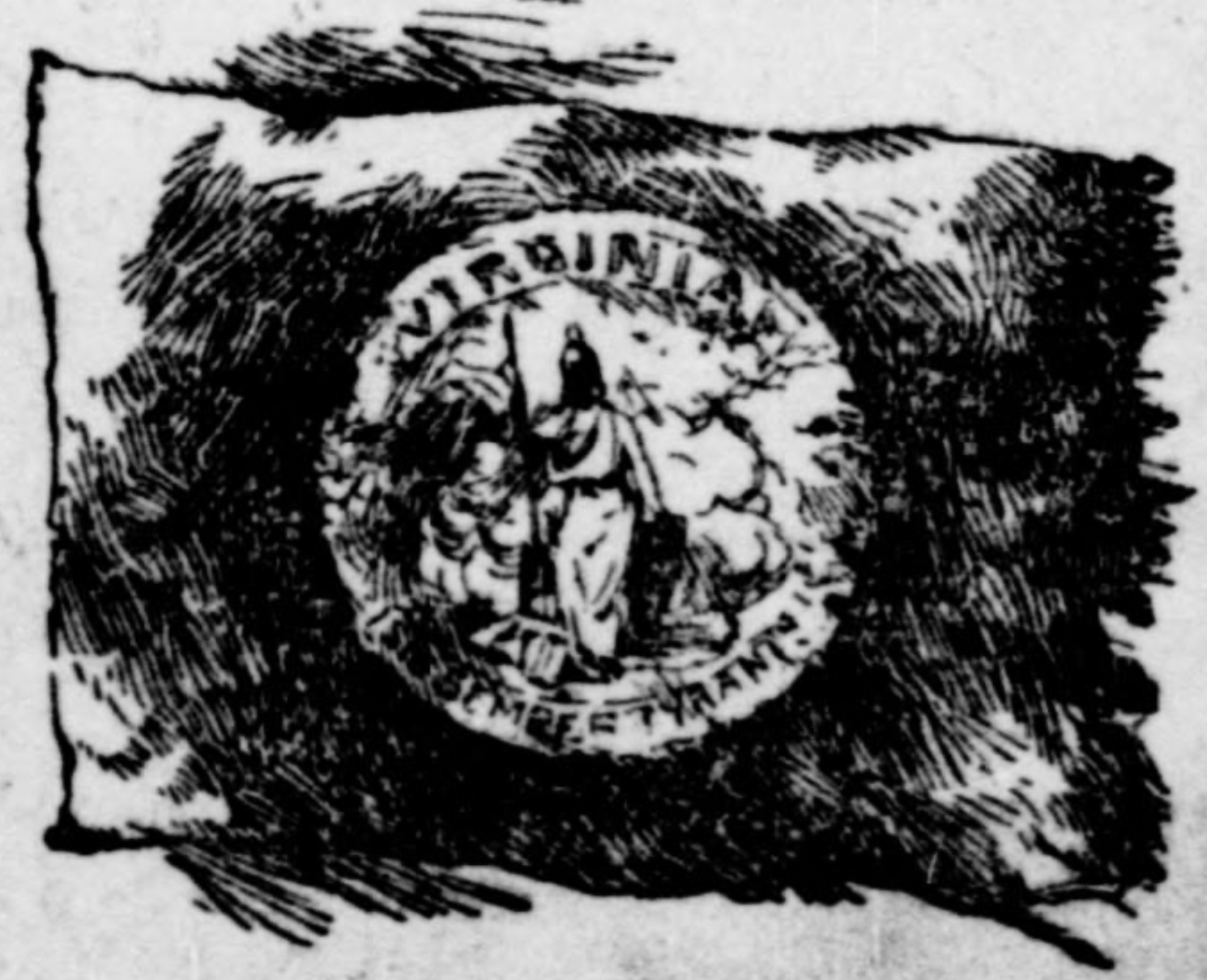
- Regimental flag
- Active: September 1861 – April 1865
- Disbanded: April 1865
- Country: Confederacy
- Allegiance: Confederate States of America
- Branch: Confederate States Army
- Type: Infantry
- Engagements: American Civil War: Jackson's Valley Campaign; Seven Days' Battles; Second Battle of Bull Run; Battle of Antietam; Battle of Fredericksburg; Battle of Chancellorsville; Battle of Gettysburg; Battle of Cold Harbor; Siege of Petersburg; Appomattox Campaign

The 48th Virginia Infantry Regiment was an infantry regiment raised in southwest Virginia for service in the Confederate States Army during the American Civil War. It fought mostly with the Army of Northern Virginia.

The 48th Virginia, organized at Big Spring near Abingdon, Washington County, Virginia in September 1861, and contained men from Scott, Washington, Smyth, Lee, and Russell counties. It fought in Jackson's Valley Campaign and later was assigned to General John R. Jones' and then William Terry's Brigade, Army of Northern Virginia.

The 48th participated in many conflicts from the Seven Days' Battles to Cold Harbor, then although undermanned after many initial troops failed to re-enlist upon expiration of their initial one-year service commitment. Nonetheless, it was involved in Early's Shenandoah Valley operations and the Appomattox Campaign.

It was organized with 912 officers and men and had a force of 800 in May, 1862. The unit reported 17 casualties at Cross Keys and Port Republic, 62 at Cedar Mountain, 24 at Second Manassas, 7 at Fredericksburg (when it was in the rear), and 103 at Chancellorsville (after which Gen. J. R. Jones ceased field service). Of the 265 troops from this unit engaged at Gettysburg, more than twenty-five percent were disabled. Only 4 officers and 38 men surrendered at Appomattox.

The field officers were Colonels John A. Campbell (who resigned in October 1862 upon John R. Jones's transfer and promotion to brigadier general despite his lack of military experience), Robert H. Dungan, and Thomas S. Garnett; Lieutenant Colonel Oscar White; and Majors James C. Campbell, Wilson Faris, and D. Boston Stewart.

== See also ==
- List of Virginia Civil War units
