= Provisional Army of Virginia =

The Provisional Army of Virginia, also known as the Provisional Army and the Volunteer Forces of Virginia and the Citizens Army of Virginia, was a military force from April to September 1861, after the state of Virginia seceded from the United States, but before the state was fully incorporated into the Confederate States of America. The force existed in tandem with the Virginia State Navy, established and operated for the same period of time.

== Formation ==
The Provisional Army of Virginia was formally created on April 23, 1861, by an act of legislation from the Virginia Secession Convention. On April 27, the Governor of Virginia John Letcher approved the legislation and also confirmed the commission of Robert E. Lee as "commander of the military and naval forces of Virginia" with the rank of major general. The Provisional Army was ordered to consist of two regiments of artillery, eight regiments of infantry, a regiment of riflemen, and a regiment of cavalry. During its short existence, however, only one battalion (the 1st Battalion Virginia Infantry - Irish Battalion), and one independent artillery company was ever formed. Joseph Selden was appointed as head of the recruiting service.

== Appointments ==
Over the next month, Governor Letcher established the officer corps of the Provisional Army of Virginia, offering appointments to various officers who had resigned their commissions from the United States Army. The most famous of these were Stonewall Jackson and JEB Stuart who were both appointed as Colonels in the Provisional Army. Jackson had actually been initially appointed a Major of Engineers, but after he protested to Letcher, stating his experience warranted a higher rank, Jackson was promoted to a Colonel of Virginia Infantry. Additional appointments included Joseph Selden who was appointed as a lieutenant colonel by Robert E. Lee in order to serve as the superintendent of recruiting.

== Disestablishment ==
On July 17, 1861, the Confederate Secretary of War LeRoy Pope Walker wrote to the Virginia Secretary of the Commonwealth George W. Munford and advised the Provisional Army to cease recruiting actions and to thereafter incorporate its soldiers into the Confederate Army. The Provisional Army of Virginia was declared formally disestablished in September 1861.

== Media depictions ==
In a scene from the film Gods and Generals the creation of the Provisional Army of Virginia is announced by John Janney and Robert E. Lee accepts command.
