= John Arthur Campbell =

American judge

Personal details
- Born: August 4, 1824 Washington County, Virginia, U.S.
- Died: June 17, 1886 (aged 62) Abingdon, Virginia, U.S.
- Resting place: Abingdon, Virginia, U.S.
- Party: Whig
- Education: Virginia Military Institute, Emory & Henry College
- Occupation: lawyer, soldier, judge

Military service
- Allegiance: Confederate States of America
- Branch/service: Confederate States Army
- Years of service: 1861-1862
- Rank: Colonel
- Unit: 48th Virginia Infantry
- Battles/wars: First Battle of Winchester

John A. Campbell (October 3, 1823 – June 17, 1886) was a Virginia lawyer, who represented Washington County at the Virginia Secession Convention of 1861, where he voted for secession and then recruited the 48th Virginia Infantry, which he led for a year before resigning and becoming a circuit judge.

== Early life and career ==
Born in October 1823 to Rhoda Trigg Campbell at Hall's Bottom, the plantation established by his grandfather and owned by his father Edward McDonald Campbell (1781–1833), the long time Commonwealth's attorney of Washington County, Virginia. He had brothers Jos. T. Campbell and Dr. E.M.Campbell. During his childhood, two of his uncles held important posts. Merchant and Whig politician David Campbell was the 27th Governor of Virginia, and served from 1837 to 1840. His brother John Campbell (1787 or 1788 – by 29 January 1867) served as treasurer of the United States from 1829 to 1839. This John Campbell was educated at Abingdon Academy and then Emory & Henry College before entering the Virginia Military Institute in Lexington, Virginia. He graduated from VMI in 1844, and then studied law for one term at the University of Virginia.

He married Mary Branch in 1848. She was the daughter of the clerk of the county court, Peter Branch, who lived with them by 1860. They had one daughter, Elizabeth Campbell, in 1850, but she did not survive to adulthood. They did own slaves. The 1866 Cohabitation Record for Washington County lists John A. Campbell of Washington County as the last owner of Jackson Dixon and Margaret Perry as well as their children William, Eliza, Emma, Lucy, Nancy, Nick and Mary; and Isaac Woods.

== Career ==
Admitted to the bar in 1846, Campbell practiced law in Nashville, Tennessee, for a short time before returning to Abingdon, Virginia. He ran for election to the Virginia House of Delegates as a Whig in 1852 but lost to John Orr.

Washington County voters did, however, overwhelmingly elect him and fellow Unionist Robert E. Grant as their delegates to the Virginia Secession Convention of 1861, defeating pro-secessionists William Y.C. White and Ben Rush Floyd. Campbell initially supported Union, but changed his vote at the end to support secession.

After Virginia's voters also ratified secession, on June 26, 1861, Campbell accepted a commission as colonel of the 48th Virginia Infantry. He served for more than a year, despite a brief furlough on account of illness (from 7July 11 to 13, 1861) and another to attend a convention in Richmond (from November 13 to December 5, 1861). Re-elected colonel on April 21, 1862, Campbell commanded a brigade in May and June and sustained hand and arm wounds at the First Battle of Winchester. He rejoined his troops on September 22 after recuperating. However, Col. Campbell resigned on October 14, 1862, because Lt.Col. John R. Jones of the 33rd Virginia Infantry "rejected by his regiment at its reorganization ... without military experience as a Brigadier General and without military distinction was appointed Brigadier General and placed in command of my brigade....Every rule of promotion was violated." The unit saw relatively little action that winter, and by March 1863 Brig.Gen. J.R. Jones was subjected to a court martial; although acquitted after a month-long trial, his service ended during the Battle of Chancellorsville the following spring.

The former circuit judge Fulkerson having died during the June 1862 siege of Richmond, Campbell was selected to fill his place and served as circuit judge in Abingdon from November, 1862 until April 1865, when federal authorities removed him from office. He was reinstated in 1867 and served until 1869 when he was replaced by Judge John W. Johnson, whose Confederate disability had been removed. Judge Campbell had also served on the Abingdon town council since 1860, as lieutenant in the Home Guard after 1863, and after the war's end, as president of the Board of Trustees of Emory & Henry College for 17 years.

== Death ==
Judge Campbell died in Abingdon on June 17, 1886.
