= Franklin P. Turner =

American lawyer (1827–1889)

Franklin Parnham Turner
- Born: April 17, 1829; Charles County, Maryland, US
- Died: January 1, 1889 (aged 59); Richmond, Virginia, US
- Burial place: Mountain View cemetery (Sharpsburg, Maryland)
- Education: Franklin and Marshall College
- Military career
- Allegiance: Confederate States of America
- Branch: Confederate States Army
- Service years: 1861–64 (CSA)
- Rank: Major
- Commands: 36th Virginia Infantry
- Conflicts: American Civil War
- Other work: Delegate to Virginia Secession Convention of 1861

Franklin Parnham Turner (February 28, 1827 – January 1, 1889) was an American lawyer who became a delegate to the Virginia Secession Convention of 1861 where he spoke and twice voted for secession. During the American Civil War Turner raised a company to fight with the Confederate States Army in the 36th Virginia Infantry and later became a staff officer.

== Early and family life ==
Born in Charles County, Maryland to Thomas Turner (1774-1836) and his wife Martha Adams Turner, Franklin Turner lost his father when he young, but received an education appropriate to his class. He graduated from Franklin and Marshall College and read law.

Turner married Frances Amelia Miller (1834-1902), daughter of War of 1812 veteran Capt. John Miller. They had six children, but most died before reaching adulthood; only Frank Van Lear Turner (1866-1939) would survive both parents.

== Career ==
By the 1850 federal census, Franklin P. Turner was a young lawyer living with his uncle, Rev. John Adams in Washington County, Maryland. A decade later, Turner had moved across the Appalachian Mountains to Jackson County, Virginia. He had married and practiced law in Ripley, the county seat, and owned 5364 in real estate and nearly as much personal property (his name does not appear on the single page slave schedule that survived).

Jackson county voters elected Turner as their delegate to the Virginia Secession Convention of 1861 where he spoke and twice voted for secession. Within a month after secession, Turner raised an infantry company in Roane County, which became Company G of the 36th Virginia Infantry (later Company E), and became its captain. However, when the company reorganized in May 1862, George Duval replaced Turner as its captain. Turner left for the capital at Richmond, and in June was assigned to the staff of Gen. Stonewall Jackson. He fought at the Battle of Antietam near his childhood home. Turner served on other staffs after Jackson's death, was promoted to the rank of major before the war's end.

After the war, Turner remained in Richmond, and practiced law there and in Sharpsburg. His firstborn son, John, who had been working as a page in the Virginia House of Delegates, was killed during the collapse of a floor of the Virginia State Capitol on April 27, 1870. Turner also assisted former CSA General Armistead Lindsay Long with preparing his biography of General Robert E. Lee in support of the Lost Cause.

== Death and legacy ==
Turner died in 1889 and is buried at Mountain View cemetery in Sharpsburg in the family plot. His wife would survive him by decades, but only Frank Van Lear Turner (1866-1939) would survive both parents.
