= Virginia Wing Civil Air Patrol =

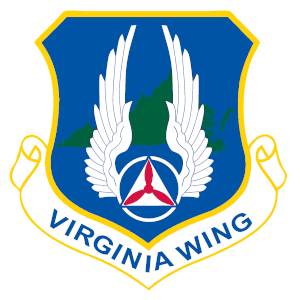
- Virginia Wing of Civil Air Patrol

Associated branches
- United States Air Force

Command staff
- Commander: Col Patrick Fulgham
- Deputy Commander: Lt Col Timothy Day
- Chief of Staff: Maj Greg Fletcher
- Deputy Chief of Staff: Lt Col Michael Girardi (MISSION SUPPORT), Lt Col Charles Beeson (MEMBER SUPPORT)

Current statistics
- Cadets: 1245
- Seniors: 1011
- Total Membership: 2256
- Awards: Air Force Organizational Excellence Award
- Website: vawg.cap.gov
- Statistics as of August 6, 2024

The Virginia Wing of the Civil Air Patrol (CAP) is the highest echelon of Civil Air Patrol in the state of Virginia. Virginia Wing headquarters are located in Richmond, Virginia. The Virginia Wing consists of over 2,000 cadets and adult members at over 22 locations across the state of Virginia.

== Mission ==
The Civil Air Patrol has three primary missions set forth by the United States Congress: emergency services, cadet programs, and aerospace education.

=== Emergency services ===
The Civil Air Patrol performs emergency services missions, including search and rescue missions. Other emergency services missions include disaster relief, reconnaissance, and counter-drug along with transportation missions, all of which are support for homeland security. CAP provides radio communications during disasters to maintain communication when commercial communications infrastructure is nonfunctional.

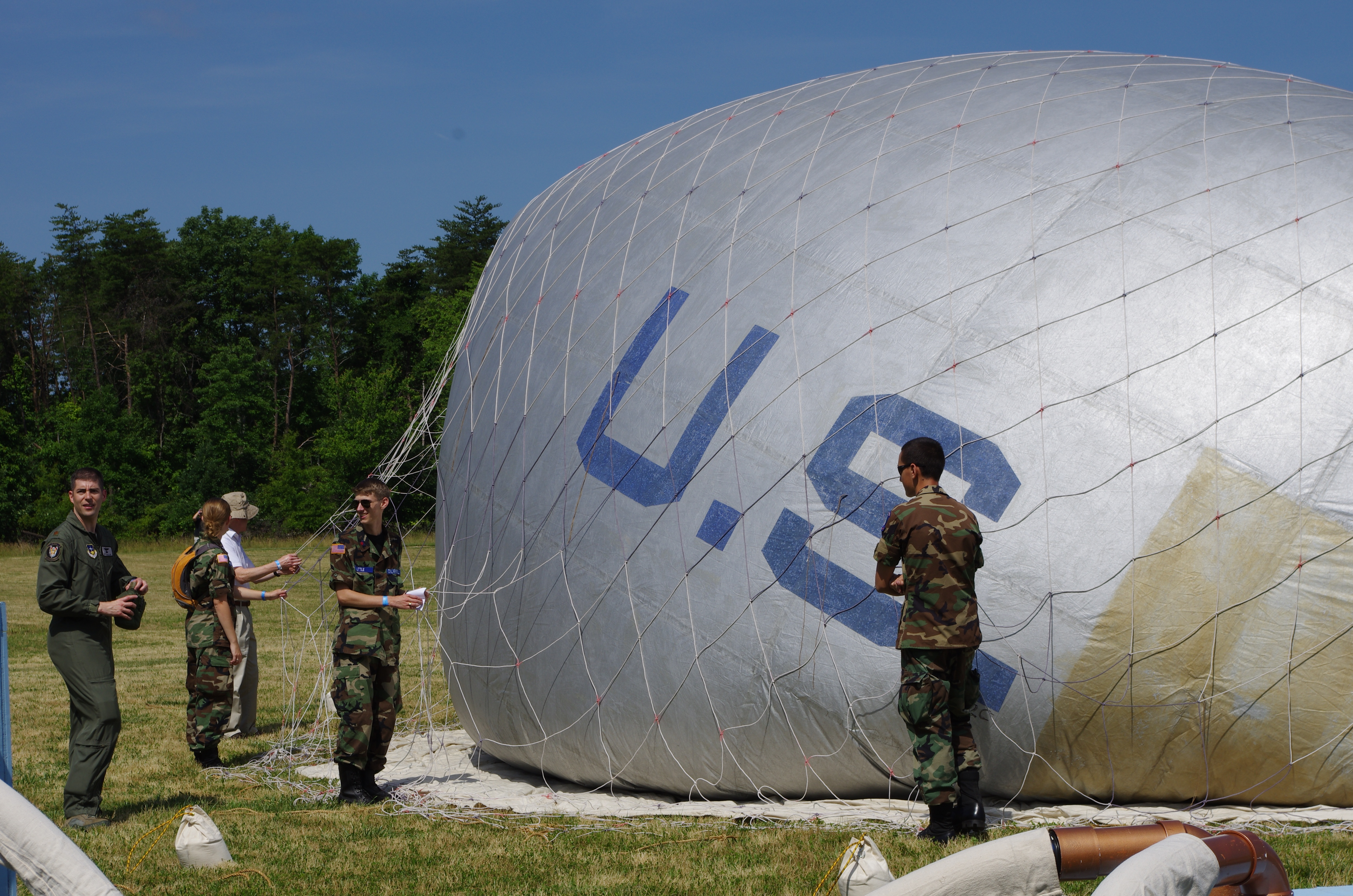
Maj. Nathan McClure, an Air Force Fellow, guides his team of Civil Air Patrol cadets in the inflation of a Civil-War era balloon near Chantilly, Va.

In May 2020, the Virginia Wing began assisting the Virginia National Guard in its response to the 2020 coronavirus pandemic by transporting coronavirus tests to and from the Eastern Shore.

=== Cadet programs ===
CAP offers cadet programs for youth aged 12 to 21, which includes aerospace education, leadership training, physical fitness and moral leadership.

Virginia Wing cadets take part in activities including camping trips, model rocket launches, and fundraisers. In addition, cadets are eligible to participate in statewide activities such as an encampment, a week-long immersion into cadet life, held annually at Fort Barfoot in Blackstone, VA. Cadets are also eligible to train for and participate in CAP emergency services operations. Cadets often serve as radio operators, ground team members, and mission base staff. Cadets over the age of 18 can also serve on CAP aircrews.

=== Aerospace education ===
The Civil Air Patrol provides aerospace education to the public and its own members. Public education is offered through education programs directed toward the aviation community and the public at large. Education for CAP members is an internally focused program directed primarily at cadet members as part of their training program.

== Organization ==
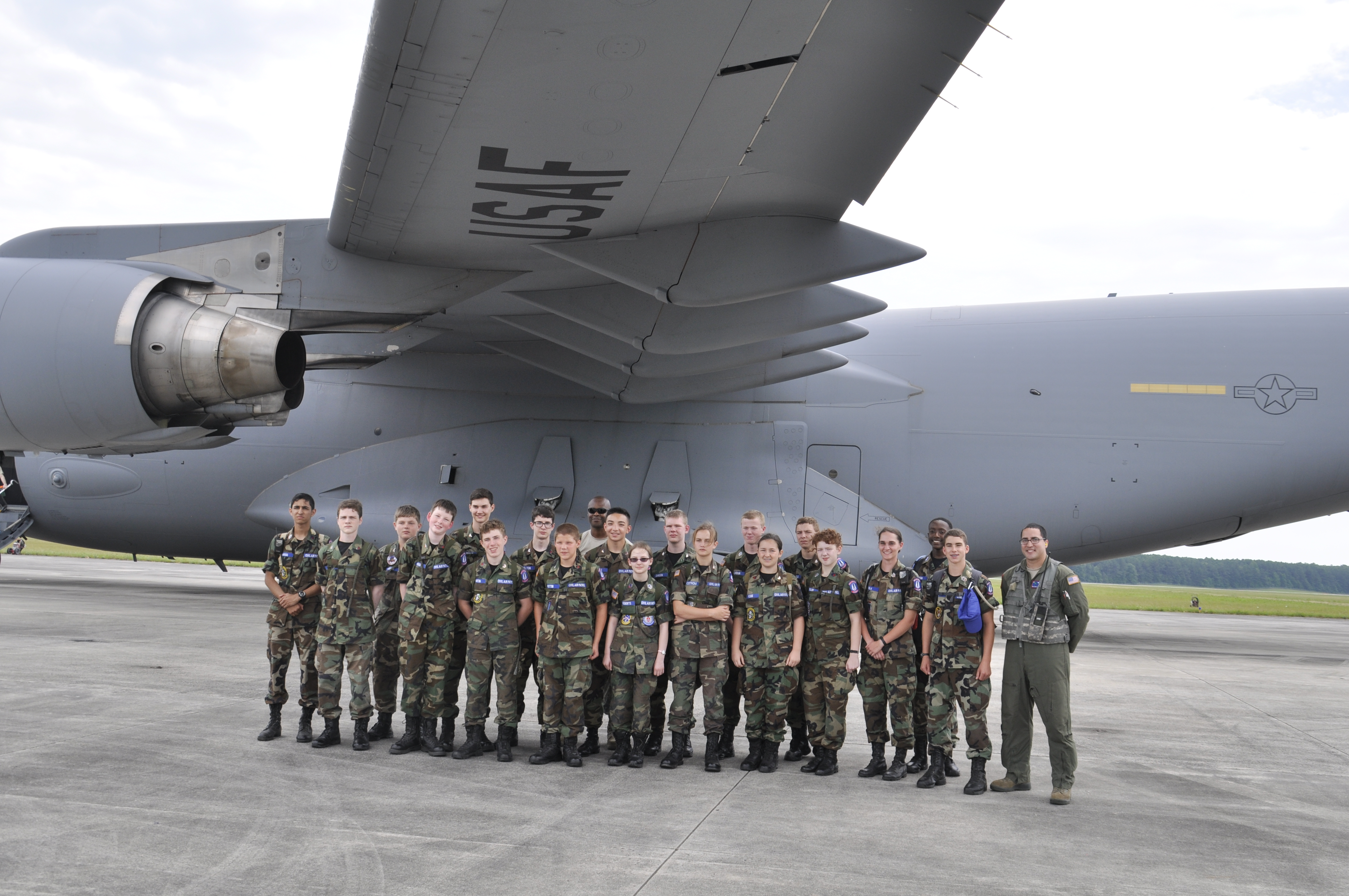
Virginia Wing, Civil Air Patrol Encampment Cadets pose with C17 after touring the aircraft with US Air Force personnel.

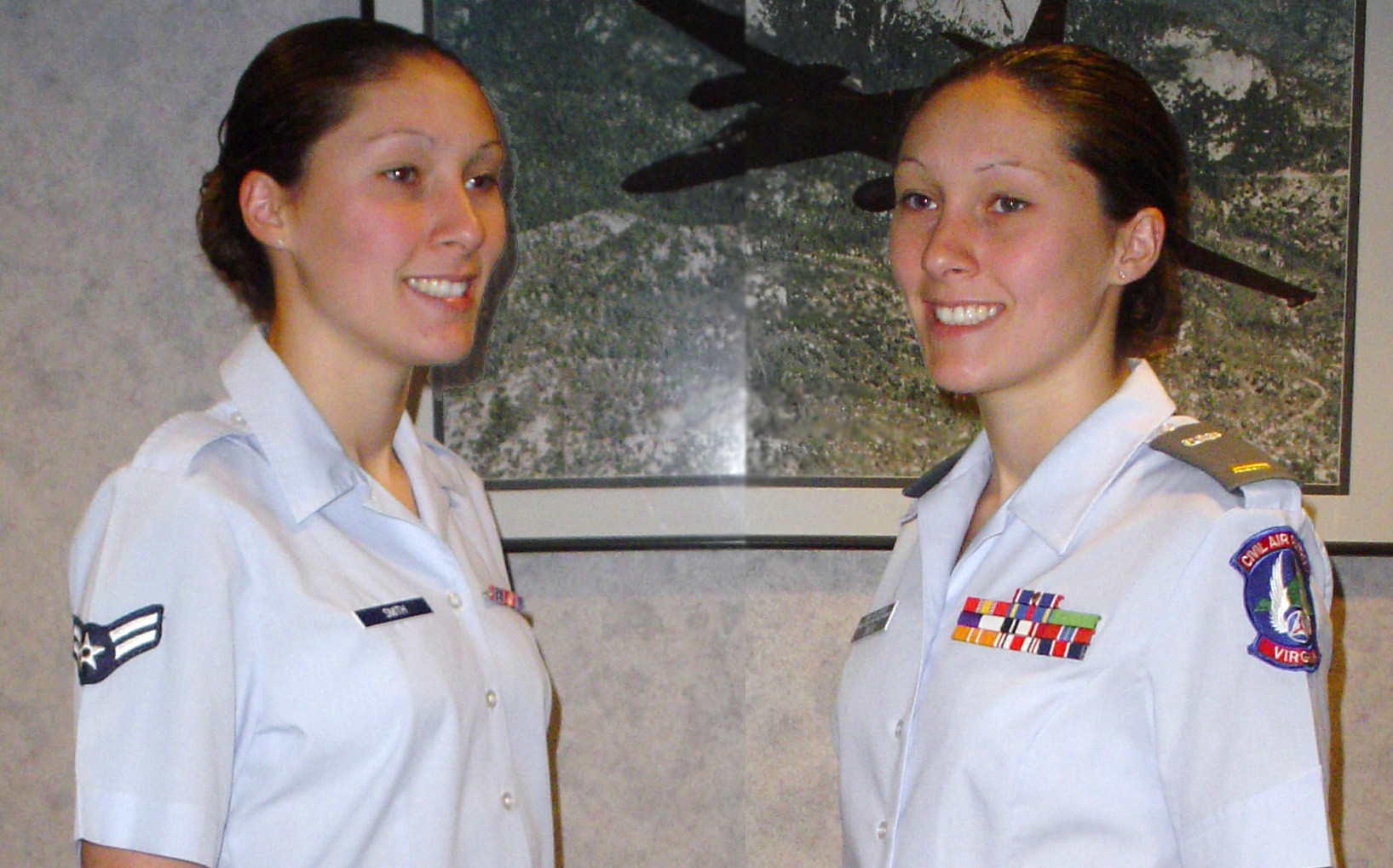
Airman 1st Class Jillian Smith wears two uniforms. As an active duty Air Force member (left) she is an Airman 1st class. In her off duty time she volunteers with the Civil Air Patrol and is a second lieutenant (right).

Squadrons of the Virginia Wing
Charter Number	Squadron Name	Location	Notes
VA-002	Augusta Composite Squadron	Bridgewater	https://vawg.cap.gov/units/augusta
VA-007	William P. Knight Composite Squadron	Herndon	https://vawg.cap.gov/units/william-p-knight
VA-017	Lynchburg Composite Squadron	Lynchburg	https://vawg.cap.gov/locations/lynchburg
VA-023	Danville Composite Squadron	Danville	https://vawg.cap.gov/units/danville
VA-025	Langley Composite Squadron	Langley Air Force Base	https://vawg.cap.gov/units/langley
VA-035	Tidewater Composite Squadron	Hampton Roads Executive Airport	
VA-040	Winchester Composite Squadron	Winchester	https://vawg.cap.gov/units/winchester
VA-048	Roanoke Composite Squadron	Roanoke	https://roanoke.cap.gov/
VA-056	Montgomery Composite Squadron	Christiansburg	https://montgomery.cap.gov/
VA-060	Southside Composite Squadron	Chesterfield	https://southside.cap.gov/
VA-088	Newport-News Composite Squadron	Newport News	https://vawg.cap.gov/units/newportnews
VA-089	Carolyn A. Guertin Cadet Squadron	Richmond	https://vawg.cap.gov/units/carolynguertin
VA-091	Monticello Composite Squadron	Charlottesville	https://vawg.cap.gov/units/monticello
VA-094	Hanover County Composite Squadron	Ashland	https://vawg.cap.gov/units/hanover
VA-095	Coastal Composite Squadron	Virginia Beach	https://vawg.cap.gov/units/coastal
VA-102	Prince William Composite Squadron	Manassas	https://vawg.cap.gov/units/princewilliam
VA-108	Fredericksburg Composite Squadron	Fredericksburg	https://vawg.cap.gov/locations/fredericksburg
VA-117	Leesburg Composite Squadron	Leesburg	https://vawg.cap.gov/units/leesburg
VA-130	Burke Composite Squadron	Springfield	https://vawg.cap.gov/units/burke
VA-135	Minuteman Composite Squadron	Culpeper	https://vawg.cap.gov/units/minuteman
VA-141	Hampton Roads Composite Squadron	Chesapeake	https://www.facebook.com/HRCS141/
VA-999	Virginia State Legislative Squadron		https://vawg.cap.gov/units/legislative

== See also ==
- Virginia Air National Guard
- Virginia Defense Force
