= Virginia Defense Force =

- Virginia Defense Force Insignia
- Active: 1607–1754 (Virginia militia); 1754–1901 (Virginia Regiment); 1917–1921 (Virginia Volunteers); 1941–1947 (Virginia State Guard); 1985–present (Virginia Defense Force)
- Country: United States
- Allegiance: Virginia
- Type: State defense force
- Role: Defense support of civil authority
- Size: 275
- Part of: Virginia Department of Military Affairs
- 1st Regiment, VDF: Richmond, Virginia, U.S.
- Engagements: French and Indian War; American Revolutionary War; War of 1812; Mexican–American War; American Civil War; Spanish–American War
- Website: vdf.virginia.gov

Commanders
- Commander in Chief: Governor Abigail Spanberger
- State military leadership: Major General James W. Ring: Adjutant General, DMA; Brigadier General (Va.) Richard Diddams; VDF Commanding General
- Command Sergeant Major: CSM (Va.) Christopher Howlett
- Notable commanders: George Washington (1754–1758); Robert E. Lee (1862–1865)

The Virginia Defense Force (VDF) is the official state defense force of Virginia, one of the three components of Virginia's state military along with the Virginia National Guard which includes the Virginia Army National Guard, the Virginia Air National Guard, and the unorganized militia. As of 2023, the VDF has approximately 275 personnel. The VDF is the descendant of the Virginia State Guard, the Virginia Regiment, and ultimately the Colonial Virginia militia of the Virginia Colony.

The Virginia Defense Force Command is headquartered at the historic Old City Hall, but drills out of the Waller Armory in Richmond, Virginia. State law allows the command to grow to as many as 7,800 troops to be activated in the VDF when necessary by a call out by the Governor. The VDF is all-volunteer unless activated to "Active Duty" status and augmented by unorganized militia draftees by the Governor of Virginia. The federal government authorizes purely state-level forces under 32 U.S.C. § 109 which provides that state forces as a whole may not be called, ordered, or drafted into the armed forces of the United States, thus preserving their separation from the National Guard. However, under the same law, individual members serving in state-level forces are not exempt from service in the armed forces by nature of serving in a state defense force. But, under 32 USC § 109(e) "A person may not become a member of a defense force if he is a member of a reserve component of the armed forces." However, officer or soldiers placed on the retired roll of the Active Army or Reserve components, are eligible, with prior approval from the Governor, to transfer their commission to a military command within that State, and continue to serve at present or higher rank.

== History ==
In 1607, the Virginia Militia was formed as a part of the English militia system to provide an organized defense against attacks and to give the Governor a body of men capable of bringing order during a disaster. The Indian massacre of 1622 took place in the Colony of Virginia, when Chief Opechancanough led the Powhatan Confederacy in a coordinated series of surprise attacks; they killed a total of 347 people, a quarter of the population of the Virginia colony. Soon after in 1623, the Governor, Sir Francis Wyatt, dictated that all men in the Virginia Militia must drill every month on their county court house green. He also appointed officers to lead the Militia for the first time. By 1676, the Virginia Militia had responded to numerous Indian raids and had served during Bacon's Rebellion.

As the 18th century evolved into a near continuous war between the British and French Empires, and due to wars with Indian tribes and French incursions to the west of the colony, The Virginia Regiment was formed by Governor Dinwiddie in 1754 out of the Virginia Militia. It was the first all professional colonial regiment ever raised in the New World and thus given status of a regular British Army regiment during the Seven Years' War. Its officers were often unpaid volunteers and they would provide a corps to serve as Aides de Camp to the Commanding Generals of the British Army as well as fighting forces. Colonel Joshua Fry was selected as the first commander and George Washington as its Lt. Colonel. Washington became its Colonel in 1755 and established the command at Winchester, Virginia. The regiment was a hybrid and included soldiers of "foote, rangers and mounted" and fought in the southern battles of the French and Indian War. Its colors were retired in 1758 and members were returned to the Virginia Militia.

As the revolutionary spirit spread across the new nation, the House of Burgesses reconstituted the Virginia Regiment and expanded it dramatically. Further, it was determined that the standard Militia unit needed to institutionalize separate mounted troops. In 1776, the State reorganized the Virginia Regiment into ten regiments of infantry called "The Virginia Line", and organized the first mounted infantry unit called the Virginia Light Horse Regiment. Colonel Theodorick Bland, a Virginia Militia officer was tasked to form, out of the Militia, this mounted regiment. In turn, it was commanded by Lt. Colonel Henry Lee III or "Light Horse Harry", father of General Robert E. Lee of the Union and Confederate Armies.

In the summer of 1776, Bland and Lee organized The Virginia Light Horse regiment. This unit was predominantly led by the aristocracy of Virginia and made up of the wealthy planters and merchants sons. The Virginia Light Horse was by November of that year brought into Continental Army service and was re-designated the 1st Continental Light Dragoons. Troops 1 & 2 were stood up outside of Boston, troops 3 & 4 were stood up in Pennsylvania, and 5th & 6th troops were assigned to the Virginia Regiment/Line as it assumed Federal military duties. Henry Lee, a Virginia militia Captain, was commissioned by Congress in 1776 to form 5th Troop. 5th Troop took over 6th Troop and evolved over the years into Lee's Legion and later into the 2nd Partisan Corps; it was the primary cavalry force in the Southern Campaign and was on active duty until its colors were retired in 1783, again at Winchester, Virginia.

In 1846, the main county units mustered for service in the Mexican War, but the requirements on the Virginia Regiment did not have them actually deploy west and they were sent back to their homes and colors cased again in 1848. These units formed the nucleus of the Virginia Divisions of the Confederacy in the Civil War; and though little activity took place during the reconstruction period, the Virginia troops again mustered for service in the Spanish–American War. These troops were incorporated in the 2nd U.S. Virginia Volunteer Cavalry and Infantry in 1898/99, but were not deployed and stood down in 1901, except the Fourth Virginia Infantry, Fourth Regiment Volunteers (Norfolk, mustered May 20, 1898) sent from the United States for service in Cuba.

During World War I, the Virginia State Volunteers (later renamed the Virginia Volunteers) were organized as a state defense force to support civil authorities from 1917 to 1921. The group guarded bridges, waterways, fuel storage areas, and public buildings and facilities during the war years, armed with surplus weapons dating back to 1876.

Due to the possibility of imminent American involvement in World War II, Governor Price ordered the establishment of the Virginia Protective Force on January 2, 1941. The force executed the stateside duties of the National Guard until disbandment in 1947.

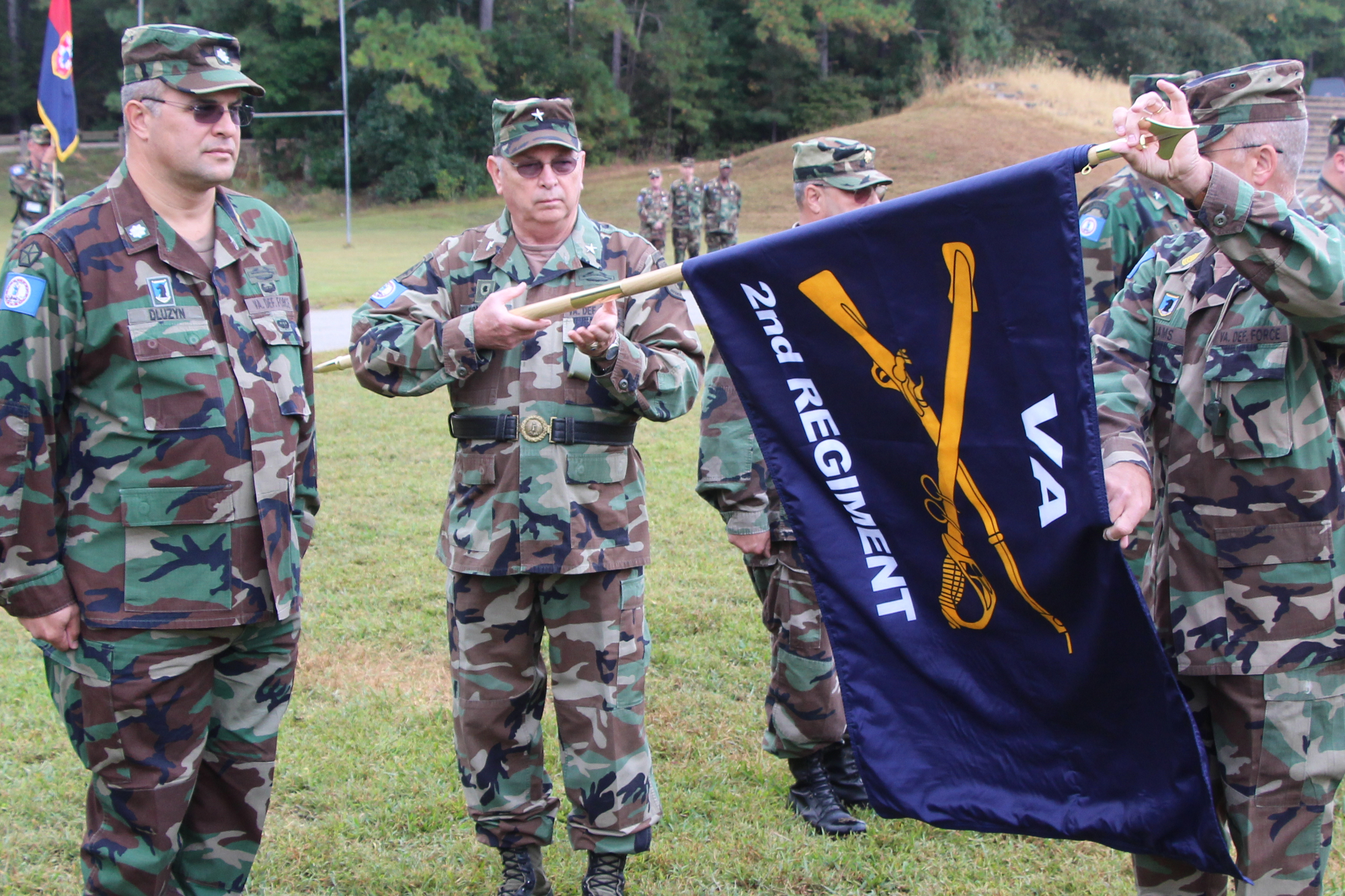
The VDF conducts a Change of Unit Designation Ceremony Sept. 28, 2013, at Fort Pickett.

Various units were activated and deactivated during the 1960s as crowd control units during the protests in Washington, D.C.

In 1983, a change in the post-Civil War Constitution of Virginia allowed the Commonwealth to permanently re-activate the Virginia Regiment pursuant to federal law under Title 32 Section 109 of the U.S. Code regarding the re-formation of state guard units. It was modernized and brought into line with the standards of the U.S. Army regulation concerning Guard and Reserve forces. The newly reorganized command was established as the Virginia Defense Force, commanded by a Major General, subordinate the Governor of Virginia, and directly assigned to the Adjutant General's forces as an element of the Virginia Department of Military Affairs.

To date, it is one of a few US military units that can claim battle participation for campaigns and wars that took place prior to the Declaration of Independence in 1776.

The Virginia Regiment (now the VDF) can also claim participation alongside such storied regiments as the 44th and 48th Infantry regiments (now Royal Anglian Regiment), and the Queen's Royal Hussars of the British Army, and the 5th Regiment de Hussards, 2d Regiment de Dragoons, and 12th Cuirassier Regiment (France) of the French Army due to the campaigns of the 18th century.

In March 2020, elements of the Virginia Defense Force were activated to assist in Virginia's COVID-19 response with medical and logistics planning.

== Mission ==
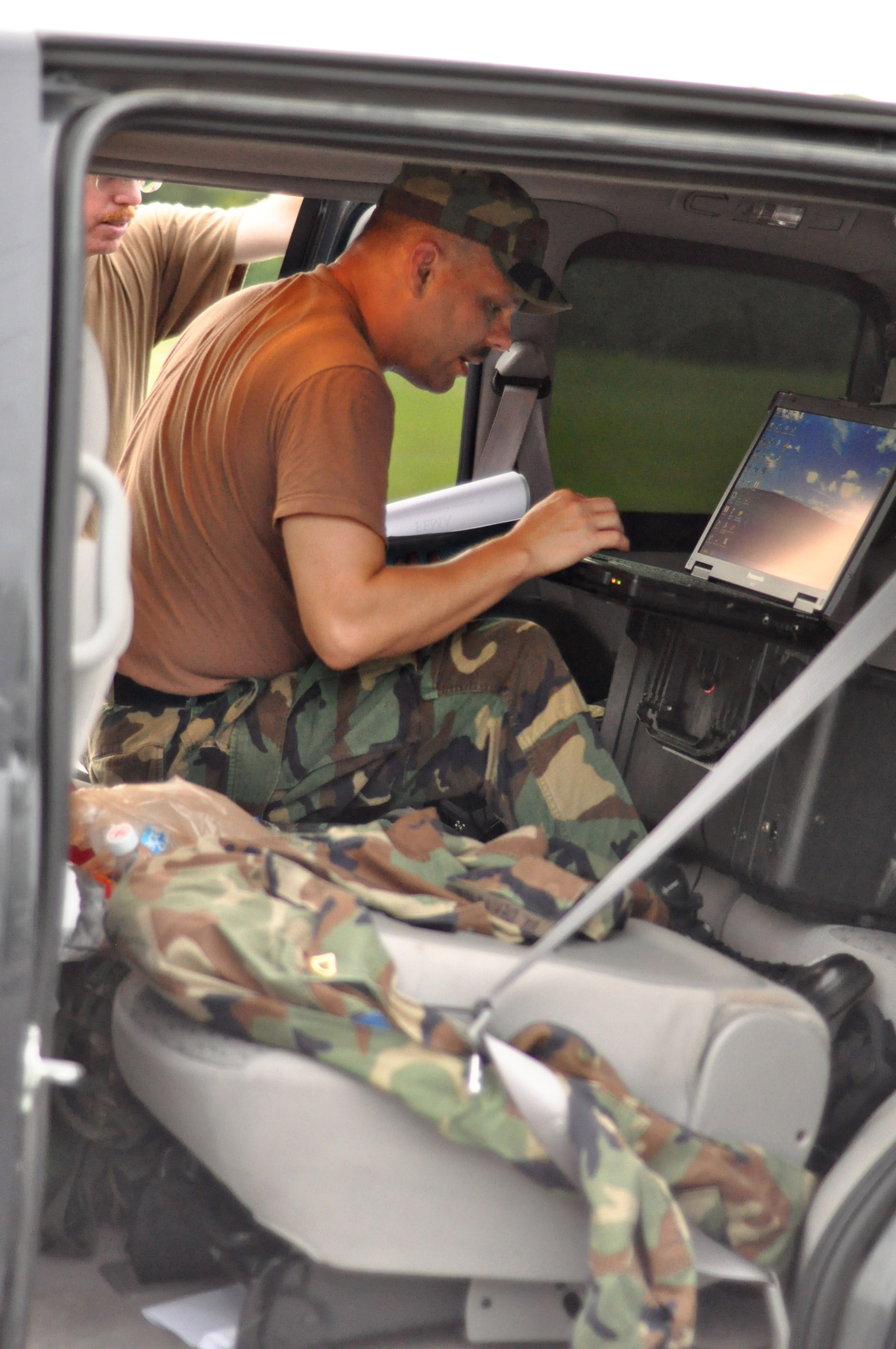
A member of the Virginia Defense Force Incident Management Assistance Team in Onancock prepares for possible duty in response to Hurricane Irene.

The mission of the VDF is by the Code of Virginia to support the Virginia National Guard at the following times

1. Provide for an adequately trained organized reserve militia to assume control of Virginia National Guard facilities and to secure any federal and state property left in place in the event of the mobilization of the Virginia National Guard.
2. Assist in the mobilization of the Virginia National Guard.
3. Support the Virginia National Guard in providing family assistance to military dependents within the Commonwealth in the event of the mobilization of the National Guard.
4. Provide a military force to respond to the call of the Governor in those circumstances described in § 44–75.1.

== Membership ==
Applicants to the VDF must meet the following eligibility requirements to obtain membership:

- Legal Resident of the United States and the Commonwealth of Virginia
- A valid Social Security number
- Age 16 to 65 (Minors require written consent of parent or legal guardian.)
- Physical ability to perform in any assigned billet
- No felony convictions
- Good moral character

== Uniforms ==
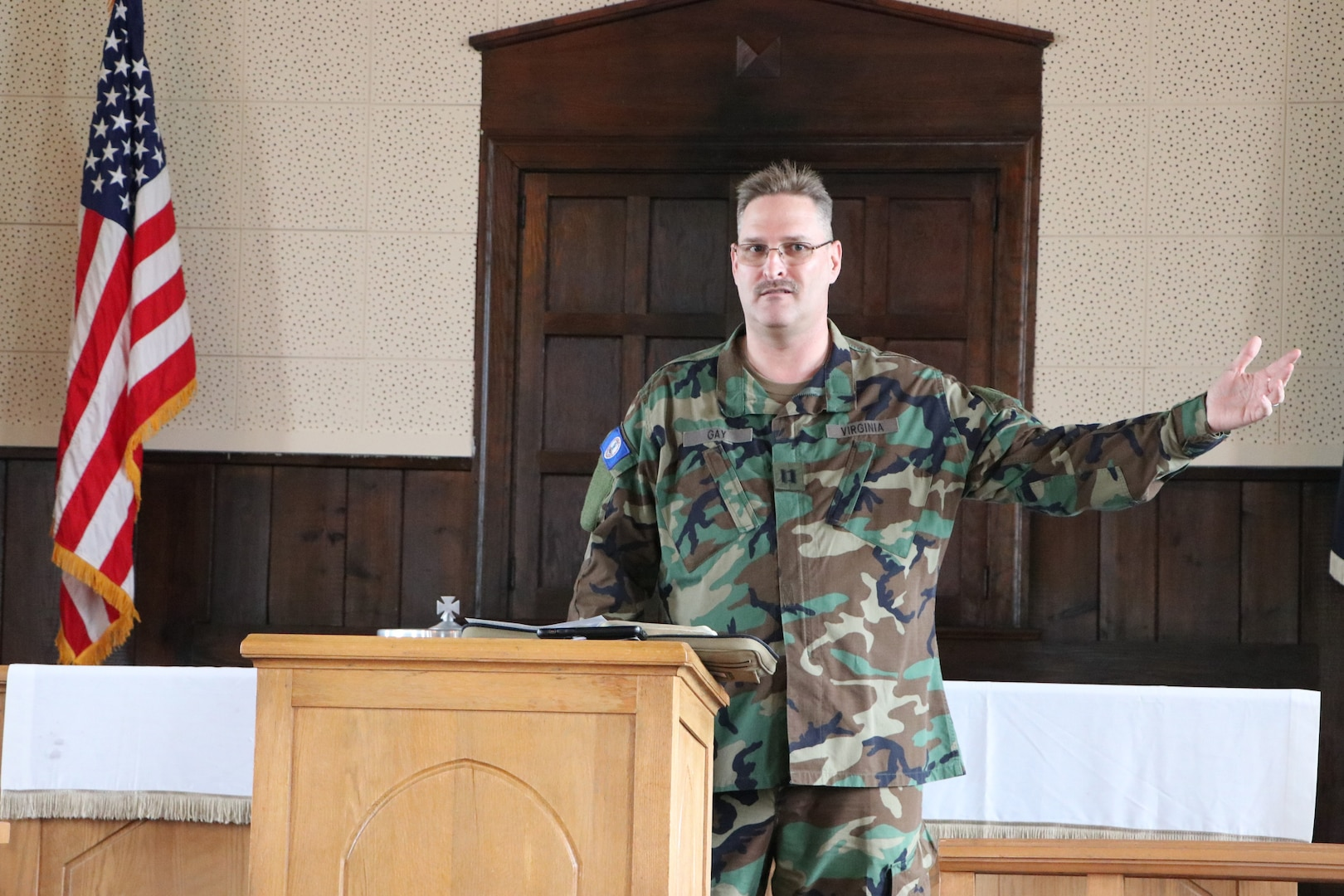
A VDF chaplain in 2021, wearing a woodland ACU.

Members of the VDF wear an "M81" woodland-camouflaged version of the Army Combat Uniform (ACU). These uniforms bear distinct insignia such as the Virginia State flag on the right shoulder, OD tapes including a "VIRGINIA" tape over the left breast pocket, and a subdued OD VDF patch on the left shoulder. OD skill rockers are authorized for wear on the left shoulder above the VDF unit patch by those who meet the criteria. Officers wear the standard "blues" uniform for dress functions and the regular Army "Mess Dress" for formal functions. The modifications for VDF dress uniforms include but are not limited to brass/gold rank insignia, the crossed saber and musket symbolizing the militia, buttons bearing the Great Seal of the Commonwealth of Virginia, and red nameplates. Prior service dress uniforms are authorized for wear for those with prior Federal service.

The VDF no longer uses the abbreviation VaDF, VA DEFENSE FORCE, or Virginia State Guard, on uniform tapes, with modern tapes reading "VIRGINIA."

== Functionality ==
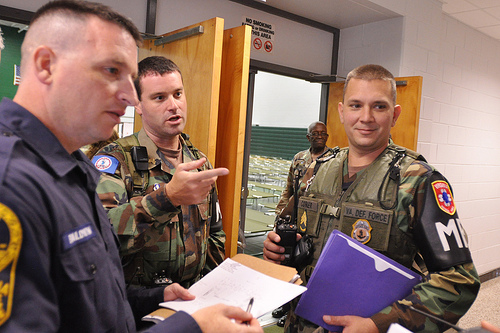
Members of the Virginia Defense Force, Shelter Augmentation Liaison Team provide assistance to the Virginia State Police during the 2011 State Managed Shelter Exercise.

The creation of a state defense force by a state is authorized by 32 USC 109 (c). Title 44–54 of the Virginia Code sets the targeted membership of the Virginia Defense Force at 1,200 members. Activation is by an executive order of the Governor in the event of an emergency; or the President if there is a declaration of a disaster area.

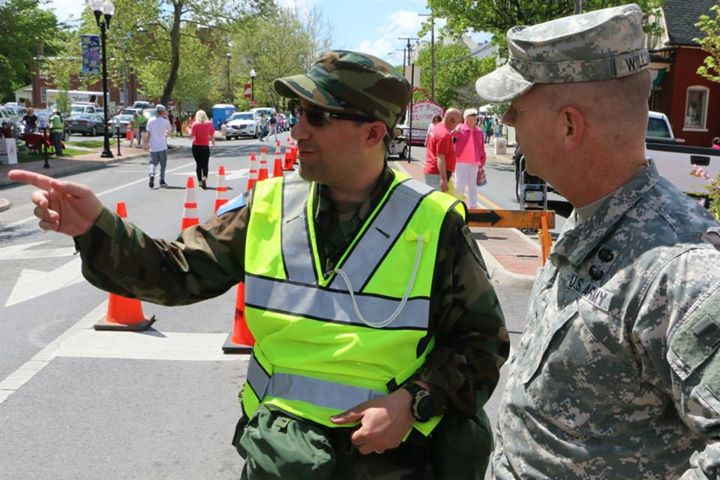
Brig. Gen. Timothy P. Williams, the Adjutant General of Virginia, speaks to a member of the Virginia Defense Force during the 2015 Apple Blossom Festival in Winchester, Virginia.

Title 44–54.12, although providing for the use of armories and other state lands for Defense Force purposes, specifically prohibits members of the Defense Force from training with firearms, without the specific instruction/authorization of the Governor.

The Defense Force is evolving into a Civil Affairs command and will provide training in military related specialties such as communication, infrastructure restoration, public shelters, traffic control, and unarmed security missions. VDF companies and battalions are self-training but conduct annual training as a division every year at Ft. Barfoot, Virginia. Many of the VDF members have conducted training with FEMA, NIMS, ICS, the United States Armed Forces, Virginia State Police, as well as meeting the requirements of SGAUS.

During the Iraq War, the VDF was tasked with securing vacated armories, maintaining equipment, and providing support to families of deployed troops.

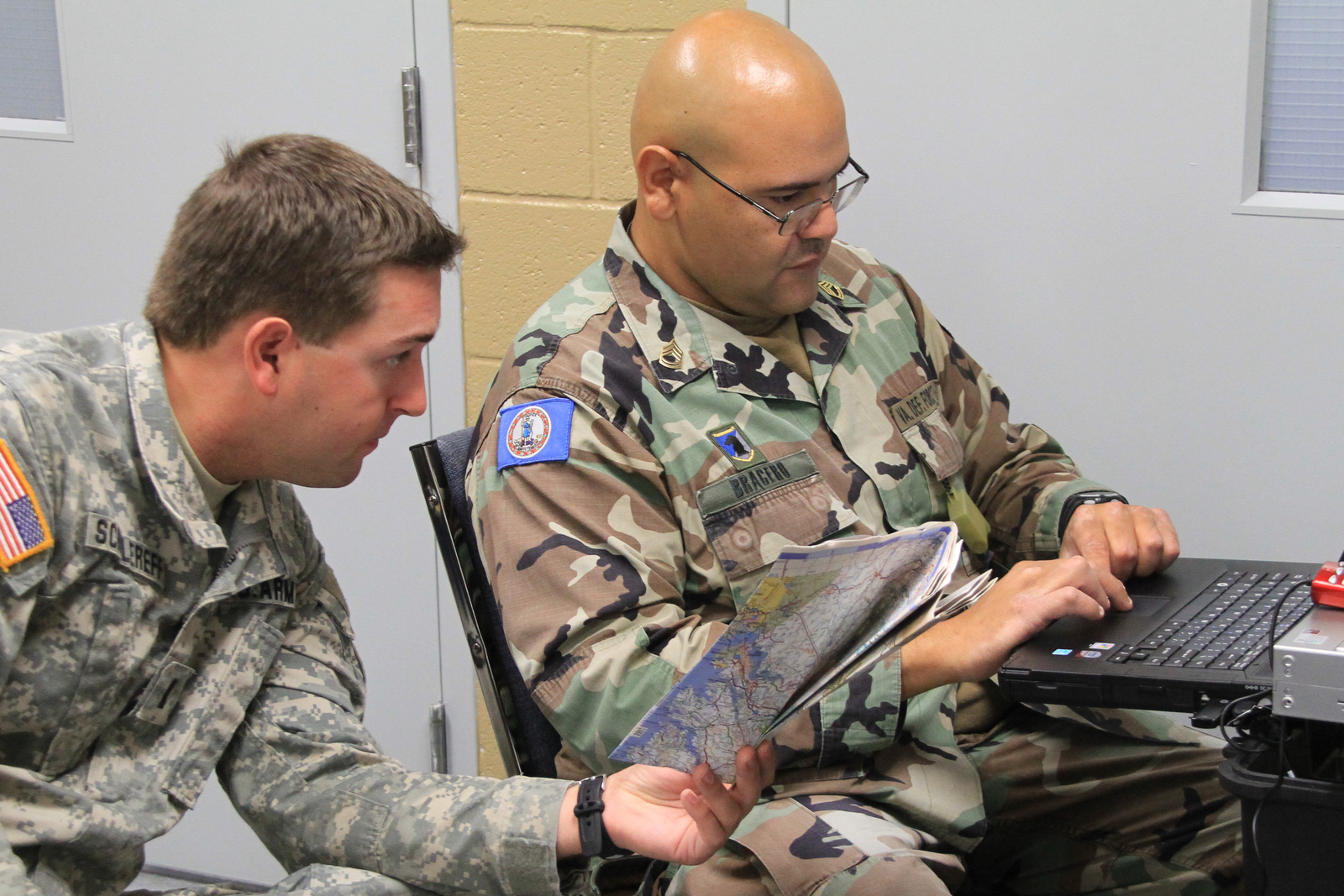
Virginia Defense Force member in 2012

The VDF maintains several Shelter Augmentation Liaison Teams (SALT), with each team consisting of three VDF members who serve as liaisons between the Virginia State Police and the Virginia National Guard in the event that the National Guard is deployed to take over shelter management from the police during a stateside emergency. During a deployment, the teams will deploy with the state police, note the practices and procedures put in place, and brief the National Guard on these procedures when the National Guard arrive so as to provide a smooth transition in the change of command.

The Virginia Military Advisory Council is the Defense Force's link to a higher authority and the staff of the Adjutant General of Virginia.

For 2011, the budget passed by the Virginia Legislature allocated to the Virginia Defense Force about $240,000.

== Reorganization and consolidation ==
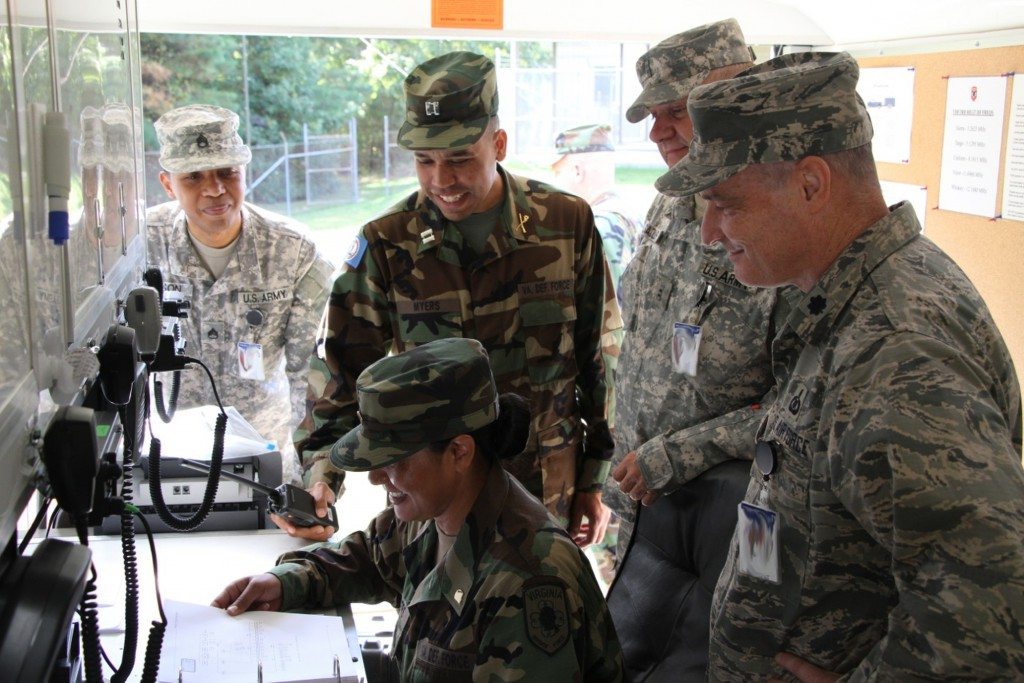
Members of the Virginia Defense Force and the Virginia National Guard operate a mobile command post to test communications capabilities.

Prior to 2014 the Virginia Defense Force command structure consisted of a single Light infantry division, the George Washington Division, with its headquarters and attached Military Police Company and Communications Battalion operating out of the Virginia National Guard Headquarters (formerly at the Dove Street Armory in Richmond, Virginia) as command and control overseeing five Regiments, each consisting of two or more companies, representing regions across the Commonwealth. After a major force-wide reorganization by the end of 2013 several units had been dissolved including the Aviation Battalion, Riverine Detachment, and Military Police Battalion. By 2015 the 5th Regiment, based out of Gate City, Virginia, was consolidated into the 4th Regiment as 'C Company' and the 3rd Regiment, based in Winchester, Virginia, was relocated to Richmond as a reserve regiment. As a result of the force-wide reorganization the Virginia Defense Force's headquarters, now termed "Force Headquarters", was moved to Waller Depot in Richmond, Virginia.

On September 29, 2019, the Virginia Defense Force consolidated its remaining four regiments into a single regiment, the 1st Regiment. In a ceremony at Ft. Barfoot, the 2nd Regiment in Manassas, the 3rd Regiment (Reserve) in Richmond, and the 4th Regiment in Lynchburg were stood down while the 1st Regiment was stood up as a single consolidated command. According to Brigadier General (VA) Justin P. Carlitti, Commanding General of the VDF, the consolidation was conducted in an effort to improve the unit's agility, morale, and reduce workloads as well as position the VDF as whole for future growth in both its mission and size.

== Units ==
VDF is designed a force multiplier for the Virginia National Guard. As of 2020 the command structure of the VDF is organized as a single regiment consisting of six line companies located in Fairfax, Warrenton, Winchester, Virginia Beach, Lynchburg, and Cedar Bluff, with each company made of platoons focused on civil support security and communications. Previously known as Force Protection units, civil support security platoons provide capabilities such as traffic management, access control, gate sentry and vehicle searches, and the communications platoons use HF radios and tactical communication packages for data and voice messaging as well as incident management.

Virginia Defense Force Units

=== Current Units (2019–present) ===
The major units of the VDF and where they are headquartered are:

- VDF Headquarters: Richmond
- 1st Regiment
  - HHC: Richmond, Virginia
  - A Company: Lynchburg, Virginia
  - B Company: Warrenton, Virginia
  - C Company: Winchester, Virginia
  - D Company: Virginia Beach, Virginia
  - E Company: Fairfax, Virginia
  - F Company: Cedar Bluff, Virginia
- Communications Battalion: Lynchburg
- 31st Cyber Battalion
  - Battalion HQ: Manassas, Virginia
  - A Company: Fairfax, Virginia
  - B Company: Richmond, Virginia

=== Former Units ===
==== VDF Aviation Battalion ====
The Virginia Defense Force maintained an aviation battalion with companies in the Hampton Roads area, Orange, and Danville. The Virginia State Guard organization of World War II also once had a "Flying Corps" of several squadrons, but these were all eventually absorbed into the Virginia Wing Civil Air Patrol (CAP). The VDF's Aviation Battalion maintained fifteen privately owned aircraft, and conducted damage assessment, aerial reconnaissance, and search and rescue missions. The Aviation Battalion assisted the DEA with counter-drug trafficking reconnaissance in rural and remote areas of Virginia. The Aviation Battalion was dissolved in the wake of the VDF's major reorganization in the fall of 2013.

==== VDF Riverine Detachment ====
The Virginia Defense Force maintained a riverine detachment which was capable of conducting inland aquatic search and rescue operations as well as transport and security operations. The Riverine Detachment was dissolved in the spring of 2013.

The RD, as an (unofficial) part of the naval militia of the state, formerly carried the traditions of the Virginia State Navy.

==== VDF Military Police ====
The Virginia Defense Force Military police operated less-than-lethal security missions. The Military Police trained in such subjects as command post security, first responder training, incident management, traffic control, crowd control, riot control, vehicle checkpoints, vehicle and personal searches, military assistance and civil disorders, baton and other skills that were necessary to ensure the safety of the personnel of the VDF and citizens of the Commonwealth. The MP Company, and subsequently MP Battalion, was a Commonwealth of Virginia Law Enforcement agency until its dissolution in a major force-wide reorganization in the fall of 2013, and some of its former personnel have been re-designated as HQ Security and Access Control Teams for their respective regiments.

==== VDF 2nd Regiment ====
The 2nd Regiment, previously headquartered in Manassas was responsible for Northern Virginia with A Company operating in Manassas and Fairfax and B Company operating in Fredericksburg and Bowling Green with a detachment in Warrenton and Culpeper.

==== VDF 3rd Regiment ====
Originally the 3rd Regiment's headquarters and A Company were based in Winchester with B Company in Leesburg and C Company in Charlottesville, the previous reorganization left the 3rd Regiment in a Reserve status and relocated to Richmond. It was stood down in a ceremony on September 29, 2019, at Ft. Pickett.

==== VDF 4th Regiment ====
The 4th Regiment, headquartered in Lynchburg with three companies garrisoned in Bedford (A Company), Lynchburg (B Company), and Gate City / Pulaski (C Company, remnants of the 5th Regiment) respectively, was stood down in a ceremony at Ft. Pickett on September 29, 2019.

==== VDF 5th Regiment ====
The Virginia Defense Force 5th Regiment, originally based out of Gate City, was de-activated in 2015, and its remaining companies, detachments, personnel, and materials were then absorbed into the 4th Regiment, where its made up the 4th Regiment's Company C.

== Legal protection ==
The Code of Virginia guarantees that members of the Virginia Defense Force who are called to active duty or training are entitled to a leave of absence, and full reemployment rights after their deployment ends. However, members employed out of state or by the Federal government do not enjoy such protections.

== Virginia Defense Force awards ==
The following ribbons and medals are awarded to members of the Virginia Defense Force:

- Life Saving Medal (LSM)
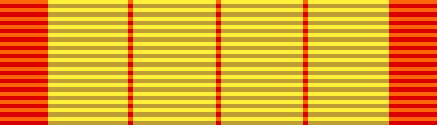
- Distinguished Service Medal (DSM)
- Meritorious Service Medal (MSM)
- Commendation Medal (CM)
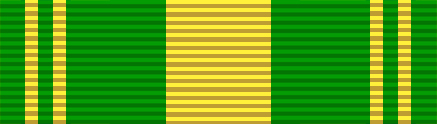
- Achievement Medal (AM)
- Active Service Ribbon (ASR)
- Service Ribbon (SR)
- Community Service Ribbon (CSR)
- Attendance Ribbon (AR)
- Response Management Staff College Completion Ribbon (obsolete)
- Operational Staff, Command, Control & Communications Course Ribbon (OSC3R) (obsolete)
- Advanced Leader Course Ribbon (ALCR) (obsolete)
- Company Leader Course Ribbon (CLCR) (obsolete)
- Noncommissioned Officer Development Ribbon (NCODR)
- Recruiting and Retention Ribbon (RRR)
- State Guard Association of the United States Longevity Ribbon (SGAUSR)
- State Guard Association of the United States Membership Ribbon (SGAUSLR)
- VDF Unit Readiness Citation (Dead Eye)

== See also ==
- State Guard Association of the United States
- Virginia Military Institute
- Virginia National Guard
- Virginia Wing Civil Air Patrol
- Virginia militia
- Virginia Regiment
