= Virginia Regiment =

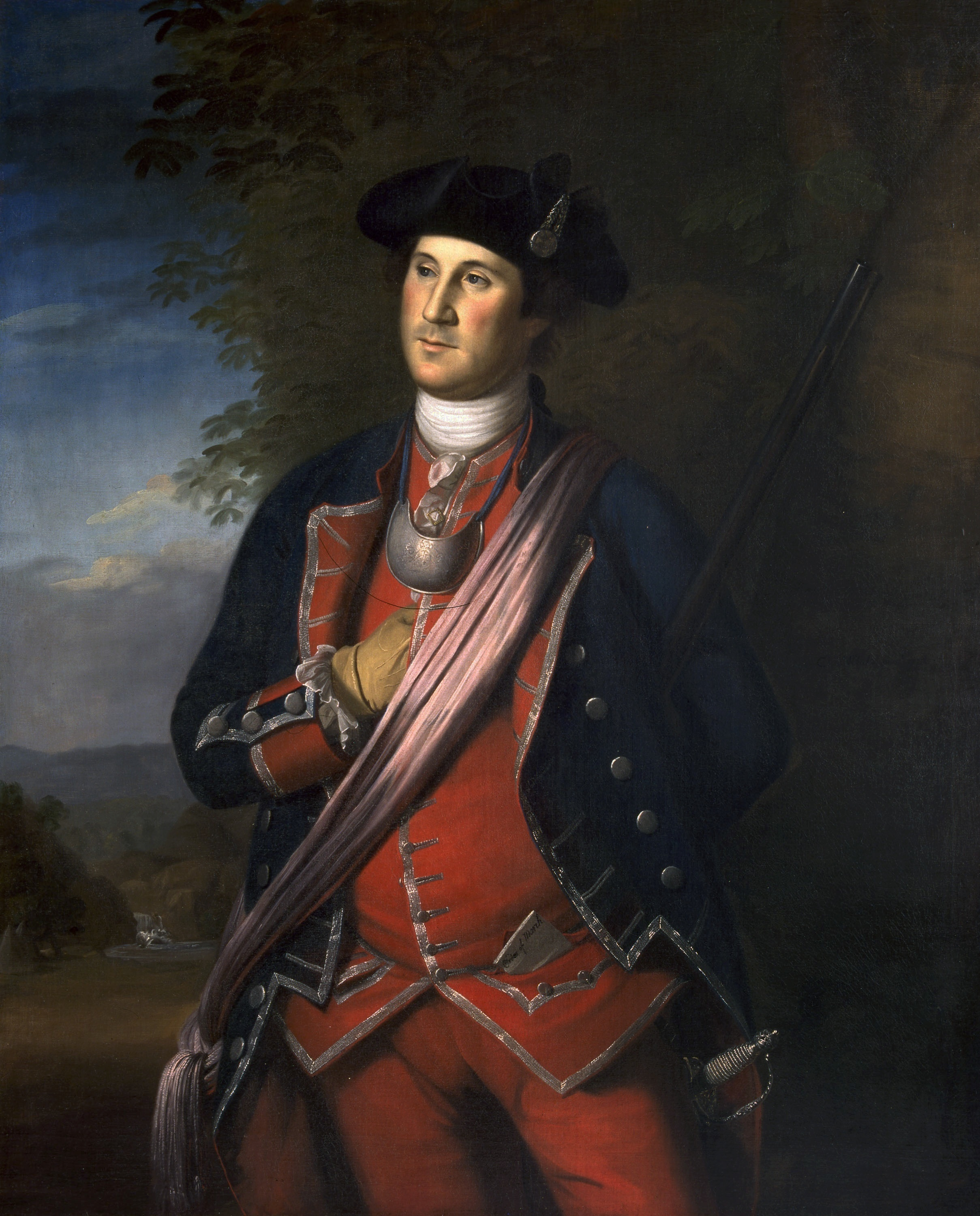
- 1772 portrait of George Washington as the regimental colonel
- Active: 1754–1763
- Allegiance: Virginia
- Branch: Virginia Provincial Forces
- Type: Infantry
- Role: Line infantry
- Engagements: French and Indian War: Battle of Jumonville Glen; Battle of Fort Necessity; Braddock expedition; Battle of the Monongahela; Forbes Expedition

Commanders
- Commander: Joshua Fry (1754); George Washington (1754–1758)

The Virginia Regiment was a line infantry regiment of the Virginia Provincial Forces raised in 1754 by the Virginia General Assembly and Governor Robert Dinwiddie for service in the French and Indian War. The only provincial regiment raised by the British colony of Virginia during the conflict, it initially consisted of about 300 men under Colonel Joshua Fry, with Lieutenant Colonel George Washington assuming command after Fry's death. The regiment fought at the battles of Jumonville Glen and Fort Necessity, after which the General Assembly voted to double its strength.

Under orders from Major-general Edward Braddock, the regiment was reorganized into six ranger companies, two carpenter companies, and one troop of mounted rangers in 1755 for service in the Braddock Expedition, which culminated in the disastrous Battle of the Monongahela. It was subsequently expanded into the First Virginia Regiment and Second Virginia Regiment for the Forbes Expedition of 1758. Following the outbreak of the Anglo-Cherokee War in 1758, the regiment remained on Virginia's frontier before being disbanded by Governor Francis Fauquier in 1763. Although Washington resigned from the regiment in 1758 after being denied an officer's commission in the British Army, his service provided valuable military experience that influenced Washington's leadership in the American Revolutionary War.

== History ==
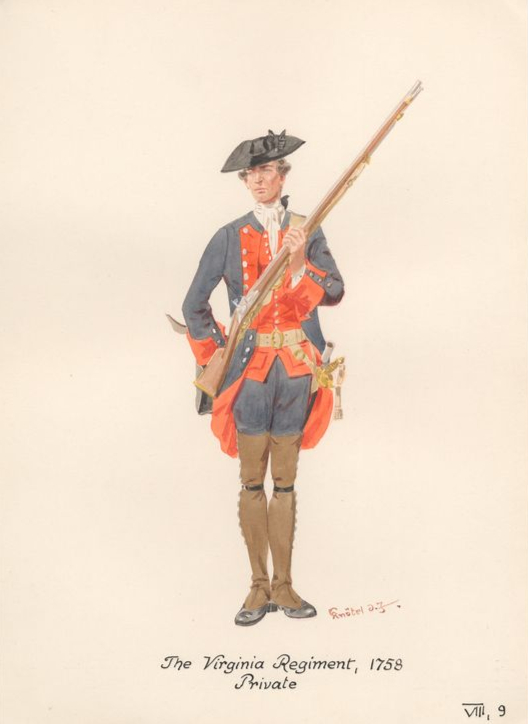
Illustration of a regimental private in 1758

The Anglo-French conflict over the Ohio Country led to raising of the first provincial regiment in the British colony of Virginia. In 1754, the Virginia General Assembly voted to raise a regiment of 300 men and send it to the confluence of the Alleghany and Monongahela rivers. After the battle of Fort Necessity, the General Assembly voted to increase the size of the regiment from five companies to ten. The Virginian provincial troops who participated in the Braddock Expedition of 1755 and suffered defeat at the Battle of the Monongahela were unregimented: at the behest of General Edward Braddock, they had been organized into two companies of carpenters, six companies of rangers, and one troop of mounted rangers, about 450 men in all. The remaining 350 men from the original ten companies of the Virginia Regiment had been allocated to the two regular regiments of the expedition.

After the defeat of the expedition, the Virginia Regiment was immediately reformed, with the General Assembly voting in 1755 to increase its size again, to 1,500 men organized in 16 companies. The actual strength of the Regiment in 1756 was 1,400 men, but in 1757 it was reduced to 1,000 men. In 1758, Virginia raised two additional regiments of a thousand men each for the Forbes Expedition. The enlistment period for the first regiment expired in May 1759, and for the second in December 1758. After the fall of Fort Duquesne, the General Assembly voted in 1759 to fill the one regiment still in service, and to raise a force of another 500 men that would remain in the province for its immediate defense. The regiment would remain in service until May 1760.

With the outbreak of the Anglo-Cherokee War, the General Assembly prolonged the Regiment's service, adding 300 men in three companies as frontier guards. It remained on the Cherokee frontier until early 1762, when Governor Francis Fauquier disbanded it. When, later in 1762, the British government indicated its wish for Virginia to raise a regiment which would be put on the British establishment, the General Assembly instead voted to re-raise the Virginia Regiment. This re-raised Regiment was finally disbanded in May 1763, just before the outbreak of Pontiac's War, as the province could not maintain it without a supply of paper money, which the Board of Trade had disallowed.

== Recruitment ==
Most recruits were characterized by Washington as "loose, Idle Persons ... quite destitute of House, and Home." Hampered by frequent desertions because of poor supplies, extremely low pay and hazardous duty, Virginia Regiment recruiters went to Pennsylvania and Maryland for men. Washington said of them, " and not a few... have Scarce a Coat, or Waistcoat, to their Backs ..." Later drafts pulled only those who could not provide a substitute or pay the £10 exemption fee, ensuring that only Virginia's poor would be drafted. White males between 16 and 50 were permitted to serve, although the regiment's size rolls report men as young as 15 and as old as 60 in the ranks, along with references to a small number of drafts with partial African and Native American ancestry.

== Legacy ==
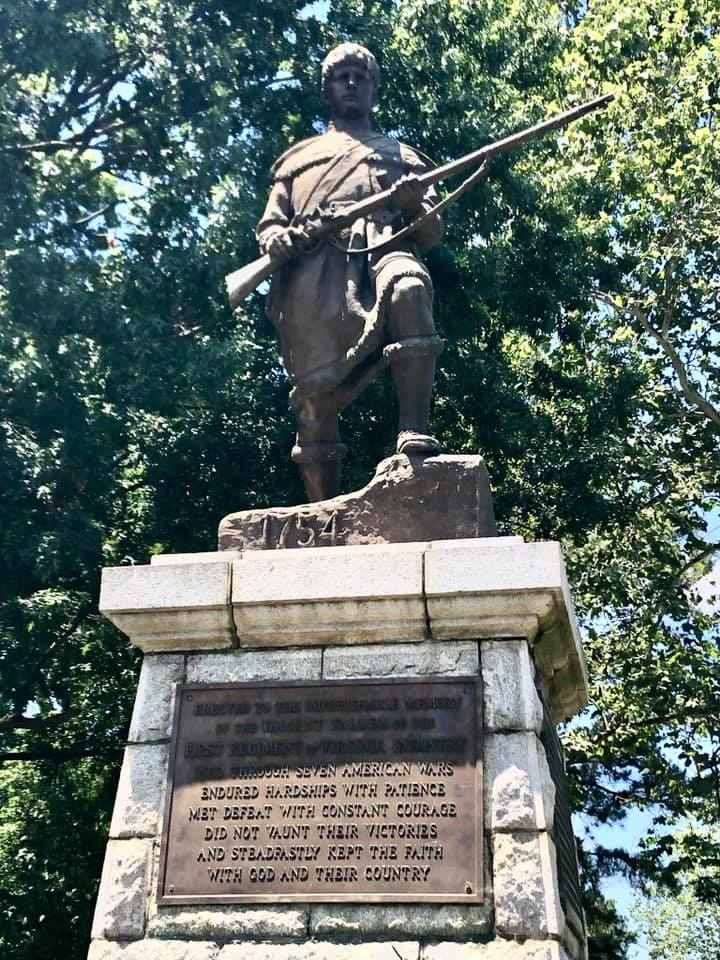
Statue dedicated to the First Virginia Regiment at Meadow Park in Richmond, Virginia

The First Virginia Regiment is memorialized in a statue in Meadow Park, a triangular park in Richmond’s Fan District by sculptor Ferruccio Legnaioli. Dedicated on 1 May 1930, to commemorate the regiment for fighting in seven American Wars, including the Civil War when they served in the Confederate Army. The statue is a seven foot high bronze standing figure of a colonial infantryman that lists the founding date of the Regiment (1754) at its base. The figure is mounted on a pedestal eight feet high which is lined with bronze plaques describing the history and service of the Regiment through seven wars. The statue was pulled down from its pedestal during the night of 19–20 June 2020. It was the fifth statue toppled in Richmond during the George Floyd protests in the United States.

== Colonels ==
- 1754 Colonel Joshua Fry
- 1754 Colonel George Washington.
- 1755–1757 Colonel George Washington.
- 1758: First Virginia Regiment, Colonel George Washington; Second Virginia Regiment, Colonel William Byrd III.
- 1759–1762 Colonel William Byrd III.
- 1762–1763 Colonel Adam Stephen.

== Uniforms ==
Period	Regimentals	Buttons	Facings	Waistcoat
1754–1755	Red	Silver	Red	Red
1755–1763	Blue	Silver	Red	Red

== Successors ==
- When the Colony of Virginia ordered the creation of multiple regiments in 1775 with the outbreak of the American Revolutionary War, these were called the Virginia Line.
- Virginia Army National Guard's 276th Engineer Battalion (United States) "First Virginia" can trace its origins to the Virginia Regiment.
- West Virginia Army National Guard's 201st Field Artillery Regiment can trace its origins to the Virginia Regiment.
- The 1st Virginia Regiment of the Virginia Defense Force is considered the present-day successor to the original Virginia Regiment.

== See also ==
- Great Britain in the Seven Years War
- Virginia militia
- 1st Virginia Regiment
- Virginia Defense Force
