= Robert E. Grant (politician) =

American politician

Member of the Virginia House of Delegates from the Washington County district
- In office December 7, 1857 – December 2, 1860 Serving with William L. Rice
- Preceded by: John B. Floyd
- Succeeded by: Jacob Lynch

Personal details
- Born: September 26, 1825 Washington County, Virginia, U.S.
- Died: July 17, 1888 (aged 62) Austin, Texas, U.S.
- Resting place: Oakwood Cemetery (Austin, Texas)
- Occupation: dentist, soldier

Military service
- Allegiance: Confederate States of America
- Branch/service: Confederate States Army
- Years of service: 1861–1862
- Rank: Captain
- Unit: 37th Virginia Infantry
- Battles/wars: First Battle of Kernstown

Robert E. Grant (September 26, 1825 – July 17, 1888) was a Virginia farmer and dentist who represented Washington County for one term in the Virginia House of Delegates and later at the Virginia Secession Convention of 1861. During the American Civil War, he recruited a company of the 37th Virginia Infantry, but failed to win re-election as captain, and ultimately moved to Texas in 1872 and re-established his practice.

== Early life and career ==
The first child born to farmer James Grant (1800–1886?) and his wife Elizabeth (1805 – before 1890), Robert E. Grant had three younger brothers and four younger sisters. Although neither he nor his father owned slaves in 1850, by 1860 in addition to employing a 27-year-old free black farm laborer, Grant owned a 40-year-old enslaved black man, and 24- and 12-year-old enslaved black females.

Grant married Ann Long Snodgrass on December 15, 1850, and they had nearly a dozen children, although several failed to reach adulthood.

== Career ==
In 1857, Washington County voters elected Grant to the Virginia House of Delegates. Although he failed to win re-election, Washington County voters elected him and fellow Unionist John Arthur Campbell as their delegates to the Virginia Secession Convention of 1861, defeating pro-secessionists William Y.C. White and Ben Rush Floyd. Grant initially supported Union, but either left or changed his vote at the end to support secession.

After Virginia's voters also ratified secession, and Confederate troops won at the First Battle of Manassas in July 1861, Grant recruited the King's Mountain Rifles in Abingdon and accepted a commission as its captain. His unit became Company H of the 37th Virginia Infantry, commanded by former judge Samuel V. Fulkerson. Capt. Grant served for less than a year in the unit, including during General Stonewall Jackson's Valley Campaign and the First Battle of Kernstown. His unit refused to re-elect him during the April 1862 reorganization, instead promoting Sergeant William F. Duff to captain of Company H.

== Final years, death and legacy ==
Grant moved his family to Austin, Texas in 1872. Virginia farmers had endured two seasons of terrible crops, and by 1880 his parents had also moved to Abbeville County, South Carolina to live with his sister and a grandson. Grant prospered financially in Texas, but died in Austin on July 17, 1888.
