= John Janney =

American lawyer

Member of the Virginia House of Delegates from Loudoun County
- In office 1834 – 1835 or 1845

Delegate to the Virginia Constitutional Convention of 1850 from Loudoun County
- In office October 14, 1850 – October 25, 1851

Presiding officer of the Virginia Secession Convention of 1861 and Delegate from Loudoun County
- In office February 13, 1861 – May 23, 1861

Personal details
- Born: November 8, 1798 Alexandria, Virginia, US
- Died: January 5, 1872 (aged 73) Loudoun County, Virginia, US
- Party: Whig
- Spouse: Alicia Marmaduke
- Profession: Law

John Janney (November 8, 1798 – January 5, 1872) was a member of the Whig Party in Virginia prior to its demise, delegate to the Virginia General Assembly from Loudoun County and served as President of the Virginia Secession Convention in 1861.

== Early life ==
John Janney was born November 8, 1798, in Alexandria, Virginia, to devout Quaker parents. When Janney was still a boy his parents moved to Goose Creek (present day Lincoln) in Loudoun County where there was a thriving Quaker community. Janney attended school at the local meeting house until he was teenager. He then left to study law at the county court in Leesburg under Richard Henderson. At 18, Janney was admitted to the bar of that court, where he quickly gained the respect of his peers as well as rose through the ranks of the local Whig Party.

== Early career ==
In 1831, he helped to draft a bill to abolish slavery in Virginia for the General Assembly. Two years later Janney was elected to that body's lower chamber as a delegate from Loudoun, a seat he held until either 1835 or 1845.

Despite his work on the abolition bill, Janney bought his first slave in 1834. Because Quakers did not allow its members to own slaves, Janney broke with the church and joined the Episcopal Church.

In 1841, Janney purchased a 580-acre tract of land from Thomas Ludwell Lee II in Loudoun County, Virginia as a summer home. That property would eventually be known as Ashburn Farm after it was sold by Janney in 1870.

Janney became a prominent member of the Virginia chapter of the American Colonization Society, and was its president several times in the 1850s. In 1847, Janney was one of three lawyers who defended Nelson Talbott Gant, a freed slave from Leesburg, who was accused of stealing his wife, still a slave, from her owner after the owner had refused to allow Gant to buy her freedom. Janney and his colleagues obtained Gant's acquittal by arguing that the bonds of marriage transcended those of slavery.

== Vice presidential candidacy ==
In 1839 the national Whig party held a convention to nominate its candidate for the upcoming presidential election. The choice came down to two men born in Virginia, but who had emigrated; Henry Clay of Kentucky and William Henry Harrison of Ohio. The Virginia delegation preferred Clay, but he had made too many enemies in his own party so the nomination went to Harrison. Acknowledging Virginia's large population and political clout, the Whig leadership asked the Virginia delegates to caucus and nominate their choice for vice president. Two men received nominations: John Janney of Loudoun (who had served as a delegate to several previous Whig conventions and had become known for supporting Clay) and John Tyler of Charles City County. The initial caucus vote ended in a tie, but the tidewater delegates used their political advantage to get Tyler, a tidewater aristocrat, over Janney, an upcountry Quaker, the nomination. Afterward, Janney confessed that, as was his custom, he voted not for himself but Tyler, thus causing the tie. Harrison died just one month into office and Tyler became president.

== Virginia Constitutional Convention of 1850 ==
In 1850 Janney received the second highest vote total in Loudoun County as a candidate for its three-member delegation to Virginia's Constitutional Convention. He served as chairman of the convention's Judiciary Committee between October 14, 1850, and 1 August 1851. Although the county's other two delegates opposed Janney's proposal to apportion General Assembly seats to allow slaveholders additional representation, such would have granted the county an additional seat. Janney ultimately voted against the proposed constitution which allowed for universal manhood suffrage, and popular election of judges and the governor (among other officials).

In 1851, Janney lost a race to become Virginia's U.S. senator. As the Whig party collapsed under sectional strain in the 1850s, Janney remained a committed Unionist, but his political activities dropped sharply after 1852.

== Secession and Civil War ==
A decade later, Janney became one of the founders of the Constitutional Union Party. In 1860 Janney owned three enslaved adults and two children. When the Commonwealth called a special convention to decide its course in the coming conflict, his Loudoun neighbors again chose Janney to represent them and advocate for remaining in the Union in 1861. Upon Janney's arrival in Richmond, fellow delegates chose him as the convention's president, and he took the chair with an emotional speech advocating remaining in the Union, and cheered the initial vote against secession, but his next speech, after shots were fired at Ft. Sumter, was less successful. After the second secession vote passed on April 17, Janney submitted to the seeming majority will and reversed his vote concerning the proposed secession referendum of May 23 to make the convention's support unanimous. Janney then voted for secession in the referendum and during the convention's second session in June signed the results into law. He traveled in November to Richmond for the convention's third session, debating amendments to the state constitution, but resigned as president on November 6, citing his poor health. Thus, as the convention's president, Janney gave Robert E. Lee command of the Commonwealth's forces.

== Death and legacy ==
Janney returned to his law practice in Loudoun, but had no public role during the conflict. His last public service was on a three-member commission which in 1866 investigated whether to reunite Virginia and West Virginia (which had seceded during the war). He died at home, in 1872.

Janney and his wife, Alice Marmaduke, had no children. However, his nephew Charles Janney won election as the Loudoun county clerk, and served for several years until he was admitted to the Loudoun County bar in 1871. The Janney family papers are held at Virginia Tech. Janneys Lane, a street in Alexandria, Virginia near Quaker Lane and the Virginia Theological Seminary is named after the family.

He was portrayed by actor Robert Easton in Gods and Generals.

== See also ==
- Virginia Constitutional Convention of 1850
- Virginia Secession Convention
