= Preston, West Virginia =

Preston
- Unincorporated community
- Location within the state of West Virginia Preston (the United States)
- Coordinates: 39°26′6″N 79°41′8″W
- Country: United States
- State: West Virginia
- County: Preston
- Elevation: 1,299 ft (396 m)
- Time zone: UTC-5 (Eastern (EST))
  - Summer (DST): UTC-4 (EDT)
- GNIS ID: 1555406

Preston is an unincorporated community and coal town in Preston County, West Virginia, United States.
