= Addison Hall =

American politician

Addison Hall (1797-April 2, 1871) was a prominent citizen of Virginia who was a reverend and served in the Virginia House of Delegates from 1823 to 1829. He was a member of Morattico Baptist Church. His children included a daughter, Henrietta Hall Shuck, who became a missionary to China. His son Carey Judson Hall became an educator, ran a school, and named one of his son's Addison Hall.

He divorced his wife over infidelity.

He took in his brother's widow and their three children. In 1832 he wrote to Col. Robert W. Carter in Richmond, Virginia.
