= James McGrew =

American politician (1813–1910)

James Clark McGrew
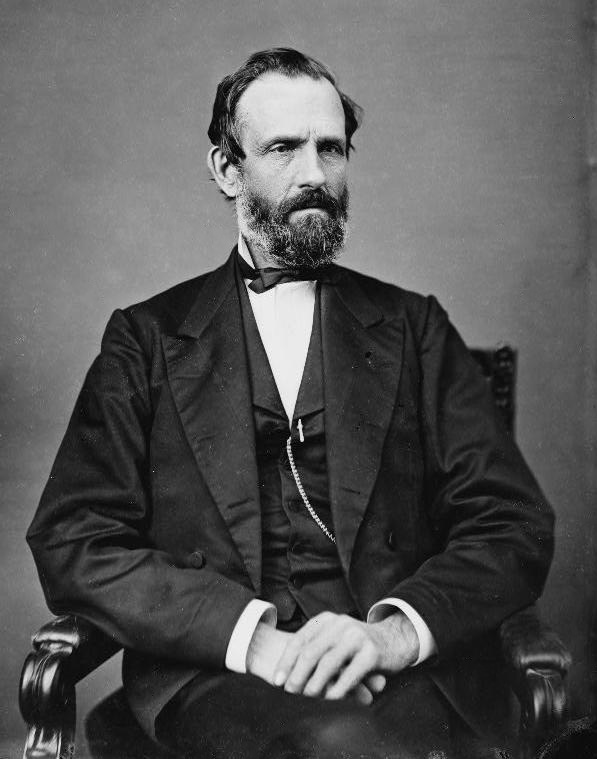

Member of the U.S. House of Representatives from West Virginia's 2nd district
- In office March 4, 1869 – March 3, 1873
- Preceded by: Bethuel Kitchen
- Succeeded by: John Hagans

Member of the West Virginia House of Delegates
- In office 1863-1865

Personal details
- Born: September 14, 1813 Brandonville, Virginia, U.S.
- Died: September 18, 1910 (aged 97) Kingwood, West Virginia, U.S.
- Party: Republican
- Spouse: Persis Hagans McGrew

James Clark McGrew (September 14, 1813 – September 18, 1910) was an American politician from Virginia and West Virginia.

== Early and family life ==
Born near Brandonville, Virginia (now West Virginia), to James McGrew (1779–1873) and his wife Isabella Clark McGrew (1779–1867), young James McGrew attended common schools as a child. His ancestors had lived in Preston County since the American Revolutionary war, and his father fought in the War of 1812.

He married Persis Hagans (1831–1892). Their children who survived to adulthood included William Clark McGrew (1842–1919) (who became a banker, railroad executive, state delegate and senator and 5-time mayor of Morgantown), Sarah Martha McGrew Heermans (1844–1930) and Rev. George Harrison McGrew (1846–1917), who married the medical missionary, Dr. Julia Lore.

== Career ==
As an adult, McGrew was a merchant and banker in Kingwood, Virginia.

Preston County, Virginia voters elected McGrew and Congressman William Gay Brown, Sr. as their delegates to the Virginia Secession Convention in 1861, where both were Unionists and voted against secession on both April 4 (when the ordinance was defeated) and April 17 (when it passed). The Wheeling Convention was held on May 13–15, led by Preston County's William B. Zinn. On June 29, 1861, after Virginia voters approved secession, other delegates expelled them from the convention, and replaced them with secessionist Preston County lawyers Robert E. Cowan and Charles J. P. Cresap.

Nonetheless, Kingwood voters elected McGrew as their mayor, and voters of Preston and surrounding counties elected him to represent them in the newly created West Virginia House of Delegates alongside Zinn after West Virginia was admitted to the Union. McGrew served in both positions from 1863 to 1865. McGrew also was managing director of the West Virginia Insane Hospital for four years during and after the American Civil War.

In 1868, voters elected McGrew as a Republican to the United States House of Representatives, where he served from 1869 to 1873. He was again mayor of Kingwood, West Virginia in 1879 and 1880 and afterwards resumed banking in Kingwood from 1886 until his death.

== Death and legacy ==
McGrew survived his wife by nearly two decades and lived to see his sons begin their careers in public service. He died in Kingwood on September 18, 1910, and was interred in Maplewood Cemetery.

In 1989, the James Clark McGrew Society was formed to foster understanding of this founder of West Virginia. The house which he built in 1841 (and which others later expanded) was restored and listed on the National Register of Historic Places in 1993. Now owned by Preston County, the James Clark McGrew House hosts various activities.

U.S. House of Representatives
Preceded by Bethuel Kitchen	Member of the U.S. House of Representatives from West Virginia's 2nd congressional district March 4, 1869 – March 4, 1873	Succeeded by John Hagans
