= North Western Virginia Railroad =

Map

The North Western Virginia Railroad was chartered by the Virginia General Assembly on February 14, 1851, in order to build track from Grafton, West Virginia to Parkersburg, West Virginia. Future statehood advocate and U.S. Senator Peter G. Van Winkle of Parkersburg began as the company's secretary in 1852 and served as its president through the American Civil War.

== Rival routes ==
Although western Virginia farmers (as well as timber and mine interests) had long wished a railroad to transport their produce and raw materials for sale to eastern cities, the Virginia General Assembly had heavily favored the interests of its ports, especially Richmond, Virginia (on the James River) and Norfolk, Virginia (the major civilian port at Hampton Roads). Thus it had subsidized the James River Canal, as well as various central Virginia railroads which in 1850 were renamed the Virginia Central Railroad. However, neither Virginia corporation was able to finish planned construction across the Appalachian Mountains. The canal route planned early in the century would have connected to the Kanawha River, which joined the Ohio River at Parkersburg, but digging proved expensive, as was continual cleanup of flood debris and damage. The Virginia Central Railroad spun off the Blue Ridge Railroad to reach the Shenandoah Valley mid-century, but was only able to reach Clifton Forge by 1857, far short of crossing the Appalachians.

Meanwhile, the Baltimore and Ohio Railroad (B&O) had chosen a less mountainous route to connect to the Ohio River valley. Its route to some extent paralleled the National Road, which crossed the Ohio River at Wheeling. Because the Chesapeake and Ohio Canal was its rival for shipping coal (early coal fields were developed in western Maryland), it had refused to allow the B&O to lay track along the canal's right of way. Thus, the B&O chose a route on the other side of the Potomac River through Harpers Ferry, Virginia. Still, crossing mountains increased costs and caused delays, as did financial panics, and the B&O needed a charter extension in 1847 from the Virginia General Assembly. As part of the compromise that allowed the B&O to reach Wheeling, the B&O would also lay track to Grafton, where eventually it connected with the North Western Virginia Railroad.

Thus, the B&O reached Wheeling in 1853 and expected the North Western Virginia Railroad to reach Parkersburg in about a year, although that line actually opened in July, 1857. Trackage connected to St. Louis, Missouri, eventually superseding the still-dangerous Ohio River steamboats. Meanwhile, another rival line, the Pennsylvania Railroad (which moved passengers and freight to Philadelphia) sought connections to western Virginia at Wheeling (via the Hempfield Railroad) as well as to Marietta, Ohio (10 miles north of Parkersburg; via the Pittsburgh and Connellsville Railroad).

== American Civil War ==
Both Union and Confederate forces recognized the strategic importance of the North Western Virginia Railroad as well as the B&O. As the American Civil War began, CSA General Robert E. Lee initially vowed to protect the railroad, and sent first CSA Major Francis M. Boykin Jr., then CSA Col. George A. Porterfield (a Virginia Military Institute graduate from Charles Town across from Harpers Ferry) to recruit at Grafton. Neither had much success, however, nor did CSA Major Alonzo Loring at Wheeling. Instead, local Grafton lawyer George R. Latham commanded the local militia, which after Virginia voters (but not those in western Virginia) approved secession on May 23, took the train to Wheeling and became Company B of the Second Virginia Volunteer Infantry (U.S.). Moreover, the Clarksburg Resolution called for western Virginians to meet at Wheeling; 400 men (including Latham) met at what became the Wheeling Convention on May 13 and agreed to work against the upcoming secession vote.

Meanwhile, President Lincoln appointed George B. McClellan (who had resigned from the Regular Army in 1857 to run railroads, first as chief engineer of the Illinois Central Railroad then as President of the Ohio and Mississippi Railroad), as commander of the Department of the Ohio. McClellan quickly moved to protect the railroads in his jurisdiction, sending troops and cannon to Marietta to protect the rail line to Cincinnati, as well as massing forces across the Ohio River to protect the B&O in the event Virginia voted for secession. In response, Porterfield burned two bridges on the main B&O line (at Farmington and Mannington) and one on the Parkersburg line. McClellan responded by sending B&O freight agent Benjamin F. Kelley, who had moved to Wheeling in 1826 and commanded the local militia, to Grafton to protect the rail lines (as well as repair the bridges, which proved relatively easy because the underlying iron trusses had survived). Col. James Steedman and the 14th Ohio Regiment were also sent to protect Grafton, traveling via the railroad from Parkersburg. The pincer movement caused Porterfield to abandon Grafton on May 28 and move his 500 men to Philippi, where they received about 400 reinforcements. Kelley planned to attack the Confederates and drive them away from the vital railroads, and soon Brig. Gen. Thomas A. Morris of Indiana arrived, along with Col. Ebenezer Dumont and the 7th Indiana Infantry. The Confederates, realizing themselves vastly outnumbered, fled, leaving more than 750 muskets, ammunition, wagons, horses, medical supplies and tents behind, so the Battle of Philippi (West Virginia) would sometimes be called the "Philippi Races." Gen. Lee soon replaced Porterfield with CSA Gen. Robert S. Garnett. However, Col. Kelley was shot in the chest during the battle, becoming one of the six Union casualties. Meanwhile, the Union victory secured Grafton and a regiment was stationed at Rowlesburg to protect the crucial Tray Run Viaduct. On July 11, Gen. McClellan would defeat CSA Gen. Garnett's force at the Battle of Rich Mountain and thus secure the Staunton-Parkersburg Turnpike as far as Cheat Mountain. Kelley would thereafter face many challenges rebuilding western Virginia railroad infrastructure destroyed by Confederate bushwhackers, but as he recovered was promoted to Brigadier General and given command of the Railroad Division with headquarters at Grafton.

The North Western Virginia railroad and its rail yard and machine shops at Grafton were also a probable objective of the Jones-Imboden Raid in April 1863. Raiders destroyed the 3-span bridge across the Monongahela River at Fairmont, West Virginia due north of Grafton (the largest on the line), but the rail yards protected by Mulligan's Brigade, the First and Eighth Maryland and Miner's Indiana battery were not attacked. Nor was well-defended Rowlesburg, nor Clarksburg, the largest Union supply base in western Virginia, defended by 5000 men in fortified positions. Instead, Gen. Grumble Jones attacked the North Western Virginia Railroad, defended by the Second West Virginia Union Infantry, skirmishing and burning two small bridges at Smithton and three sixty-foot sections over the North Fork of the Hughes River, before rejecting a proffered ransom and spectacularly burning the oil field at Burning Springs and returning to Virginia.

== Postwar ==
Becomes Parkersburg Branch Railroad 1865 and is listed as such in Poor's Manual of Railroads; the entire issue of preferred Stock owned by Baltimore and Ohio Railroad. Contracts dated July 18, 1864 according to Poor's Manual of Railroads indicate the Baltimore and Ohio Railroad bought out the interest of Baltimore City North Western Virginia bonds. Mileage: 103 to 104 depending on edition of Poor's; in 1883-1884 Poor's including Ohio River bridge 105.4 miles Net earnings for North Western Virginia;

1861: $40,610 1862: $97,357 1863: $42,126 1864: $127,035 1865: $49,012 1865 Parkersburg Branch earnings: $91,889
