= George W. Thompson (politician) =

American politician

George Western Thompson
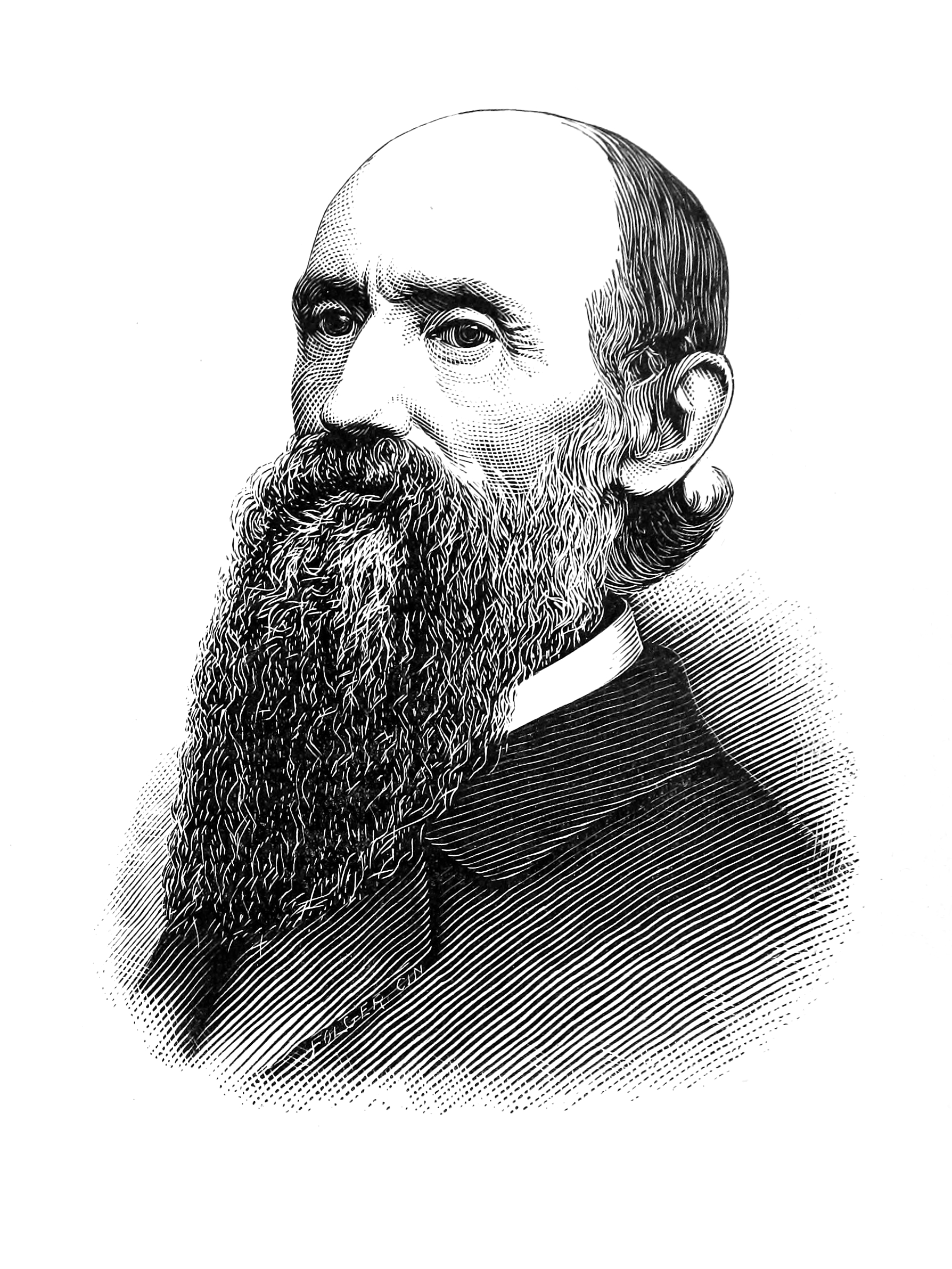

Member of the U.S. House of Representatives from Virginia's 15th district
- In office March 4, 1851 – July 30, 1852
- Preceded by: Thomas Haymond
- Succeeded by: Sherrard Clemens

Personal details
- Born: May 14, 1806 St. Clairsville, Ohio, US
- Died: February 24, 1888 (aged 81) Wheeling, West Virginia, US
- Party: Democratic
- Spouse: Elizabeth Steenrod
- Profession: Politician, Lawyer, Judge

George Western Thompson (May 14, 1806 – February 24, 1888) was a nineteenth-century Virginia politician, lawyer and judge. He served one term in the U.S. House of Representatives, resigning to become a state judge. During the American Civil War Judge Thompson resigned that position as because he believed the creation of West Virginia to be illegal.

== Early and family life ==
Born in St. Clairsville, Ohio, Thompson graduated from Jefferson College in 1824, then studied law in Richmond, Virginia.

He married Elizabeth Steenrod (1817-1897). They had four sons, none of whom survived their mother, and two daughters. Their sons included Confederate Col. William P. Thompson (1837-1896, who became a vice president of Standard Oil as well as president of the Lead Trust); Lewis Thompson (1833-1918); George Western Thompson (1846-1895, who served a president of the Ohio River Railroad, and was married to Frances Belle Jackson, daughter of General John Jay Jackson); and Daniel Steenrod Thompson (1853-1893). His daughter Anna Gaither Thompson married Johnson Newlon Camden who became a prominent industrialist, banker and railroad organizer in West Virginia and U.S. Senator, although both his gubernatorial runs failed.

== Career ==
After admission to the Ohio bar in 1826, Thompson began his legal practice in St. Clairsville in 1828.

In 1837, he moved to Wheeling in what was then Virginia but is now West Virginia. He became active in politics as a Democrat. In 1838, he was appointed deputy postmaster of Wheeling. He was later appointed to a commission to settle jurisdiction over the Ohio River between Virginia and Ohio.

In 1848, President James K. Polk appointed Thompson as judge of United States District Court for the Western District of Virginia, and he served until 1850. He was electied to the United States House of Representatives in 1850, serving from 1851 until his resignation in 1852 when the Virginia General Assembly elected him judge of the circuit court.

As both Representative and state judge, he was involved in cases involving the Wheeling Suspension Bridge (completed in 1849) and a nearby railroad bridge which helped Wheeling become an important gateway city between the Ohio River valley and Eastern and international markets. The bridge impeded large steamboats on the river. As Representative, Thompson introduced documents supporting the bridge (including resolutions of the Ohio and Virginia state legislatures). Congress passed a law declaring it a post road, so it was not torn down despite the United States Supreme Court finding it impeded Ohio River navigation. Virginia's General Assembly reelected Thompson as circuit judge in 1860.

In 1861, Virginia declared secession. Unionists from northwestern Virginia held the Wheeling Convention which established the Restored Government of Virginia. Thompson left office in 1861, refusing to take the oath of office to support what he believed was an unconstitutional action to set up the present state of West Virginia. Ralph Lazier Berkshire, whom he had defeated in the 1860 judicial contest and who supported West Virginia statehood, was elected his successor and later first chief justice of the West Virginia Supreme Court of Appeals.

His son William P. Thompson (1837-1896) became a lawyer in Virginia. In 1857, he recruited the "Marion Greys" militia company and later became a colonel of the Confederate 19th Virginia Infantry Regiment. After the war, he joined with his brother-in-law and another man and became president of the Camden Consolidated Oil Company. In 1881, Camden merged into Standard Oil Company; Thompson became vice-president and moved to Cleveland.

Another son, George Western Thompson (1846-1895), served as president of the Ohio River Railroad until his death.

== Death and legacy ==
Meanwhile, Judge Thompson retired to his estate near Wheeling, West Virginia where he eventually died on February 24, 1888. He was interred there in Stone Church cemetery in Elm Grove.

U.S. House of Representatives
Preceded by Thomas Haymond	Member of the U.S. House of Representatives from Virginia's 15th congressional district March 4, 1851 – July 30, 1852 (obsolete district)	Succeeded by Sherrard Clemens
