= Restored Government of Virginia =

Unionist government of Virginia

- Restored state government of United States
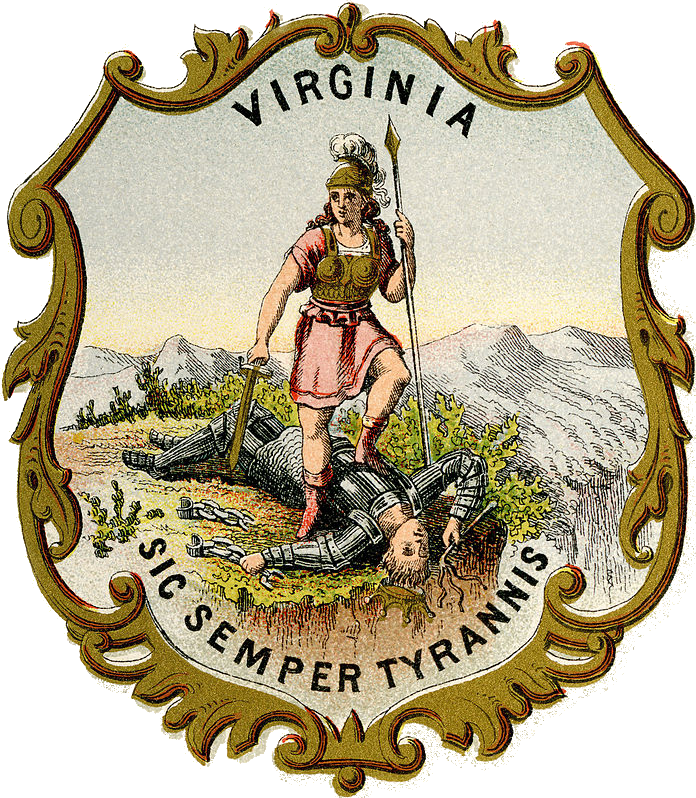
- US flag after West Virginian admission (1863–1865) Coat of arms

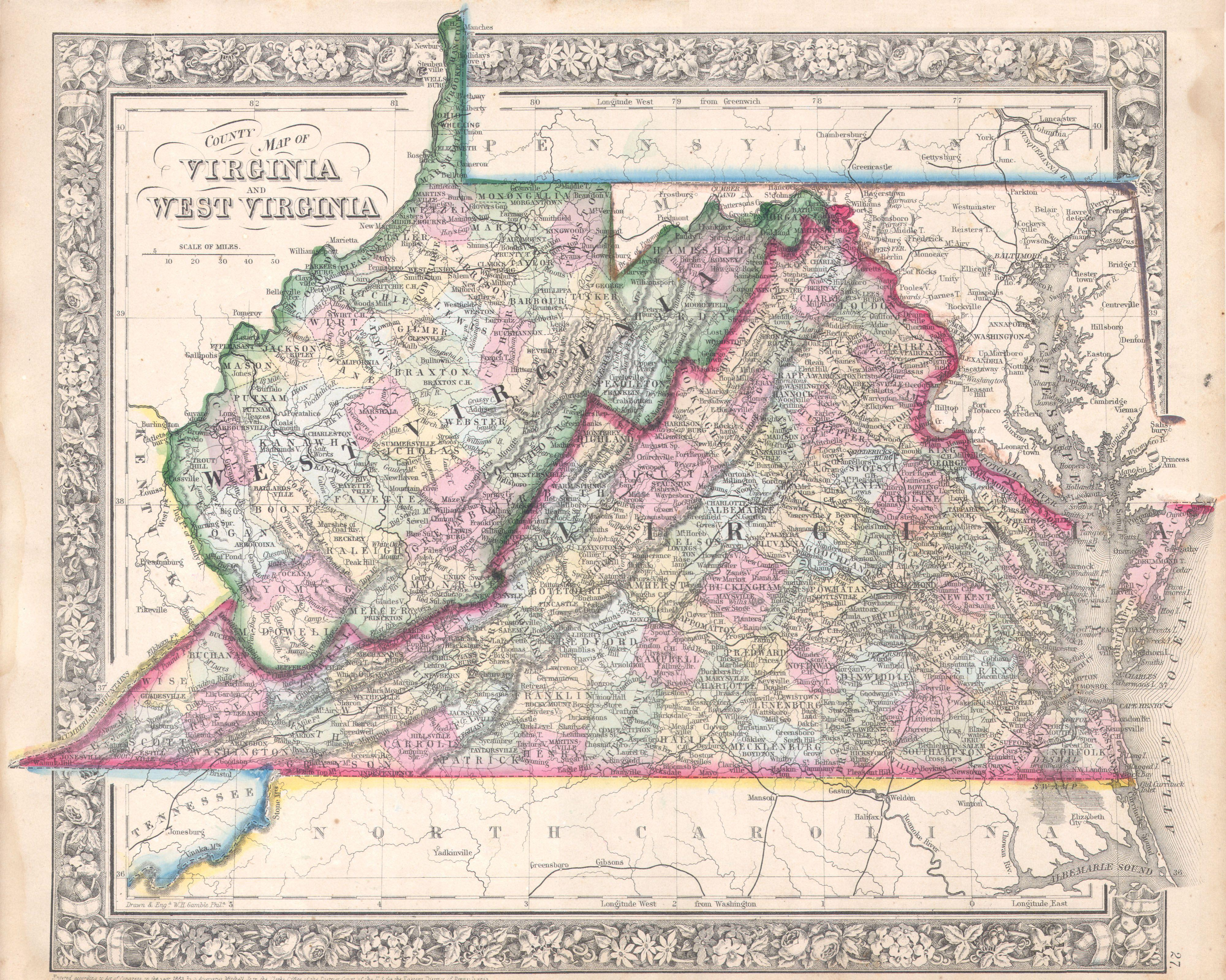
- 1864 map of the states of West Virginia and Virginia by Samuel Augustus Mitchell. The Restored Government of Virginia asserted itself to be the rightful state government of these lands until the admission of the State of West Virginia into the Union in 1863. After this, it claimed to be the lawful government of the modern state boundaries of Virginia. Over the following two years, it assumed actual control of the entirety of Virginia's postbellum territory as the Union Army occupied it by force of arms.
- Capital: Richmond (1861–1865) (de jure); Wheeling (1861–1863) (de facto); Alexandria (1863–1865) (de facto)
- Government
  - Type: Organized incorporated state/Shadow government
- Governor
  - 1861–1865: Francis Harrison Pierpont
- Historical era: American Civil War (1861–1865)
  - Second Wheeling Convention: June 11, 1861
  - Formation of a new state government: June 19, 1861
  - West Virginia admitted to the U.S.: June 20, 1863
  - Surrender of the Confederacy: April 9, 1865
  - Provisional government formed in Richmond: May 9, 1865
Preceded by	Succeeded by
Virginia	West Virginia; Virginia

The Restored (or Reorganized) Government of Virginia was the Unionist government of Virginia during the American Civil War (1861–1865) in opposition to the government that had approved Virginia's seceding from the United States and joining the new Confederate States. Each state government regarded the other as illegitimate. The Restored Government attempted to assume de facto control of the Commonwealth's northwest with the help of the Union Army but was only partly successful. It raised Union regiments from local volunteers but depended upon recruits from Pennsylvania and Ohio to fulfill its commitments. It administered this territory until, with its approval, the area became part of West Virginia in mid-1863.

The Restored Government thereafter continued to operate, albeit with very limited actual authority, within what it considered to be the Commonwealth's new borders under the protection of the Union Army. The Restored Government therefore became a shadow government similar in many respects to the state governments loyal to the Confederacy that claimed Kentucky and Missouri; however, unlike those governments, Virginia's Unionist government was never completely expelled from its claimed territory and thus did not become a government in exile. Until the end of hostilities, most of its de jure territory remained controlled by the secessionist state government, which never recognized either Unionist state government operating within its antebellum borders. Furthermore, since the Restored Government's claimed territory not under secessionist control only remained so by force of arms, it was placed under Federal martial law, thus further limiting the authority of the Unionist civilian government.

The Restored Government had only executive and legislative branches; it did not form a judicial branch. It met in Wheeling, in the extreme northwestern corner of the state, until that became part of West Virginia. From August 26, 1863, until June 1865, it met in Alexandria on the right bank of the Potomac River, which had been occupied by Union Army forces in 1861 to protect the adjacent national capital of Washington, D.C. The Restored Government adopted a new state constitution in 1864 abolishing slavery, and, the following year, ratified the Thirteenth Amendment to the United States Constitution. From its formation, the Restored Government claimed the state's antebellum capital of Richmond (which also became the Confederacy's national capital) as its own de jure capital city. It moved there near the end of the war after the Confederate States government and General-in-Chief Robert E. Lee's Army of Northern Virginia evacuated it as their capital in late March 1865, and the city returned to Federal control.

== Formation ==
Historical population
Year	Pop.	±%
1860	376,688	—
Source: 1860 (West Virginia only);

When the Second Wheeling Convention met in its first session, in June 1861, it adopted "A Declaration of the People of Virginia". The declaration stated that the Virginia Declaration of Rights required any substantial change in the form or nature of state government to be approved by the people. Since the Virginia secession convention had been convened by the legislature, not the people, the declaration pronounced the secession convention illegal, and that all of its acts—including the Ordinance of Secession—were ipso facto void. It also declared the pro-secession government void and called for a reorganization of the state government, taking the line that all state officials who had acceded to the Ordinance of Secession had effectively vacated their offices. The members and officers of the Restored Government had themselves not been elected by the people to the offices they had assumed, but instead convened on the basis of local petition and other irregular accreditation, some "more or less self-appointed".

The convention then elected Francis Harrison Pierpont as governor, along with other executive officers, with Wheeling as the provisional state capital. 16th President Abraham Lincoln recognized the Restored Government as the legitimate government of the entire Commonwealth of Virginia. The United States Congress seated the two new United States Senators chosen by its legislature, and five U.S. representatives elected from the territories that remained loyal to the Union or were occupied by the Union Army. Its Congressional delegation in the 37th United States Congress was entirely made up of Unconditional Unionists. U.S. Senators elected were Waitman T. Willey and John S. Carlile. Representatives were seated from where delegates in the Richmond Convention of 1861 had voted to remain in the Union. They were the western 10th, William G. Brown, the 11th, Jacob B. Blair, and 12th, Kellian V. Whaley, in Congressional Districts of counties that would mostly become the 35th State of West Virginia, along with the 7th, Charles H. Upton, from Alexandria and Fairfax County, and the 1st, Joseph E. Segar in the Eastern Shore and Tidewater Peninsulas. Following the loss of its governance over the population of West Virginia, Congress in the 38th United States Congress did not seat either Senators elected by the Restored General Assembly, nor Representatives elected in truncated elections in Union-occupied areas of Virginia; the entire state's delegation went vacant.

By the end of 1861, large Confederate States Army forces had abandoned western Virginia after contesting the region with overwhelming Federal units, but small brigades of Confederate soldiers commanded by William Lowther Jackson and Albert G. Jenkins operated throughout the area during the war. In 1862 the Kanawha valley was retaken by Confederate troops under the command of Brig. Gen. William W. Loring, but Union forces soon regained the region. The Restored Government attempted to exercise de facto authority, at least over the western counties, but had control of no more than half of the fifty counties that became West Virginia. On August 22, 1862, the Restored Government's Adjutant General, Henry I. Samuels, reported to Gov. Pierpont that there were 22 counties in which they could raise Union volunteers, but "...in several of the Counties I have named, a draft would be an operation of extreme difficulty...."

== Government in Wheeling ==
Some delegates of the Wheeling conventions began calling for a separate state, which caused friction within the conventions and the Unionist government. A key obstacle to separate admission to the Union was that a provision in the United States Constitution of 1787 forbade the creation of new states out of existing ones without the consent of the existing state's legislature. Soon after the President and the Congress recognized the Restored Government as the legitimate government of Virginia, it asserted its authority to give such consent. A popular referendum in October 1861 was called on the creation of the new "State of Kanawha" from the northwestern counties of the old Commonwealth of Virginia. While statehood was more popular in the far northwestern counties it did not have widespread support in the counties that were to compose the new state.

Although the October voter approval led to a constitutional convention, the numbers were disappointing to the state makers. At the constitutional convention delegate Chapman J. Stuart detailed the results- "...even a majority of the people within the district composed of the thirty-nine counties have never come to the polls and expressed their sentiments in favor of a new State. In a voting population of some 40,000 or 50,000 we see a poll of only 17,627 and even some of them were in the [Union] army." The voters' approval led to a constitutional convention, and another popular vote on April 3, 1862, approving the new constitution for a new state, the now renamed "West Virginia", but again the turnout was low. The statehood referendum as well as the constitutional convention were conducted by members of the 2nd Wheeling Convention rather than the Reorganized Government. The legislature of the Reorganized Government gave its consent to the creation of a new state on May 13, 1862. The U.S. Congress then passed a statehood bill for West Virginia, but with the added condition that slaves be emancipated in the new state, and that certain disputed counties be excluded.

President Lincoln, although reluctant to divide Virginia during a war aimed at re-uniting the country, signed the statehood bill into law on December 31, 1862. In Wheeling, the added conditions required another constitutional convention and popular referendum. Statehood was achieved on June 20, 1863 as West Virginia was admitted as the 35th state in the Union and an additional star was added to the American flag a few weeks later on Independence Day on the Fourth of July.

=== Restored Legislature of Virginia in Wheeling ===
The following table shows the legislature of the Restored Government. Some had been elected to the General Assembly in Richmond but refused to assume office there. Those counties marked with an * are still in Virginia. Legislators with a + after their names had been in the previous General Assembly.

County/Counties	Name	Office
*Accomac	Powell, Samuel W.	Delegate
*Alexandria	Miner, Gilbert S.	Delegate
Barbour	Myers, David M.	Delegate
Berkeley	Kitchen, Bethuel B.	Delegate
Boone, Logan, Wyoming	Baker, Joseph H.	Delegate
Brooke	Crothers, H.W.	Delegate
Cabell	Wright, Edward B.	Delegate
*Fairfax	Hawxhurst, John	Delegate
Gilmer, Calhoun, Wirt	Williamson, James A.	Delegate
Hampshire	Trout, James H.	Delegate
Hampshire	Downey, Owen D.	Delegate
Hancock	Porter, George McC. +	Delegate
Hardy	Michael, John	Delegate
Harrison	Davis, John J.	Delegate
Harrison	Vance, John C.	Delegate
Jackson, Roane	Frost, Daniel +	Delegate
Kanawha, Roane	Ruffner, Lewis	Delegate
Lewis	Arnold, George T.	Delegate
Marion	Smith, Fountain	Delegate
Marion	Fast, Richard	Delegate
Marshall	Swan, Remembrance	Delegate
Mason	Wetzel, Lewis	Delegate
Monongalia	Kramer, Leroy	Delegate
Monongalia	Snyder, Joseph	Delegate
Ohio	Logan, Thomas H.	Delegate
Ohio	Wilson, Andrew	Delegate
Pleasants, Ritchie	Williamson, James W.	Delegate
Preston	Zinn, William B.	Delegate
Preston	Hooten, Charles	Delegate
Putnam	Bowyer, George C.	Delegate
Randolph, Tucker	Parsons, Solomon	Delegate
Taylor	Davidson, Lemuel E.	Delegate
Tyler, Doddridge	Boreman, William I.	Delegate
Upshur	Farnsworth, Dan D.T.	Delegate
Wayne	Radcliffe, William	Delegate
Wetzel	West, James G.	Delegate
Wood	Moss, John W.	Delegate
*Accomac, *Northampton	Watson, G.F.	Senator
*Alexandria, *Fairfax	Close, James T.	Senator
Calhoun, Gilmer, Lewis, Upshur, Barbour, Randolph, Tucker	Jackson, Blackwell	Senator
Hampshire, Hardy, Morgan	Carskadon, James	Senator
Hancock, Brooke, Ohio	Gist, Joseph	Senator
Marshall, Wetzel, Tyler, Marion	Burley, James	Senator
Mason, Cabell, Wayne, Jackson, Wirt, Roane	Flesher, Andrew	Senator
Monongalia, Preston, Taylor	Cather, Thomas	Senator
Ritchie, Doddridge, Harrison, Pleasants, Wood	Stuart, Chapman J.	Senator

=== Voting and civilian arrests ===
When President Lincoln signed the West Virginia statehood bill he issued a statement which included a comment on voting: "We can not well deny that it is such, unless we do so upon the outside knowledge that the body was chosen at elections, in which a majority of the qualified voters of Virginia did not participate. But it is a universal practice in the popular elections in all these States to give no legal consideration whatever to those who do not choose to vote, as against the effect of the votes of those who do choose to vote". There was no acknowledgment of the difficulties of voting in the midst of a civil war, which were many. Members of the Restored Government however took note of the difficulty of a fair vote. On August 16, 1861, a few days before a statehood ordinance was created, the Lt. Gov. Daniel Polsley and Daniel Lamb of Ohio County objected to a wartime vote on division, Lamb stated, "It is a fact that within the boundaries proposed by the report of the majority of the Committee, you cannot now have a fair and full expression of one-fourth of the people upon any subject."

The various polls which took place under the aegis of the Restored Government were not for the "qualified voters of Virginia" as they were before the start of the war, the definition of "qualified" now referred to those who supported both the Federal government as well as the Restored Government. An oath was formulated and almost immediately implemented, called the "double oath", which required the foresworn to support both governments. This of course excluded those who supported the Richmond or Confederate governments, as well as Unionists who did not support the Pierpont government in Wheeling.

"I, ________, solemnly swear that I will support the Constitution of the United States and the laws made in pursuance thereof, as the supreme law of the land, anything in the Constitution and laws of the State of Virginia, or in the Ordinances of the Convention which assembled at Richmond on the 13th day of February, 1861, to the contrary notwithstanding; And that I will uphold and defend the government of Virginia as vindicated and restored by the Conventions which assembled in Wheeling on the 11th Day of June, 1861".

The "double oath" was used erratically in the early years of the war, those who refused to take it were sometimes arrested and sent to the Wheeling Atheneum, which had been converted to a prison, and sometimes to Camp Chase, a Federal prison in Columbus, Ohio. The Restored Government had enacted an ordinance on June 19, 1861, titled "An Ordinance to authorize the apprehending of suspicious persons in time of war". A Union captain, investigating conditions at Camp Chase for Col. William Hoffman, reviewed the records of West Virginia civilian prisoners and reported- "Many others have been sent here under equally slight charges whose cases I will soon submit to you, at least copies of their official records as transmitted by him to Camp Chase, for I believe it cannot be your desire that this camp should be filled to overflowing with political prisoners (made by half depopulating a section of country where inhabitants are often compelled to expressions of apparent sympathy) arrested on frivolous charges, to be supported by the General Government and endure a long confinement."

In counties which the Restored Government controlled, or partially controlled, officials such as sheriffs and judges were replaced by supporters of the Pierpont government, and it was the practice of Confederate forces to arrest such officials when encountered, as in the case of the sheriff of Barbour County, who was arrested in 1862 by Gen. Imboden and sent to prison in Richmond.

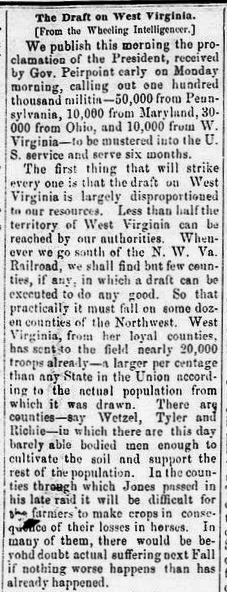
Morgantown Monitor, June 20, 1863, western Virginia military situation

In December 1862 Pierpont asked the legislature in Wheeling for another law to allow for the arrest of private civilians for the express purpose of hostage taking, which was passed by the legislature on Feb. 4. The numerous arrests, particularly in the case of Judge George W. Thompson of Wheeling, prompted the U.S. Judge-Advocate General, Joseph Holt, to complain to the Secretary of War, Edwin Stanton, that Gov. Pierpont was interfering with the Federal prisoner exchange program and that he was transcending the ordinary police power "which he is authorized as Governor to exercise over rebels within his jurisdiction..." No actual violation of law was required for arrest, just the suspicion of disloyalty to the Union and Wheeling governments.

Further laws were enacted requiring an oath of loyalty for anyone seeking a business license and applied as well to "Grand and Petit Jurors, to lawyers, doctors, dentists, ministers of the gospel, who desire to solemnize marriages, surgeons, and so forth.".

There were some prominent Unionists, such as John Jay Jackson Sr. and Sherrard Clemens, who believed that the Wheeling government was not legitimate. Secessionists predictably denied both the Federal and Wheeling governments as illegitimate. The presence of these two groups was made apparent in the repeatedly low turnouts for the Restored government's initiatives. Sherrard Clemens urged his supporters to boycott the polls as a show of opposition to Wheeling and statehood.

The breakdown of county governments crippled voting for both the Richmond and Wheeling governments. Many votes were taken outside their respective counties by refugees, and in some instances voting by soldiers was included in county returns. In 1861 the vote in favor of statehood credited to Hampshire County, for instance, was made almost entirely by non-resident soldiers. After 1861 soldier votes were often included in county returns, and the first West Virginia constitution of 1863 continued to allow it.

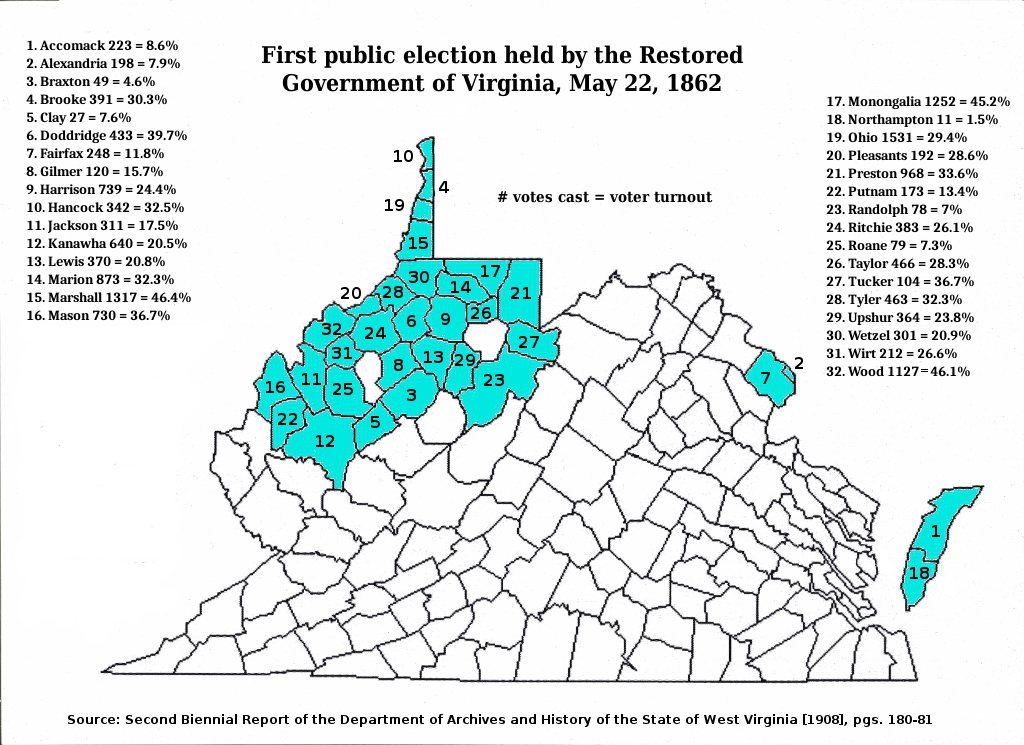
Restored Government of Virginia election May 22, 1862

On May 22, 1862, the first public vote for state offices for the Restored Government was held, resulting in a turnout of 14,824 voters with returns credited to 31 counties and one independent city; 28 in what would become West Virginia and 3 counties and the city of Alexandria that were to be left in Virginia. Candidates for the primary offices ran unopposed; Francis H. Pierpont for governor, Daniel Polsely for Lt. Governor and James S. Wheat for attorney general.

In anticipation of the relocation of the Restored Government to Alexandria from Wheeling as West Virginia statehood approached Francis Pierpont once again ran for governor of Virginia on May 28, 1863. Although no county returns have been found he received 3,755 votes, with the city of Alexandria reporting 179 votes for Pierpont.

=== Military ===
One of the obligations of the Restored Government, as the Federally recognized state government of Virginia, was to provide Virginia's share of the military quotas. As most of Virginia was controlled from Richmond this proved to be difficult. After his first military successes in the region Brig. Gen. George B. McClellan informed Gov. Pierpont that he would not be in the region much longer and that Pierpont would need to recruit sufficient men to defend it. He told Pierpont that he saw no enthusiasm for enlisting.

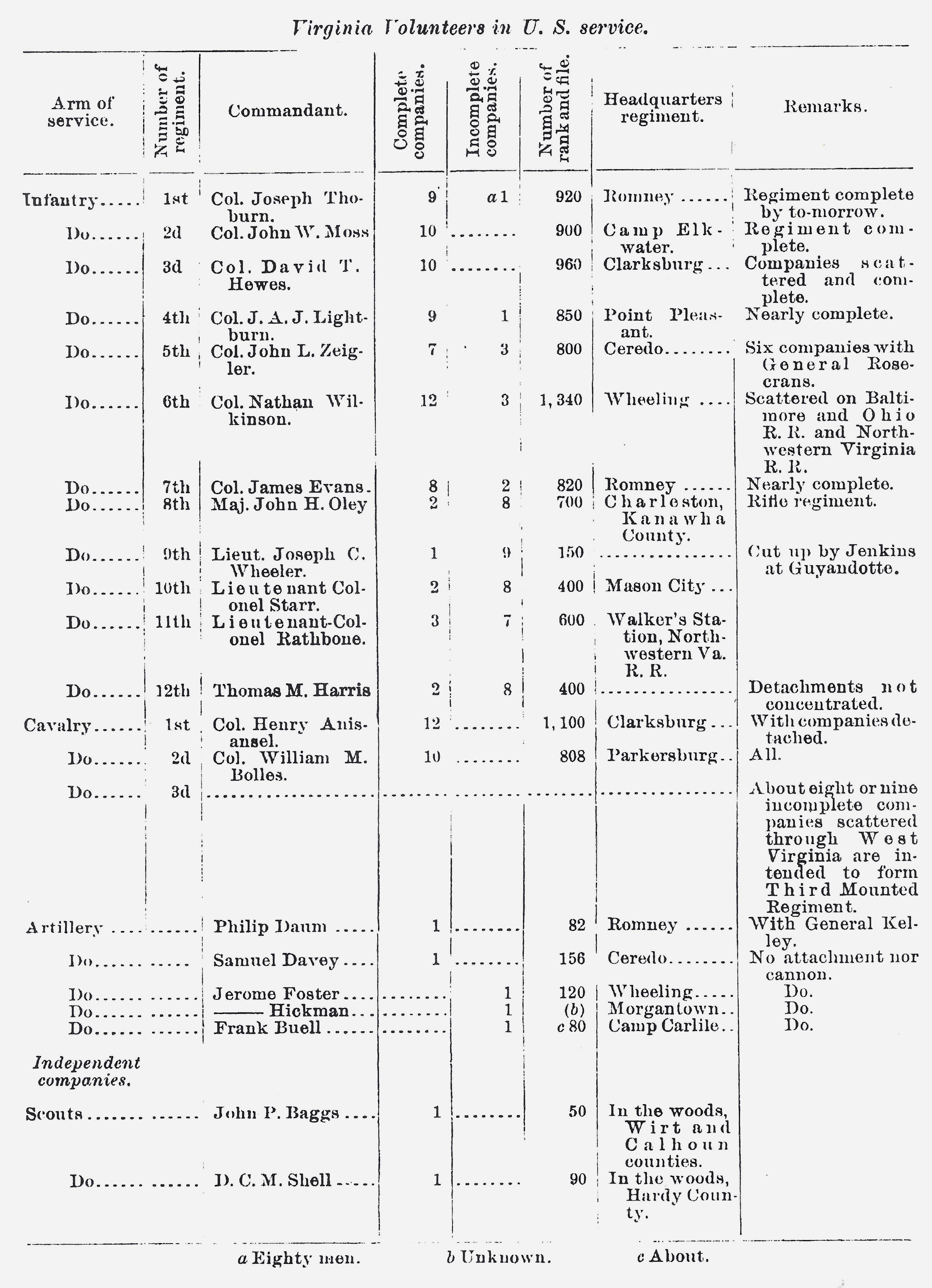
Virginia Union regiments, Nov. 20, 1861

The Union regiments recruited in 1861 under the Restored Government contained a large number of Pennsylvania and Ohio men who had not been accepted in their states' first call. The 2nd West Virginia Cavalry had originally been an Ohio regiment that had not been accepted by their state and chose to volunteer as "Virginians". Agents in Pennsylvania and Ohio were active in finding men for the Wheeling regiments. As the demand on those states for more men increased there was less willingness by them to allow their men to go elsewhere. The Ohio adjutant general, Catharinus P. Buckingham, wrote to Pierpont on Sept. 13, 1861, saying "Your permit for raising regiments from Ohio embarrasses us severely...it injures the cause greatly & will not help Virginia but only postpone assistance from Ohio... Whitelaw Reid estimated that Ohio alone contributed large parts of 5 regiments to Virginia recruitment. Aside from out-of-state recruits western Virginia raised about 20,-22,000 men for Federal service and an equal number for Confederate service. The Union regiments were designated "Virginia" until West Virginia statehood and the designation changed to "West Virginia". On Nov. 20, 1861, the adjutant-general of the Restored Government, Henry J. Samuels, sent a roster of regiments and recruits to the adjutant-general of the U.S. Army.

The western Virginia militia system fell apart on Virginia's secession. Most of the militia organizations in the northwestern part of the state refused the call of Gov. Letcher, though some, like most of the Jackson County militia, refused to organize as a Union militia. In the southern and eastern counties that became West Virginia, the militias generally assembled on Letcher's call, many of them eventually entering Confederate service. The organization of the Union militia was not very effective and after the war Gov. Boreman called for a restructure of state militia.

== Government in Alexandria ==
Following West Virginia's statehood in June 1863, the Restored Government of Virginia relinquished authority over the northwestern counties now forming the new 35th state, and thus lost most of its area not under Confederate military control. Pierpont then moved the Restored Government from Wheeling to Alexandria, effective August 26, 1863. Located in northeast Virginia proper, across the Potomac River from Washington, the city of Alexandria remained under Union control for most of the war since May 1861. The Restored Government claimed legitimacy over all of the Commonwealth of Virginia not now incorporated into the new State of West Virginia. Rather than recognize the Confederate state government in Richmond, Pierpont had characterized it as "large numbers of evil-minded persons [that] have banded together in military organizations with intent to overthrow the Government of the State; and for that purpose have called to their aid like-minded persons from other States, who, in pursuance of such call, have invaded this Commonwealth." But outside the few jurisdictions that Pierpont's government administered under Federal military and naval arms along the Potomac River and around the Hampton Roads harbor and along the Chesapeake Bay, control of the state was mostly in rebel Richmond, for instance, in collecting taxes. Furthermore, Federal military authorities consistently enforced martial law in those regions of the state under Union military control, which was for all intents and purposes the whole of the state not under rebel control. The imposition of martial law further limited the Restored Government's actual civil authority.

The Restored Government's loss of authority had direct consequences for Pierpont's own political career. He was born in West Virginia, firmly identified as a West Virginian and had hoped to become Governor of the new state. However, there were very few suitably qualified Unionists with ties to a locale within the Commonwealth's reduced borders and none who expressed interest in replacing Pierpont to become essentially a figurehead chief executive. Therefore, Pierpont reluctantly agreed to continue to head the Restored Government in Alexandria while Arthur I. Boreman became the first Governor of West Virginia. In this role, Pierpont ensured the Restored Government would continue to assert its authority over the remainder of the Commonwealth and conduct whatever business it could. As had been (and continued to be) case with respect to dual representation in the Wheeling and Richmond assembles, several Virginia localities not claimed by West Virginia sent representatives to both the rival Alexandria and Richmond state legislatures.

The Restored Government adopted a new Virginia constitution in 1864 by declaration (rather than by popular vote as delegate John Hawxhurst of Fairfax County, Virginia had advocated). It recognized the creation of West Virginia, abolished slavery, and disqualified supporters of the Confederacy from voting. The constitution was effective only in the Union-controlled areas of Virginia: several northern Virginia counties, the Norfolk / Portsmouth / Hampton areas around Hampton Roads, and the Eastern Shore of the Chesapeake.

On February 9, 1865 the legislature of the Restored Government voted for the adoption of the Thirteenth Amendment to the United States Constitution, which abolished slavery in the United States.

== Government moves to Richmond ==
After the fall of Richmond and the end of the Civil War in May 1865, the executive officers moved the government from Alexandria to Richmond, which the Restored Government had always considered to be its official capital. The government operating under the Constitution of 1864 thereafter assumed civil authority for the entire Commonwealth of Virginia, until adoption of the Constitution of 1869. Some West Virginians expressed concern that once restored to the Union the government of Virginia might seek to challenge the validity of the authority the Restored Government possessed in consenting to West Virginia's admission to the Union. To alleviate these concerns, the Congress set as a condition for Virginia's readmission to Congress that it affirm in its 1869 Constitution that the authority by which the State of West Virginia was created out of Virginia territory had indeed been valid, thus giving its consent to the creation of West Virginia retroactively to 1863.

== Officers of the Restored Government ==
Governor

- Francis Harrison Pierpont (1861–1865)

Lieutenant Governors

- Daniel Polsley (1861–1863)
- Leopold Copeland Parker Cowper (1863–1865)

Attorneys General

- James S. Wheat (1861–1863)
- Thomas Russell Bowden (1863–1865)

== See also ==
- West Virginia in the American Civil War
- Virginia in the American Civil War
- Eastern Theater of the American Civil War
- The two Virginia gubernatorial elections of 1863: the Union one and the Confederate one
- Virginia Constitutional Convention of 1868, which set the stage for Virginia's readmission to Congress

=== Other Civil War governments-in-exile ===
- The Confederate government of Kentucky
- The Confederate government of Missouri
- For the presumptive Unionist government in East Tennessee, see East Tennessee Convention
