= Robert E. Cowan =

American politician

Member of the Virginia House of Delegates from the Preston district
- In office December 7, 1857 – March 31, 1863 Serving with J. C. Kemble, John Scott
- Preceded by: John A. F. Martin
- Succeeded by: n/a

Member of the Virginia House of Delegates from the Preston County, Virginia district
- In office September 7, 1893 – March 15, 1865 Serving with Charles J. P. Cresap
- Preceded by: n/a
- Succeeded by: n/a

Personal details
- Born: March 26, 1830 Staunton, Virginia, US
- Died: July 14, 1887 (aged 57) St. Louis, Missouri, US
- Spouse: Susan Louisa Cresap
- Profession: Lawyer, judge

Military service
- Allegiance: Confederate States
- Branch/service: Virginia Militia; Confederate States Army
- Rank: Captain(CSA)

Robert Edwin Cowan (November 9, 1830 – July 14, 1887) was a Virginia lawyer and politician who served in the Virginia House of Delegates and the Virginia Secession Convention of 1861 and as a Confederate officer. After the American Civil War, he moved to Kansas City, Missouri, where he resumed his legal practice and was elected a judge before his death and burial in St. Louis.

== Early and family life ==
Descended from the First Families of Virginia, Robert Cowen was born in Staunton, Virginia, on November 9, 1830, to Arthur Cowan and his wife, the former Elizabeth Floyd who married in Monongalia County, Virginia, on August 9, 1829. Cowen's ancestors had moved from northern Ireland to Pennsylvania early in the 18th century, and by the American Revolutionary War were attempting to settle in the Shenandoah and Clinch River valleys. They had at least three sons—Robert E. Cowen, John T. Cowen and James P. Cowen—and many grandchildren.

Robert E. Cowen married the former Susan Louisa Cresap, whose ancestors had explored and settled in the Appalachian foothills of Pennsylvania, Maryland and Virginia and whose grandfather Thomas Cresap also fought for independence in the American Revolutionary War. Their children included Arthur Cresap Cowan (1858–1927), Charles Perry Cowan (1860–1902), Robert Cowan (1862–) and Ada Lee Cowan Woodson (1866–1953).

== Career ==
After admission to the Virginia bar, Cowen became a clerk in the Virginia General Assembly. While the legislature was not in session, Cowan lived and practiced in Kingwood the county seat of Preston County (in what became West Virginia after the American Civil War).

Beginning in 1857, Preston County voters elected Cowen as one of two men to represent them (part-time) in the Virginia House of Delegates. He first won election alongside J. C. Kemble in 1857, and re-election in 1859 alongside John Scott (Virginia), and during most of the American Civil War served as that county's only delegate in Richmond.

Months after the Virginia Secession Convention expelled Unionists William G. Brown (a former Virginia General Assembly delegate and U.S. Congressman) and James Clark McGrew on June 29, 1861, because of the Wheeling Convention that May (in which many men from Preston County but not they, participated), five men from Preston County at a Confederate camp in Pocahontas County on October 24, 1861, elected this Robert E. Cowan (another Confederate officer of the same name and distantly related, but from Russell County, Virginia would die months later) to replace Brown, and his brother-in-law and newly admitted lawyer Charles J. P. Cresap to replace McGrew. During the Civil War, Cowan left Preston County and moved to Richmond, where in addition to his part-time legislative service, Cowan served as a captain, assistant commissary and subsistence officer. Major A.G. Regar recommended him for the job, and he was appointed on January 26, 1862, as of January 18. Reassigned on June 5, 1863, as the ACS was disbanded, Cowan then applied to become 3rd auditor in the post office on December 23, 1863, and to become a clerk in the Treasury Department on April 9, 1864. Cowan was the only delegate representing Preston County (part-time) in Richmond between 1861 and mid-1863. Beginning on September 7, 1863, until the war's end, he and Charles J. P. Cresap both represented Preston County in the House of Delegates in Richmond.

== Postwar Missouri years ==
After the war, Cowan moved his family (and sister-in-law Mary Cresap) to Kansas City, Missouri, where he practiced law together with former CSA Major Blake L. Woodson (b. 1835), formerly of Roanoke, Virginia, and who had studied under John Brockenbrough in Lexington, Virginia. In 1884 Kansas City voters elected Woodson their prosecuting attorney and re-elected him in 1886. Their legal partnership had continued until Cowan was elected a judge (and Woodson would later become a judge).

== Death and legacy ==
Judge Cowan died in St. Louis, Missouri, on July 14, 1887. By then, his son Arthur had moved to Jacksonville, Florida, but Charles and Ada Lee remained with their widowed mother.
