= George R. Latham =

American politician

George Robert Latham
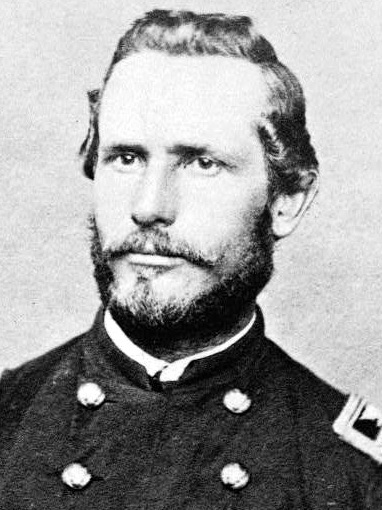

Member of the U.S. House of Representatives from West Virginia's 2nd district
- In office March 4, 1865 – March 3, 1867
- Preceded by: William G. Brown
- Succeeded by: Bethuel Kitchen

Personal details
- Born: March 9, 1832 Haymarket, Virginia, US
- Died: December 16, 1917 (aged 85) Buckhannon, West Virginia, US
- Party: Union
- Profession: Politician, lawyer

George Robert Latham (March 9, 1832 – December 16, 1917) was a 19th-century Virginia farmer, lawyer and politician who helped found the state of West Virginia during the American Civil War, during which he served as a colonel in the Union Army. He later served one term in the United States House of Representatives representing West Virginia's 2nd congressional district (1864-1866), as well as became U.S. Consul in Melbourne, Australia (1867-1870) before returning to West Virginia to farm and hold various civic offices.

== Early and family life ==
Born near Haymarket, Virginia, on March 9, 1832, Latham received an education suited to his class, then read law.

In 1857 in Taylor County, Latham married the former Caroline Thayer, daughter of blacksmith Franklin Thayer, who had been born in Massachusetts but married Virginian Nancy Mason and raised their children in Virginia. In the 1860 census, Latham's young family in Grafton in Taylor County also included Caroline's 15-year-old sister and two printers, presumably boarders. By 1870, Franklin Taylor was incapacitated and had moved from Boothsville in Marion County to Pruntytown in Taylor County (at the intersection of the Northwestern Turnpike and the Beverly/Fairmont Road), and was the head of a household which consisted of his wife, three sons (including West Virginia infantry veteran Franklin T. Thayer) and another daughter, as well as George and Caroline Latham and their by then five children. The Lathams would have eight children. Franklin Thayer's great-grandfather, Capt. Abel Thayer, had been a patriot during the American Revolutionary War who had raised the alarm at Lexington and fought to defend Boston.

== Career ==
Latham crossed the Appalachian Mountains as a young man, was admitted to the Virginia bar in 1859, and began his legal practice in Grafton, Taylor County, Virginia (now West Virginia), a booming railroad town where the Baltimore and Ohio Railroad connected with the Northwestern Virginia Railroad. By 1860, he was publishing a weekly newspaper, the Western Virginian with a motto "the Constitution, the Union and the Enforcement of the Laws" and which endorsed the Constitutional Union Party's presidential ticket of John Bell of Tennessee and Edward Everett of Massachusetts.

Latham soon commanded the local militia, the Grafton Guards. When, contrary to the wishes of western Virginia delegates, the Virginia Secession Convention of 1861 voted for secession on April 17 and various Virginia militia units seized the federal arsenal at Harpers Ferry the following day, Latham and his Grafton Guards protected their railroads. The Clarksburg Resolution called for western Virginians to meet at Wheeling on May 13, 1861, before the vote, and Latham became active Taylor County's primary for delegates to the Wheeling Convention. Days after Virginians (over the opposition of western Virginians) voted to secede from the Union on May 23, Latham and his Grafton Guards took the train to Wheeling, where they became Company B of the 2nd West Virginia Infantry Regiment.

Thus, Latham began serving in the Union Army as captain. He was promoted to colonel commanding the regiment with a commission date of May 24, 1862, and was still colonel when the regiment became known as the 2nd West Virginia Mounted Infantry Regiment. Effective January 26, 1864, the regiment was converted to the 5th West Virginia Cavalry Regiment. Latham was court-martialed for neglect of duty in allowing the B&O railroad's New Creek Station to be captured by Confederates in November 1864 with almost no resistance. Although convicted and sentenced to be dismissed from the service, perhaps because senior authorities recognized the number of times the station changed hands and the size of the raiding force, Latham nonetheless returned to duty and was brevetted brigadier general on March 13, 1865, days after the court martial conviction was reversed and shortly before he was honorably discharged.

West Virginia voters elected Latham a Unionist to the United States House of Representatives in 1864, and he served from 1865 to 1867, but did not seek re-election. Instead, he accepted an appointment consul at Melbourne, Australia in 1867, returning to West Virginia in 1870. Latham then briefly lived with his elderly father-in-law and relatives before moved to Buckhannon, the county seat of Upshur County, West Virginia, where he farmed as well as served as school superintendent from 1875 to 1877, Latham also supervised a district of the United States Census for the 10th Census (the first census division of West Virginia).

== Death and legacy ==
Latham died in Buckhannon, West Virginia on December 16, 1917. He was interred in Heavner Cemetery in Buckhannon.

U.S. House of Representatives
Preceded by William G. Brown Sr.	Member of the U.S. House of Representatives from West Virginia's 2nd congressional district March 4, 1865 – March 3, 1867	Succeeded by Bethuel Kitchen
