= Bethuel Kitchen =

American politician

Bethuel Middleton Kitchen
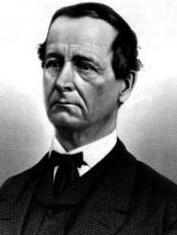

Member of the U.S. House of Representatives from West Virginia's 2nd district
- In office March 4, 1867 – March 3, 1869
- Preceded by: George R. Latham
- Succeeded by: James McGrew

Member of the West Virginia Senate
- In office 1865–1866

Personal details
- Born: March 21, 1812 Ganotown, Virginia, US (now West Virginia)
- Died: December 15, 1895 (aged 83) Shanghai, West Virginia, US
- Party: Republican
- Other political affiliations: Union, Greenback
- Profession: Politician, Farmer

Bethuel Middleton Kitchen (March 21, 1812 – December 15, 1895) was a nineteenth-century politician from Virginia and West Virginia.

== Biography ==
Born in Ganotown, Virginia (now West Virginia), Kitchen attended common schools as a child and later engaged in agricultural pursuits and stock raising. He was a Republican member of the Virginia House of Delegates in 1861 and 1862 under the Restored Government of Virginia. On May 28, 1863, Kitchen was elected from Virginia's 7th District to the United States House of Representatives. He presented his credentials as a member-elect to the 38th United States Congress in December 1863, but was not permitted a seat because voting had been limited in the war-torn counties of the 7th District.

On October 27, 1864, Kitchen was elected to the 3rd and 4th West Virginia State Senate, serving two sessions in 1865 and 1866. In 1866, Kitchen was elected from West Virginia's 2nd District to the United States House of Representatives, serving in the 40th United States Congress from 1867 to 1869. Afterward, he resumed engagements in agricultural pursuits and stock raising and became president of the Agricultural and Mechanical Association of Berkeley, Jefferson and Morgan counties, serving from 1869 to 1875. Kitchen was master of the West Virginia State Grange from 1873 to 1879. In October 1878, Kitchen was elected as a Greenback Party candidate to the 14th West Virginia House of Delegates, which convened from January through March 1879. Kitchen was president of the Berkeley County, West Virginia court from 1880 to 1895.

Kitchen died at his home, "Valley View", in Shanghai, West Virginia, on December 15, 1895.

Kitchen's son Joseph Garrison Kitchen was a delegate to the 19th West Virginia Legislature in 1889.

== Civil War ==
On May 13, 1861, Unionist citizens met at Martinsburg, West Virginia (then Virginia) and nominated Kitchen and Christian M. Shaffer to the General Assembly of the Restored Government of Virginia in Alexandria, Virginia.

In a petition dated December 28, 1863, Kitchen and other Unionist citizens of Berkeley County requested that President Abraham Lincoln reinstate General Robert H. Milroy to command of Federal troops in the Shenandoah Valley. Milroy had been reassigned after a delayed retreat and defeat by Confederate Lieutenant General Richard S. Ewell at the Second Battle of Winchester on June 15, 1863. Despite Milroy's loss at Winchester, Unionist citizens in the area preferred his command and noted increased attacks by Confederate units after Milroy's reassignment.

On January 31, 1864, Kitchen's home in Shanghai, West Virginia, was attacked by a Confederate guerrilla unit. Kitchen and his son Joseph Garrison Kitchen threatened the soldiers with revolvers after they entered the house. Kitchen's daughter sneaked onto a second-story porch and played a bugle call, convincing the Confederates that Federal cavalry were approaching. After the Confederates fled, Kitchen quickly left Berkeley County and returned to the congressional session in Washington, DC. This incident was later cited by the House Committee of Elections as evidence of the wartime conditions found in Berkeley County and other border counties in the 7th District. These conditions were attributed to disrupting the election process in the area.

On October 1, 1864, Kitchen chaired a Union meeting at Martinsburg, West Virginia. The Unionist citizens adopted a set of resolutions denouncing slavery and endorsing the reelection of Abraham Lincoln. During the 1864 presidential election, the "Unionist" label was adopted by the Republican Party to show unity with "War Democrats" who opposed the Confederacy.

== Contested election - Lewis McKenzie vs. B.M. Kitchen ==
On May 28, 1863, Kitchen was elected from Virginia's 7th District to the United States House of Representatives. Kitchen defeated runner-up Lewis McKenzie of Alexandria, Virginia, by a vote of 962 to 716. In December 1863, Kitchen presented his credentials as a member-elect to the 38th United States Congress. When Congress convened on December 7, no representatives from Virginia were present at roll call.

On December 23, 1863, runner-up Lewis McKenzie contested the election on the grounds that a majority (730) of Kitchen's votes had come from Berkeley County, Virginia, which simultaneously voted to join the new state of West Virginia on May 28, 1863. In the other counties that remained in the 7th District, Kitchen only received 232 votes. McKenzie argued that Berkeley County votes should be ineligible in Virginia's 7th District election because Berkeley County was no longer in the 7th District or the state of Virginia. McKenzie also alleged misconduct in reporting Berkeley County's election results. Since the Berkeley County clerk's office had been vacated due to the war, Berkeley County polling commissioners had instead reported election results to the county clerk in Alexandria, Virginia, the seat of the Restored Government of Virginia.

On February 8, 1864, the House Committee of Elections, led by Henry L. Dawes, presented a report and two resolutions declaring that neither McKenzie nor Kitchen were entitled to a seat. Green Clay Smith presented a minority report. On February 26, 1864, McKenzie presented his case. Dawes discredited McKenzie's claims regarding the legitimacy of the Berkeley County election and irregularities in the reporting process. Berkeley County's participation in the Virginia election was ruled valid, due to West Virginia not fully accepting Berkeley County's admittance until August 5, 1863, more than two months after the May 28 election. The House passed the resolution that Lewis McKenzie was not entitled to the seat under any circumstances due to lack of votes. Dawes presented the committee's reasons for the resolution against Kitchen's eligibility as well. Green Clay Smith asked for the resolution to be struck out. The majority report declared that voting in most 7th District counties had been disrupted so badly by the war that many citizens had not been able to vote. Due to the lack of consistent voting throughout the district, the report concluded that the seat should remain vacant as no candidate could be determined to represent the choice of the majority of the district.

On April 16, 1864, Green Clay Smith presented a minority report in defense of Kitchen's eligibility. Smith noted other elections with lower percentages of voter turnout. He cited a lack of evidence that citizens were prevented from voting, and the difficulty in determining why citizens failed to vote. Finally, Smith reasoned that it was not moral to deny representation for the citizens who did vote under wartime conditions, and the majority of votes cast were for Kitchen. Dawes countered this report with statements Kitchen had given regarding entire counties that had been under rebel control and did not hold elections. Dawes also noted that while Berkeley County had legally been part of Virginia on the day of the election, the county was in the process of being transferred to West Virginia and its votes for Kitchen did not represent the majority of Virginia's 7th District. Therefore, the House passed the committee's resolution that Kitchen was not entitled to a seat, but also dismissed McKenzie's claim. Kitchen was afforded mileage and pay to the date of this resolution. The 7th District seat remained vacant for the duration of the 38th Congress.

U.S. House of Representatives
Preceded by George R. Latham	Member of the U.S. House of Representatives from West Virginia's 2nd congressional district March 4, 1867 – March 3, 1869	Succeeded by James McGrew
