= Thomas Haymond =

American politician

Thomas Sherwood Haymond (January 15, 1794 – April 5, 1869) was a lawyer and United States Congressman (1849–51) from Western Virginia (now West Virginia).

== Biography ==
The grandson of Major William Haymond, Haymond was born in 1794 in Fairmont, West Virginia to William Haymond Jr. and Cynthia Carroll. He attended private schools as a child and went on to attend the College of William and Mary. He served as a private in the War of 1812, studied law and was admitted to the bar in 1815, commencing practice in Morgantown. He was president of the county court of the newly formed Marion County in 1842 before being elected as a Whig to the United States House of Representatives to fill a vacancy in 1849, serving until 1851.

Haymond was a brigadier general in the Virginia Militia and, at the outbreak of the Civil War in 1861, entered the Confederate Army as a colonel, serving throughout the war.

Haymond died in Richmond, Virginia, on April 5, 1869, and was interred in Palatine Cemetery near Fairmont.

U.S. House of Representatives
Preceded by Alexander Newman	Member of the U.S. House of Representatives from Virginia's 15th congressional district November 8, 1849 – March 4, 1851 (obsolete district)	Succeeded by George W. Thompson
