= John Hagans =

American politician (1838–1900)

John Marshall Hagans
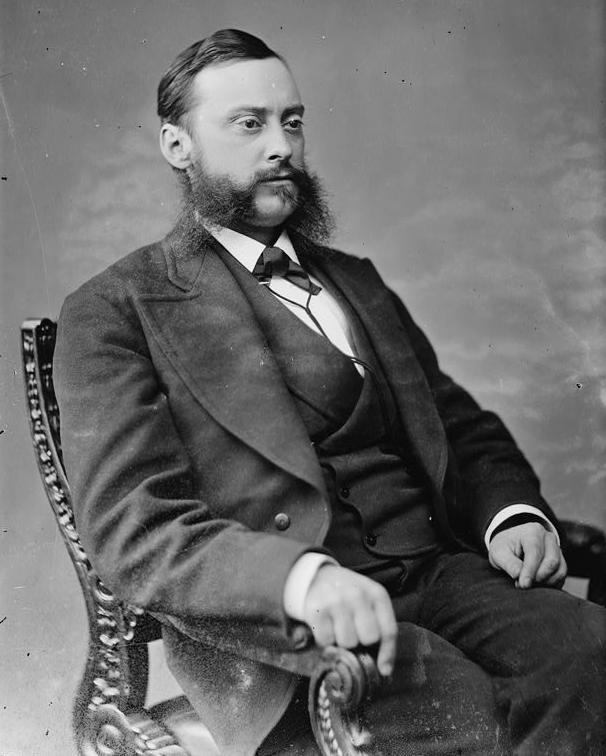

Member of the U.S. House of Representatives from West Virginia's 2nd district
- In office March 4, 1873 – March 3, 1875
- Preceded by: James McGrew
- Succeeded by: Charles J. Faulkner

Member of the West Virginia House of Delegates
- In office 1879-1883

Personal details
- Born: August 13, 1838 Brandonville, Virginia, U.S. (now Brandonville, West Virginia, U.S.)
- Died: June 17, 1900 (aged 61) Morgantown, West Virginia, U.S.
- Party: Republican
- Spouse: Sarah Barnes Willey Hagans
- Children: Lillie B. Hagans
- Profession: Politician, lawyer, judge

John Marshall Hagans (August 13, 1838 – June 17, 1900) was a nineteenth-century politician, lawyer and judge from Virginia and West Virginia.

== Early life and education ==
Born in Brandonville, Virginia (now West Virginia), Hagans attended the public schools as a child, studied law and was admitted to the bar in 1859, commencing practice in Morgantown, Virginia (now West Virginia).

== Career ==
The coat of arms of Morgantown, West Virginia, designed c. 1885 by Hagans and his daughter Lillie B. for the city's bicentennial and used until 2023.

He was elected prosecuting attorney for Monongalia County, West Virginia, in 1862, 1863, 1864 and 1870, was law reporter for the Supreme Court of Appeals of West Virginia from 1864 to 1873 and was mayor of Morgantown, West Virginia, in 1866, 1867 and 1869. Hagans was a member of the West Virginia Constitutional Convention before being elected a Republican to the United States House of Representatives in 1872, serving from 1873 to 1875, being unsuccessful for reelection. Afterwards, he was a member of the West Virginia House of Delegates from 1879 to 1883 and was elected judge of the second judicial circuit in 1888, serving until his death on June 17, 1900, in Morgantown, West Virginia. He was interred there in Oak Grove Cemetery.

== Personal life ==
He had a daughter, Lillie B. Hagans, his middle child. Together they designed the coat of arms of Morgantown, West Virginia c. 1885 for the city's bicentennial, and it was used by the city until 2023.

U.S. House of Representatives
Preceded by James McGrew	Member of the U.S. House of Representatives from West Virginia's 2nd congressional district March 4, 1873 – March 3, 1875	Succeeded by Charles J. Faulkner
