= Alexander Newman =

American politician (1804-1849)

Alexander Newman (October 5, 1804 – September 8, 1849) was an American politician from Virginia.

== Life and career ==
Born near Orange, Virginia, Newman had pursued in an academic course. He was married twice, first to Anne Maria Burwell née Brooke on February 21, 1826, and, after her death on May 15, 1836, to Eloisa Tomlinson in 1838. He had three children, Thomas Marshall Newman, William Alexander Newman and Roberta Newman to his first wife, and another son, Lewis Steenrod Newman, in 1839 to his second wife. He held several local offices before serving in the Virginia House of Delegates from 1836 to 1838 and in the Virginia Senate from 1841 to 1846. He was postmaster of Wheeling, Virginia (now West Virginia) from 1846 to 1849 and was elected in Virginia's 15th congressional district as a Democrat to the United States House of Representatives in 1848, serving from March 4, 1849 until his death on September 8, 1849, in Pittsburgh, Pennsylvania. Newman was interred in First Street Cemetery then reinterred in 1904 at Mount Rose Cemetery in Moundsville, Virginia (now West Virginia).

== See also ==
- List of members of the United States Congress who died in office (1790–1899)

U.S. House of Representatives
Preceded by William G. Brown	Member of the U.S. House of Representatives from Virginia's 15th congressional district March 4, 1849 – September 8, 1849 (obsolete district)	Succeeded by Thomas Haymond
