= Sherrard Clemens =

American politician

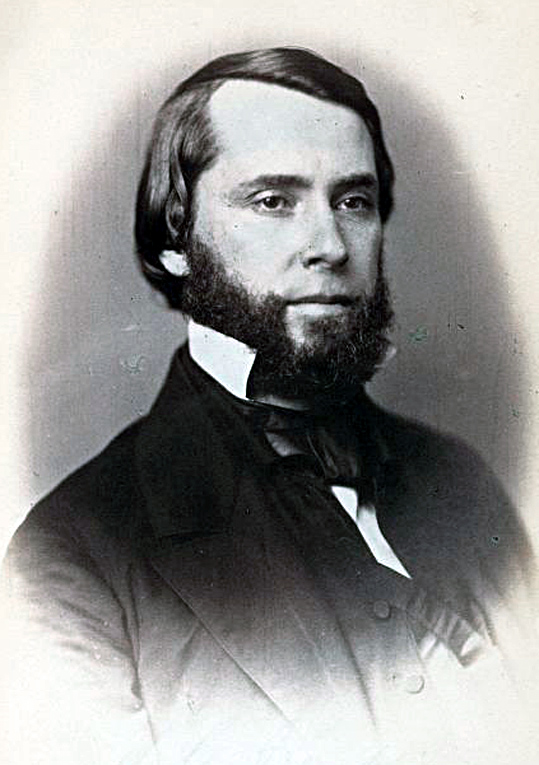
Sherrard Clemens, 1859

Sherrard Clemens (April 28, 1820 – May 30, 1880) was a politician and lawyer from Virginia and Missouri. He was a cousin to author Samuel L. Clemens (Mark Twain). The unincorporated community of Sherrard in Marshall County, West Virginia is named after him.

== Biography ==
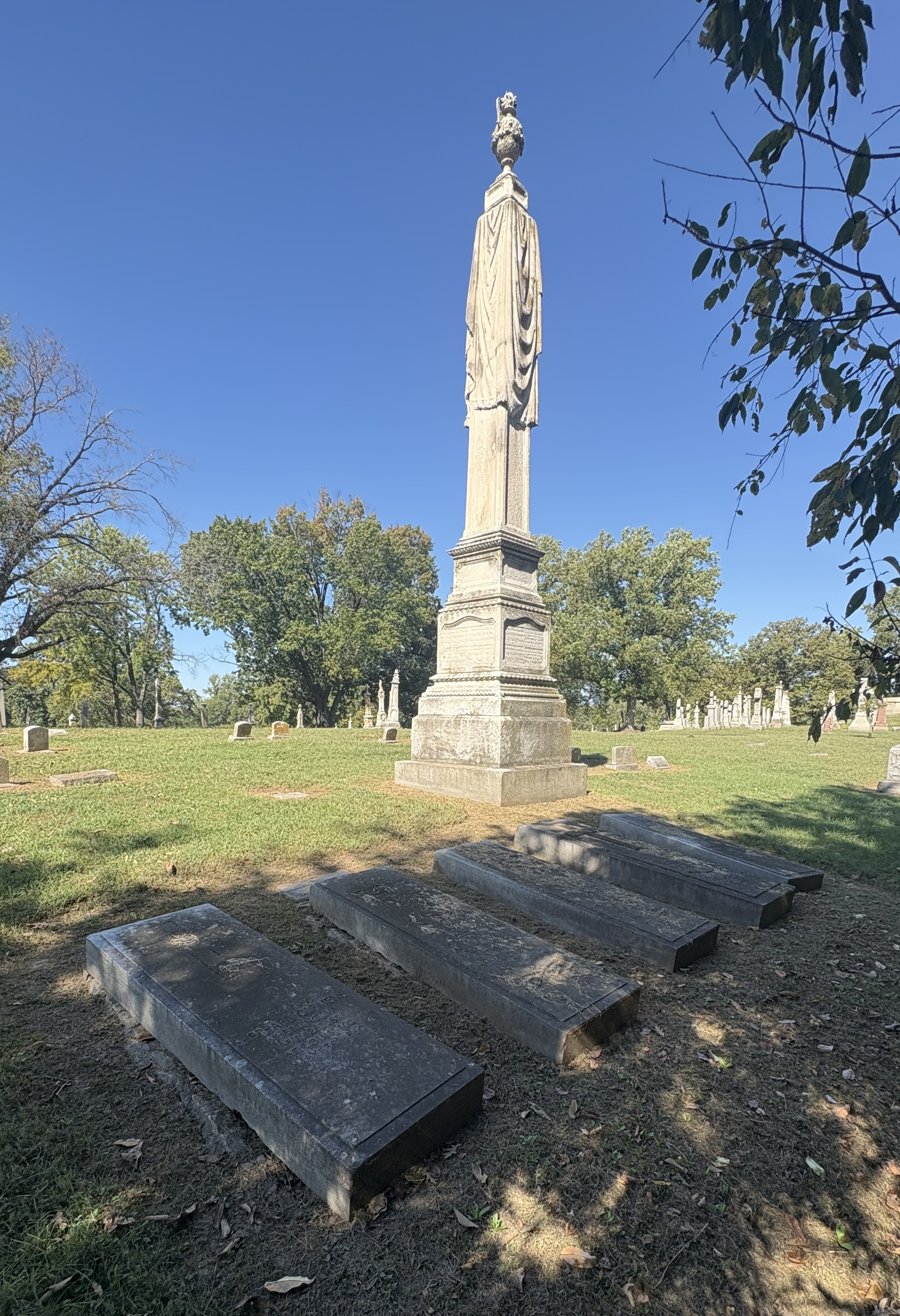
Clemens' grave at Calvary Cemetery

Born in Wheeling, Virginia (now West Virginia), Clemens was appointed a cadet to the United States Military Academy in West Point, New York, but resigned after six months. He graduated from Washington College in Washington, Pennsylvania and was admitted to the bar in 1843, commencing practice in Wheeling. He was elected a Democrat to the United States House of Representatives to fill a vacancy in 1852, serving until 1853. Clemens was later elected back to the House in 1856, serving again from 1857 to 1861.

He was not favorably impressed by Abraham Lincoln, whom he called "a cross between a sandhill crane and an Andalusian jackass." "He is vain, weak, puerile, hypocritical, without manners, without moral grace, and as he talks with you he punches you under your ribs." Clemens also wrote, "He is surrounded by a set of toad eaters and bottle holders." During the Civil War, he opposed secession. He was a member of the Virginia Convention in 1861 and afterwards resumed practicing law in Wheeling. He attended the First Wheeling Convention from May 13–15, 1861, but actively opposed the partitioning of Virginia into two states. Clemens later moved to St. Louis, Missouri, and resumed practicing law until his death there on May 30, 1880. He was interred in Calvary Cemetery in St. Louis. Mark Twain wrote of his cousin that at the time of the war he himself had been a "warm rebel" and Sherrard Clemans a Republican, but later he had temporary became a Republican and Sherrard Clemens a "warm rebel".

Clemens fought a duel with O. Jennings Wise, the son of Virginia Governor Henry A. Wise. Wise was uninjured in the duel, but Clemens received a severe injury to his right testicle.

== See also ==
- West Virginia in the Civil War

U.S. House of Representatives
| Preceded by George W. Thompson | Member of the U.S. House of Representatives from Virginia's 15th congressional district December 6, 1852 – March 4, 1853 (obsolete district) | Succeeded by (none) |
| Preceded by Zedekiah Kidwell | Member of the U.S. House of Representatives from Virginia's 10th congressional district March 4, 1857 – March 4, 1861 | Succeeded by William G. Brown |
