= William G. Brown Sr. =

American lawyer & politician (1800–1884)

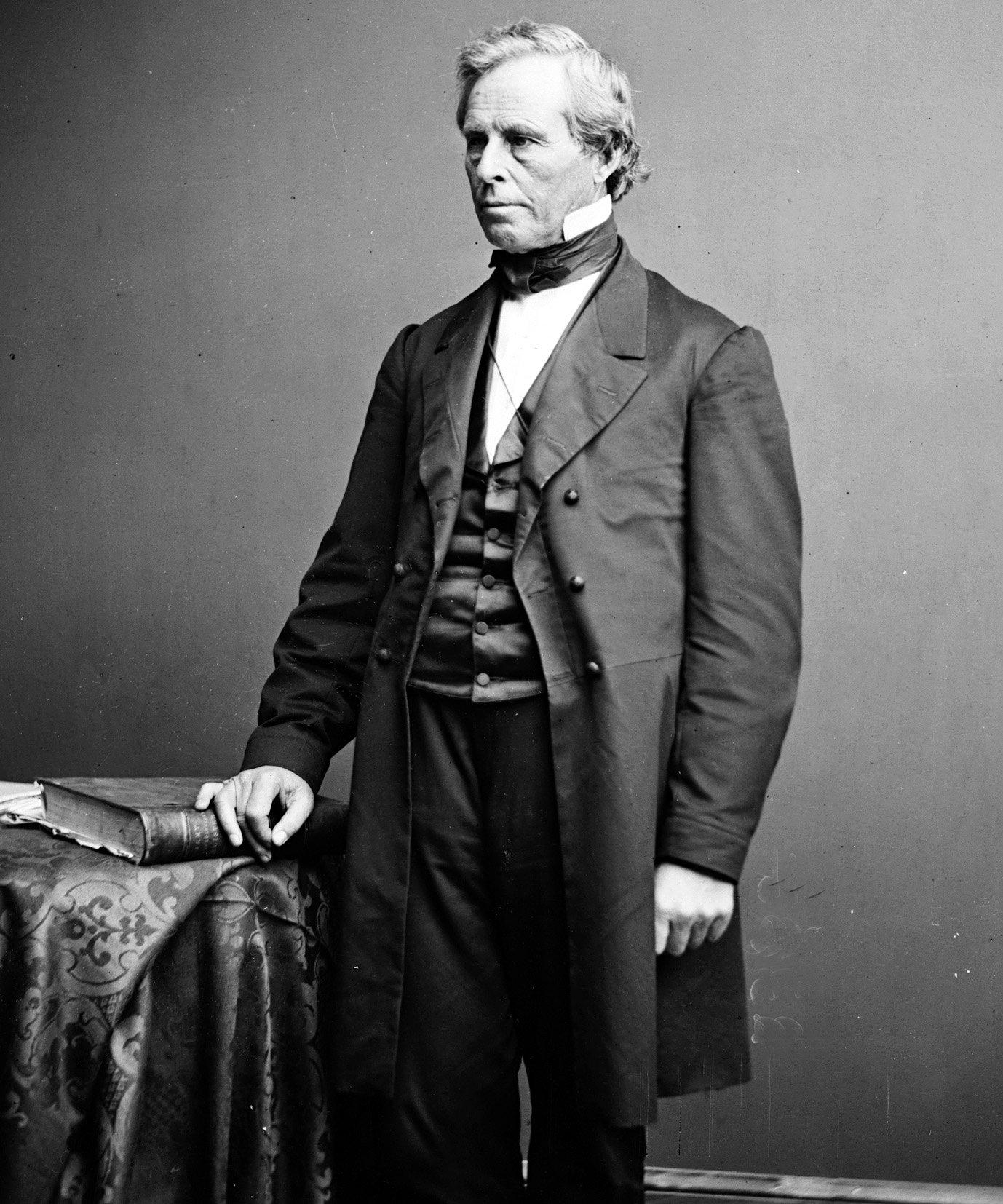

Member of the U.S. House of Representatives
- In office March 4, 1861 – March 3, 1865
- Preceded by: Sherrard Clemens
- Succeeded by: George R. Latham
- Constituency: Virginia 10th (1861–1863); West Virginia 2nd (1863–1865)
- In office March 4, 1845 – March 3, 1849
- Preceded by: Lewis Steenrod
- Succeeded by: Alexander Newman
- Constituency: Virginia 15th

Member of the Virginia House of Delegates from the Preston district
- In office December 1, 1840 – February 14, 1844
- Preceded by: William Carroll
- Succeeded by: Isaac Baldwin
- In office December 3, 1832 – December 1, 1833
- Preceded by: William B. Zinn
- Succeeded by: William Carroll

Personal details
- Born: September 25, 1800 Kingwood, Virginia (now West Virginia), U.S.
- Died: April 19, 1884 (aged 83) Kingwood, West Virginia, U.S.
- Party: Democrat; Union
- Spouse(s): Juliet Ann Roberts Byrne; Margaret P.Gay
- Children: William Gay Brown Jr.
- Profession: lawyer, politician, banker

William Gay Brown Sr. (September 25, 1800 – April 19, 1884) was a nineteenth-century politician and lawyer from Virginia, who was twice elected to the Virginia General Assembly and thrice to the U.S. House of Representatives. He also served at the Virginia Constitutional Convention of 1850 and later opposed secession at the Virginia Secession Convention of 1861. A leading Unionist during the American Civil War, he became one of the founders of West Virginia.

== Early and family life ==
Born in Kingwood, Virginia (now West Virginia), on the Northwestern Turnpike to James Brown (1761–1837), a native of Scotland and his wife. W.G. Brown received a private education appropriate to his class as a child, then read law.

On July 3, 1828, he married Juliet Ann Roberts Byrne. She died in 1851 and the widower remarried in 1855, in Monongalia County to Margaret P. Gay. Their son William Gay Brown Jr., born the following year also served in the U.S. Congress, representing West Virginia.

== Career ==
Admitted to the Virginia bar in 1823, Brown practiced in Kingwood, the Preston County seat. He owned slaves. Voters elected him the Commonwealth attorney, so he served as the county prosecutor until elected to the Virginia House of Delegates in 1832 (a part-time position). Brown lost his bid for re-election to William Carroll but in 1839 defeated Carroll and again served part-time in the House of Delegates from 1840 to 1843 (winning re-election once in the interim). In 1844 Congressman Lewis Steenrod decided not to seek re-election to the U.S. House of Representatives from Virginia's 15th congressional district, and Brown was elected to replace him. Likewise a Democrat, Brown won re-election to the United States House of Representatives and served from 1845 to 1849, being defeated in the Democratic primary of 1848 by Alexander Newman, who succeeded him.

Preston County voters nonetheless elected Brown as their delegate to the Virginia Constitutional Convention in 1850. A delegate to the Democratic National Convention in 1860 in both Charleston, South Carolina and Baltimore, Maryland, Brown was a presidential elector for losing candidate Stephen A. Douglas.

Preston county voters elected him as one of two delegates to represent them at the Virginia Secession Convention of 1861, where he spoke and voted against secession. However, after he and fellow Preston County delegate James Clark McGrew were in the minority during the second secession vote, they protested, and ultimately Preston County sent several representatives the following month to the Wheeling Convention, which wanted to remain part of the Union. On June 29, 1861, pro-secession delegates at the Virginia Convention voted to expel Brown and McGrew, although they were not actually present at the Wheeling Convention. On October 24, 1861, five Preston County men in a Confederate Camp in Pocahontas County replaced them with secessionist Preston County lawyers Charles J. P. Cresap and Robert E. Cowan.

In 1860 Congressman Sherrard Clemens of Virginia's 10th congressional district announced he would not seek re-election, although he like Brown would be elected as an anti-secessionist to the Virginia Secession Convention of 1861 (from Wheeling. Voters again elected Brown to the U.S. House, this time as a Unionist, and he served (and was seated, unlike many Virginia secessionists) from 1861 to 1863. Upon the new state of West Virginia being admitted to the Union, voters re-elected Brown, and he served for the last time in Congress representing West Virginia's 2nd congressional district from December 7, 1863 until March 3, 1865. Brown did not seek re-election as the war was ending and resumed his legal practice in Kingwood. Fellow Unionist Capt. George R. Latham succeeded him.

By 1870, Brown lived in Rowlesburg, West Virginia, Preston County's second largest town, with a major lumber industry and a Baltimore and Ohio Railroad station, and convenient access to the Cheat River. The nearby B&O viaduct is featured on the West Virginia State Seal. He continuing his legal practice in Kingwood (which remained the county seat). During at least some of this time Brown was president of a bank.

== Death and legacy ==
Brown died in Kingwood, West Virginia on April 19, 1884, and was interred there in Maplewood Cemetery. His widow remained in Kingwood until her death in 1913, and their son William Gay Brown Jr. would also represent West Virginia's 2nd congressional district for three terms until his death in 1916.

== See also ==
- West Virginia's congressional delegations

U.S. House of Representatives
Preceded by Lewis Steenrod	Member of the U.S. House of Representatives from Virginia's 15th congressional district March 4, 1845 – March 3, 1849 (obsolete district)	Succeeded by Alexander Newman
Preceded by Sherrard Clemens	Member of the U.S. House of Representatives from Virginia's 10th congressional district March 4, 1861 – March 3, 1863	Succeeded by John S. Wise^{(1)}
Preceded by (none)	Member of the U.S. House of Representatives from West Virginia's 2nd congressional district March 4, 1863 – March 3, 1865	Succeeded by George R. Latham
Notes and references
1. Because of Virginia's secession and redistricting, the House seat was vacant for twenty years before Wise succeeded Brown.
