= William B. Zinn =

American politician (1795–1875)

Member of the Virginia House of Delegates from the Preston County, Virginia district
- In office December 1, 1823 – November 28, 1824 Serving with William Sigler
- Preceded by: John Fairfax
- Succeeded by: Benjamin Jeffries, Sr.

Member of the Virginia House of Delegates from the Preston County, Virginia district
- In office December 4, 1826 – December 6, 1829 Serving with William Carroll; Benjamin Shaw; Guy R.C. Allen
- Preceded by: Benjamin Jeffries, Sr.
- Succeeded by: Benjamin Shaw

Member of the Virginia House of Delegates from the Preston County, Virginia district
- In office December 6, 1830 – December 2, 1832
- Preceded by: Guy R.C. Allen
- Succeeded by: William Gay Brown, Sr.

Member of the Virginia House of Delegates from the Preston County, Virginia district
- In office January 12, 1852 – December 3, 1855 Serving with John Scott; John A.F. Martin
- Preceded by: Buckner Fairfax
- Succeeded by: E.T. Brandon

Member of the Virginia House of Delegates from the Preston County, Virginia district
- In office 1863–1865 Serving with Charles Hooten
- Preceded by: n/a
- Succeeded by: n/a

Member of the West Virginia House of Delegates from the Preston County district
- In office January 16, 1866 – January 14, 1867
- Preceded by: William H. King
- Succeeded by: Joseph H. Gibson

Member of the West Virginia Senate from the 3rd district
- In office January 15, 1867 – January 18, 1869
- Preceded by: John S. Burdett
- Succeeded by: Jesse H. Cather

Personal details
- Born: December 6, 1795 Gladeville, Preston County, Virginia, U.S.
- Died: February 20, 1875 (aged 79) Kingwood, West Virginia, U.S.
- Occupation: farmer, miller, soldier, politician

Military service
- Allegiance: United States
- Branch/service: Virginia Militia
- Rank: Major

William B. Zinn (December 6, 1795 – February 20, 1875) was a nineteenth-century farmer, mill-owner, militia leader and politician, who ultimately freed his slaves and became one of the founders of the State of West Virginia.

== Early life ==
Born on December 6, 1795, in what was then called Gladeville, in Preston County, Virginia (but which became Kingwood, West Virginia, during his lifetime), William Zinn was born to Jacob Zinn (1773–1857) whose father had emigrated from Germany, and his second wife, Sarah "Sallie" (Byrne) Bland, the widow of Thomas Bland. He had three older half-brothers, and two younger brothers: Charles B. Zinn (1797–1863) and Peyton Zinn (1807–1860) and sisters Clara and Permelia Zinn Brown (1804–1886). He married at least twice. From his first wife ___Franklin, he inherited slaves and about $8000 in gold and other property when her parents died. His second wife was Juliet Caroline Franklin Zinn.

== Career ==
Zinn farmed and operated a mill in Preston County, which the Baltimore and Ohio Railroad reached in the mid-1950s. In the 1850 census Zinn owned 22 slaves. At some time he may have freed most, for in the 1860 census he only owned three slaves, compared to the seven slaves owned by his fellow Unionist, William Gay Brown, Sr. (who had succeeded him in the House of Delegates in 1832). Preston County voters elected Zinn to represent them, part-time, in the Virginia House of Delegates eight times. He also led the local militia, with the rank of Major.

After the Virginia Secession Convention of 1861 voted to secede from the Union over the vehement opposition of Preston County's delegates, Brown and James C. McGrew, Zinn became one of the Preston County leaders who attended the first Wheeling Convention in May 1861. Zinn served as the Convention's chairman beginning on May 13. The Secession Convention expelled Brown and McGrew on June 29, and five Preston County men voting in a Confederate camp on October 24, 1861, elected others to replace them. By contrast, Major Zinn also served as one of Preston County's representatives to the Restored Government at Wheeling, alongside Charles Hooten.

== Postwar career ==
After the war he served in the West Virginia House of Delegates for a term beginning in 1866 and then was elected to the state Senate and served until 1869. In 1870, Zinn and his wife Julie lived in Rowlesburg, a lumber and mill town that was the second largest in the county, along with two young men who worked on his farm.

== Death ==
Zinn died in Preston County on February 20, 1875, and is buried in the family cemetery in Arthurdale, West Virginia.
