= Charles J. P. Cresap =

Confederate officer and US attorney–politician

- Occupation: Lawyer
- Military career
- Allegiance: Virginia
- Branch: Confederate States Army
- Rank: Captain
- Unit: 25th Virginia Infantry Regiment
- Conflicts: American Civil War

Member of the Virginia House of Delegates from Preston County
- In office 1863–1864 Serving with Robert E. Cowan
- Governor: John Letcher; William Smith

Charles James Pindall Cresap was a Virginian attorney and politician, as well as an officer in the Confederate States Army during the American Civil War.

== Personal life ==
Charles James Pindall Cresap was born to Gus and Rhuhama Cresap, and had two siblings: a sister Mariah, and a brother Robert who died as a Confederate Army soldier at the Battle of Moorefield. After his death, Cresap's will was the subject of dispute between his widow Agnes and three other Cresaps: Gustavus J., Mary B., and Rachel R., ultimately requiring a 1904 decision by the Supreme Court of Appeals of West Virginia.

== Career ==
Cresap was a lawyer, admitted to the bar association in 1857.

=== Politics ===
Cresap replaced William G. Brown Sr. at the Virginia Secession Convention of 1861's third session in November as the representative from Preston County after the latter man was expelled on 29 June 1861. In May 1863, he was elected to the Virginia House of Delegates, representing Preston County alongside Robert E. Cowan until leaving office in 1864.

=== Military ===
For the American Civil War, Cresap sided with the Confederacy out of an allegiance to the Commonwealth of Virginia, not necessarily in opposition to the Union. Previously a second lieutenant with the Provisional Army of Virginia, Cresap enlisted with the Confederate States Army at Camp Allegheny on 1 April 1862; he was assigned to the 25th Virginia Infantry Regiment. Private Cresap was hospitalized twice as an enlisted man: once in October 1862 for fever, and again in December 1862 for diarrhea. He was promoted to sergeant on or before 1 January 1863.

Cresap requested discharge on 8 June 1863, and was released from the service on 4 August 1863. That November 20, he requested permission of the Confederate Army to be commissioned a captain and to raise a company of infantry or cavalry in northwest Virginia; this permission was granted ten days later. Cresap later requested from Jefferson Davis, the president of the Confederacy, a promotion above captain in order to command "colored troops."
