= Wheeling Convention =

1861 secession movement of West Virginia from Virginia

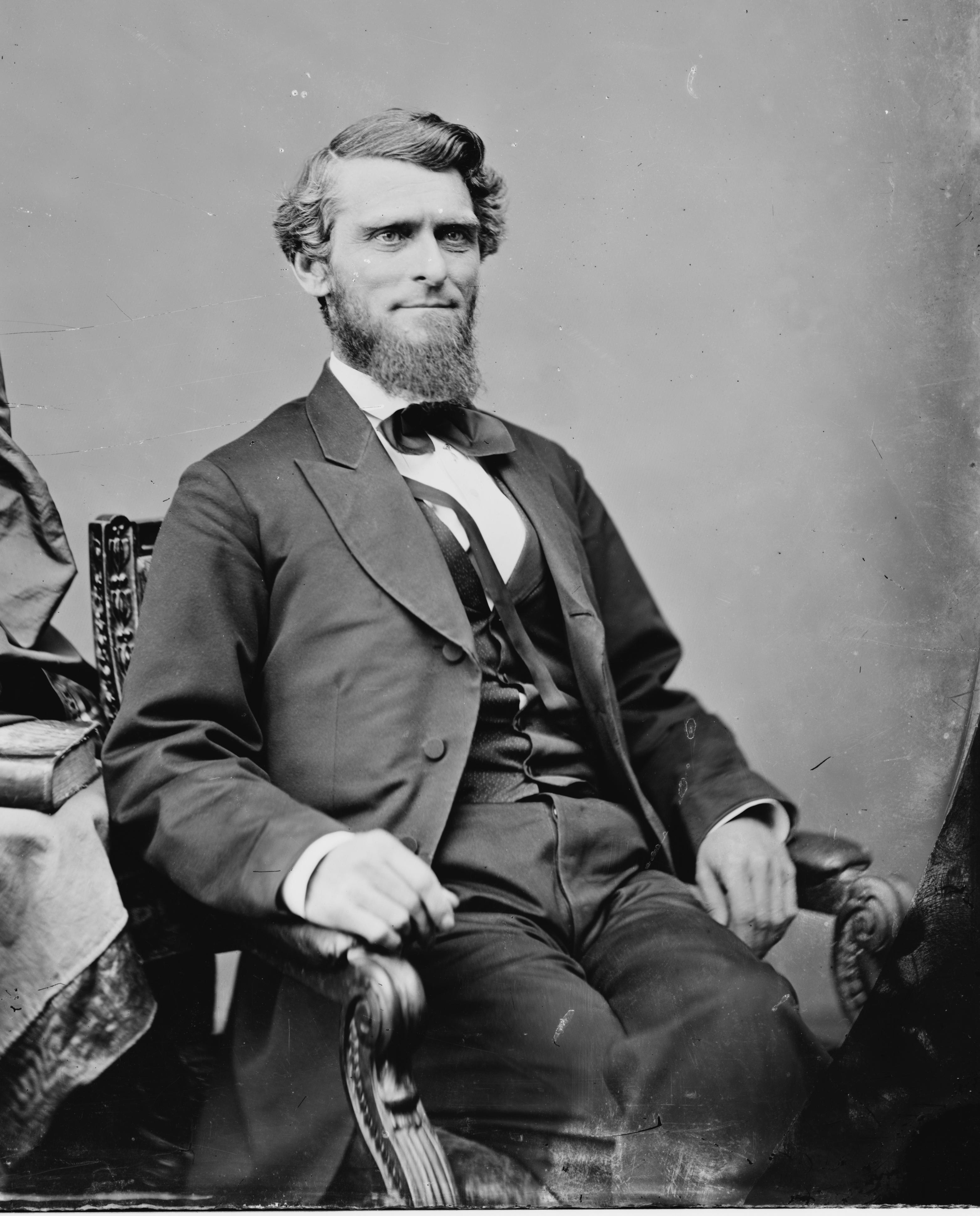
Arthur I. Boreman, 1861 Wheeling Presiding officer

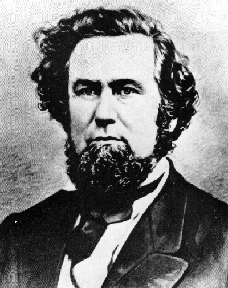
Francis H. Pierpont, elected governor of Virginia by the Convention

The 1861 Wheeling Convention was an assembly of Southern Unionist delegates from the northwestern counties of Virginia, aimed at repealing the Ordinance of Secession, which had been approved by referendum, subject to a vote.

The first of its two meetings was held before the vote, and some were keen to preempt ratification. But most preferred to elect delegates for a second meeting, should the vote go against them. When it did, the assembly formed its own Restored Government of Virginia, recognized by the federal government, and empowered to authorize the creation of a new state of West Virginia.

== First Wheeling Convention ==
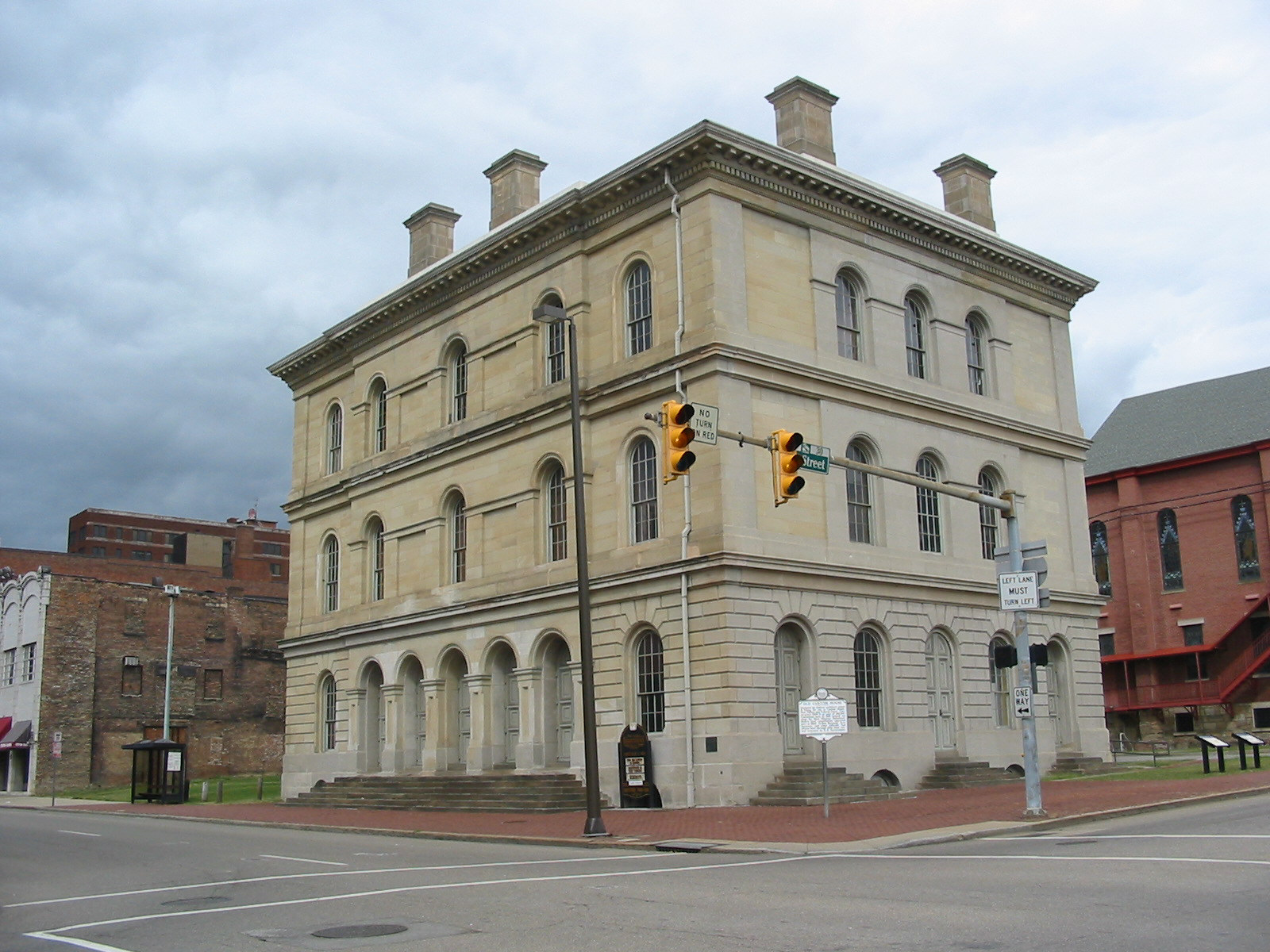
West Virginia Independence Hall

The First Wheeling Convention was held on May 13 through May 15, 1861. Twenty-seven northwestern Virginia counties were represented. Of the 429 delegates who attended, over one-third were from the area around Wheeling. Most had been chosen at public meetings, while others attended on their own initiative. William B. Zinn, who had represented Preston County many times in the Virginia General Assembly, was elected chairman. Immediately, a debate ensued over which delegates should be allowed to participate in the convention: Gen. John Jay Jackson of Wood County suggested seating all northwestern Virginians, but John S. Carlile insisted that only those who had been legitimately appointed by their constituencies be allowed to participate. Chester D. Hubbard of Ohio County ended the debate by proposing the creation of a committee on representation and permanent organization.

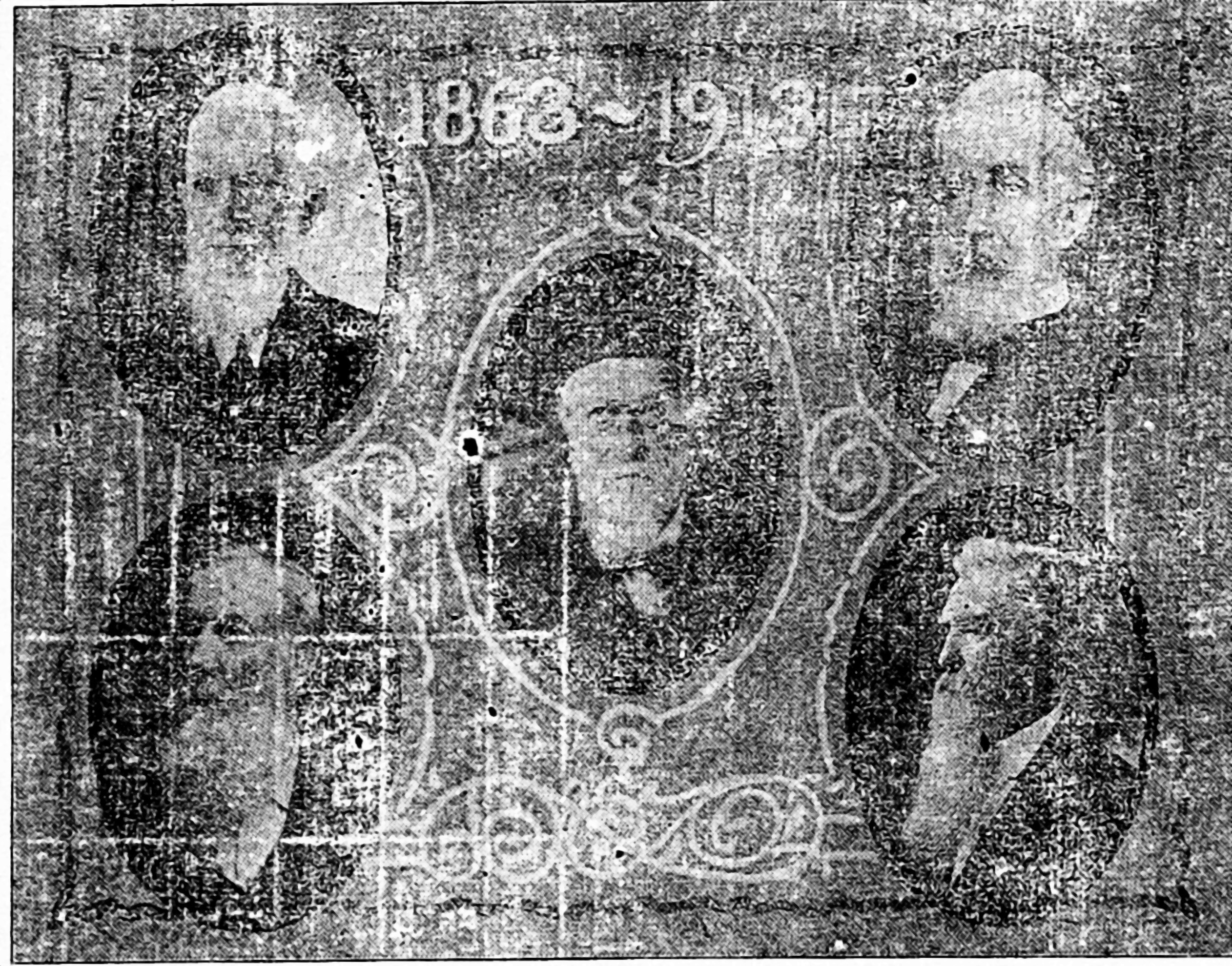
1913 photos of five survivors of the First Wheeling Convention

Some, including Jackson, argued that preemptive action against the Ordinance of Secession before it was ratified was unwise. The Ordinance of Secession would not be presented to the citizens of Virginia for a vote until May 23. Others, including Carlile, insisted on immediate action to "show our loyalty to Virginia and the Union," and on May 14, he called for a resolution creating a state of New Virginia. Waitman T. Willey responded to Carlile's plan by saying that it was "triple treason"—treason against the state of Virginia, the United States, and the Confederacy. Carlile's motion was condemned as revolutionary, and most at the convention instead supported resolutions offered by the Committee on State and Federal Resolutions, which recommended that western Virginians elect delegates to a Second Wheeling Convention to begin on June 11 if the people of Virginia approved the Ordinance of Secession.

== Second Wheeling Convention ==
=== Background and composition ===
A Second Wheeling Convention included 32 western counties, Alexandria and Fairfax County. Twenty-nine of the convention delegates were members of the Virginia General Assembly as state delegates or state senators, such as John J. Davis of Harrison County and Lewis Ruffner of Kanawha County.

Arthur I. Boreman was selected to serve as president, and he declared, "We are determined to live under a state government in the United States of America and under the Constitution of the United States."

Counties adhering to the Confederate cause either did not send representatives or were not entitled to seats. Among the more prominent not to send a delegate to the Wheeling Convention was Greenbrier County. Delegate Mason Mathews from Greenbrier County instead attended the Virginia General Assembly in Confederate Richmond.

Many of the delegates at the Convention believed that the differences between eastern and western Virginia were irreconcilable and supported some sort of separation. Where differences existed at the convention, they primarily related to how this separation should occur. Dennis Dorsey of Monongalia County called for permanent and decisive separation from eastern Virginia. Carlile, however, though he had called for a similar plan during the First Convention, persuaded the delegates that constitutional restrictions made it necessary for the formation of a loyal government of Virginia, whose legislature could then give permission for the creation of a new state.

=== Meeting and debate ===
John S. Carlile, who had represented transmontane Harrison County as an Unconditional Unionist at the Richmond Secession Convention, was the floor leader at the Second Wheeling Convention who shepherded in the creation of the Restored Virginia Government. On June 14, he expanded on his view of state and federal relations: "the people of Virginia in establishing government for themselves deemed it best to create two agents. The Federal Government is one, and the State Government is the other..." Referencing Article VI of the U.S. Constitution, Carlile observed, "Any act done or performed by the State agent in conflict with the powers conferred upon the Federal agent is to be null and void. Thus it will be seen that within the powers conferred the federal agent is supreme, independent of, and above the State agent. Hence the doctrine of Mr. [Henry] Clay when he said: 'I owe a supreme allegiance to the Federal Government, a subordinate one to my own State.' That very instrument provides for its own alteration, amendment or change. On the application of two-thirds of the principals creating it, amendments can be proposed to it and changes effected, which will become a part and parcel of the original act itself, when ratified by three-fourths of the principals through their legislatures or in their conventions assembled... But [the right of secession] was never intended..."

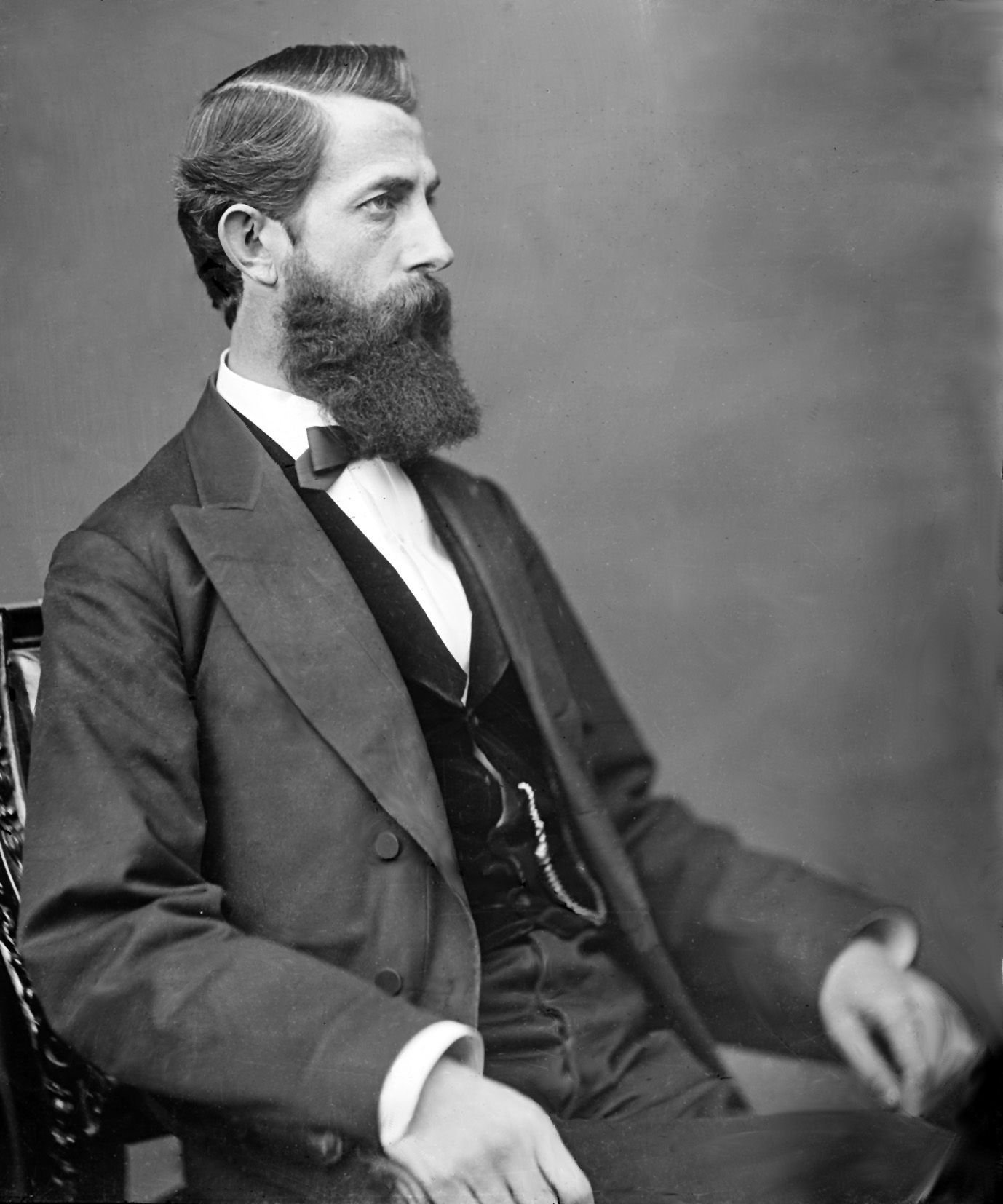
John J. Davis
Member of suspended Virginia Assembly

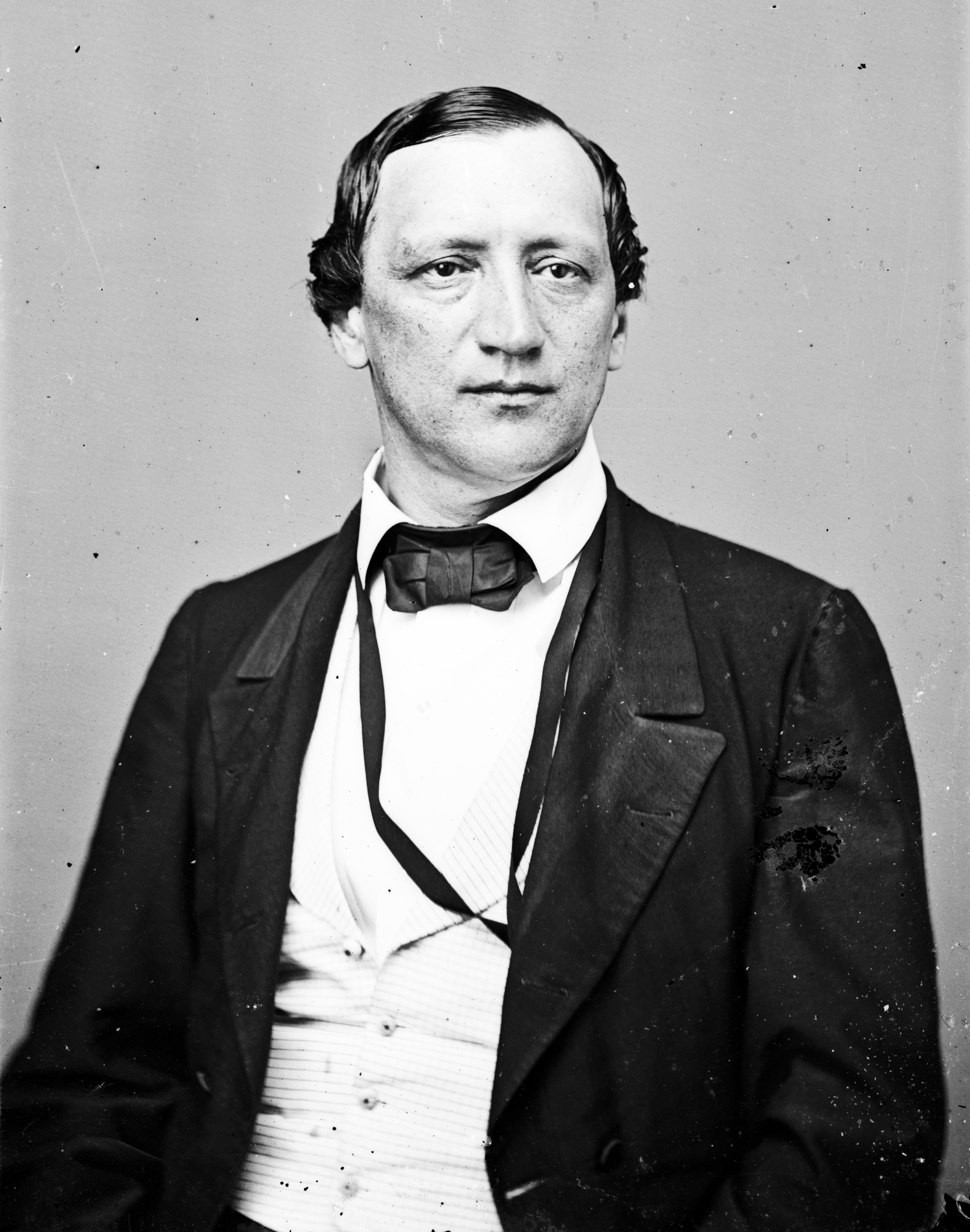
John S. Carlile
Floor leader then Virginia U.S. Senator 1861–1865

On June 17, Carlile attacked the rebellion as treason: "it is the result sir, of mature deliberation, concocted in treason, for the express purpose of breaking up constitutional liberty in this country... The plot was one that was conceived in perjury at Washington, and carried out by falsehood throughout the country, attended by coercion, intimidation, insult and a reign of terror, which was equally concerted throughout Virginia, as well as in the other Southern States." Carlile then recounted events at the Richmond Secession Convention in which he had been an Unconditional Unionist. "For several days before the Convention passed the Ordinance of Secession, it was absolutely besieged; members were threatened with being hung to the lamp posts; their lives were jeopardized; the mob was marching up and down the streets, and surrounding the Capitol, and everything was terror and dismay."

Carlile continued to impeach the legitimacy of Virginia's referendum on secession. "Immediately upon the passage of the Ordinance of Secession, in every county, as far as I can learn, a systematic reign of terror was inaugurated." Throughout the state, "irresponsible persons assembled, under the name of 'committees of safety', who [told Union men] that they must leave the State... All Union men were admonished that they would be prosecuted for treason." Carlile then described the days leading up to the referendum: " Before the day of election arrived we see the troops from South Carolina, Georgia and other Southern States, placed all over the eastern and southern parts of the States running up into the valley, and in some parts of Western Virginia. In those parts of the State freedom of election was completely suppressed, and men who dared to vote against secession done it at the hazard of their lives. Thus, sir, you see the concert by which secession has been inaugurated and carried out in Virginia; and we see that same spirit that reigned in it from the beginning... TREASON..."

=== Outcomes ===
On June 13, Carlile introduced to the convention "A Declaration of the People of Virginia." The document declared that under the Virginia Declaration of Rights, any substantial change in the form of state government had to be approved by the people via a referendum. Therefore, the Secession Convention was illegal since it had been convened by the legislature, not a referendum, and all of its acts—including the Ordinance of Secession—were ipso facto void. It also called for a reorganization of the state government, on the grounds that all state officials who had supported the Ordinance of Secession had effectively vacated their offices. On June 19, delegates approved this plan unanimously.

The next day, June 20, the convention selected new state officers for what came to be called the Restored Government of Virginia to avoid confusion with the pro-secessionist government. Francis Pierpont of Marion County was elected governor. On June 25, the convention adjourned until August 6. President Lincoln and Congress swiftly recognized the Restored Government as the legitimate government of the entire Commonwealth of Virginia.

=== Chart of delegates ===
The delegates to the Second Wheeling Convention of 1861 from counties in western and northern Virginia.

Sortable table
County	Name	Comments
Barbour	N. H. Taft	Virginia Assembly
Barbour	John H. Shuttleworth	delegate
Barbour	Spencer Dayton	delegate
Brooke	Joseph Gist	Virginia Senator
Brooke	H. W. Crothers	Virginia Assembly
Brooke	John D. Nicholls	delegate
Brooke	Campbell Tarr	delegate
Cabell	Albert Laidley	Virginia Assembly
Monongalia	Leroy Kramer	Virginia Assembly
Monongalia	Joseph Snider	Virginia Assembly
Monongalia	Ralph L. Berkshire	delegate
Monongalia	William Price	delegate
Monongalia	James Evans	delegate
Monongalia	D. B. Dorsey	delegate
Ohio	Thomas H. Logan	Virginia Assembly
Ohio	Andrew Wilson	Virginia Assembly
Ohio	Daniel Lamb	delegate
Ohio	James W. Paxton	delegate
Ohio	George Harrison	delegate
Ohio	Chester D. Hubbard	delegate
Pleasants and Ritchie	James W. Williamson	Virginia Assembly
Pleasants and Ritchie	C.W. Smith	delegate
Pleasants and Ritchie	William Douglas	delegate
Preston	Charles Hooten	Virginia Assembly
Preston	William B. Zinn	Virginia Assembly
Preston	William B. Crane	delegate
Preston	John Howard	delegate
Preston	Harrison Hagans	delegate
Preston	John J. Brown	delegate
Randolph and Tucker	Solomon Parsons	delegate
Randolph and Tucker	Samuel Crane	delegate
Taylor	Lemuel E. Davidson	Virginia Assembly
Taylor	John S. Burdett	delegate
Taylor	Samuel B. Todd	delegate
Upshur	Daniel D. T. Farnsworth	Virginia Assembly
Upshur	John L. Smith	delegate
Upshur	John Love	delegate
Wayne	William Radcliffe	Virginia Assembly
Wayne	W. W. Brumfield	delegate
Wayne	William Copley	delegate
Wetzel	James G. West	Virginia Assembly
Wetzel	Reuben Martin	delegate
Wetzel	James P. Ferrell	delegate
Wirt	James A. Williamson	Virginia Assembly
Wirt	Henry Newman	delegate
Wirt	E. T. Graham	delegate
Wood	John W. Moss	Virginia Assembly
Wood	Arthur I. Boreman	delegate
Wood	Peter G. Van Winkle	delegate
Alexandria	Henry S. Martin	delegate
Alexandria	James T. Close	delegate
Fairfax	John Hawxhurst	delegate
Fairfax	Ebenezer E. Mason	delegate
Hardy	John Michael	delegate
Hampshire	James Carskadon	Virginia Senator
Hampshire	Owen D. Downey	delegate
Hampshire	George W. Broski	delegate
Hampshire	James Trout	delegate
Hampshire	James J. Barracks	delegate
Doddridge, Tyler	William I. Boreman	Virginia Assembly
Doddridge, Tyler	Daniel D. Johnson	delegate
Doddridge, Tyler	James A. Foleyu	delegate
Gilmer	Henry H. Wither	delegate
Hancock	George McPorter	Virginia Assembly
Hancock	John H. Atkinson	delegate
Hancock	William L. Crawfore	delegate
Harrison	Chapman J. Stewart	Virginia Senator
Harrison	John J. Davis	Virginia Assembly
Harrison	John C. Vance	Virginia Assembly
Harrison	John S. Carlile	delegate
Harrison	Solomon S. Fleming	delegate
Harrison	Lot Bowen	delegate
Harrison	Benjamin Shuttleworth	delegate
Jackson	Daniel Frost	Virginia Assembly
Jackson	James F. Scott	delegate
Jackson	Andrew Flesher	delegate
Kanawha	Lewis Ruffner	Virginia Assembly
Kanawha	Greenbury Slack	delegate
Lewis	P. M. Hale	delegate
Lewis	J. A. J. Lightburn	delegate
Marion	Richard Fast	Virginia Assembly
Marion	Fontain Smith	Virginia Assembly
Marion	Francis H. Pierpont	delegate
Marion	John S. Barnes	delegate
Marion	A. F. Ritchie	delegate
Marion	James O. Watson	delegate
Marshall	Remembrance Swan	Virginia Assembly
Marshall	C. H. Caldwell	delegate
Marshall	Robert Morris	delegate
Mason	Lewis Wetzel	Virginia Assembly
Mason	Charles B. Waggener	delegate
Mason	Daniel Polsley	delegate

== Archives ==
The proceedings of the First Wheeling Convention were recorded by Judge Gibson Lamb Cranmer of Ohio County, Charles B. Waggener of Mason County, and Marshall M. Dent of Monongalia County. Judge Cranmer was also the Secretary of the Second Wheeling Convention and custodian of the manuscript proceedings, journals, and other documents of the convention. However, his records for the convention were lost during an 1884 flood of Wheeling Island. Copies of the records were sought in Alexandria and Richmond but none were found. Virgil A. Lewis, State Historian of West Virginia, reconstructed them from daily records printed in the Wheeling Daily Intelligencer by Granville D. Hall, and published them as How West Virginia Was Made in 1909 (Hall having published The Rending of Virginia from his editing of the records in 1902).

== See also ==
- East Tennessee Convention, a similar event by pro-Union East Tennessee representatives
- Alexander Scott Withers, delegate for Lewis County at the First Convention
- Virginia Conventions

== Bibliography ==
- Rice, Otis K. (1986). History of Greenbrier County. Greenbrier Historical Society. ISBN 978-0-9617-5050-3.
- "Second Wheeling Convention". e-WV. the West Virginia Encyclopedia.
- "Delegates to the Second Wheeling Convention". A State of Convenience: the creation of West Virginia. e-WV: the West Virginia Encyclopedia.
- "Proceedings of the Second Wheeling Convention". A State of Convenience: the creation of West Virginia. Wheeling Intelligencer. June 14, 1861.
- "Proceedings of the Second Wheeling Convention". A State of Convenience: the creation of West Virginia. Wheeling Intelligencer. June 17, 1861.
