= List of United States representatives in the 24th Congress =

This is a complete list of United States representatives during the 24th United States Congress listed by seniority.

As an historical article, the districts and party affiliations listed reflect those during the 24th Congress (March 4, 1835 – March 3, 1837). Seats and party affiliations on similar lists for other congresses will be different for certain members.

Seniority depends on the date on which members were sworn into office. Since many members are sworn in on the same day, subsequent ranking is based on previous congressional service of the individual and then by alphabetical order by the last name of the representative.

Committee chairmanship in the House is often associated with seniority. However, party leadership is typically not associated with seniority.

Note: An asterisk ("*") indicates that the representative/delegate may have served one or more non-consecutive terms while in the House of Representatives of the United States Congress.

== U.S. House seniority list ==
U.S. House seniority
Rank	Representative	Party	District	Seniority date (previous service, if any)	No.# of term(s)	Notes
1	Lewis Williams	AJ	NC-13	March 4, 1815	11th term	Dean of the House
2	Charles F. Mercer	AJ	VA-14	March 4, 1817	10th term	
3	Henry William Connor	J	NC-11	March 4, 1821	8th term	
4	John Reed Jr.	AM	MA-11	March 4, 1821; Previous service, 1813–1817.	10th term*	
5	Churchill C. Cambreleng	J	NY-03	December 3, 1821	8th term	
6	Samuel Finley Vinton	AJ	OH-06	March 4, 1823	7th term	Left the House in 1837.
7	Elisha Whittlesey	AJ	OH-16	March 4, 1823	7th term	
8	Dutee Jerauld Pearce	AM	RI	March 4, 1825	6th term	Left the House in 1837.
9	Nathaniel Claiborne	AJ	VA-07	March 4, 1825	6th term	Left the House in 1837.
10	James K. Polk	J	TN-09	March 4, 1825	6th term	Speaker of the House
11	John Bell	AJ	TN-07	March 4, 1827	5th term	
12	Augustine Henry Shepperd	AJ	NC-09	March 4, 1827	5th term	
13	Ratliff Boon	J	IN-01	March 4, 1829; Previous service, 1825–1827.	5th term*	
14	Joseph Halsey Crane	AJ	OH-03	March 4, 1829	4th term	Left the House in 1837.
15	Horace Everett	AJ	VT-03	March 4, 1829	4th term	
16	George Grennell Jr.	AJ	MA-06	March 4, 1829	4th term	
17	Leonard Jarvis	J	ME-06	March 4, 1829	4th term	Left the House in 1837.
18	Cave Johnson	J	TN-11	March 4, 1829	4th term	Left the House in 1837.
19	Richard Mentor Johnson	J	KY-13	March 4, 1829; Previous service, 1807–1819.	10th term*	Left the House in 1837.
20	Dixon H. Lewis	J	AL-04	March 4, 1829	4th term	
21	Henry A. P. Muhlenberg	J	PA-09	March 4, 1829	4th term	
22	Abraham Rencher	AJ	NC-10	March 4, 1829	4th term	
23	William Biddle Shepard	AJ	NC-01	March 4, 1829	4th term	Left the House in 1837.
24	Jesse Speight	J	NC-04	March 4, 1829	4th term	Left the House in 1837.
25	James Israel Standifer	AJ	TN-04	March 4, 1829; Previous service, 1823–1825.	5th term*	
26	John Thomson	J	OH-17	March 4, 1829; Previous service, 1825–1827.	5th term*	Left the House in 1837.
27	Campbell P. White	J	NY-03	March 4, 1829	4th term	Resigned on October 2, 1835.
28	George Evans	AJ	ME-04	July 20, 1829	4th term	
29	Harmar Denny	AM	PA-22	December 15, 1829	4th term	Left the House in 1837.
30	John M. Patton	D	VA-13	November 25, 1830	4th term	
31	John Quincy Adams	AM	MA-12	March 4, 1831	3rd term	
32	Chilton Allan	AJ	KY-10	March 4, 1831	3rd term	Left the House in 1837.
33	Heman Allen	AJ	VT-04	March 4, 1831	3rd term	
34	John Banks	AM	PA-24	March 4, 1831	3rd term	Resigned on March 31, 1836.
35	Samuel Beardsley	J	NY-17	March 4, 1831	3rd term	Resigned on March 29, 1836.
36	George N. Briggs	AJ	MA-07	March 4, 1831	3rd term	
37	John Carr	J	IN-03	March 4, 1831	3rd term	Left the House in 1837.
38	Thomas Corwin	AJ	OH-04	March 4, 1831	3rd term	
39	John K. Griffin	N	SC-09	March 4, 1831	3rd term	
40	Albert Gallatin Hawes	J	KY-02	March 4, 1831	3rd term	Left the House in 1837.
41	William Hiester	AM	PA-04	March 4, 1831	3rd term	Left the House in 1837.
42	Gerrit Y. Lansing	J	NY-10	March 4, 1831	3rd term	Left the House in 1837.
43	John Y. Mason	J	VA-02	March 4, 1831	3rd term	Resigned on January 11, 1837.
44	Johnathan McCarty	AJ	IN-05	March 4, 1831	3rd term	Left the House in 1837.
45	James Iver McKay	J	NC-05	March 4, 1831	3rd term	
46	Thomas McKean Thompson McKennan	AM	PA-21	March 4, 1831	3rd term	
47	John J. Milligan	AJ	DE	March 4, 1831	3rd term	
48	David Potts Jr.	AM	PA-04	March 4, 1831	3rd term	
49	Francis Thomas	J	MD-06	March 4, 1831	3rd term	
50	Aaron Ward	AJ	NY-04	March 4, 1831; Previous service, 1825–1829.	5th term*	Left the House in 1837.
51	Daniel Wardwell	J	NY-18	March 4, 1831	3rd term	Left the House in 1837.
52	William Henry Ashley	AJ	MO	October 31, 1831	3rd term	Left the House in 1837.
53	William Slade	AM	VT-02	November 1, 1831	3rd term	
54	Micajah Thomas Hawkins	J	NC-06	December 15, 1831	3rd term	
55	Hiland Hall	AJ	VT-01	January 1, 1833	3rd term	
56	Joseph Biles Anthony	J	PA-16	March 4, 1833	2nd term	Left the House in 1837.
57	James M. H. Beale	J	VA-16	March 4, 1833	2nd term	Left the House in 1837.
58	Benning M. Bean	J	NH	March 4, 1833	2nd term	Left the House in 1837.
59	Andrew Beaumont	J	PA-15	March 4, 1833	2nd term	Left the House in 1837.
60	John W. Brown	J	NY-06	March 4, 1833	2nd term	Left the House in 1837.
61	Abraham Bockee	J	NY-05	March 4, 1833; Previous service, 1829–1831.	3rd term*	Left the House in 1837.
62	Samuel Bunch	AJ	TN-02	March 4, 1833	2nd term	Left the House in 1837.
63	Robert Burns	J	NH	March 4, 1833	2nd term	Left the House in 1837.
64	Jesse Atherton Bynum	J	NC-02	March 4, 1833	2nd term	
65	Zadok Casey	J	IL-02	March 4, 1833	2nd term	
66	George Chambers	AM	PA-12	March 4, 1833	2nd term	Left the House in 1837.
67	John Chaney	J	OH-09	March 4, 1833	2nd term	
68	William Clark	AM	PA-10	March 4, 1833	2nd term	Left the House in 1837.
69	John E. Coffee	J	GA	March 4, 1833	2nd term	Died on September 25, 1836.
70	John Cramer	J	NY-11	March 4, 1833	2nd term	Left the House in 1837.
71	Edward Darlington	AM	PA-04	March 4, 1833	2nd term	
72	Edmund Deberry	AJ	NC-07	March 4, 1833; Previous service, 1829–1831.	3rd term*	
73	Philemon Dickerson	J	NJ	March 4, 1833	2nd term	Resigned on November 3, 1836.
74	William Claiborne Dunlap	J	TN-13	March 4, 1833	2nd term	Left the House in 1837.
75	John B. Forester	AJ	TN-05	March 4, 1833	2nd term	Left the House in 1837.
76	Samuel Fowler	J	NJ	March 4, 1833	2nd term	Left the House in 1837.
77	Philo C. Fuller	AJ	NY-30	March 4, 1833	2nd term	Resigned on September 2, 1836.
78	William K. Fuller	J	NY-23	March 4, 1833	2nd term	Left the House in 1837.
79	John Galbraith	J	PA-25	March 4, 1833	2nd term	Left the House in 1837.
80	Ransom H. Gillet	J	NY-14	March 4, 1833	2nd term	Left the House in 1837.
81	James Graham	AJ	NC-12	March 4, 1833	2nd term	Resigned on March 29, 1836. Returned to the House on December 5, 1836.
82	William J. Grayson	N	SC-02	March 4, 1833	2nd term	Left the House in 1837.
83	Joseph Hall	J	ME-07	March 4, 1833	2nd term	Left the House in 1837.
84	Thomas L. Hamer	J	OH-05	March 4, 1833	2nd term	
85	Edward A. Hannegan	J	IN-07	March 4, 1833	2nd term	Left the House in 1837.
86	Benjamin Hardin	AJ	KY-07	March 4, 1833; Previous service, 1815–1817 and 1819–1823.	5th term**	Left the House in 1837.
87	Gideon Hard	AJ	NY-33	March 4, 1833	2nd term	Left the House in 1837.
88	James Harper	AJ	PA-02	March 4, 1833	2nd term	Left the House in 1837.
89	Samuel Smith Harrison	J	PA-23	March 4, 1833	2nd term	Left the House in 1837.
90	Abner Hazeltine	AJ	NY-31	March 4, 1833	2nd term	Left the House in 1837.
91	Joseph Henderson	J	PA-14	March 4, 1833	2nd term	Left the House in 1837.
92	Abel Huntington	J	NY-01	March 4, 1833	2nd term	Left the House in 1837.
93	William Jackson	AM	MA-09	March 4, 1833	2nd term	Left the House in 1837.
94	Benjamin Jones	J	OH-18	March 4, 1833	2nd term	Left the House in 1837.
95	George L. Kinnard	J	IN-06	March 4, 1833	2nd term	Died on November 26, 1836.
96	Amos Lane	J	IN-04	March 4, 1833	2nd term	Left the House in 1837.
97	John Laporte	J	PA-17	March 4, 1833	2nd term	Left the House in 1837.
98	George W. Lay	AJ	NY-29	March 4, 1833	2nd term	Left the House in 1837.
99	Luke Lea	AJ	TN-03	March 4, 1833	2nd term	Left the House in 1837.
100	Thomas Lee	J	NJ	March 4, 1833	2nd term	Left the House in 1837.
101	George Loyall	J	VA-01	March 4, 1833; Previous service, 1830–1831.	3rd term*	Left the House in 1837.
102	Edward Lucas	J	VA-15	March 4, 1833	2nd term	Left the House in 1837.
103	Abijah Mann Jr.	J	NY-16	March 4, 1833	2nd term	Left the House in 1837.
104	Moses Mason Jr.	J	ME-05	March 4, 1833	2nd term	Left the House in 1837.
105	William McComas	AJ	VA-19	March 4, 1833	2nd term	Left the House in 1837.
106	Isaac McKim	J	MD-04	March 4, 1833; Previous service, 1823–1825.	4th term*	
107	Jeremiah McLene	J	OH-08	March 4, 1833	2nd term	Left the House in 1837.
108	Jesse Miller	J	PA-13	March 4, 1833	2nd term	Resigned on October 30, 1836.
109	Sherman Page	J	NY-19	March 4, 1833	2nd term	Left the House in 1837.
110	James Parker	J	NJ	March 4, 1833	2nd term	Left the House in 1837.
111	Gorham Parks	J	ME-08	March 4, 1833	2nd term	Left the House in 1837.
112	William Patterson	J	OH-14	March 4, 1833	2nd term	Left the House in 1837.
113	Balie Peyton	AJ	TN-06	March 4, 1833	2nd term	Left the House in 1837.
114	Franklin Pierce	J	NH	March 4, 1833	2nd term	Left the House in 1837.
115	Henry L. Pinckney	N	SC-01	March 4, 1833	2nd term	Left the House in 1837.
116	Ferdinand Schureman Schenck	J	NJ	March 4, 1833	2nd term	Left the House in 1837.
117	William Schley	J	GA	March 4, 1833	2nd term	Resigned on July 1, 1835.
118	William Norton Shinn	J	NJ	March 4, 1833	2nd term	Left the House in 1837.
119	Jonathan Sloane	AM	OH-15	March 4, 1833	2nd term	Left the House in 1837.
120	Francis Ormand Jonathan Smith	J	ME-02	March 4, 1833	2nd term	
121	David Spangler	AJ	OH-13	March 4, 1833	2nd term	Left the House in 1837.
122	William Taylor	J	NY-23	March 4, 1833	2nd term	
123	James Turner	J	MD-03	March 4, 1833	2nd term	Left the House in 1837.
124	Joel Turrill	J	NY-17	March 4, 1833	2nd term	Left the House in 1837.
125	Aaron Vanderpoel	J	NY-08	March 4, 1833	2nd term	Left the House in 1837.
126	David Douglas Wagener	J	PA-07	March 4, 1833	2nd term	
127	Taylor Webster	J	OH-02	March 4, 1833	2nd term	
128	Henry A. Wise	J	VA-08	March 4, 1833	2nd term	
129	Joel Barlow Sutherland	J	PA-01	October 8, 1833; Previous service, 1827–1833.	5th term*	Left the House in 1837.
130	Levi Lincoln Jr.	AJ	MA-05	February 17, 1834	2nd term	
131	Robert B. Campbell	N	SC-03	February 27, 1834; Previous service, 1823–1825.	3rd term*	Left the House in 1837.
132	James Bouldin	J	VA-05	March 15, 1834	2nd term	
133	Rice Garland	AJ	LA-03	April 28, 1834	2nd term	
134	John Nevett Steele	AJ	MD-01	May 29, 1834	2nd term	Left the House in 1837.
135	Henry Johnson	AJ	LA-01	September 25, 1834	2nd term	
136	Daniel Kilgore	J	OH-19	December 1, 1834	2nd term	
137	William L. May	J	IL-03	December 1, 1834	2nd term	
138	Stephen C. Phillips	AJ	MA-02	December 1, 1834	2nd term	
139	John Reynolds	J	IL-01	December 1, 1834	2nd term	Left the House in 1837.
140	Henry Fisk Janes	AM	VT-05	December 1, 1834	2nd term	Left the House in 1837.
141	Richard Irvine Manning I	J	SC-08	December 8, 1834	2nd term	Died on May 1, 1836.
142	Francis Wilkinson Pickens	N	SC-05	December 8, 1834	2nd term	
143	John Robertson	AJ	VA-11	December 8, 1834	2nd term	
144	Michael Woolston Ash	J	PA-03	March 4, 1835	1st term	Left the House in 1837.
145	Jeremiah Bailey	AJ	ME-03	March 4, 1835	1st term	Left the House in 1837.
146	Samuel Barton	J	NY-02	March 4, 1835	1st term	Left the House in 1837.
147	William K. Bond	AJ	OH-07	March 4, 1835	1st term	
148	Nathaniel B. Borden	J	MA-10	March 4, 1835	1st term	
149	Matthias J. Bovee	J	NY-15	March 4, 1835	1st term	Left the House in 1837.
150	Linn Boyd	J	KY-01	March 4, 1835	1st term	Left the House in 1837.
151	Andrew Buchanan	J	PA-20	March 4, 1835	1st term	
152	John Calhoon	AJ	KY-06	March 4, 1835; Previous service, 1827.	2nd term*	
153	William B. Calhoun	AJ	MA-08	March 4, 1835	1st term	
154	William Blount Carter	AJ	TN-01	March 4, 1835	1st term	
155	Graham H. Chapin	J	NY-25	March 4, 1835	1st term	Left the House in 1837.
156	Reuben Chapman	J	AL-01	March 4, 1835	1st term	
157	John Chambers	AJ	KY-12	March 4, 1835; Previous service, 1828–1829.	2nd term*	
158	Timothy Childs	AJ	NY-28	March 4, 1835; Previous service, 1829–1831.	2nd term*	
159	John Francis Hamtramck Claiborne	J	MS	March 4, 1835	1st term	Left the House in 1837.
160	Walter Coles	J	VA-06	March 4, 1835	1st term	
161	Robert Craig	J	VA-17	March 4, 1835; Previous service, 1829–1833.	3rd term*	
162	Caleb Cushing	AJ	MA-03	March 4, 1835	1st term	
163	Samuel Cushman	J	NH	March 4, 1835	1st term	
164	John Wesley Davis	J	IN-02	March 4, 1835	1st term	Left the House in 1837.
165	David Dickson	AJ	MS	March 4, 1835	1st term	Died on July 31, 1836.
166	Ulysses F. Doubleday	J	NY-24	March 4, 1835; Previous service, 1831–1833.	2nd term*	Left the House in 1837.
167	George Dromgoole	J	VA-04	March 4, 1835	1st term	
168	Valentine Efner	J	NY-08	March 4, 1835	1st term	Left the House in 1837.
169	John Fairfield	J	ME-01	March 4, 1835	1st term	
170	Dudley Farlin	J	NY-13	March 4, 1835	1st term	Left the House in 1837.
171	Richard French	J	KY-11	March 4, 1835	1st term	Left the House in 1837.
172	Jacob Fry Jr.	J	PA-05	March 4, 1835	1st term	
173	James Garland	J	VA-12	March 4, 1835	1st term	
174	Francis Granger	J	NY-26	March 4, 1835	1st term	Left the House in 1837.
175	Seaton Grantland	J	GA	March 4, 1835	1st term	
176	William J. Graves	AJ	KY-08	March 4, 1835	1st term	
177	Elisha Haley	J	CT	March 4, 1835	1st term	
178	James Henry Hammond	N	SC-04	March 4, 1835	1st term	Resigned on February 26, 1836.
179	James Harlan	AJ	KY-05	March 4, 1835	1st term	
180	Albert Galliton Harrison	J	MO	March 4, 1835	1st term	
181	Charles Eaton Haynes	J	GA	March 4, 1835; Previous service, 1825–1831.	4th term*	
182	Samuel Hoar	AJ	MA-04	March 4, 1835	1st term	Left the House in 1837.
183	George W. Hopkins	J	VA-18	March 4, 1835	1st term	
184	Benjamin Chew Howard	J	MD-04	March 4, 1835; Previous service, 1829–1833.	3rd term*	
185	Elias Howell	AJ	OH-12	March 4, 1835	1st term	Left the House in 1837.
186	Edward Burd Hubley	J	PA-08	March 4, 1835	1st term	
187	Hiram P. Hunt	AJ	NY-09	March 4, 1835	1st term	Left the House in 1837.
188	Adam Huntsman	J	TN-12	March 4, 1835	1st term	Left the House in 1837.
189	Joseph Reed Ingersoll	AJ	PA-02	March 4, 1835	1st term	Left the House in 1837.
190	Samuel Ingham	J	CT	March 4, 1835	1st term	
191	Daniel Jenifer	AJ	MD-07	March 4, 1835; Previous service, 1831–1833.	2nd term*	
192	Joseph Johnson	J	VA-20	March 4, 1835; Previous service, 1823–1827 and 1833.	4th term**	
193	John W. Jones	J	VA-03	March 4, 1835	1st term	
194	Andrew T. Judson	J	CT	March 4, 1835	1st term	Resigned on July 4, 1836.
195	William Kennon, Sr.	J	OH-11	March 4, 1835; Previous service, 1829–1833.	3rd term*	Left the House in 1837.
196	John Klingensmith Jr.	J	PA-19	March 4, 1835	1st term	
197	Joab Lawler	J	AL-03	March 4, 1835	1st term	
198	Abbott Lawrence	AJ	MA-01	March 4, 1835	1st term	Left the House in 1837.
199	Joshua Lee	J	NY-27	March 4, 1835	1st term	Left the House in 1837.
200	Stephen B. Leonard	J	NY-22	March 4, 1835	1st term	Left the House in 1837.
201	Henry Logan	J	PA-11	March 4, 1835	1st term	
202	Thomas C. Love	AJ	NY-32	March 4, 1835	1st term	Left the House in 1837.
203	Francis Strother Lyon	AJ	AL-05	March 4, 1835	1st term	
204	Job Mann	J	PA-18	March 4, 1835	1st term	Left the House in 1837.
205	Joshua L. Martin	J	AL-02	March 4, 1835	1st term	
206	Samson Mason	AJ	OH-10	March 4, 1835	1st term	
207	William Mason	J	NY-21	March 4, 1835	1st term	Left the House in 1837.
208	Abram Poindexter Maury	AJ	TN-08	March 4, 1835	1st term	
209	John McKeon	J	NY-03	March 4, 1835	1st term	Left the House in 1837.
210	William Montgomery	J	NC-08	March 4, 1835	1st term	
211	Ely Moore	J	NY-03	March 4, 1835	1st term	
212	William S. Morgan	J	VA-21	March 4, 1835	1st term	
213	Mathias Morris	W	PA-06	March 4, 1835	1st term	
214	George Welshman Owens	J	GA	March 4, 1835	1st term	
215	James Pearce	AJ	MD-02	March 4, 1835	1st term	
216	Ebenezer Pettigrew	AJ	NC-03	March 4, 1835	1st term	Left the House in 1837.
217	Lancelot Phelps	J	CT	March 4, 1835	1st term	
218	Joseph Reynolds	J	NY-22	March 4, 1835	1st term	Left the House in 1837.
219	Eleazer Wheelock Ripley	J	LA-02	March 4, 1835	1st term	
220	John Roane	J	VA-09	March 4, 1835; Previous service, 1809–1815 and 1827–1831.	7th term**	Left the House in 1837.
221	James Rogers	J	SC-07	March 4, 1835	1st term	Left the House in 1837.
222	David Abel Russell	AJ	NY-12	March 4, 1835	1st term	
223	John W. A. Sanford	J	GA	March 4, 1835	1st term	Resigned on July 25, 1835.
224	William Seymour	J	NY-20	March 4, 1835	1st term	Left the House in 1837.
225	Ebenezer J. Shields	AJ	TN-10	March 4, 1835	1st term	
226	Nicholas Sickles	J	NY-07	March 4, 1835	1st term	Left the House in 1837.
227	William Sprague III	AM	RI	March 4, 1835	1st term	Left the House in 1837.
228	Bellamy Storer	AJ	OH-01	March 4, 1835	1st term	Left the House in 1837.
229	John Taliaferro	AJ	VA-10	March 4, 1835; Previous service, 1801–1803, 1811–1813 and 1824–1831.	7th term***	
230	James C. Terrell	J	GA	March 4, 1835	1st term	Resigned on July 8, 1835.
231	Isaac Toucey	J	CT	March 4, 1835	1st term	
232	George W. Towns	J	GA	March 4, 1835	1st term	Resigned on September 1, 1836.
233	Joseph R. Underwood	AJ	KY-03	March 4, 1835	1st term	
234	George Corbin Washington	AJ	MD-05	March 4, 1835; Previous service, 1827–1833.	4th term*	Left the House in 1837.
235	Joseph Weeks	J	NH	March 4, 1835	1st term	
236	John White	AJ	KY-09	March 4, 1835	1st term	
237	Zalmon Wildman	J	CT	March 4, 1835	1st term	Died on December 10, 1835.
238	Sherrod Williams	AJ	KY-04	March 4, 1835	1st term	
	Waddy Thompson Jr.	AJ	SC-06	September 10, 1835	1st term	
	Jesse Franklin Cleveland	J	GA	October 5, 1835	1st term	
	Thomas Glascock	J	GA	October 5, 1835	1st term	
	Hopkins Holsey	J	GA	October 5, 1835	1st term	
	Jabez Young Jackson	J	GA	October 5, 1835	1st term	
	Gideon Lee	J	NY-03	December 7, 1835	1st term	Left the House in 1837.
	Thomas T. Whittlesey	J	CT	April 29, 1836	1st term	
	William Crosby Dawson	AJ	GA	November 7, 1836	1st term	
	Rutger B. Miller	J	NY-17	November 9, 1836	1st term	Left the House in 1837.
	John Young	AJ	NY-30	November 9, 1836	1st term	Left the House in 1837.
	Samuel J. Gholson	J	MS	December 1, 1836	1st term	Left the House in 1837.
	Orrin Holt	J	CT	December 4, 1836	1st term	
	James Black	J	PA-13	December 5, 1836	1st term	Left the House in 1837.
	William Chetwood	AJ	NJ	December 5, 1836	1st term	Left the House in 1837.
	John James Pearson	AJ	PA-24	December 5, 1836	1st term	Left the House in 1837.
	Franklin H. Elmore	N	SC-04	December 10, 1836	1st term	
	Archibald Yell	J	AR	December 14, 1836	1st term	
	John Peter Richardson II	J	SC-08	December 19, 1836	1st term	
	Julius Caesar Alford	AJ	GA	January 2, 1837	1st term	Left the House in 1837.
	William Herod	AJ	IN-06	January 25, 1837	1st term	
	Isaac E. Crary	J	MI	January 26, 1837	1st term	

== Delegates ==
Rank	Delegate	Party	District	Seniority date (previous service, if any)	No.# of term(s)	Notes
1	Joseph M. White	J	FL	March 4, 1825	6th term	
2	Ambrose Hundley Sevier	J	AR	February 13, 1828	5th term	
3	George Wallace Jones	J	MI	March 4, 1835	1st term	
	George Wallace Jones	D	WI	January 26, 1837; Previous service, 1835–1837.	2nd term*	

== See also ==
- 24th United States Congress
- List of United States congressional districts
- List of United States senators in the 24th Congress
