= 1836 United States presidential election in Indiana =

- November 7, 1836
- Turnout: 69.2% ▼2.7 pp
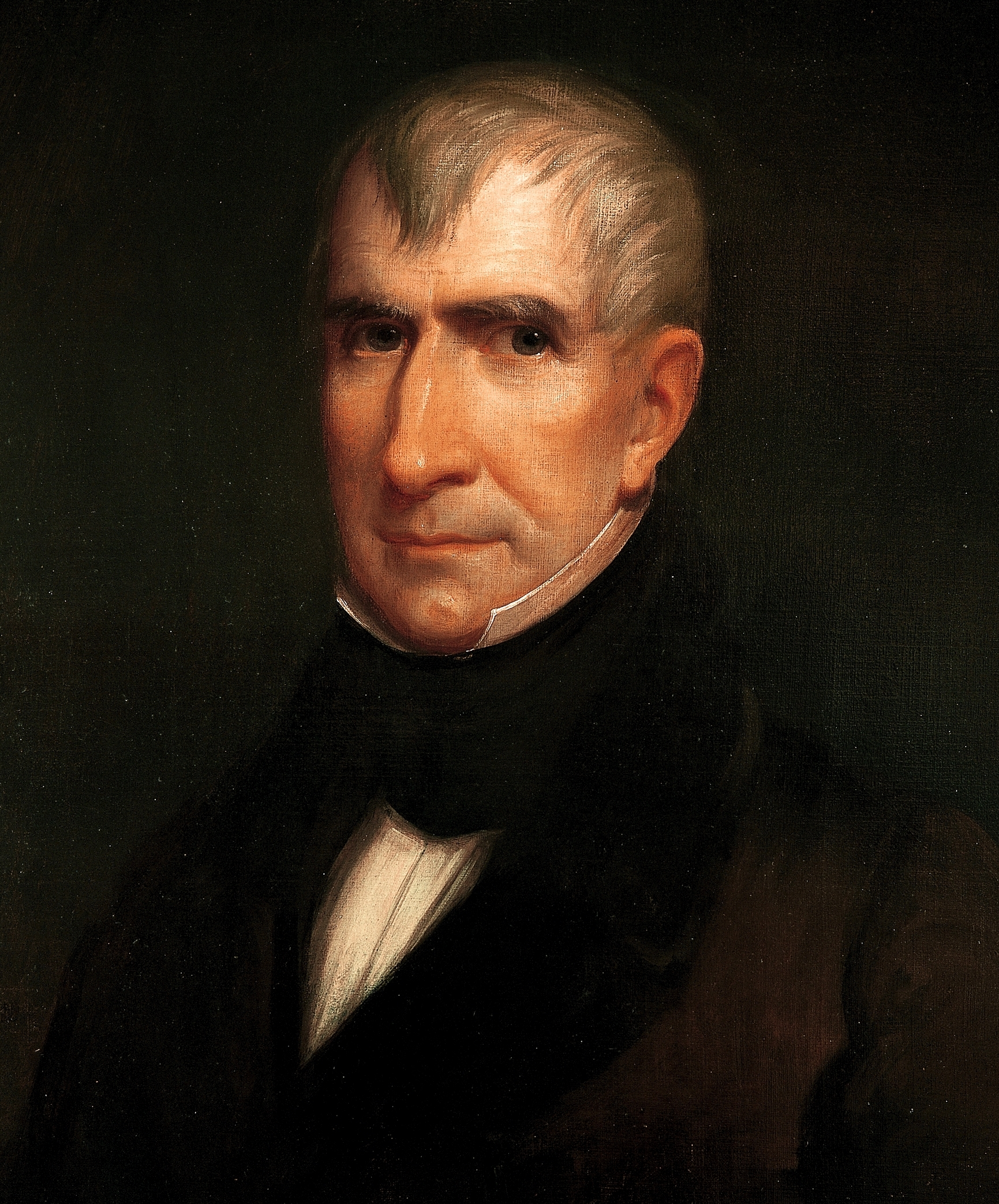

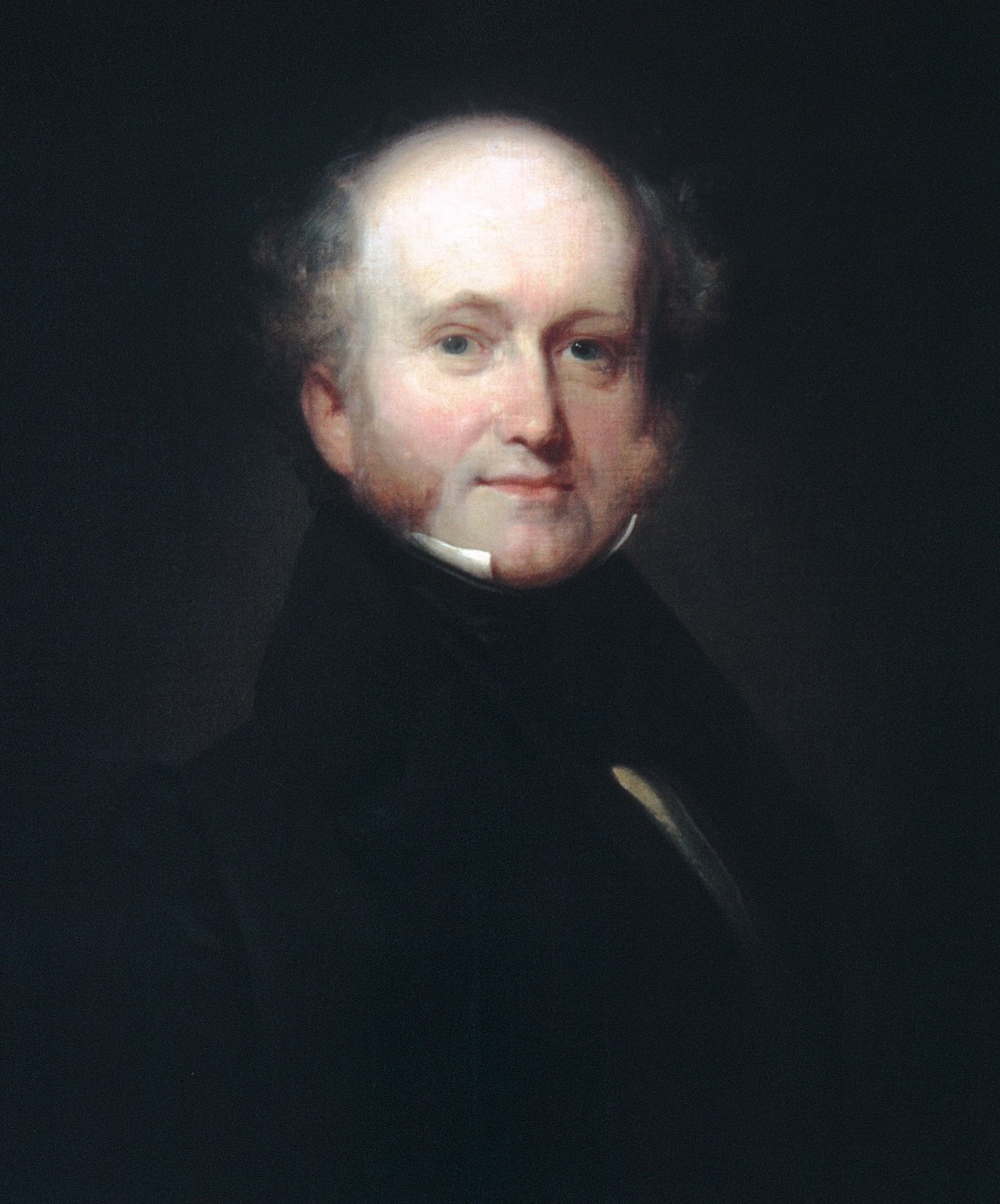
Nominee	William Henry Harrison	Martin Van Buren
Party	Whig	Democratic
Home state	Ohio	New York
Running mate	Francis Granger	Richard Mentor Johnson
Electoral vote	9	0
Popular vote	41,281	32,978
Percentage	55.59%	44.41%
County results
Harrison
50–60%
60–70%
70–80%
Van Buren
50–60%
60–70%
70–80%
Unknown/No vote
President before election
Andrew Jackson
Democratic
Elected President
Martin Van Buren
Democratic

A presidential election was held in Indiana on November 7, 1836, as part of the 1836 United States presidential election. The Whig ticket of the former major general William Henry Harrison and the U.S. representative from New York's 26th congressional district Francis Granger defeated the Democratic ticket of the incumbent vice president Martin Van Buren and the U.S. representative from Kentucky's 13th congressional district Richard Mentor Johnson. Van Buren defeated Harrison in the national election with 170 electoral votes.

== General election ==
=== Summary ===
Indiana chose nine electors in a statewide general election. Nineteenth-century presidential elections used a form of block voting that allowed voters to modify the electoral list nominated by a political party before submitting their ballots. Because voters elected each member of the Electoral College individually, electors nominated by the same party often received differing numbers of votes as a consequence of voter rolloff, split-ticket voting, or electoral fusion. This table compares the votes for the most popular elector pledged to each ticket, to give an approximate sense of the statewide result.

1836 United States presidential election in Indiana
Party	Candidate	Votes	%	±%
Whig	William Henry Harrison Francis Granger	41,281	55.59	▲11.06
Democratic	Martin Van Buren Richard Mentor Johnson	32,978	44.41	▼11.01
Total votes		74,259	100.00	

=== Results ===
1836 United States presidential election in Indiana
Party	Candidate	Votes
Whig	John G. Clendenin	41,281
Whig	Marston G. Clark	41,280
Whig	Milton Stapp	41,278
Whig	Abraham P. Andrew	41,276
Whig	Albert Smith White	41,276
Whig	Achilles Williams	41,276
Whig	Hiram Decker	41,275
Whig	Enoch McCarty	41,275
Whig	Austin W. Morris	41,271
Democratic	John Myers	32,978
Democratic	Jesse Jackson	32,977
Democratic	George W. Moore	32,977
Democratic	Thomas C. Stewart	32,977
Democratic	William White	32,975
Democratic	Rockhill William	32,975
Democratic	Marinus Willett	32,973
Democratic	Jonathan Williams	32,971
Democratic	Elisha Long	32,967
Total		≈74,259

=== Results by county ===
The following table compares the votes for the leading Democratic and Whig electors in each county. It therefore differs slightly from the summary table, which compares the votes for the leading electors statewide.

1836 United States presidential election in Indiana by county
County	William Henry Harrison Whig		Martin Van Buren Democratic		Margin		Total
County	Votes	%	Votes	%	Votes	%	Total
Adams	68	70.83%	28	29.17%	40	41.67%	96
Allen	354	57.10%	266	42.90%	88	14.19%	620
Bartholomew	608	59.61%	412	40.39%	196	19.22%	1,020
Boone	464	52.43%	421	47.57%	43	4.86%	885
Carroll	375	39.89%	565	60.11%	-190	−20.21%	940
Cass	513	64.21%	286	35.79%	227	28.41%	799
Clark	893	47.73%	978	52.27%	-85	−4.54%	1,871
Clay	153	37.87%	251	62.13%	-98	−24.26%	404
Clinton	331	43.67%	427	56.20%	-96	−12.66%	758
Crawford	196	54.14%	166	45.86%	30	8.29%	362
Daviess	438	63.39%	253	36.61%	185	26.77%	691
Dearborn	1,203	48.41%	1,282	51.59%	-79	−3.18%	2,485
Decatur	950	64.94%	513	35.06%	437	29.87%	1,463
Delaware	369	54.59%	307	45.41%	62	9.17%	676
Dubois	165	56.51%	127	43.49%	38	13.01%	292
Elkhart	354	53.72%	305	46.28%	49	7.44%	659
Fayette	965	63.91%	545	36.09%	420	27.81%	1,510
Floyd	574	36.49%	999	63.51%	-425	−27.02%	1,573
Fountain	697	42.37%	948	57.63%	-251	−15.26%	1,645
Franklin	963	52.39%	875	47.61%	88	4.79%	1,838
Fulton	55	58.51%	39	41.49%	16	17.02%	94
Gibson	496	53.85%	425	46.15%	71	7.71%	921
Grant	238	64.67%	130	35.33%	108	29.35%	368
Greene	366	52.59%	330	47.41%	36	5.17%	696
Hamilton	569	68.47%	262	31.53%	307	36.94%	831
Hancock	366	55.54%	293	44.46%	73	11.08%	659
Harrison	747	62.09%	456	37.91%	291	24.19%	1,203
Hendricks	731	65.21%	390	34.79%	341	30.42%	1,121
Henry	1,304	64.68%	712	35.32%	592	29.37%	2,016
Huntington	52	43.70%	67	56.30%	-15	−12.61%	119
Jackson	439	58.85%	307	41.15%	132	17.69%	746
Jefferson	1,172	63.32%	679	36.68%	493	26.63%	1,851
Jennings	626	68.19%	292	31.81%	334	36.38%	918
Johnson	438	43.93%	559	56.07%	-121	−12.14%	997
Knox	736	62.75%	437	37.25%	299	25.49%	1,173
Kosciusko	160	51.78%	149	48.22%	11	3.56%	309
LaGrange	138	47.92%	150	52.08%	-12	−4.17%	288
LaPorte	490	52.02%	452	47.98%	38	4.03%	942
Lawrence	670	45.12%	815	54.88%	-145	−9.76%	1,485
Madison	487	57.03%	367	42.97%	120	14.05%	854
Marion	1,409	57.46%	1,043	42.54%	366	14.93%	2,452
Marshall	94	69.12%	42	30.88%	52	38.24%	136
Martin	142	41.89%	197	58.11%	-55	−16.22%	339
Miami	133	62.44%	80	37.56%	53	24.88%	213
Monroe	424	41.25%	604	58.75%	180	17.51%	1,028
Montgomery	1,066	58.64%	752	41.36%	314	17.27%	1,818
Morgan	666	55.09%	543	44.91%	123	10.17%	1,209
Noble	46	36.51%	80	63.49%	-34	−26.98%	126
Orange	483	46.13%	564	53.87%	-81	−7.74%	1,047
Owen	427	59.89%	286	40.11%	141	19.78%	713
Parke	828	60.79%	534	39.21%	294	21.59%	1,362
Perry	392	77.47%	114	22.53%	278	54.94%	506
Pike	226	50.90%	218	49.10%	8	1.80%	444
Porter	87	55.77%	69	44.23%	18	11.54%	156
Posey	330	30.53%	751	69.47%	-421	−38.95%	1,081
Putnam	1,067	60.59%	694	39.41%	373	21.18%	1,761
Randolph	633	73.01%	234	26.99%	399	46.02%	867
Ripley	663	59.41%	453	40.59%	210	18.82%	1,116
Rush	1,167	60.91%	749	38.62%	418	21.82%	1,916
St. Joseph	480	65.31%	255	34.69%	225	30.61%	735
Scott	294	52.41%	267	47.59%	27	4.81%	561
Shelby	688	50.48%	675	49.52%	13	0.95%	1,363
Spencer	171	48.86%	179	51.14%	-8	−2.29%	350
Sullivan	203 (Note: Including 126 votes (17%) for Harrison and Granger and 77 votes (10%) for Harrison and no running mate.)	26.68%	558	73.32%	-355	−46.65%	761
Switzerland	630	54.83%	519	45.17%	111	9.66%	1,149
Tippecanoe	1,244	54.44%	1,041	45.56%	203	8.88%	2,285
Union	700	51.17%	568	41.52%	132	9.65%	1,368
Vanderburgh	269	67.42%	130	32.58%	139	34.84%	399
Vermillion	574	57.00%	433	43.00%	131	13.01%	1,007
Vigo	963	77.04%	287	22.96%	676	54.08%	1,250
Wabash	122	72.19%	47	27.81%	75	44.38%	169
Warren	541	62.18%	329	37.82%	212	24.37%	870
Warrick	157	29.24%	380	70.76%	-223	−41.53%	537
Washington	656	40.92%	947	59.08%	-291	−18.15%	1,603
Wayne	2,285	69.88%	985	30.12%	1,300	39.76%	3,270
White	109	50.70%	106	49.30%	3	1.40%	215
TOTAL	41,282	55.59%	32,978	44.41%	8,304	11.18%	74,260

=== Results by congressional district ===
Congressional district results Whig 50–60% Whig 60–70%

1836 United States presidential election in Indiana by congressional district
District	Harrison	Van Buren	Representative
1st	50.85%	49.15%	Ratliff Boon
2nd	55.70%	44.30%	John Wesley Davis (24th Congress)
2nd	55.70%	44.30%	John Ewing (25th Congress)
3rd	55.94%	44.06%	John Carr (24th Congress)
3rd	55.94%	44.06%	William Graham (25th Congress)
4th	55.70%	44.30%	Amos Lane (24th Congress)
4th	55.70%	44.30%	George H. Dunn (25th Congress)
5th	63.84%	36.16%	Jonathan McCarty (24th Congress)
5th	63.84%	36.16%	James Rariden (25th Congress)
6th	55.83%	44.17%	George L. Kinnard (24th Congress)
6th	55.83%	44.17%	William Herod (25th Congress)
7th	53.70%	46.30%	Edward A. Hannegan (24th Congress)
7th	53.70%	46.30%	Albert White (25th Congress)

== See also ==
- United States presidential elections in Indiana

== Bibliography ==
- "1836 Electoral College Results". National Archives.
- Lampi, Philip J. (n.d.). "Electoral College". A New Nation Votes. American Antiquarian Society.
- Madison, James H. (1986). The Indiana Way: A State History. Bloomington: Indiana University Press.
- Ratcliffe, Donald J. (Spring 2014). "Popular Preferences in the Presidential Election of 1824". Journal of the Early Republic. 34 (1): 45–77. JSTOR 24486931.
- Riker, Dorothy; Thornbrough, Gayle, eds. (1960). Indiana Election Returns, 1816–1851. Indianapolis: Indiana Historical Bureau.
