= List of United States representatives in the 25th Congress =

This is a complete list of United States representatives during the 25th United States Congress listed by seniority.

As an historical article, the districts and party affiliations listed reflect those during the 25th Congress (March 4, 1837 – March 3, 1839). Seats and party affiliations on similar lists for other congresses will be different for certain members.

Seniority depends on the date on which members were sworn into office. Since many members are sworn in on the same day, subsequent ranking is based on previous congressional service of the individual and then by alphabetical order by the last name of the representative.

Committee chairmanship in the House is often associated with seniority. However, party leadership is typically not associated with seniority.

Note: The "*" indicates that the representative/delegate may have served one or more non-consecutive terms while in the House of Representatives of the United States Congress.

== U.S. House seniority list ==
U.S. House seniority
Rank	Representative	Party	District	Seniority date (Previous service, if any)	No.# of term(s)	Notes
1	Lewis Williams	W	NC-13	March 4, 1815	12th term	Dean of the House of Representatives
2	Charles F. Mercer	W	VA-14	March 4, 1817	11th term	
3	Henry William Connor	D	NC-11	March 4, 1821	9th term	
4	John Reed Jr.	W	MA-11	March 4, 1821; Previous service, 1813–1817.	11th term*	
5	Churchill C. Cambreleng	D	NY-03	December 3, 1821	9th term	Left the House in 1839.
6	Elisha Whittlesey	W	OH-16	March 4, 1823	8th term	Resigned on July 9, 1838.
7	James K. Polk	D	TN-09	March 4, 1825	7th term	Speaker of the House; Left the House in 1839.
8	John Bell	W	TN-07	March 4, 1827	6th term	
9	Augustine Henry Shepperd	W	NC-09	March 4, 1827	6th term	Left the House in 1839.
10	Ratliff Boon	D	IN-01	March 4, 1829; Previous service, 1825–1827.	6th term*	Left the House in 1839.
11	Horace Everett	W	VT-03	March 4, 1829	5th term	
12	George Grennell Jr.	W	MA-06	March 4, 1829	5th term	Left the House in 1839.
13	Dixon H. Lewis	D	AL-04	March 4, 1829	5th term	
14	Henry A. P. Muhlenberg	D	PA-09	March 4, 1829	5th term	Resigned on February 9, 1838.
15	Abraham Rencher	W	NC-10	March 4, 1829	5th term	Left the House in 1839.
16	James Israel Standifer	W	TN-04	March 4, 1829; Previous service, 1823–1825.	6th term*	Died on August 20, 1837.
17	George Evans	W	ME-04	July 20, 1829	5th term	
18	John M. Patton	D	VA-13	November 25, 1830	5th term	Resigned on April 7, 1838.
19	John Quincy Adams	W	MA-12	March 4, 1831	4th term	
20	Heman Allen	W	VT-04	March 4, 1831	4th term	Left the House in 1839.
21	George N. Briggs	W	MA-07	March 4, 1831	4th term	
22	Thomas Corwin	W	OH-04	March 4, 1831	4th term	
23	John K. Griffin	D	SC-09	March 4, 1831	4th term	
24	James Iver McKay	D	NC-05	March 4, 1831	4th term	
25	Thomas McKean Thompson McKennan	W	PA-21	March 4, 1831	4th term	Left the House in 1839.
26	John J. Milligan	W	DE	March 4, 1831	4th term	Left the House in 1839.
27	David Potts Jr.	W	PA-04	March 4, 1831	4th term	Left the House in 1839.
28	Francis Thomas	D	MD-06	March 4, 1831	4th term	
29	William Slade	W	VT-02	November 1, 1831	4th term	
30	Micajah Thomas Hawkins	D	NC-06	December 15, 1831	4th term	
31	Hiland Hall	W	VT-01	January 1, 1833	4th term	
32	Jesse Atherton Bynum	D	NC-02	March 4, 1833	3rd term	
33	Zadok Casey	D	IL-02	March 4, 1833	3rd term	
34	John Chaney	D	OH-09	March 4, 1833	3rd term	Left the House in 1839.
35	Edward Darlington	W	PA-04	March 4, 1833	3rd term	Left the House in 1839.
36	Edmund Deberry	W	NC-07	March 4, 1833; Previous service, 1829–1831.	4th term*	
37	James Graham	W	NC-12	March 4, 1833	3rd term	
38	Thomas L. Hamer	D	OH-05	March 4, 1833	3rd term	Left the House in 1839.
39	Isaac McKim	D	MD-04	March 4, 1833; Previous service, 1823–1825.	5th term*	Died on April 1, 1838.
40	Francis Ormand Jonathan Smith	D	ME-02	March 4, 1833	3rd term	Left the House in 1839.
41	William Taylor	D	NY-23	March 4, 1833	3rd term	Left the House in 1839.
42	David Douglas Wagener	D	PA-07	March 4, 1833	3rd term	
43	Taylor Webster	D	OH-02	March 4, 1833	3rd term	Left the House in 1839.
44	Henry A. Wise	W	VA-08	March 4, 1833	3rd term	
45	Levi Lincoln Jr.	W	MA-05	February 17, 1834	3rd term	
46	James Bouldin	D	VA-05	March 15, 1834	3rd term	Left the House in 1839.
47	Rice Garland	W	LA-03	April 28, 1834	3rd term	
48	Henry Johnson	W	LA-01	September 25, 1834	3rd term	Left the House in 1839.
49	Daniel Kilgore	D	OH-19	December 1, 1834	3rd term	Resigned on July 4, 1838.
50	William L. May	D	IL-03	December 1, 1834	3rd term	Left the House in 1839.
51	Stephen C. Phillips	W	MA-02	December 1, 1834	3rd term	Resigned on September 28, 1838.
52	Francis Wilkinson Pickens	D	SC-05	December 8, 1834	3rd term	
53	John Robertson	W	VA-11	December 8, 1834	3rd term	Left the House in 1839.
54	William K. Bond	W	OH-07	March 4, 1835	2nd term	
55	Nathaniel B. Borden	D	MA-10	March 4, 1835	2nd term	Left the House in 1839.
56	Andrew Buchanan	D	PA-20	March 4, 1835	2nd term	Left the House in 1839.
57	John Calhoon	W	KY-06	March 4, 1835; Previous service, 1827.	3rd term*	Left the House in 1839.
58	William B. Calhoun	W	MA-08	March 4, 1835	2nd term	
59	William Blount Carter	W	TN-01	March 4, 1835	2nd term	
60	John Chambers	W	KY-12	March 4, 1835; Previous service, 1828–1829.	3rd term*	Left the House in 1839.
61	Reuben Chapman	D	AL-01	March 4, 1835	2nd term	
62	Timothy Childs	W	NY-28	March 4, 1835; Previous service, 1829–1831.	3rd term*	Left the House in 1839.
63	Robert Craig	D	VA-17	March 4, 1835; Previous service, 1829–1833.	4th term*	
64	Walter Coles	D	VA-06	March 4, 1835	2nd term	
65	Caleb Cushing	W	MA-03	March 4, 1835	2nd term	
66	Samuel Cushman	D	NH	March 4, 1835	2nd term	Left the House in 1839.
67	George Dromgoole	D	VA-04	March 4, 1835	2nd term	
68	John Fairfield	D	ME-01	March 4, 1835	2nd term	Resigned on December 24, 1838.
69	Jacob Fry Jr.	D	PA-05	March 4, 1835	2nd term	Left the House in 1839.
70	James Garland	C	VA-12	March 4, 1835	2nd term	
71	Seaton Grantland	D	GA	March 4, 1835	2nd term	Left the House in 1839.
72	William J. Graves	W	KY-08	March 4, 1835	2nd term	
73	Elisha Haley	D	CT-03	March 4, 1835	2nd term	Left the House in 1839.
74	James Harlan	W	KY-05	March 4, 1835	2nd term	Left the House in 1839.
75	Albert Galliton Harrison	D	MO	March 4, 1835	2nd term	
76	Charles Eaton Haynes	D	GA	March 4, 1835; Previous service, 1825–1831.	5th term*	Left the House in 1839.
77	George W. Hopkins	D	VA-18	March 4, 1835	2nd term	
78	Benjamin Chew Howard	D	MD-04	March 4, 1835; Previous service, 1829–1833.	4th term*	Left the House in 1839.
79	Edward Burd Hubley	D	PA-08	March 4, 1835	2nd term	Left the House in 1839.
80	Samuel Ingham	D	CT-02	March 4, 1835	2nd term	Left the House in 1839.
81	Daniel Jenifer	W	MD-07	March 4, 1835; Previous service, 1831–1833.	3rd term*	
82	Joseph Johnson	D	VA-20	March 4, 1835; Previous service, 1823–1827 and 1833.	5th term**	
83	John W. Jones	D	VA-03	March 4, 1835	2nd term	
84	John Klingensmith Jr.	D	PA-19	March 4, 1835	2nd term	Left the House in 1839.
85	Joab Lawler	W	AL-03	March 4, 1835	2nd term	Died on May 8, 1838.
86	Henry Logan	D	PA-11	March 4, 1835	2nd term	Left the House in 1839.
87	Francis Strother Lyon	W	AL-05	March 4, 1835	2nd term	Left the House in 1839.
88	Joshua L. Martin	D	AL-02	March 4, 1835	2nd term	Left the House in 1839.
89	Samson Mason	W	OH-10	March 4, 1835	2nd term	
90	Abram Poindexter Maury	W	TN-08	March 4, 1835	2nd term	Left the House in 1839.
91	William Montgomery	D	NC-08	March 4, 1835	2nd term	
92	Ely Moore	D	NY-03	March 4, 1835	2nd term	Left the House in 1839.
93	Mathias Morris	W	PA-06	March 4, 1835	2nd term	Left the House in 1839.
94	William S. Morgan	D	VA-21	March 4, 1835	2nd term	Left the House in 1839.
95	George Welshman Owens	D	GA	March 4, 1835	2nd term	Left the House in 1839.
96	James Pearce	W	MD-02	March 4, 1835	2nd term	Left the House in 1839.
97	Lancelot Phelps	D	CT-05	March 4, 1835	2nd term	Left the House in 1839.
98	Eleazer Wheelock Ripley	D	LA-02	March 4, 1835	2nd term	Died on March 2, 1839.
99	David Abel Russell	W	NY-12	March 4, 1835	2nd term	
100	Ebenezer J. Shields	W	TN-10	March 4, 1835	2nd term	Left the House in 1839.
101	John Taliaferro	W	VA-10	March 4, 1835; Previous service, 1801–1803, 1811–1813 and 1824–1831.	8th term***	
102	Isaac Toucey	D	CT-01	March 4, 1835	2nd term	Left the House in 1839.
103	Joseph R. Underwood	W	KY-03	March 4, 1835	2nd term	
104	Joseph Weeks	D	NH	March 4, 1835	2nd term	Left the House in 1839.
105	John White	W	KY-09	March 4, 1835	2nd term	
106	Sherrod Williams	W	KY-04	March 4, 1835	2nd term	
107	Waddy Thompson Jr.	W	SC-06	September 10, 1835	2nd term	
108	Jesse Franklin Cleveland	D	GA	October 5, 1835	2nd term	Left the House in 1839.
109	Thomas Glascock	D	GA	October 5, 1835	2nd term	Left the House in 1839.
110	Hopkins Holsey	D	GA	October 5, 1835	2nd term	Left the House in 1839.
111	Jabez Young Jackson	D	GA	October 5, 1835	2nd term	Left the House in 1839.
112	Thomas T. Whittlesey	D	CT-04	April 29, 1836	2nd term	Left the House in 1839.
113	William Crosby Dawson	W	GA	November 7, 1836	2nd term	
114	Orrin Holt	D	CT-06	December 4, 1836	2nd term	Left the House in 1839.
115	Franklin H. Elmore	D	SC-04	December 10, 1836	2nd term	Left the House in 1839.
116	Archibald Yell	D	AR	December 14, 1836	2nd term	Left the House in 1839.
117	John Peter Richardson II	D	SC-08	December 19, 1836	2nd term	Left the House in 1839.
118	William Herod	W	IN-06	January 25, 1837	2nd term	Left the House in 1839.
119	Isaac E. Crary	D	MI	January 26, 1837	2nd term	
120	James Alexander Jr.	W	OH-11	March 4, 1837	1st term	Left the House in 1839.
121	John W. Allen	W	OH-15	March 4, 1837	1st term	
122	Hugh J. Anderson	D	ME-06	March 4, 1837	1st term	
123	John T. Andrews	D	NY-27	March 4, 1837	1st term	Left the House in 1839.
124	Charles G. Atherton	D	NH	March 4, 1837	1st term	
125	John Bancker Aycrigg	W	NJ	March 4, 1837	1st term	Left the House in 1839.
126	William Beatty	D	PA-23	March 4, 1837	1st term	
127	Andrew Beirne	D	VA-19	March 4, 1837	1st term	
128	Bennet Bicknell	D	NY-23	March 4, 1837	1st term	Left the House in 1839.
129	Richard Biddle	W	PA-22	March 4, 1837	1st term	
130	Samuel Birdsall	D	NY-25	March 4, 1837	1st term	Left the House in 1839.
131	John C. Brodhead	D	NY-07	March 4, 1837; Previous service, 1831–1833.	2nd terms*	Left the House in 1839.
132	Isaac H. Bronson	D	NY-18	March 4, 1837	1st term	Left the House in 1839.
133	Andrew DeWitt Bruyn	D	NY-22	March 4, 1837	1st term	Died on July 27, 1838.
134	John Campbell	W	SC-03	March 4, 1837; Previous service, 1829–1831.	2nd terms*	
135	William B. Campbell	W	TN-06	March 4, 1837	1st term	
136	Timothy J. Carter	D	ME-05	March 4, 1837	1st term	Died on March 14, 1838.
137	Richard Cheatham	W	TN-11	March 4, 1837	1st term	Left the House in 1839.
138	Jonathan Cilley	D	ME-03	March 4, 1837	1st term	Died on February 24, 1838.
139	John C. Clark	D	NY-21	March 4, 1837; Previous service, 1827–1829.	2nd terms*	
140	William K. Clowney	D	SC-07	March 4, 1837; Previous service, 1833–1835.	2nd terms*	Left the House in 1839.
141	Robert B. Cranston	W	RI	March 4, 1837	1st term	
142	John Wesley Crockett	W	TN-12	March 4, 1837	1st term	
143	Edward Curtis	W	NY-03	March 4, 1837	1st term	
144	Thomas Davee	D	ME-08	March 4, 1837	1st term	
145	Edward Davies	W	PA-04	March 4, 1837	1st term	
146	John I. De Graff	D	NY-11	March 4, 1837; Previous service, 1827–1829.	2nd terms*	Left the House in 1839.
147	John Dennis	W	MD-01	March 4, 1837	1st term	
148	Alexander Duncan	D	OH-01	March 4, 1837	1st term	
149	George Hedford Dunn	W	IN-04	March 4, 1837	1st term	Left the House in 1839.
150	John Edwards	D	NY-15	March 4, 1837	1st term	Left the House in 1839.
151	John Ewing	W	IN-02	March 4, 1837	1st term	Left the House in 1839.
152	James Farrington	D	NH	March 4, 1837	1st term	Left the House in 1839.
153	Millard Fillmore	W	NY-32	March 4, 1837; Previous service, 1833–1835.	2nd terms*	
154	Isaac Fletcher	D	VT-05	March 4, 1837	1st term	
155	Richard Fletcher	W	MA-01	March 4, 1837	1st term	Left the House in 1839.
156	Henry A. Foster	D	NY-17	March 4, 1837	1st term	Left the House in 1839.
157	Albert Gallup	D	NY-10	March 4, 1837	1st term	Left the House in 1839.
158	Patrick Gaines Goode	W	OH-03	March 4, 1837	1st term	
159	William Graham	W	IN-03	March 4, 1837	1st term	Left the House in 1839.
160	Abraham P. Grant	D	NY-17	March 4, 1837	1st term	Left the House in 1839.
161	Hiram Gray	D	NY-22	March 4, 1837	1st term	Left the House in 1839.
162	William Halstead	W	NJ	March 4, 1837	1st term	Left the House in 1839.
163	Robert Hanna Hammond	D	PA-16	March 4, 1837	1st term	
164	Alexander Harper	W	OH-12	March 4, 1837	1st term	Left the House in 1839.
165	Francis Jacob Harper	D	PA-03	March 4, 1837	1st term	Died on March 18, 1837.
166	William S. Hastings	W	MA-09	March 4, 1837	1st term	
167	Richard Hawes	W	KY-10	March 4, 1837	1st term	
168	Thomas Henry	W	PA-24	March 4, 1837	1st term	
169	Ogden Hoffman	W	NY-03	March 4, 1837	1st term	
170	Robert M. T. Hunter	W	VA-09	March 4, 1837	1st term	
171	William H. Hunter	D	OH-14	March 4, 1837	1st term	Left the House in 1839.
172	Thomas B. Jackson	D	NY-01	March 4, 1837	1st term	
173	William Cost Johnson	W	MD-05	March 4, 1837; Previous service, 1833–1835.	2nd term*	
174	Nathaniel Jones	D	NY-06	March 4, 1837	1st term	
175	Gouverneur Kemble	D	NY-04	March 4, 1837	1st term	
176	Daniel Parkhurst Leadbetter	D	OH-13	March 4, 1837	1st term	
177	Hugh S. Legaré	D	SC-01	March 4, 1837	1st term	Left the House in 1839.
178	Andrew W. Loomis	W	OH-17	March 4, 1837	1st term	Resigned on October 20, 1837.
179	Arphaxed Loomis	D	NY-16	March 4, 1837	1st term	Left the House in 1839.
180	Francis Mallory	W	VA-01	March 4, 1837	1st term	Left the House in 1839.
181	Richard P. Marvin	W	NY-31	March 4, 1837	1st term	
182	James Murray Mason	D	VA-15	March 4, 1837	1st term	Left the House in 1839.
183	John Patterson Bryan Maxwell	W	NJ	March 4, 1837	1st term	Left the House in 1839.
184	Abraham McClellan	D	TN-02	March 4, 1837	1st term	
185	Robert McClellan	D	NY-08	March 4, 1837	1st term	Left the House in 1839.
186	Charles McClure	D	PA-13	March 4, 1837	1st term	Left the House in 1839.
187	Richard Menefee	W	KY-11	March 4, 1837	1st term	Left the House in 1839.
188	John Miller	D	MO	March 4, 1837	1st term	
189	Charles F. Mitchell	W	NY-33	March 4, 1837	1st term	
190	Calvary Morris	W	OH-06	March 4, 1837	1st term	
191	John L. Murray	D	KY-01	March 4, 1837	1st term	Left the House in 1839.
192	William H. Noble	D	NY-24	March 4, 1837	1st term	Left the House in 1839.
193	Joseph C. Noyes	W	ME-07	March 4, 1837	1st term	Left the House in 1839.
194	Charles Ogle	W	PA-18	March 4, 1837	1st term	
195	Amasa J. Parker	D	NY-20	March 4, 1837	1st term	Left the House in 1839.
196	John Palmer	D	NY-13	March 4, 1837; Previous service, 1817–1819.	2nd terms*	Left the House in 1839.
197	William Parmenter	D	MA-04	March 4, 1837	1st term	
198	William Patterson	W	NY-29	March 4, 1837	1st term	Died on August 14, 1838.
199	Lemuel Paynter	D	PA-01	March 4, 1837	1st term	
200	Luther C. Peck	W	NY-30	March 4, 1837	1st term	
201	Isaac S. Pennybacker	D	VA-16	March 4, 1837	1st term	Left the House in 1839.
202	David Petrikin	D	PA-15	March 4, 1837	1st term	
203	Arnold Plumer	D	PA-25	March 4, 1837	1st term	Left the House in 1839.
204	John Pope	W	KY-07	March 4, 1837	1st term	
205	William Wilson Potter	W	PA-14	March 4, 1837	1st term	
206	Zadock Pratt	D	NY-08	March 4, 1837	1st term	Left the House in 1839.
207	John Holmes Prentiss	D	NY-19	March 4, 1837	1st term	
208	Joseph Fitz Randolph	W	NJ	March 4, 1837	1st term	
209	James Rariden	W	IN-05	March 4, 1837	1st term	
210	Luther Reily	W	PA-10	March 4, 1837	1st term	Left the House in 1839.
211	Robert Rhett	D	SC-02	March 4, 1837	1st term	
212	Joseph Ridgway	W	OH-08	March 4, 1837	1st term	
213	Francis E. Rives	D	VA-02	March 4, 1837	1st term	
214	Edward Rumsey	W	KY-02	March 4, 1837	1st term	Left the House in 1839.
215	Samuel Tredwell Sawyer	W	NC-01	March 4, 1837	1st term	Left the House in 1839.
216	John Sergeant	W	PA-02	March 4, 1837; Previous service, 1815–1823 and 1828–1829.	6th terms**	
217	Daniel Sheffer	D	PA-12	March 4, 1837	1st term	Left the House in 1839.
218	Charles Biddle Shepard	W	NC-04	March 4, 1837	1st term	
219	Matthias Shepler	D	OH-18	March 4, 1837	1st term	Left the House in 1839.
220	Mark H. Sibley	W	NY-26	March 4, 1837	1st term	Left the House in 1839.
221	Adam W. Snyder	D	IL-01	March 4, 1837	1st term	Left the House in 1839.
222	James B. Spencer	D	NY-14	March 4, 1837	1st term	Left the House in 1839.
223	William Wright Southgate	W	KY-13	March 4, 1837	1st term	Left the House in 1839.
224	Edward Stanly	W	NC-03	March 4, 1837	1st term	
225	Archibald Stuart	D	VA-07	March 4, 1837	1st term	Left the House in 1839.
226	Charles C. Stratton	W	NJ	March 4, 1837	1st term	Left the House in 1839.
227	Joseph L. Tillinghast	W	RI	March 4, 1837	1st term	
228	Obadiah Titus	D	NY-05	March 4, 1837	1st term	Left the House in 1839.
229	George Washington Toland	W	PA-02	March 4, 1837	1st term	
230	George W. Towns	D	GA	March 4, 1837; Previous service, 1835–1836.	2nd terms*	Left the House in 1839.
231	Hopkins L. Turney	D	TN-05	March 4, 1837	1st term	
232	Abraham Vanderveer	D	NY-02	March 4, 1837	1st term	Left the House in 1839.
233	Henry Vail	D	NY-09	March 4, 1837	1st term	Left the House in 1839.
234	Albert Smith White	W	IN-07	March 4, 1837	1st term	Left the House in 1839.
235	Christopher Harris Williams	W	TN-13	March 4, 1837	1st term	
236	Jared W. Williams	D	NH	March 4, 1837	1st term	
237	Joseph Lanier Williams	W	TN-03	March 4, 1837	1st term	
238	John Tolley Hood Worthington	D	MD-03	March 4, 1837; Previous service, 1831–1833.	2nd terms*	
239	Thomas Jones Yorke	W	NJ	March 4, 1837	1st term	Left the House in 1839.
	Charles Naylor	W	PA-03	June 29, 1837	1st term	
	John Francis Hamtramck Claiborne	D	MS	July 18, 1837; Previous service, 1835–1837.	2nd terms*	Resigned on February 5, 1838.
	Samuel J. Gholson	D	MS	July 18, 1837; Previous service, 1836–1837.	2nd terms*	Resigned on February 5, 1838.
	Samuel Wells Morris	D	PA-17	September 4, 1837	1st term	
	William Stone	W	TN-04	September 14, 1837	1st term	Left the House in 1839.
	Charles D. Coffin	W	OH-17	December 20, 1837	1st term	Left the House in 1839.
	George May Keim	D	PA-09	March 17, 1838	1st term	
	John P. Kennedy	W	MD-04	April 25, 1838	1st term	Left the House in 1839.
	Linn Banks	D	VA-13	April 28, 1838	1st term	
	Edward Robinson	W	ME-03	April 28, 1838	1st term	Left the House in 1839.
	Virgil D. Parris	D	ME-05	May 29, 1838	1st term	
	Seargent Smith Prentiss	W	MS	May 29, 1838	1st term	Left the House in 1839.
	Thomas J. Word	W	MS	May 29, 1838	1st term	Left the House in 1839.
	George Whitfield Crabb	W	AL-03	September 3, 1838	1st term	
	Harvey Putnam	W	NY-29	November 7, 1838	1st term	Left the House in 1839.
	Cyrus Beers	D	NY-22	December 3, 1838	1st term	Left the House in 1839.
	Joshua R. Giddings	W	OH-16	December 3, 1838	1st term	
	Henry Swearingen	D	OH-19	December 3, 1838	1st term	
	Leverett Saltonstall I	W	MA-02	December 5, 1838	1st term	

== Delegates ==
Rank	Delegate	Party	District	Seniority date (Previous service, if any)	No.# of term(s)	Notes
1	George Wallace Jones	D	WI	January 26, 1837; Previous service, 1835–1837.	3rd term*	
2	Charles Downing	D	FL	March 4, 1837	1st term	
	William W. Chapman	D	IA	September 10, 1838	1st term	
	James Duane Doty	D	WI	January 14, 1839	1st term	

== See also ==
- 25th United States Congress
- List of United States congressional districts
- List of United States senators in the 25th Congress
