= List of United States senators in the 24th Congress =

This is a complete list of United States senators during the 24th United States Congress listed by seniority from March 4, 1835, to March 3, 1837.

Order of service is based on the commencement of the senator's first term. Behind this is former service as a senator (only giving the senator seniority within their new incoming class), service as vice president, a House member, a cabinet secretary, or a governor of a state. The final factor is the population of the senator's state.

Senators who were sworn in during the middle of the two-year congressional term (up until the last senator who was not sworn in early after winning the November 1836 election) are listed at the end of the list with no number.

== Terms of service ==
Class	Terms of service of senators that expired in years
Class 3	Terms of service of senators that expired in 1837 (AL, AR, CT, GA, IL, IN, KY, LA, MD, MO, NC, NH, NY, OH, PA, SC, and VT.)
Class 1	Terms of service of senators that expired in 1839 (CT, DE, IN, MA, MD, ME, MO, MS, NJ, NY, OH, PA, RI, TN, VA, and VT)
Class 2	Terms of service of senators that expired in 1841 (AL, AR, DE, GA, IL, KY, LA, MA, ME, MS, NC, NH, NJ, RI, SC, TN, and VA.)

== U.S. Senate seniority list ==
U.S. Senate seniority
Rank	Senator (party-state)	Seniority date	Other factors
1	William Rufus de Vane King (J-AL)	December 14, 1819	
2	Nehemiah Rice Knight (AJ-RI)	January 9, 1821	
3	Thomas Hart Benton (D-MO)	August 10, 1821	
4	William Hendricks (AJ-IN)	March 4, 1825	Former representative
5	Elias Kent Kane (J-IL)	March 4, 1825	
6	Hugh Lawson White (AJ-TN)	October 28, 1825	
7	Ashur Robbins (AJ-RI)	October 31, 1825	
8	John Tyler (AJ-VA)	March 4, 1827	
9	Daniel Webster (AJ-MA)	June 8, 1827	
10	John Middleton Clayton (AJ-DE)	March 4, 1829	
11	Felix Grundy (D-TN)	October 19, 1829	
12	Bedford Brown (D-NC)	December 9, 1829	
13	Arnold Naudain (AJ-DE)	January 13, 1830	
14	John McCracken Robinson (J-IL)	December 11, 1830	
15	Gideon Tomlinson (AJ-CT)	March 4, 1831	Former representative (8 years); Connecticut 14th in population (1820)
16	Gabriel Moore (J-AL)	March 4, 1831	Former representative (8 years); Alabama 19th in population (1820)
17	Willie Person Mangum (AJ-NC)	March 4, 1831	Former representative (3 years)
18	Thomas Ewing (AJ-OH)	March 4, 1831	Ohio 5th in population (1820)
19	Isaac Hill (D-NH)	March 4, 1831	New Hampshire 15th in population (1820)
20	Samuel Prentiss (AJ-VT)	March 4, 1831	Vermont 16th in population (1820)
21	Henry Clay (AJ-KY)	November 10, 1831	
22	John Tipton (D-IN)	January 3, 1832	
23	John Black (J-MS)	November 12, 1832	
24	John Caldwell Calhoun (N-SC)	December 29, 1832	
25	Silas Wright, Jr. (D-NY)	January 4, 1833	
26	Samuel Lewis Southard (AJ-NJ)	March 4, 1833	Former senator
27	Joseph Kent (AJ-MD)	March 4, 1833	Former representative (10 years)
28	Samuel McKean (J-PA)	March 4, 1833	Former representative (6 years)
29	Benjamin Swift (AJ-VT)	March 4, 1833	Former representative (4 years)
30	Nathaniel Pitcher Tallmadge (J-NY)	March 4, 1833	New York 1st in population (1830)
31	Thomas Morris (J-OH)	March 4, 1833	Ohio 4th in population (1830)
32	Ether Shepley (J-ME)	March 4, 1833	Maine 12th in population (1830)
33	Nathan Smith (J-CT)	March 4, 1833	Connecticut 16th in population (1830)
34	Lewis Fields Linn (J-MO)	October 25, 1833	
35	John Pendleton King (D-GA)	November 21, 1833	
36	William Campbell Preston (N-SC)	November 26, 1833	
37	Alexander Porter (AJ-LA)	December 19, 1833	
38	Benjamin Watkins Leigh (AJ-VA)	February 26, 1834	
39	James Buchanan (D-PA)	December 6, 1834	
40	Alfred Cuthbert (W-MD)	January 12, 1835	
41	Robert Henry Goldsborough (W-MD)	January 13, 1835	
42	John Ruggles (J-ME)	January 20, 1835	
43	John Jordan Crittenden (AJ-KY)	March 4, 1835	Former senator
44	Henry Hubbard (D-NH)	March 4, 1835	Former representative
45	John Davis (AJ-MA)	March 4, 1835	Former governor
46	Garret Dorset Wall (D-NJ)	March 4, 1835	New Jersey 14th in population (1830)
47	Robert John Walker (D-MS)	March 4, 1835	Mississippi 22nd in population (1830)
	John Milton Niles (D-CT)	December 21, 1835	
	William Lee Davidson Ewing (J-IL)	December 30, 1835	
48	Robert Carter Nicholas (J-LA)	January 13, 1836	
	William Cabell Rives (J-VA)	March 4, 1836	
	John Page (J-NH)	June 8, 1836	
	Richard Henry Bayard (AJ-DE)	June 17, 1836	
49	Ambrose Hundley Sevier (J-AR)	September 18, 1836	Former delegate
50	William Savin Fulton (D-AR)	September 18, 1836	
	Robert Strange (J-NC)	December 5, 1836	
	Judah Dana (J-ME)	December 7, 1836	
	Richard Elliott Parker (J-VA)	December 12, 1836	
	John Selby Spence (AJ-MD)	December 31, 1836	
	Thomas Clayton (AJ-DE)	January 9, 1837	
	Alexander Mouton (D-LA)	January 12, 1837	
51	Lucius Lyon (D-MI)	January 26, 1837	Former delegate
52	John Norvell (D-MI)	January 26, 1837	

== See also ==
- 24th United States Congress
- List of United States representatives in the 24th Congress
