= List of United States senators in the 25th Congress =

This is a complete list of United States senators during the 25th United States Congress listed by seniority from March 4, 1837, to March 3, 1839.

Order of service is based on the commencement of the senator's first term. Behind this is former service as a senator (only giving the senator seniority within their new incoming class), service as vice president, a House member, a cabinet secretary, or a governor of a state. The final factor is the population of the senator's state.

Senators who were sworn in during the middle of the two-year congressional term (up until the last senator who was not sworn in early after winning the November 1838 election) are listed at the end of the list with no number.

== Terms of service ==
Class	Terms of service of senators that expired in years
Class 1	Terms of service of senators that expired in 1839 (CT, DE, IN, MA, MD, ME, MI, MO, MS, NJ, NY, OH, PA, RI, TN, VA, and VT.)
Class 2	Terms of service of senators that expired in 1841 (AL, AR, DE, GA, IL, KY, LA, MA, ME, MI, MS, NC, NH, NJ, RI, SC, TN, and VA.)
Class 3	Terms of service of senators that expired in 1843 (AL, AR, CT, GA, IL, IN, KY, LA, MD, MO, NC, NH, NY, OH, PA, SC, and VT.)

== U.S. Senate seniority list ==
U.S. Senate seniority
Rank	Senator (party-state)	Seniority date	Other factors
1	William Rufus de Vane King (D-AL)	December 14, 1819	
2	Nehemiah Rice Knight (W-RI)	January 9, 1821	
3	Thomas Hart Benton (D-MO)	August 10, 1821	
4	Hugh Lawson White (W-TN)	October 28, 1825	
5	Ashur Robbins (W-RI)	October 31, 1825	
6	Daniel Webster (W-MA)	June 8, 1827	
7	Felix Grundy (D-TN)	October 19, 1829	
8	Bedford Brown (D-NC)	December 9, 1829	
9	John McCracken Robinson (D-IL)	December 11, 1830	
10	Samuel Prentiss (AJ-VT)	March 4, 1831	
11	Henry Clay (W-KY)	November 10, 1831	
12	John Tipton (D-IN)	January 3, 1832	
13	John Black (W-MS)	November 12, 1832	
14	John Caldwell Calhoun (D-SC)	December 29, 1832	
15	Silas Wright, Jr. (D-NY)	January 4, 1833	
16	Samuel Lewis Southard (W-NJ)	March 4, 1833	Former senator
17	Joseph Kent (AJ-MD)	March 4, 1833	Former representative (10 years)
18	Samuel McKean (D-PA)	March 4, 1833	Former representative (6 years)
19	Benjamin Swift (AJ-VT)	March 4, 1833	Former representative (4 years)
20	Nathaniel Pitcher Tallmadge (AJ-NY)	March 4, 1833	New York 1st in population (1830)
21	Thomas Morris (J-OH)	March 4, 1833	Ohio 4th in population (1830)
22	Lewis Fields Linn (D-MO)	October 25, 1833	
23	John Pendleton King (D-GA)	November 21, 1833	
24	William Campbell Preston (N-SC)	November 26, 1833	
25	James Buchanan (D-PA)	December 6, 1834	
26	Alfred Cuthbert (D-MD)	January 12, 1835	
27	John Ruggles (D-ME)	January 20, 1835	
28	John Jordan Crittenden (W-KY)	March 4, 1835	Former senator
29	Henry Hubbard (D-NH)	March 4, 1835	Former representative
30	John Davis (W-MA)	March 4, 1835	Former governor
31	Garret Dorset Wall (D-NJ)	March 4, 1835	New Jersey 14th in population (1830)
32	Robert John Walker (D-MS)	March 4, 1835	Mississippi 22nd in population (1830)
33	John Milton Niles (D-CT)	December 21, 1835	
34	Robert Carter Nicholas (D-LA)	January 13, 1836	
35	William Cabell Rives (D-VA)	March 4, 1836	
36	Richard Henry Bayard (AJ-DE)	June 17, 1836	
37	Ambrose Hundley Sevier (D-AR)	September 18, 1836	Former delegate
38	William Savin Fulton (D-AR)	September 18, 1836	
39	Robert Strange (D-NC)	December 5, 1836	
40	Richard Elliott Parker (D-VA)	December 12, 1836	
41	John Selby Spence (W-MD)	December 31, 1836	
42	Thomas Clayton (W-DE)	January 9, 1837	
43	Alexander Mouton (D-LA)	January 12, 1837	
44	Lucius Lyon (D-MI)	January 26, 1837	Former delegate
45	John Norvell (D-MI)	January 26, 1837	
46	Franklin Pierce (D-NH)	March 4, 1837	Former representative (4 years)
47	William Allen (D-OH)	March 4, 1837	Former representative (2 years); Ohio 5th in population (1830)
48	Oliver Hampton Smith (W-IN)	March 4, 1837	Former representative (2 years); Indiana 13th in population (1830)
49	Reuel Williams (D-ME)	March 4, 1837	Maine 12th in population (1830)
50	Perry Smith (D-CT)	March 4, 1837	Connecticut 16th in population (1830)
51	Richard Montgomery Young (D-IL)	March 4, 1837	Illinois 20th in population (1830)
	William Henry Roane (D-VA)	March 14, 1837	
52	John McKinley (D-AL)	Did not qualify	
	Clement Comer Clay (D-AL)	June 19, 1837	
	Wilson Lumpkin (D-GA)	November 22, 1837	
	William Duhurst Merrick (W-MD)	January 4, 1838	
	James Fisher Trotter (D-MS)	January 22, 1838	
	Ephraim Hubbard Foster (W-TN)	September 17, 1838	
	Thomas Hickman Williams (D-MS)	November 12, 1838	

== See also ==
- 25th United States Congress
- List of United States representatives in the 25th Congress
