= Thomas Parker (soldier, born 1753) =

United States Army general

Thomas Parker (1753–1820), was a Virginia planter and military officer who after the American Revolutionary War founded "Soldier's Retreat" plantation adjoining the Shenandoah River in what was then Frederick County but later became Clarke County, Virginia and the site of the Battle of Cool Spring during the American Civil War decades after his death.

== Early and family life ==
Parker was born in 1753 to the former Mary Beale and her planter and lawyer husband, Richard Parker of "Lawfield" plantation in Westmoreland County in the colony of Virginia, who would become a judge.

== Military Career ==
During the American Revolution Parker volunteered for the Patriot cause and attained the rank of captain. He participated in several battles with the 2nd Virginia Regiment and the 9th Virginia Regiment.

He remained in the army following the conflict. By 1799, Parker had become lieutenant-colonel of the 8th Infantry Regiment, but in June 1800 was mustered out of service. He was appointed colonel of the 12th Infantry Regiment in March 1812 and served on the northern frontier under Gen. Wade Hampton as well as commanded defenses at Norfolk. He was commissioned brigadier general in March 1813, and resigned in November of the next year.

== Planter ==
Parker's plantation, that he called "Soldier's Retreat" and which was later known as "the Retreat", lay at the intersection of the Leesburg Pike and the Shenandoah River, west of the Snicker's Gap. In the 1810 census, the last of his life, Parker owned 34 enslaved people. He also served as a justice of the peace (the justices jointly administering counties in that era) and helped found Wickliffe Church

== Personal life ==
He married Sallie Opie in 1798. He survived her and his children.

== Death and legacy ==
Parker died in Frederick County on 24 January 1820. He is buried in the cemetery of historic St. James Episcopal Church in Leesburg, Virginia. His Soldier's Retreat plantation (later simply known as "Retreat" plantation was inherited by his nephew Richard E. Parker, who had served as Lieutenant Colonel of the 35th Virginia Regiment in the War of 1812 and decades as a Jacksonian Democrat served as U.S. Senator and even later on the Virginia Court of Appeals. The plantation would be operated using enslaved labor until after the American Civil War, and was the site of the Battle of Cool Spring on July 17-18, 1864 as Union forces chased Confederate General Jubal Early from the environs of Washington, D.C. It and Wickliffe Chapel are currently on the National Register of Historic Places, with Shenandoah University maintaining part of the former plantation as an environmental education center.
