= John W. A. Sanford Jr. =

American lawyer and politician

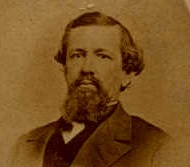
John W. A. Sanford Jr.

John William Augustine Sanford Jr. (November 3, 1825 – August 7, 1913) was a lawyer, Alabama Supreme Court clerk, and Attorney General of Alabama for three terms. He was born in Milledgeville, Georgia. John W. A. Sanford of Georgia was his father.

Sanford Jr. graduated from Oglethorpe University November 13, 1844, with a B.A., Harvard university in 1851 with a B.L., and University of Alabama in 1878 with an LL.D. He was admitted to the bar October 19, 1852. He was a Democrat and supported secession after Abraham Lincoln's election as president. He served as an officer in the Confederate Army. During the war, he wrote to Confederate Attorney General Thomas H. Watts seeking the transfer and promotion of his brother-in-law.

John Sanford Jr. married Sallie Maria Taylor, daughter of Col. William H. Taylor, in Montgomery, Alabama on March 7, 1860. They had a daughter named Valine and a son named John W. A. Sanford III. Their son would marry Minnie Smoot in Mobile, Alabama. John Sanford Jr. and his wife had several grandchildren.

He attended the Alabama Constitutional Convention of 1901. In 1895, John Sanford Jr. designed the current flag of Alabama.
