= 24th United States Congress =

1835-1837 U.S. Congress

←	23rd	25th	→
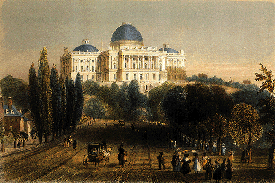
- United States Capitol (1827)

Overview
- Legislative body: United States Congress
- Jurisdiction: United States
- Term: March 4, 1835 – March 4, 1837

Senate
- Members: 52
- President: Martin Van Buren (J)
- President pro tempore: William R. King (J)
- Party control: National Republican during first session, Jacksonian during second session

House of Representatives
- Members: 242 representatives 3 non-voting delegates
- Speaker: James K. Polk (J)
- Party control: Jacksonian

Sessions
- 1st: December 7, 1835 – July 4, 1836
- 2nd: December 5, 1836 – March 3, 1837

The 24th United States Congress was a meeting of the legislative branch of the United States federal government, consisting of the United States Senate and the United States House of Representatives. It met in Washington, D.C. from March 4, 1835, to March 4, 1837, during the seventh and eighth years of Andrew Jackson's presidency. The apportionment of seats in the House of Representatives was based on the 1830 United States census. Both chambers had a Jacksonian majority.

== Tensions with France ==
Throughout 1835, relations between the United States and France reached an all-time low. Andrew Jackson had America's ambassador to France travel aboard a gunboat and after negotiations broke down had the American ambassador recalled to the United States and forced the French ambassador to leave. President Jackson and the French government traded threats and insults throughout the duration of the year. In this conflict, President Jackson got support from many members of the House of Representatives.

In late November 1835, Linn Boyd, Albert G. Hawes, Richard M. Johnson, John E. Coffee, Seaton Grantland, Charles Eaton Haynes, Jabez Young Jackson, George Welshman Owens, Thomas Glascock, William Schley, Reuben Chapman, Joshua L. Martin, Joab Lawler, Jesse Atherton Bynum, Jesse Speight, James Iver McKay, Micajah Thomas Hawkins, William Montgomery, Henry William Connor and James Rogers (congressman) all put in writing that if President Jackson were to ask for a formal declaration of war on France, he would have their full support. Shortly after this when the government of the United Kingdom sought to intervene, the same twenty Congressmen signed a letter stating that they welcomed the "wholesome and moderating influence" of British Prime Minister William Lamb, 2nd Viscount Melbourne, British foreign secretary Henry John Temple, 3rd Viscount Palmerston and the British Secretary of State for War and the Colonies Charles Grant, 1st Baron Glenelg, who the letter referred to as "our thoughtful cousins." The same document referred to the France's leader Louis Philippe I as "dastardly and pusinallimous."

Senators Bedford Brown, Robert J. Walker, Felix Grundy, John Pendleton King and Alfred Cuthbert all wrote to President Jackson saying that they felt the same way as the aforementioned twenty members of the house "with respects to our relations with Britain and France" and "any potential war" that might break out between the United States and France. In a series of popular outbursts in July 1836, effigies of Louis Philippe I were burnt in Georgia, South Carolina, North Carolina, Kentucky, Tennessee, Alabama and Mississippi.

In October 1836, it became known the French were "backing down," celebrations that were "overtly triumphant" and "distinctly anti-French" were held throughout Kentucky, Tennessee, North Carolina, Georgia, Alabama and Mississippi during the last two weeks of October 1836.

== Major events ==
- December 28, 1835: The Second Seminole War began. Seminole fighter Osceola and his warriors attack government agent Thompson outside Fort King in central Florida.
- 1835: Toledo War fought between Ohio and Michigan Territory over the city of Toledo and the Toledo Strip.
- February 3, 1836: United States Whig Party held its first convention in Albany, New York.
- February 23, 1836: Siege of the Alamo began in San Antonio, Texas.
- July 11, 1836: President Andrew Jackson issued the Specie Circular, beginning the failure of the land speculation economy that would lead to the Panic of 1837.
- July 13, 1836: United States patent #1 was granted after filing 9,957 unnumbered patents.
- November 3 – December 7, 1836: 1836 presidential election: Martin Van Buren defeated William Henry Harrison, but Virginia's electors refused to vote for Van Buren's running mate, Richard Mentor Johnson, thereby denying victory to any vice presidential candidate.
- December 4, 1836: Whig Party held its first national convention, in Harrisburg, Pennsylvania.
- December 15, 1836: 1836 U.S. Patent Office fire
- February 8, 1837: Richard Mentor Johnson defeated Francis Granger to win the (first and to date only) contingent election for Vice President of the United States.

== Major legislation ==
- July 4, 1836: Patent Act of 1836, Pub. L. 24–357, 5 Stat. 117
- Mar 3, 1837: Eighth and Ninth Circuits Act of 1837, Pub. L. 24–34, 5 Stat. 176

== Treaties ==
- December 29, 1835: Treaty of New Echota signed, ceding all the lands of the Cherokee east of the Mississippi to the United States

== States admitted and territories formed ==
- June 15, 1836: Arkansas admitted as the 25th state 5 Stat. 50
- July 3, 1836: Wisconsin Territory established; approved April 20, 1836 5 Stat. 10
- January 26, 1837: Michigan admitted as the 26th state 5 Stat. 144; contingently approved June 15, 1836 5 Stat. 49

== Party summary ==
The count below identifies party affiliations at the beginning of the first session of this congress. Changes resulting from subsequent replacements are shown below in the "Changes in membership" section.

=== Senate ===
National Republicans held the Senate in the first Congressional session; Jacksonians flipped the Senate before the start of the second Congressional session and held that Senate majority for the remainder of the Congressional term.

During this congress two Senate seats were added for each of the new states of Arkansas and Michigan.

	Party (shading shows control)			Total	Vacant
	National Republican (NR)	Jacksonian (J)	Nullifier (N)	Total	Vacant
End of previous congress	26	20	2	48	0
Begin	24	21	2	47	1
End	19	31	2	52	0
Final voting share	36.5%	59.6%	3.8%		
Beginning of next congress	19 (Note: as Whigs)	33 (Note: as Democrats)	0	52	0

=== House of Representatives ===
During this congress one House seat was added for each of the new states of Arkansas and Michigan.

	Party (shading shows control)					Total	Vacant
	National Republican (NR)	Anti- Masonic (AM)	Jacksonian (J)	Nullifier (N)	States' Rights (SR)	Total	Vacant
End of previous congress	64	26	141	8	0	239	1
Begin	75	16	140	7	0	238	2
End	79	15	139	7	1	241	1
Final voting share	32.8%	6.2%	57.7%	2.9%	0.4%		
Beginning of next congress	100 (Note: as Whigs)	7	121 (Note: as Democrats)	6	0	234	0

== Leadership ==
Senate leadership

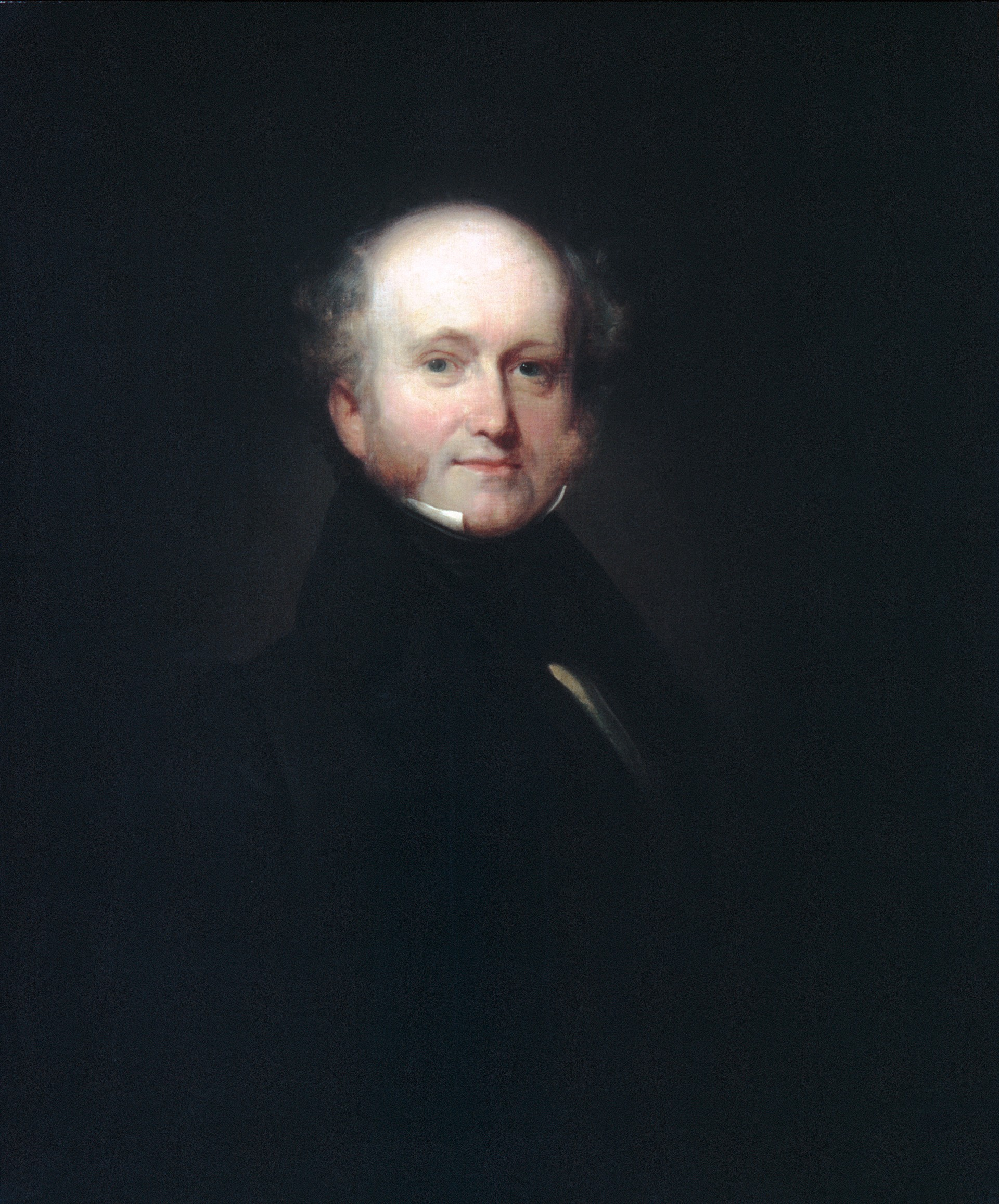
Senate President
Martin Van Buren

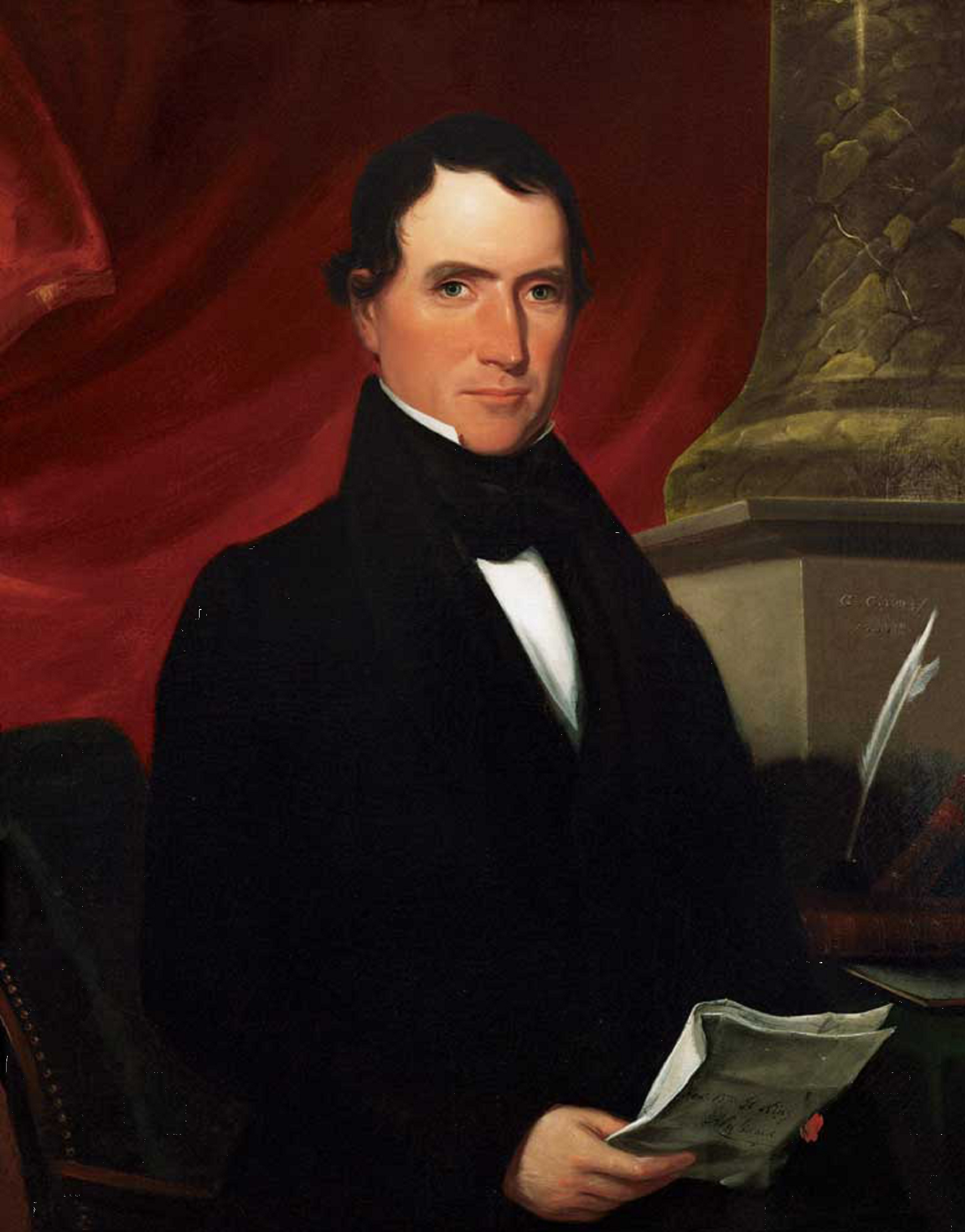
President pro tempore
William R. King

=== Senate ===
- President: Martin Van Buren (J)
- President pro tempore: William R. King (J)

=== House of Representatives ===
- Speaker: James K. Polk (J)

== Members ==
This list is arranged by chamber, then by state. Senators are listed by class, and representatives are listed by district.

Skip to House of Representatives, below

=== Senate ===
Senators were elected by the state legislatures every two years, with one-third beginning new six-year terms with each Congress. Preceding the names in the list below are Senate class numbers, which indicate the cycle of their election. In this Congress, Class 1 meant their term began in the last Congress, requiring re-election in 1838; Class 2 meant their term began with this Congress, requiring re-election in 1840; and Class 3 meant their term ended with this Congress, requiring re-election in 1836.

==== Alabama ====
▌2. William R. King (J)
▌3. Gabriel Moore (NR)

==== Arkansas ====
▌2. William S. Fulton (J), from September 18, 1836 (newly admitted state)
▌3. Ambrose H. Sevier (J), from September 18, 1836 (newly admitted state)

==== Connecticut ====
▌1. Nathan Smith (NR), until December 6, 1835

▌John M. Niles (J), from December 21, 1835

▌3. Gideon Tomlinson (NR)

==== Delaware ====
▌1. Arnold Naudain (NR), until June 16, 1836

▌Richard H. Bayard (NR), from June 17, 1836

▌2. John M. Clayton (NR), until December 29, 1836

▌Thomas Clayton (NR), from January 9, 1837

==== Georgia ====
▌2. John P. King (J)
▌3. Alfred Cuthbert (J)

==== Illinois ====
▌2. John M. Robinson (J)
▌3. Elias K. Kane (J), until December 12, 1835

▌William L. D. Ewing (J), from December 30, 1835

==== Indiana ====
▌1. John Tipton (J)
▌3. William Hendricks (NR)

==== Kentucky ====
▌2. John J. Crittenden (NR)
▌3. Henry Clay (NR)

==== Louisiana ====
▌2. Robert C. Nicholas (J), from January 13, 1836
▌3. Alexander Porter (NR), until January 5, 1837

▌Alexander Mouton (J), from January 12, 1837

==== Maine ====
▌1. Ether Shepley (J), until March 3, 1836

▌Judah Dana (J), from December 7, 1836

▌2. John Ruggles (J)

==== Maryland ====
▌1. Joseph Kent (NR)
▌3. Robert H. Goldsborough (NR), until October 5, 1836

▌John S. Spence (NR), from December 31, 1836

==== Massachusetts ====
▌1. Daniel Webster (NR)
▌2. John Davis (NR)

==== Michigan ====
▌1. Lucius Lyon (J), from January 26, 1837 (newly admitted state)
▌2. John Norvell (J), from January 26, 1837 (newly admitted state)

| class="col-break " |

==== Mississippi ====
▌1. John Black (NR)
▌2. Robert J. Walker (J)

==== Missouri ====
▌1. Thomas H. Benton (J)
▌3. Lewis F. Linn (J)

==== New Hampshire ====
▌2. Henry Hubbard (J)
▌3. Isaac Hill (J), until May 30, 1836

▌John Page (J), from June 8, 1836

==== New Jersey ====
▌1. Samuel L. Southard (NR)
▌2. Garret D. Wall (J)

==== New York ====
▌1. Nathaniel P. Tallmadge (J)
▌3. Silas Wright Jr. (J)

==== North Carolina ====
▌2. Bedford Brown (J)
▌3. Willie P. Mangum (NR), until November 26, 1836

▌Robert Strange (J), from December 5, 1836

==== Ohio ====
▌1. Thomas Morris (J)
▌3. Thomas Ewing (NR)

==== Pennsylvania ====
▌1. Samuel McKean (J)
▌3. James Buchanan (J)

==== Rhode Island ====
▌1. Asher Robbins (NR)
▌2. Nehemiah R. Knight (NR)

==== South Carolina ====
▌2. John C. Calhoun (N)
▌3. William C. Preston (N)

==== Tennessee ====
▌1. Felix Grundy (J)
▌2. Hugh Lawson White (NR)

==== Vermont ====
▌1. Benjamin Swift (NR)
▌3. Samuel Prentiss (NR)

==== Virginia ====
▌1. John Tyler (NR), until February 29, 1836

▌William C. Rives (J), from March 4, 1836

▌2. Benjamin W. Leigh (NR), until July 4, 1836

▌Richard E. Parker (J), from December 12, 1836

Senators' party membership by state at the opening of the 24th Congress in March 1835. The senators from Arkansas and Michigan were not seated until later in the Congress. 2 Jacksonians 1 Jacksonian and 1 Anti-Jacksonian 2 Anti-Jacksonians 2 Nullifiers

=== House of Representatives ===
The names of representatives are preceded by their district numbers.

==== Alabama ====
▌1. Reuben Chapman (J)
▌2. Joshua L. Martin (J)
▌3. Joab Lawler (J)
▌4. Dixon H. Lewis (N)
▌5. Francis S. Lyon (NR)

==== Arkansas ====
▌At-large. Archibald Yell (J), from August 1, 1836 (newly admitted state)

==== Connecticut ====
All representatives were elected statewide on a general ticket.

▌At-large. Elisha Haley (J)
▌At-large. Samuel Ingham (J)
▌At-large. Andrew T. Judson (J), until July 4, 1836

▌Orrin Holt (J), from December 5, 1836

▌At-large. Lancelot Phelps (J)
▌At-large. Isaac Toucey (J)
▌At-large. Zalmon Wildman (J), until December 10, 1835

▌Thomas T. Whittlesey (J), from April 29, 1836

==== Delaware ====
▌At-large. John J. Milligan (NR)

==== Georgia ====
All representatives were elected statewide on a general ticket.

▌At-large. John E. Coffee (J), until September 25, 1836

▌William C. Dawson (SR), from November 7, 1836

▌At-large. Seaton Grantland (J)
▌At-large. Charles E. Haynes (J)
▌At-large. Jabez Y. Jackson (J), from October 5, 1835
▌At-large. George W. Owens (J)
▌At-large. John W. A. Sanford (J), until July 25, 1835

▌Thomas Glascock (J), from October 5, 1835

▌At-large. William Schley (J), until July 1, 1835

▌Jesse F. Cleveland (J), from October 5, 1835

▌At-large. James C. Terrell (J), until July 8, 1835

▌Hopkins Holsey (J), from October 5, 1835

▌At-large. George W. B. Towns (J), until September 1, 1836

▌Julius C. Alford (NR), from January 2, 1837

==== Illinois ====
▌1. John Reynolds (J)
▌2. Zadok Casey (J)
▌3. William L. May (J)

==== Indiana ====
▌1. Ratliff Boon (J)
▌2. John W. Davis (J)
▌3. John Carr (J)
▌4. Amos Lane (J)
▌5. Johnathan McCarty (NR)
▌6. George L. Kinnard (J), until November 26, 1836

▌William Herod (NR), from January 25, 1837

▌7. Edward A. Hannegan (J)

==== Kentucky ====
▌1. Linn Boyd (J)
▌2. Albert G. Hawes (J)
▌3. Joseph R. Underwood (NR)
▌4. Sherrod Williams (NR)
▌5. James Harlan (NR)
▌6. John Calhoon (NR)
▌7. Benjamin Hardin (NR)
▌8. William J. Graves (NR)
▌9. John White (NR)
▌10. Chilton Allan (NR)
▌11. Richard French (J)
▌12. John Chambers (NR)
▌13. Richard M. Johnson (J)

==== Louisiana ====
▌1. Henry Johnson (NR)
▌2. Eleazar W. Ripley (J)
▌3. Rice Garland (NR)

==== Maine ====
▌1. John Fairfield (J)
▌2. Francis O. J. Smith (J)
▌3. Jeremiah Bailey (NR)
▌4. George Evans (NR)
▌5. Moses Mason Jr. (J)
▌6. Leonard Jarvis (J)
▌7. Joseph Hall (J)
▌8. Gorham Parks (J)

==== Maryland ====
The 4th district was a plural district with two representatives.

▌1. John N. Steele (NR)
▌2. James A. Pearce (NR)
▌3. James Turner (J)
▌4. Benjamin C. Howard (J)
▌4. Isaac McKim (J)
▌5. George C. Washington (NR)
▌6. Francis Thomas (J)
▌7. Daniel Jenifer (NR)

==== Massachusetts ====
▌1. Abbott Lawrence (NR)
▌2. Stephen C. Phillips (NR)
▌3. Caleb Cushing (NR)
▌4. Samuel Hoar (NR)
▌5. Levi Lincoln Jr. (NR)
▌6. George J. Grennell Jr. (NR)
▌7. George N. Briggs (NR)
▌8. William B. Calhoun (NR)
▌9. William Jackson (AM)
▌10. Nathaniel B. Borden (J)
▌11. John Reed Jr. (AM)
▌12. John Quincy Adams (AM)

==== Michigan ====
▌At-large. Isaac E. Crary (J), from January 26, 1837 (newly admitted state)

==== Mississippi ====
Both representatives were elected statewide on a general ticket.

▌At-large. John F. H. Claiborne (J)
▌At-large. David Dickson (NR), until July 31, 1836

▌Samuel J. Gholson (J), from December 1, 1836

==== Missouri ====
Both representatives were elected statewide on a general ticket.

▌At-large. William H. Ashley (NR)
▌At-large. Albert G. Harrison (J)

==== New Hampshire ====
All representatives were elected statewide on a general ticket.

▌At-large. Benning M. Bean (J)
▌At-large. Robert Burns (J)
▌At-large. Samuel Cushman (J)
▌At-large. Franklin Pierce (J)
▌At-large. Joseph Weeks (J)

==== New Jersey ====
All representatives were elected statewide on a general ticket.

▌At-large. Philemon Dickerson (J), until November 3, 1836

▌William Chetwood (NR), from December 5, 1836

▌At-large. Samuel Fowler (J)
▌At-large. Thomas Lee (J)
▌At-large. James Parker (J)
▌At-large. Ferdinand S. Schenck (J)
▌At-large. William N. Shinn (J)

==== New York ====
There were four plural districts, the 8th, 17th, 22nd & 23rd had two representatives each, the 3rd had four representatives.

▌1. Abel Huntington (J)
▌2. Samuel Barton (J)
▌3. Churchill C. Cambreleng (J)
▌3. Campbell P. White (J), until October 2, 1835

▌Gideon Lee (J), from November 4, 1835

▌3. John McKeon (J)
▌3. Ely Moore (J)
▌4. Aaron Ward (J)
▌5. Abraham Bockee (J)
▌6. John W. Brown (J)
▌7. Nicholas Sickles (J)
▌8. Valentine Efner (J)
▌8. Aaron Vanderpoel (J)
▌9. Hiram P. Hunt (NR)
▌10. Gerrit Y. Lansing (J)
▌11. John Cramer (J)
▌12. David A. Russell (NR)
▌13. Dudley Farlin (J)
▌14. Ransom H. Gillet (J)
▌15. Matthias J. Bovee (J)
▌16. Abijah Mann Jr. (J)
▌17. Samuel Beardsley (J), until March 29, 1836

▌Rutger B. Miller (J), from November 9, 1836

▌17. Joel Turrill (J)
▌18. Daniel Wardwell (J)
▌19. Sherman Page (J)
▌20. William Seymour (J)
▌21. William Mason (J)
▌22. Stephen B. Leonard (J)
▌22. Joseph Reynolds (J)
▌23. William K. Fuller (J)
▌23. William Taylor (J)
▌24. Ulysses F. Doubleday (J)
▌25. Graham H. Chapin (J)
▌26. Francis Granger (NR)
▌27. Joshua Lee (J)
▌28. Timothy Childs (NR)
▌29. George W. Lay (NR)
▌30. Philo C. Fuller (NR), until September 2, 1836

▌John Young (NR), from November 9, 1836

▌31. Abner Hazeltine (NR)
▌32. Thomas C. Love (NR)
▌33. Gideon Hard (NR)

| class="col-break " |

==== North Carolina ====
▌1. William B. Shepard (NR)
▌2. Jesse A. Bynum (J)
▌3. Ebenezer Pettigrew (NR)
▌4. Jesse Speight (J)
▌5. James I. McKay (J)
▌6. Micajah T. Hawkins (J)
▌7. Edmund Deberry (NR)
▌8. William Montgomery (J)
▌9. Augustine H. Shepperd (NR)
▌10. Abraham Rencher (NR)
▌11. Henry W. Connor (J)
▌12. James Graham (NR), until March 29, 1836, and from December 5, 1836
▌13. Lewis Williams (NR)

==== Ohio ====
▌1. Bellamy Storer (NR)
▌2. Taylor Webster (J)
▌3. Joseph H. Crane (NR)
▌4. Thomas Corwin (NR)
▌5. Thomas L. Hamer (J)
▌6. Samuel F. Vinton (NR)
▌7. William K. Bond (NR)
▌8. Jeremiah McLene (J)
▌9. John Chaney (J)
▌10. Samson Mason (NR)
▌11. William Kennon Sr. (J)
▌12. Elias Howell (NR)
▌13. David Spangler (NR)
▌14. William Patterson (J)
▌15. Jonathan Sloane (AM)
▌16. Elisha Whittlesey (NR)
▌17. John Thomson (J)
▌18. Benjamin Jones (J)
▌19. Daniel Kilgore (J)

==== Pennsylvania ====
There were two plural districts, the second had two representatives, the fourth had three representatives.

▌1. Joel B. Sutherland (J)
▌2. James Harper (NR)
▌2. Joseph R. Ingersoll (NR)
▌3. Michael W. Ash (J)
▌4. Edward Darlington (AM)
▌4. William Hiester (AM)
▌4. David Potts Jr. (AM)
▌5. Jacob Fry Jr. (J)
▌6. Mathias Morris (NR)
▌7. David D. Wagener (J)
▌8. Edward B. Hubley (J)
▌9. Henry A. P. Muhlenberg (J)
▌10. William Clark (AM)
▌11. Henry Logan (J)
▌12. George Chambers (AM)
▌13. Jesse Miller (J), until October 30, 1836

▌James Black (J), from December 5, 1836

▌14. Joseph Henderson (J)
▌15. Andrew Beaumont (J)
▌16. Joseph B. Anthony (J)
▌17. John Laporte (J)
▌18. Job Mann (J)
▌19. John J. Klingensmith Jr. (J)
▌20. Andrew Buchanan (J)
▌21. Thomas M. T. McKennan (AM)
▌22. Harmar Denny (AM)
▌23. Samuel S. Harrison (J)
▌24. John Banks (AM), until March 31, 1836

▌John J. Pearson (NR), from December 5, 1836

▌25. John Galbraith (J)

==== Rhode Island ====
Both representatives were elected statewide on a general ticket.

▌At-large. Dutee J. Pearce (AM)
▌At-large. William Sprague III (AM)

==== South Carolina ====
▌1. Henry L. Pinckney (N)
▌2. William J. Grayson (N)
▌3. Robert B. Campbell (N)
▌4. James H. Hammond (N), until February 26, 1836

▌Franklin H. Elmore (N), from December 10, 1836

▌5. Francis W. Pickens (N)
▌6. Waddy Thompson Jr. (NR), from September 10, 1835
▌7. James Rogers (J)
▌8. Richard I. Manning (J), until May 1, 1836

▌John P. Richardson (J), from December 19, 1836

▌9. John K. Griffin (N)

==== Tennessee ====
▌1. William B. Carter (NR)
▌2. Samuel Bunch (NR)
▌3. Luke Lea (NR)
▌4. James I. Standifer (NR)
▌5. John B. Forester (NR)
▌6. Balie Peyton (NR)
▌7. John Bell (NR)
▌8. Abram P. Maury (NR)
▌9. James K. Polk (J)
▌10. Ebenezer J. Shields (NR)
▌11. Cave Johnson (J)
▌12. Adam Huntsman (J)
▌13. William C. Dunlap (J)

==== Vermont ====
▌1. Hiland Hall (NR)
▌2. William Slade (AM)
▌3. Horace Everett (NR)
▌4. Heman Allen (NR)
▌5. Henry F. Janes (AM)

==== Virginia ====
▌1. George Loyall (J)
▌2. John Y. Mason (J), until January 11, 1837
▌3. John W. Jones (J)
▌4. George C. Dromgoole (J)
▌5. James W. Bouldin (J)
▌6. Walter Coles (J)
▌7. Nathaniel H. Claiborne (NR)
▌8. Henry A. Wise (J)
▌9. John Roane (J)
▌10. John Taliaferro (NR)
▌11. John Robertson (NR)
▌12. James Garland (J)
▌13. John M. Patton (J)
▌14. Charles F. Mercer (NR)
▌15. Edward Lucas (J)
▌16. James M. H. Beale (J)
▌17. Robert Craig (J)
▌18. George W. Hopkins (J)
▌19. William McComas (NR)
▌20. Joseph Johnson (J)
▌21. William S. Morgan (J)

==== Non-voting members ====
▌Arkansas Territory. Ambrose H. Sevier (J), until June 15, 1836
▌Florida Territory. Joseph M. White (J)
▌Michigan Territory. George Wallace Jones (J), until January 26, 1837
▌Wisconsin Territory. George Wallace Jones (J), from January 26, 1837

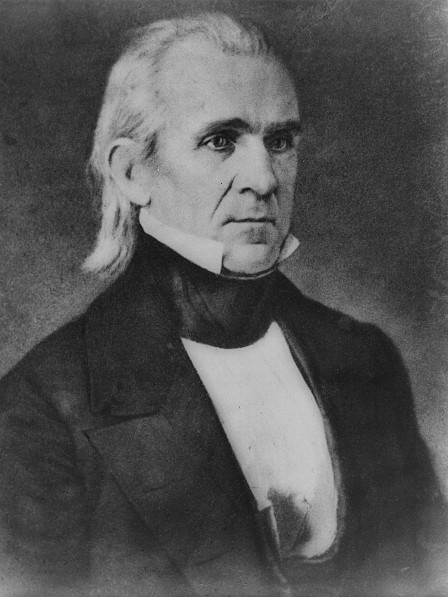
Speaker of the House James K. Polk

== Changes in membership ==
The count below reflects changes from the beginning of the first session of this Congress.

=== Senate ===
- Replacements: 11
  - National Republicans: 5-seat net loss
  - Jacksonians: 10-seat net gain
- Deaths: 3
- Resignations: 8
- Interim appointments: 0
- Seats of newly admitted states: 4
- Total seats with changes: 16

Senate changes
State (class)	Vacated by	Reason for change	Successor	Date of successor's formal installation (Note: When seated or oath administered, not necessarily when service began.)
Louisiana (2)	Vacant	Senator-elect Charles E.A. Gayarre had resigned on account of ill-health. Successor was elected January 13, 1836.	Robert C. Nicholas (J)	January 13, 1836
Connecticut (1)	Nathan Smith (NR)	Died December 6, 1835; Successor was elected December 21, 1835.	John M. Niles (J)	December 21, 1835.
Illinois (3)	Elias Kane (J)	Died December 12, 1835; Successor was appointed December 30, 1835.	William Lee D. Ewing (J)	December 30, 1835
Virginia (1)	John Tyler (NR)	Resigned February 29, 1836; Successor was elected March 4, 1836.	William C. Rives (J)	March 4, 1836
Maine (1)	Ether Shepley (J)	Resigned March 3, 1836; Successor was appointed December 7, 1836.	Judah Dana (J)	December 7, 1836
New Hampshire (3)	Isaac Hill (J)	Resigned May 30, 1836, to become Governor of New Hampshire. Successor was elected June 8, 1836.	John Page (J)	June 8, 1836
Delaware (1)	Arnold Naudain (NR)	Resigned June 16, 1836; Successor was elected June 17, 1836.	Richard H. Bayard (NR)	June 17, 1836
Virginia (2)	Benjamin W. Leigh (NR)	Resigned July 4, 1836; Successor was elected December 12, 1836.	Richard E. Parker (J)	December 12, 1836
Arkansas (2)	New seats	Arkansas was admitted to the Union. Its new senators were elected September 18, 1836.	William S. Fulton (J)	September 18, 1836.
Arkansas (3)	New seats	Arkansas was admitted to the Union. Its new senators were elected September 18, 1836.	Ambrose H. Sevier (J)	September 18, 1836.
Maryland (3)	Robert H. Goldsborough (NR)	Died October 5, 1836; Successor was elected December 31, 1836.	John S. Spence (NR)	December 31, 1836
North Carolina (3)	Willie P. Mangum (NR)	Resigned November 26, 1836; Successor was elected December 5, 1836.	Robert Strange (J)	December 5, 1836
Delaware (2)	John M. Clayton (NR)	Resigned December 29, 1836; Successor was elected January 9, 1837.	Thomas Clayton (NR)	January 9, 1837
Louisiana (3)	Alexander Porter (NR)	Resigned January 5, 1837, due to ill health. Successor was elected January 12, 1837.	Alexandre Mouton (J)	January 12, 1837
Michigan (1)	New seats	Michigan was admitted to the Union. Its new senators were elected January 6, 1837.	Lucius Lyon (J)	January 26, 1837.
Michigan (2)	New seats	Michigan was admitted to the Union. Its new senators were elected January 6, 1837.	John Norvell (J)	January 26, 1837.

=== House of Representatives ===
- Replacements: 18
  - National Republicans: 5-seat net gain
  - Anti-Masonics: 1-seat net loss
  - Jacksonians: 2-seat net loss
  - Nullifiers: No net change
- Deaths: 5
- Resignations: 13
- Contested election: 0
- Seats of newly admitted states: 2
- Total seats with changes: 24

House changes
District	Vacated by	Reason for change	Successor	Date of successor's formal installation
South Carolina 6	Vacant	Rep. Warren R. Davis died during previous congress	Waddy Thompson Jr. (NR)	Seated September 10, 1835
Georgia at-large	Vacant	Rep. James M. Wayne resigned in previous congress	Jabez Y. Jackson (J)	Seated October 5, 1835
Georgia at-large	William Schley (J)	Resigned July 1, 1835 when nominated for Governor of Georgia.	Jesse F. Cleveland (J)	Seated October 5, 1835
Georgia at-large	James C. Terrell (J)	Resigned July 8, 1835, due to ill health	Hopkins Holsey (J)	Seated October 5, 1835
Georgia at-large	John W. A. Sanford (J)	Resigned July 25, 1835, to assist in the Cherokee Indian removal	Thomas Glascock (J)	Seated October 5, 1835
New York 3	Campbell P. White (J)	Resigned October 2, 1835	Gideon Lee (J)	Seated November 4, 1835
Connecticut at-large	Zalmon Wildman (J)	Died December 10, 1835	Thomas T. Whittlesey (J)	Seated April 29, 1836
South Carolina 4	James H. Hammond (N)	Resigned February 26, 1836, because of ill health	Franklin H. Elmore (N)	Seated December 10, 1836
New York 17	Samuel Beardsley (J)	Resigned March 29, 1836	Rutger B. Miller (J)	Seated November 9, 1836
North Carolina 12	James Graham (NR)	Seat declared vacant March 29, 1836	James Graham (NR)	Seated December 5, 1836
Pennsylvania 24	John Banks (AM)	Resigned March 31, 1836	John J. Pearson (NR)	Seated December 5, 1836
South Carolina 8	Richard I. Manning (J)	Died May 1, 1836	John P. Richardson (J)	Seated December 19, 1836
Arkansas Territory at-large	Ambrose H. Sevier (J)	Seat was eliminated when Arkansas achieved statehood June 15, 1836		
Connecticut at-large	Andrew T. Judson (J)	Resigned July 4, 1836 to become judge of the United States District Court for the District of Connecticut.	Orrin Holt (J)	Seated December 5, 1836
Mississippi at-large	David Dickson (NR)	Died July 31, 1836	Samuel J. Gholson (J)	Seated December 1, 1836
Arkansas at-large	Vacant	Arkansas was admitted to the Union on June 15, 1836	Archibald Yell (J)	Seated August 1, 1836
Georgia at-large	George W. Towns (J)	Resigned September 1, 1836	Julius C. Alford (NR)	Seated January 2, 1837
New York 30	Philo C. Fuller (NR)	Resigned September 2, 1836	John Young (NR)	Seated November 9, 1836
Georgia at-large	John E. Coffee (J)	Died September 25, 1836	William C. Dawson (NR)	Seated November 7, 1836
Pennsylvania 13	Jesse Miller (J)	Resigned October 30, 1836	James Black (J)	Seated December 5, 1836
New Jersey at-large	Philemon Dickerson (J)	Resigned November 3, 1836 to become Governor of New Jersey.	William Chetwood (NR)	Seated December 5, 1836
Indiana 6	George L. Kinnard (J)	Died November 26, 1836	William Herod (NR)	Seated January 25, 1837
Virginia 2	John Y. Mason (J)	Resigned January 11, 1837	Vacant	Not filled this congress
Michigan Territory at-large	George Wallace Jones (J)	Seat was eliminated when Michigan achieved statehood January 26, 1837		
Michigan at-large	Vacant	Michigan was admitted to the Union on January 26, 1837	Isaac E. Crary (J)	Seated January 26, 1837
Wisconsin Territory at-large	Vacant	Wisconsin Territory was organized on April 3, 1836	George Wallace Jones (J)	Seated January 26, 1837

== Committees ==
Lists of committees and their party leaders.

=== Senate ===
- Agriculture (Chairman: Bedford Brown then John Page)
- Audit and Control the Contingent Expenses of the Senate (Chairman: Samuel McKean)
- Claims (Chairman: Arnold Naudain then Henry Hubbard)
- Commerce (Chairman: Robert Henry Goldsborough then John Davis)
- Constitution of the State of Arkansas (Select)
- Distributing Public Revenue Among the States (Select)
- District of Columbia (Chairman: John Tyler then Joseph Kent)
- Engrossed Bills (Chairman: Ether Shepley then Thomas Morris)
- Finance (Chairman: Daniel Webster then Silas Wright)
- Foreign Relations (Chairman: Henry Clay then James Buchanan)
- Incendiary Publications (Select)
- Indian Affairs (Chairman: Hugh Lawson White then Ambrose Sevier)
- Judiciary (Chairman: John M. Clayton then Felix Grundy)
- Letter from Mr. Poindexter (Select)
- Manufactures (Chairman: Nehemiah Knight)
- Mileage of Members of Congress (Select)
- Military Affairs (Chairman: Thomas Hart Benton)
- Militia (Chairman: John M. Robinson)
- Naval Affairs (Chairman: Samuel Southard then William C. Rives)
- Ohio-Michigan Boundary (Select)
- Patent Office (Select)
- Pensions (Chairman: Gideon Tomlinson)
- Post Office and Post Roads (Chairman: Felix Grundy)
- Private Land Claims (Chairman: John Black then Lewis Linn)
- Public Lands (Chairman: Thomas Ewing then Robert J. Walker)
- Purchasing Boyd Reilly's Gas Apparatus (Select) (Chairman: N/A)
- Revolutionary Claims (Chairman: Gabriel Moore then Bedford Brown)
- Roads and Canals (Chairman: William Hendricks)
- Sale of Public Lands (Select)
- Tariff Regulation (Select)
- Whole

=== House of Representatives ===
- Accounts (Chairman: N/A)
- Agriculture (Chairman: Abraham Bockee)
- Amendment to the Constitution (Select)
- Banks of the District of Columbia (Select)
- Claims (Chairman: N/A)
- Commerce (Chairman: N/A)
- District of Columbia (Chairman: N/A)
- Elections (Chairman: N/A)
- Expenditures in the Navy Department (Chairman: N/A)
- Expenditures in the Post Office Department (Chairman: N/A)
- Expenditures in the State Department (Chairman: N/A)
- Expenditures in the Treasury Department (Chairman: N/A)
- Expenditures in the War Department (Chairman: N/A)
- Expenditures on Public Buildings (Chairman: N/A)
- Foreign Affairs (Chairman: Benjamin C. Howard)
- Indian Affairs (Chairman: N/A)
- Invalid Pensions (Chairman: N/A)
- Judiciary (Chairman: Samuel Beardsley then Francis Thomas)
- Manufactures (Chairman: N/A)
- Military Affairs (Chairman: N/A)
- Militia (Chairman: N/A)
- Naval Affairs (Chairman: N/A)
- Post Office and Post Roads (Chairman: N/A)
- Public Expenditures (Chairman: N/A)
- Public Lands (Chairman: Ratliff Boon)
- Revisal and Unfinished Business (Chairman: N/A)
- Revolutionary Claims (Chairman: N/A)
- Roads and Canals (Chairman: N/A)
- Rules (Select)
- Standards of Official Conduct
- Territories (Chairman: N/A)
- Ways and Means (Chairman: Churchill C. Cambreleng)
- Whole

=== Joint committees ===
- Enrolled Bills
- The Library

== Employees ==
- Librarian of Congress: John Silva Meehan

=== Senate ===
- Chaplain: Frederick Winslow Hatch (Episcopalian), until December 23, 1835
  - Edward Y. Higbee (Episcopalian), elected December 23, 1835
  - John R. Goodman (Episcopalian), elected December 28, 1836
- Secretary: Walter Lowrie until December 11, 1836
  - Asbury Dickins, elected December 12, 1836
- Sergeant at Arms: John Shackford

=== House of Representatives ===
- Chaplain: Edward Dunlap Smith (Presbyterian), until December 7, 1835
  - Thomas H. Stockton (Methodist), elected December 7, 1835
  - Oliver C. Comstock (Baptist), elected December 5, 1836
- Clerk: Walter S. Franklin
- Doorkeeper: Overton Carr
- Sergeant at Arms: Thomas B. Randolph, until December 15, 1835
  - Roderick Dorsey, elected December 15, 1835
- Postmaster: William J. McCormick

== See also ==
- 1834 United States elections (elections leading to this Congress)
  - 1834–35 United States Senate elections
  - 1834–35 United States House of Representatives elections
- 1836 United States elections (elections during this Congress, leading to the next Congress)
  - 1836 United States presidential election
  - 1836–37 United States Senate elections
  - 1836–37 United States House of Representatives elections
