= John W. A. Sanford =

American politician

Member of the U.S. House of Representatives from Georgia's at-large district
- In office March 4, 1835 – July 25, 1835
- Preceded by: Richard H. Wilde
- Succeeded by: Thomas Glascock

Personal details
- Born: John W. A. Sanford Sr. August 28, 1798 Milledgeville, Georgia, U.S.
- Died: September 12, 1870 (aged 72) Milledgeville, Georgia, U.S.
- Resting place: Memory Hill Cemetery
- Party: Jacksonian Democrat
- Spouse: Mary Ann Ridley
- Children: John W. A. Sanford Jr.
- Education: Yale University

John W. A. Sanford Sr. (August 28, 1798 – September 12, 1870) was a plantation manager, military officer, land agent, and politician from Georgia. He served in the United States House of Representatives from March to July 1835.

== Biography ==
Sanford was born near Milledgeville, Georgia, in 1798. He attended Yale University and was a farmer. In 1832, he was elected a major general, 3rd Division Georgia Militia, by the Georgia Legislature. In 1834, Sanford was elected as a Jacksonian Representative from Georgia to the 24th United States Congress, but he resigned before the end of his term to participate in the removal of the Cherokee from the state. His congressional service spanned from March 4, 1835, to July 2, 1835.

After serving in the Creek War of 1836 as a major general, Sanford was elected to the Georgia Senate in 1837; however, he resigned before that session of the state Senate began. From 1841 to 1843, Sanford was the Secretary of State of Georgia. He also was a member of the state convention of 1850. Sanford served as secession commissioner from Georgia to the State of Texas in 1861. Sanford died in Milledgeville on September 12, 1870, and was buried in Memory Hill Cemetery in Milledgeville.

His Sanford Emigrating Company was contracted to remove Creek Native Americans. He advocated for Americans to own slaves and denounced any laws protecting fugitive slaves as unconstitutional. Sanford testified he owned about 56 slaves.

Sanford married Mary Ann Ridley (born 1802) daughter of Richard Augustus Blount and Mary Edmunds née Dawson Blount. She inherited plantation lands and slaves from her father. His son John W. A. Sanford Jr. later served as Attorney General of Alabama.

== Additional sources ==
- United States Congress. "John W. A. Sanford (id: S000049)". Biographical Directory of the United States Congress.
- Smith, Gordon Burns, History of the Georgia Militia, 1783-1861, Volume One, Campaigns and Generals, Milledgeville: Boyd Publishing, 2000. ASIN:B003L1PRKI.

U.S. House of Representatives
Preceded by Richard Henry Wilde	Member of the U.S. House of Representatives from Georgia's at-large congressional district March 4, 1835 – July 25, 1835	Succeeded by Thomas Glascock
