= James C. Terrell =

American politician (1806–1835)

James C. Terrell (November 7, 1806 – December 1, 1835) was a United States representative and lawyer from Georgia.

Terrell was born in Franklin County, Georgia, in 1806. He attended studied law, gained admittance to the state bar and practiced law in Carnesville, Georgia. He served in the Georgia House of Representatives from 1830 to 1834. He was elected as a Union Representative from Georgia to the 24th United States Congress and served from March 4, 1835, until his resignation on July 8, 1835, due to failing health. He died later that year on December 1, 1835.

U.S. House of Representatives
Preceded by Roger Lawson Gamble	Member of the U.S. House of Representatives from Georgia's at-large congressional district March 4, 1835 – July 8, 1835	Succeeded by Hopkins Holsey
