= John Carr (Indiana politician) =

American politician (1793–1845)

Member of the U.S. House of Representatives from Indiana
- In office March 4, 1831 – March 3, 1837
- Preceded by: Jonathan Jennings (2nd); Johnathan McCarty (3rd)
- Succeeded by: John Ewing (2nd); William Graham (3rd)
- Constituency: 2nd district (1831-33); 3rd district (1833-37)
- In office March 4, 1839 – March 3, 1841
- Preceded by: William Graham
- Succeeded by: Joseph L. White
- Constituency: 3rd district

Personal details
- Born: April 9, 1793 Uniontown, Pennsylvania, U.S.
- Died: January 20, 1845 (aged 51) Charlestown, Indiana, U.S
- Party: Democratic
- Other political affiliations: Jacksonian (before 1839)

Military service
- Allegiance: United States of America
- Branch/service: United States Army
- Rank: Lieutenant
- Unit: United States Army Rangers
- Battles/wars: Battle of Tippecanoe

John Carr (April 9, 1793 – January 20, 1845) was a U.S. representative from Indiana for three terms from 1831 to 1837, then again for a fourth term from 1839 to 1841.

== Biography ==
Carr was born in Uniontown, Pennsylvania. He moved with his parents to Clark County, Indiana, in 1806. There he attended the public schools.

He joined William Henry Harrison's army during Tecumseh's War and fought in the Battle of Tippecanoe in 1811. He remained in the army and was appointed lieutenant in a company of United States Rangers, authorized by an act of Congress for defense of western frontiers, in the War of 1812. He later became a brigadier general and major general of the Indiana Militia which he served in until his death.

He served as clerk of Clark County from 1824 until 1830. He also served as a presidential elector for Andrew Jackson and John C. Calhoun in 1824.

=== Congress ===
Carr was elected as a Jacksonian to the 22nd, 23rd, and 24th Congresses serving from (March 4, 1831 until March 3, 1837). While in the United States House of Representatives he served as chairman of the Committee on Private Land Claims during the 24th Congress. He failed to be reelected in the 1836 election.

Carr was elected as a Democrat to the 26th congress and served from March 4, 1839, until March 3, 1841. He did not seek reelection.

== Death ==
He died in Charlestown, Indiana, January 20, 1845. He was interred in the Old Cemetery.

U.S. House of Representatives
Preceded by Jonathan Jennings	Member of the U.S. House of Representatives from Indiana's 2nd congressional district 1831–1833	Succeeded by John Ewing
Preceded by Johnathan McCarty	Member of the U.S. House of Representatives from Indiana's 3rd congressional district 1833–1837	Succeeded by William Graham
Preceded by William Graham	Member of the U.S. House of Representatives from Indiana's 3rd congressional district 1839–1841	Succeeded by Joseph L. White
