= George L. Kinnard =

American politician

Member of the U.S. House of Representatives from Indiana's 6th district
- In office March 4, 1833 – November 26, 1836
- Preceded by: District created
- Succeeded by: William Herod

County surveyor for Marion County, Indiana
- In office 1831–1835

Member of the Indiana House of Representatives from Marion County
- In office December 3, 1827 – December 6, 1830
- Preceded by: Morris Morris
- Succeeded by: Alexander Wilson Russell

Assessor of Marion County, Indiana
- In office 1826–1827

Personal details
- Born: 1803 Pennsylvania
- Died: November 26, 1836 (aged 32–33) Ohio River
- Party: Jacksonian
- Profession: Law

George L. Kinnard (1803 – November 26, 1836) was a representative from Indiana; born in Pennsylvania in 1803; moved with his widowed mother to Tennessee and completed preparatory studies; moved to Indianapolis, Ind., in 1823; studied law; was admitted to the bar and practised in Marion County, Indiana; assessor for Marion County in 1826 and 1827; member of the State house of representatives 1827–1830; county surveyor 1831–1835; colonel of the State militia; elected as a Jacksonian to the Twenty-third and Twenty-fourth Congresses and served from March 4, 1833, until his death on November 26, 1836; interment probably in Presbyterian Burying Ground (now Washington Park), Cincinnati, Ohio.

In 1829, Kinnard was hired by William Miller, to lay out the town of Eagle Village.

Kinnard was serving in the Indiana General Assembly when legislation was passed on January 29, 1830, providing for the organization of Boone County, Indiana (to be effective on April 1, 1830) Colonel Kinnard was "in on the ground floor" to further developments. Knowing that the new county would need a county seat which would probably be located in or near the unit's geographical center, Kinnard and business partner James Perry Drake busied themselves looking over surveys and records, and found that there were three parcels of land yet available in the very center of the county.

Accordingly, Kinnard and Drake made entry on the three tracts at the Federal land office in Crawfordsville, on March 1, 1830, receiving their "patents" or deeds from the U. S. Government on February 8, 1831. It is assumed that they paid $l.25 an acre for the land, which was then the usual price. One of these tracts contained 62.32 acres, and lay between what is now Fordice and South Streets, and extended east from the meridian line to Park Street. Eighty acres in a second tract lay immediately west of the meridian line, and was bounded on the south by South street, and on the north by Royal and Fordice Streets. Just southwest of this acreage was another eighty which ran from South street to Noble street, and almost to Patterson street on the west.

With the land acquired, it is reasonable to believe that the two set to work at once platting a town on a portion of their holdings. This area, as platted, roughly was bounded on the north by Royal and Fordice streets, on the east by Park Street, on the south by South Street, and on the west by Clark Street. The plat consisted of 12 outlots, 19 blocks exclusive of the public square, and five partial blocks, with the full and partial blocks forming what is known as the "Original Plat" of Lebanon. Each of the 19 blocks was divided into eight lots, each lot being approximately 60 by 120 feet in size. This "Original Plat" extended from a line some thirty feet south of South Street, north to Williams Street, and from a line midway between East and Park streets west to Clark Street.

Despite the assertion made in a letter written many years afterward by a former resident of Boone County that the Indianapolis and Lafayette Road was surveyed and located in 1829, there is good evidence that this was not so. Apparently, the actual surveying was not done until some time in 1831, and after Kinnard and Drake had mapped out the town site which they hoped would become the county seat.

Kinnard, as Marion County's surveyor, surveyed the highway through the wilderness, working northwest from Indianapolis toward Lafayette. When he reached the town plat that he and Drake had set up, he made certain that travelers would not miss the place by the simple expedient of jogging the road west down Main street a distance of some eight blocks, to angle out Lafayette avenue and on northwest toward Lafayette. He did not however foresee the day when a great highway, Interstate 65, would nullify his careful planning by going around his "dream city". From: Birth Certificates of Boone County, Indiana, by Ralph W. Stark, 1979

== Death ==
Kinnard was aboard the steamship Flora, when the two pipes connecting the boilers separated and caused an explosion aboard the ship. Kinnard received injuries that would eventually kill him on November 26, 1836.

== See also ==
- List of members of the United States Congress who died in office (1790–1899)

U.S. House of Representatives
Preceded by District created	Member of the U.S. House of Representatives from Indiana's 6th congressional district 1833–1836	Succeeded by William W. Wick
