= William Graham (Indiana politician) =

American politician

Indiana Territory House of Representatives
- In office 1812–1816
- Succeeded by: Office abolished

Indiana House of Representatives
- In office 1816–1821
- Preceded by: Office created

Indiana House of Representatives
- In office 1821–1833
- Constituency: Jackson County, Indiana

Member of the United States House of Representatives from Indiana's 3rd district
- In office March 4, 1837 – March 3, 1839
- Preceded by: John Carr
- Succeeded by: John Carr

Personal details
- Born: March 16, 1782 At sea
- Died: August 17, 1858 (aged 76) Vallonia, Indiana
- Party: Whig

William Graham (March 16, 1782 – August 17, 1858) was a Speaker of the Indiana House of Representatives and Congressman from Indiana. Born at sea, Graham settled with his parents in Harrodsburg, Kentucky. He attended the public schools. He moved to Vallonia, Indiana, in 1811 and engaged in agricultural pursuits. He was elected to serve as member of the Indiana Territory's house of representatives in 1812 and was elected as delegate from Washington County to the State constitutional convention in 1816. He was elected six times as a member of the Indiana House of Representatives from 1816 until 1821, and was speaker of the house during the 1820-1821 session. He was elected and served four terms in the Indiana Senate from 1821 until 1833, representing Jackson County.

Graham was elected as a Whig to the Twenty-fifth Congress (March 4, 1837 – March 3, 1839). He was an unsuccessful candidate for reelection in 1838 to the Twenty-sixth Congress. Returning home, he resumed agricultural pursuits until his death near Vallonia, Indiana, August 17, 1858. He was interred in the White Church Cemetery, Vallonia, Indiana.

U.S. House of Representatives
Preceded by John Carr	Member of the U.S. House of Representatives from Indiana's 3rd congressional district 1837-1839	Succeeded by John Carr
