= William Herod =

American politician

Member of the U.S. House of Representatives from Indiana's 6th district
- In office January 25, 1837 – March 3, 1839
- Preceded by: George L. Kinnard
- Succeeded by: William W. Wick

Personal details
- Born: March 31, 1801 Bourbon County, Kentucky, U.S.
- Died: October 20, 1871 (aged 70) Columbus, Indiana, U.S
- Party: Whig
- Other political affiliations: Anti-Jacksonian (before 1837)

William Herod (March 31, 1801 – October 20, 1871) was a U.S. representative from Indiana.

Born in Bourbon County, Kentucky, Herod completed preparatory studies. He studied law and was admitted to the bar in Bracken County, Kentucky. Later moved to Columbus, Indiana. He was admitted to the bar in Bartholomew County in 1825 and began practice in Columbus, Indiana. He served as a member of the State house of representatives in 1829, 1830, and 1844. He served in the State senate in 1831–1834, 1845, and 1846.

Herod was elected prosecuting attorney of Bartholomew County and served from 1833 until 1837, when he resigned.

Herod was elected as a Whig to the Twenty-fourth Congress to fill the vacancy caused by the death of George L. Kinnard. He was re-elected to the Twenty-fifth Congress and served from January 25, 1837, to March 3, 1839. He was an unsuccessful candidate for reelection in 1838 to the Twenty-sixth Congress. He resumed the practice of his profession in Columbus, Indiana. He served as clerk of the circuit court of Bartholomew County in 1853. He became a Republican upon the formation of that party. He engaged in the practice of law until he died in Columbus, Indiana, on October 20, 1871. He was interred in City Cemetery.

U.S. House of Representatives
Preceded by George L. Kinnard	Member of the U.S. House of Representatives from Indiana's 6th congressional district January 25, 1837 – March 3, 1839	Succeeded by William W. Wick
