= Richard E. Parker =

American judge

Richard Elliott Parker
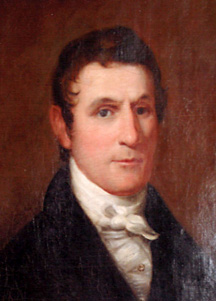

Justice of the Virginia Supreme Court
- In office February 9, 1837 – September 9, 1840

United States Senator from Virginia
- In office December 12, 1836 – March 13, 1837
- Preceded by: Benjamin W. Leigh
- Succeeded by: William H. Roane

Member of the Virginia House of Delegates representing Westmoreland County
- In office December 7, 1807 – December 4, 1808 Serving with Stephen Bailey
- Preceded by: Baldwin M. Lee
- Succeeded by: Peter P. Cox

Personal details
- Born: December 27, 1783 Westmoreland County, Virginia
- Died: September 10, 1840 (aged 56) Bluemont, Virginia
- Party: Democratic
- Spouse: Elizabeth Foushee Parker

Military service
- Allegiance: United States of America
- Rank: Lieutenant colonel
- Unit: 35th Virginia Regiment
- Battles/wars: War of 1812

Richard Elliott Parker (December 27, 1783 – September 9, 1840) was a lawyer, soldier, judge and politician in Virginia. Parker served in the Virginia House of Delegates and the United States Senate, before later serving on the Virginia Supreme Court of Appeals.

== Early and family life ==
Parker was born at "Rock Spring" plantation, Westmoreland County, Virginia, son of Captain William Harwar Parker and Mary (Sturman) Parker. His paternal grandparents were Judge Richard Parker and Elizabeth (Beale) Parker. He studied law under his grandfather Parker at ‘Lawfield,’ his grandfather's residence in Westmoreland County.

== Career ==
After being admitted to the bar, he practiced law in Westmoreland, his native county, which he twice represented in the Virginia House of Delegates, although when he was re-elected the vote contested, and the narrow loser would succeed to the seat in the next election.

During the War of 1812, Parker served as Lieutenant colonel in the Thirty-fifth Virginia Regiment Militia. As such, he was in charge of the defense of the Northern Neck of Virginia from British incursions. On September 16, 1814, Parker was wounded during the British attack that resulted in the burning of Washington.

After the war, Parker returned to private legal practice. The legislature elected him a judge of the general court on July 26, 1817, and he adjudicated in the Norfolk circuit. He moved to west to Frederick County after inheriting a plantation from his uncle, Thomas Parker.

On December 12, 1836, Virginia legislators elected Judge Parker as the United States Senator from Virginia. A Jacksonian, he filled the vacancy caused by the resignation of Benjamin W. Leigh. Parker resigned from the Senate on March 13, 1837, to accept a seat on the Virginia Supreme Court of Appeals (again elected by his former state legislative colleagues). He refused the cabinet office of United States Attorney General offered him by President Van Buren.

== Death and legacy ==
Parker died on his estate, ‘Soldier’s Retreat,’ near Snickersville (now Bluemont, Clarke County), Virginia, September 9, 1840. He was buried alongside his wife, Elizabeth Foushee Parker (1786-1859) at Grace Episcopal Church in Berryville.

U.S. Senate
Preceded by Benjamin W. Leigh	U.S. senator (Class 2) from Virginia; December 15, 1836 – February 13, 1837; Served alongside: William C. Rives	Succeeded by William H. Roane
