= Thomas Glascock =

American politician

Thomas Glascock Jr.

Member of the U.S. House of Representatives from Georgia's at-large district
- In office October 5, 1835 – March 3, 1839
- Preceded by: John W. A. Sanford
- Succeeded by: Mark A. Cooper

38th Speaker of the Georgia House of Representatives
- In office 1833–1834
- Preceded by: Ashbury Hull
- Succeeded by: Joseph Day

Member of the Georgia House of Representatives
- In office 1839–1840
- In office 1834–1835
- In office 1831–1832
- In office 1821–1824
- In office 1817–1818
- In office 1812–1813

Personal details
- Born: October 21, 1790 Augusta, Georgia, U.S.
- Died: May 19, 1841 (aged 50) Decatur, Georgia, U.S.
- Spouse: Catherine Rector

Thomas Glascock Jr. (October 21, 1790 – May 19, 1841) was an American politician, soldier and lawyer. His wife was Catherine Rector.

== Early years ==
Thomas Glascock, Jr. was born in Augusta, Georgia on October 21, 1790, seven years after the end of the American War of Independence. He studied law, gained admission to the state bar, and began practicing law in a career path that would underpin his later political service. Both his father and grandfather had distinguished themselves in military and political service to the new United States. Brigadier General Thomas Glascock Sr. rescued Count Casimir Pulaski from the Siege of Savannah, while serving in Georgia in the Virginia Dragoons during the American Revolution. General Glascock's subsequent appointment as Marshal of Georgia was conferred upon him by President George Washington on May 31, 1794. Thomas Jr's grandfather was Colonel William Glascock, who was acting governor of Georgia for a period during the American Revolution at Augusta. President George Washington stayed with William at the Glascock family plantation in Augusta during his presidency.

== Military service ==
Glascock was as a captain of Volunteers in the War of 1812. He was subsequently commissioned as a brigadier general in the Georgia Militia and served in the First Seminole War in 1817. During that campaign, he served under General Andrew Jackson, later President of the United States. When President James Monroe visited Augusta in 1819, Major General Valentine Walker and General Thomas Glascock took him on a tour of the U.S. Arsenal being constructed beside the Savannah River.

== Political office ==
At the age of 18, Glascock was a delegate to the constitutional convention in 1798. Political offices held by Glascock include the Georgia State House of Representatives (1812, 1817, 1821, 1823, 1831, 1834, 1839) where he also served as speaker in 1833 and 1834. Upon the resignation of John W. A. Sanford, Glascock was elected to fill Sanford's seat in the United States House of Representatives and was reelected in 1836. During his congressional tenure, Glascock served as the chairman of the Committee on Militia.

== Death and legacy ==
After his political career, Glascock lived in Decatur, Georgia and died in that city in 1841. He was buried in the City Cemetery in his birthplace of Augusta. Glascock County, Georgia is named in his honor.

== See also ==
- List of speakers of the Georgia House of Representatives

U.S. House of Representatives
Preceded by John W. A. Sanford	Member of the U.S. House of Representatives from Georgia's at-large congressional district October 5, 1835 – March 3, 1839	Succeeded by Mark A. Cooper
