= James Bruce (merchant) =

American merchant and planter (1763-1837)

- Born: March 20, 1763; Soldiers Rest plantation, Orange County, Colony of Virginia
- Died: May 12, 1837 (aged 74); Philadelphia, Pennsylvania
- Occupations: merchant, planter
- Known for: wealthiest man in Virginia; 3rd wealthiest in USA in his era
- Spouse(s): Sarah Coles; Elvira Cabell Henry
- Children: James Coles Bruce, Charles Bruce and 1 surviving daughter

James Bruce (March 20, 1763 – May 12, 1837), was a Virginia merchant and patriot who became the third wealthiest man in the United States before his death, and whose descendants wielded both political and economic power.

== Early life and education ==
The son of the former Diana Banks and her husband Charles Bruce (d. 1792) was born in Orange County in the colony of Virginia. He was raised at his father's plantation called "Soldier's Rest" (one of several of the same name in the Commonwealth, but of this plantation, only the cemetery survives). His mother died when he was a child, but he had a brother Charles Bruce, who would become his business partner and never married. His father remarried, to Frances Stubblefield. A private tutor educated young Bruce before he was apprenticed to Mr. Colquhoun, a merchant based at Petersburg, the gateway to Southside Virginia and North Carolina.

Some traced his paternal (Bruce) ancestry from George Bruce, who emigrated to Rappahannock County in the Northern Neck by 1668 and died in 1715, with his son and grandson (both named Charles Bruce) moving south and westward to King William and then-vast Orange County. One version ends with his father Charles dying in 1792 at this son's plantation in Halifax County. An alternate version, insists Capt. Charles Bruce died at Soldier's Rest in Orange County in 1792. Yet another version claims this man's grandfather (also James) emigrated from Scotland in the 18th century and his son Charles of Soldiers Rest plantation in Orange County served in the American Revolutionary War out of Winchester.

== Career ==
Bruce became the partner of his Petersburg employer, as well as opened a new branch store in Amelia County. By 1785 Bruce moved southward to Halifax County, where he partnered with his kinsman John Pannill. In 1788 Bruce and Pannill bought 350 acres in Halifax County, beginning an empire that in a decade grew to 1000 acres in Halifax County alone, and which at various times included parcels in Kentucky, Alabama and North Carolina, as well as various Virginia counties. By 1792 Bruce had a business relationship with Isaac Coles who owned about 4,000 acres in Halifax county and would become a congressman. According to a Bruce family member who was able to consult business records which no longer survive, Bruce between 1802 and his death in 1837 owned six (or sixteen) plantations which he operated using enslaved labor to produce tobacco and wheat. Bruce also owned several flour mills, a fertilizer factory and a large blacksmith shop. He also was the managing partner in at least nine stores (others estimate him as owning a dozen stores), which he hired talented entrepreneurs to operate as well as collect debts.

Although wealthy before the War of 1812, Bruce became even wealthier after that war by purchasing tobacco at depressed prices during the conflict and reselling it afterward at great profit.

== Personal life ==
Bruce married twice, each to a woman of higher social standing. On August 1, 1799 Bruce married Sarah Coles (1770-1806), daughter of prominent Halifax County planter and politician Walter Coles. However, of their four children, two sons dies as infants and a daughter died in 1811, so only the youngest, James Coles Bruce, reached adulthood and married. He continued the political as well of economic traditions of his mother's family (representing Halifax County in the Virginia House of Delegates and the Virginia Secession Convention) as well as built the Berry Hill plantation that is now a national landmark (and which includes a memorial to this man his father). In the 1830 census, the last before this man's death, he may have owned 4 enslaved people in Halifax County, but his son James Bruce Jr. owned 59 slaves in that county in that year and hundreds more before the American Civil War.

Bruce remarried more than a decade after his first wife's death, this time in Nelson County, to Elvira Cabell Henry, daughter of prominent planter and politician William Cabell Jr. (1759-1822). She was the widow of Patrick Henry Jr. (who had died less than two years after their marriage in 1804), and would also survive this man. The Bruces initially lived at her Woodburn estate, near the county seat. They had two sons and daughters, but only Charles Bruce and daughter, Ellen Bruce Morson (1820-1862) reached adulthood and married. The son was named for Bruce's unmarried brother Charles Bruce, whose estate he inherited. That Charles Bruce would become one of the wealthiest men in Charlotte County and a state senator, and one of his grandsons (William Cabell Bruce) would become a U.S. Senator (from Maryland), and several more descendants would support the Southern aristocratic tradition into the next century.

== Death and legacy ==
Bruce traveled to Philadelphia, Pennsylvania in January 1837, seeking medical treatment, probably for cancer. Some time in March, his doctors realized he would not recover, and Bruce died on May 12, 1837. A week later, the 'Richmond Whig and Public Advertiser' published an obituary. His estate was admitted to probate and estimated as worth $2,000,000, making him the richest man in Virginia in that era and second only to merchants John Jacob Astor of New York and Stephen Girard of Philadelphia. Bruce also owned several hundred slaves, as well as considerable stock, although not all records have survived. Although Bruce was buried at St. Andrew's Church in Philadelphia, his eldest son erected a monument to his memory at Berry Hill, which is now listed on the National Register of Historic Places.

Documents related to the Bruce family, including the pardon of James' son, Charles Bruce, by President Andrew Johnson, are held by the Manuscripts Division of the Library of Congress. James is the grandfather of U.S. Senator William Cabell Bruce. Letters between Bruce and his son, James Coles Bruce, as well as ledgers of his business, are held by the Special Collections Division of the University of Virginia Library. Other family papers, especially dealing with Bruce's trade in slaves, are held by the Virginia Historical Society. Blueprints used by Bruce to build houses for overseers and slaves at his plantations in Halifax and Charlotte Counties are included in the book Cabin, Quarter, Plantation: Architecture and Landscapes of North American Slavery.
