= Thomas Flournoy =

American politician (1811–1883)

Member of the U.S. House of Representatives from Virginia's 3rd district
- In office March 4, 1847 – March 3, 1849
- Preceded by: William Tredway
- Succeeded by: Thomas H. Averett

Personal details
- Born: Thomas Stanhope Flournoy; December 15, 1811 Prince Edward County, Virginia
- Died: March 12, 1883 (aged 71) Halifax County, Virginia
- Party: Democratic
- Other political affiliations: American (c. 1850–c. 1860); Whig (until c. 1850)
- Education: Hampden-Sydney College
- Profession: lawyer, politician

Military service
- Allegiance: Confederate States
- Branch/service: Confederate States Army
- Rank: Colonel
- Unit: 6th Virginia Cavalry
- Battles/wars: American Civil War; Jackson's Valley Campaign; Battle of Port Republic; Battle of Cross Keys

Thomas Stanhope Flournoy (December 15, 1811 – March 12, 1883) was a Virginia planter, lawyer and politician who represented Halifax County in the Virginia Secession Convention of 1861 after representing Virginia's 3rd congressional district in the United States House of Representatives. Flournoy also had several unsuccessful political campaigns, as well as fought as a cavalry officer in the Confederate States Army during the American Civil War.

== Early and family life ==
Born in Prince Edward County, Virginia, to the former Ann Carrington Cabell (1787-1854) and her husband John James Flournoy. Flournoy had at least one older sister, Anne Eliza Flournoy Wood, and a younger brother, Dr. Patrick Henry Flournoy of Charlotte County. Flournoy received a private education appropriate to his class, and graduated from Hampden-Sydney College. His paternal ancestor Matthew Flournoy (d. 1761) had owned significant property in both Prince Edward, and Halifax Counties before the American Revolutionary War, and may have been descended from John James or Jacob Flournay, the son and nephew of Huguenot refugee Jacques Flournoy who had emigrated to the Virginia Colony from Geneva Switzerland in the 17th century. However, this man's descendants listed their patriot ancestor in that conflict of Judge Paul Carrington (1733-1818) of Charlotte County. In any event, Thomas Flournoy lived at a Halifax County home which Mathew Flournoy had rebuilt after a fire when it had been owned by William Clairborne, but another fire destroyed that home long before 1924.

== Career ==
After completing his formal education at Hampden-Sydney, Flournoy took a job teaching children while also reading law books under the direction of an experienced practitioner (Virginia at the time having no publicly supported schools). Admitted to the bar, Flournoy commenced practice in Halifax, Virginia, in 1834.

Flournoy also operated one or more plantations using enslaved labor. In 1830, Flournoy owned 28 enslaved people in Prince Edward County. In 1840, Flournoy owned 30 enslaved people in Halifax County. It is unclear whether he was the Thomas Flournoy who owned 24 slaves in Charlotte County in 1850. In the last federal census with slave schedules, Flournoy owned 38 enslaved people in Halifax County.

Voters in Virginia's 3rd congressional district elected Flournoy as a Whig to the Thirtieth Congress (March 4, 1847 – March 3, 1849). However, he was not re-elected. In 1848 and likewise in 1850 he lost to Democrat Thomas H. Averett. Flournoy also unsuccessfully ran as the candidate of the American Party for Governor of Virginia in 1855, losing to Jacksonian Democrat Henry A. Wise.

Halifax County voters elected Flournoy and wealthy planter (and former state delegate) James Coles Bruce as their representatives to the Virginia Secession Convention of 1861 at Richmond. Both men voted against secession during the first vote, but for secession at the final vote, after the conflict began at Fort Sumter, South Carolina.

After the First Battle of Manassas in July 1861, Flournoy raised a company of cavalry in Halifax County for the Confederate States Army (some almost as old as he). Initially commissioned as captain of Company G of the 6th Virginia Cavalry, Flournoy was promoted to major on April 15, 1862, and to colonel on July 16, 1862. He participated in Stonewall Jackson's 1862 Valley Campaign and saw action at the battles of Port Republic and Cross Keys. Flournoy resigned on October 15, 1862 because of "domestic difficulties". However, he returned and was wounded in battle in June 1864.

Flournoy campaigned to become Governor of Virginia in 1863, but lost to General "Extra Billy" Smith.

After the war, Flournoy settled in Danville, Virginia, and again practiced law. He served as delegate to the 1876 Democratic National Convention.

== Personal life ==
Flournoy first married on December 30, 1834 or January 1, 1835 to Susan Ann Love, whose father Allen Love, was a local lawyer. The wedding was held at the estate of General Edward C. Carrington in Halifax County, and before her death Susan Flournoy bore six children. After his first wife's death Flournoy remarried, to somewhat distant relative Mildred H. Coles, daughter of Hon. Walter Coles of Pittsylvania County and granddaughter of Paul Carrington of Charlotte County. His son H.W. Flournoy (b. 1846) also fought for the confederacy, and practiced law in Danville until elected judge of the corporation court in June 1870 and was re-elected but resigned in 186, then moved to Washington County in the Commonwealth's southwest corner before being elected secretary of the Commonwealth in 1883 and twice winning re-election.

== Death and legacy ==
Flournoy died at his home in Halifax County, Virginia, March 12, 1883, and was interred in the family plot on his estate.

== Elections ==
- 1847; Flournoy was elected to the U.S. House of Representatives with 51.95% of the vote, defeating Democrat William Marshall Tredway.
- 1849 and 1851; Flournoy was unsuccessful in re-election bids in 1849 and 1851.

Party political offices
First	Know Nothing nominee for Governor of Virginia; 1855	Succeeded by None
U.S. House of Representatives
Preceded by William Tredway	Member of the U.S. House of Representatives from Virginia's 3rd congressional district 1847–1849	Succeeded by Thomas H. Averett
