= James Coles Bruce =

American politician (1806–1865)

Member of the Virginia House of Delegates representing Halifax County
- In office December 1831 – November 30, 1834 Serving with William D. Sims
- Preceded by: Thomas J. Green
- Succeeded by: Henry Carrington

Personal details
- Born: March 20, 1763 Halifax County, Virginia
- Died: March 28, 1865 (aged 102) Berry Hill, Halifax County, Virginia
- Spouse: Eliza Wilkins
- Children: 11, 10 of whom reached adulthood
- Relatives: James Bruce(father); Charles Bruce(half-brother)
- Education: Hampden-Sydney College, University of North Carolina, Harvard University, University of Virginia Law School
- Profession: Planter, politician

James Coles Bruce (January 26, 1806 – March 28, 1865), was an extremely wealthy Virginia planter and politician who twice represented Halifax County in the Virginia House of Delegates as well as in the Virginia Secession Convention of 1861.

== Early life and education ==
The son of the former Sarah Coles (1770-1806) and her wealthy merchant husband James Bruce (1763-1837) was born on one of his father's plantations, probably in Halifax County, Virginia. His maternal grandfather Walter Coles (1739-1780) owned thousands of acres in that county as well as had held political offices, although he died long before the marriage and this boy's birth. An uncle, Isaac Coles continued that family's political activism and was a business partner of the elder James Bruce, as well as bought the plantation this man later improved as Berry Hill. Some traced his paternal (Bruce) ancestry from George Bruce, who emigrated to Rappahannock County in the Northern Neck by 1668 and died in 1715, with his son and grandson (both named Charles Bruce, as would be this man's uncle who died without marrying and bequeathed his property to his brother) moving south and westward to King William and then-vast Orange County, and James Bruce (apprenticed in Petersburg, Virginia) continuing the southern migration with his father Charles who died in 1792 in Halifax County. An alternate version of the paternal ancestry has James Bruce's grandfather (also James) emigrating from Scotland and his son Charles of Soldiers Rest plantation in Orange County (this man's grandfather, and the now-vanished plantation along a ford of the Rapidan River) serving in the American Revolutionary War out of Winchester.

All agree Sarah Coles Bruce died four months after giving birth to this boy. His brothers Alexander and Charles had already died as infants, and his sister Mildred died in 1811. His father remarried in 1819, when this boy was a teenager. The second marriage, to Elvira Cabell Henry (the widow of Patrick Henry Jr., and daughter of charter Hampden-Sydney trustee William Cabell of Union Hill plantation) produced three children, of whom Charles Bruce (1826-1896) and Ellen Carter Bruce Morson (1820-1862) reached adulthood and married. After a private education as befit his class, Bruce was sent to Hampden-Sydney College in 1823 and graduated as a member of the class of 1824. Bruce then traveled to North Carolina and attended the University of North Carolina for a while, before traveling north to Cambridge, Massachusetts where he attended Harvard University in 1826. Bruce returned to Virginia and studied law at the University of Virginia Law School in 1827-1828.

== Career ==
Because of his father's wealth, after his marriage as described below, Bruce lived at his father's Tarover plantation in Halifax County. He also continued traveling to northern cities, as well as wintered in New Orleans, Cuba or the West Indies. When his father died in 1837 (possibly the third wealthiest man in the United States after John Jacob Astor of New York City and Stephen Girard of Philadelphia), Bruce administered the estate, which made both him and his half-brother Charles (later a Virginia state senator) very wealthy men, although other relatives and business partners also received bequests.

=== Planter ===
At least by 1850, if not earlier, Bruce considered himself primarily a planter, although as described below, he also held political offices and left an architectural legacy. It is unclear whether he was admitted to the Virginia bar or practiced law for other clients. In the 1830 census, Bruce owned 59 enslaved people in Halifax County. A decade later Bruce owned at least 110 enslaved people in that county (21 boys and 19 girls 10 years or younger, 20 boys and 16 girls between 11 and 24 years old, 7 men and 7 women between 24 and 35 years old, 10 men and 7 women between 36 and 55 years old, and 4 old men and an elderly woman). In the 1850 census (the first to separately enumerate slaves as well as to name white household members) Bruce owned 247 enslaved people in Halifax county's southern district. In the last slave census (because of slavery's at least nominal demise in the American Civil War), Bruce owned 134 enslaved in Halifax County. Bruce also owned plantations in North Carolina, as well as partnered with James Alexander Seddon and Dr. William Webb Wilkins of Louisiana in two Louisiana plantations called "Ashton" and "Wilton."

=== Politician ===
Halifax County voters elected Bruce and William D. Sims as their representatives to the Virginia House of Delegates in 1831 (replacing Thomas J. Green and Thomas Easley), and re-elected the pair twice before dropping them both in 1834 in favor of Henry Carrington and James Sneed. During all three legislative sessions, Bruce served on the Committee of Schools and Colleges, and long advocated public education as discussed below. His father had served as a member of the Hampden-Sydney Board of Trustees from 1805 at least until 1830.

Bruce's part-time legislative service also occurred during the investigation of Nat Turner's rebellion. Thus he and other members often debated the future of slavery. Quite possibly, at the time, Bruce owned more enslaved people than any other legislator. Bruce delivered a major speech concerning slavery on January 13, 1832. While he considered slavery a necessary evil, Bruce condemned abolitionism as likely to lead to further unrest and slave revolts. During a July 4, 1847 speech to the combined agricultural societies of Mecklenburg County, Virginia and Granville County, North Carolina, in addition to advocating diversified and better agricultural practices, Bruce proposed that planters hold no more than ten enslaved people, and sell the rest (as "dead capital") to reduce the labor force to a size appropriate to its needs, supplementing with paid labor if necessary. While a Virginia legislator, Bruce also supported states rights and South Carolina's attempted nullification of the tariffs imposed by President Andrew Jackson.

Considered a witty orator, Bruce also addressed University of Virginia alumni in 1840 and University of North Carolina alumni in 1841. In an 1853 speech at the Danville Lyceum, Bruce urged a state system of public schools for both young men and women, noting that Virginia lagged behind other states in political power as well as commercial and industrial prosperity.

=== Builder ===
Soon after his father's death, Bruce decided to improve his residence and in 1842 commissioned local architect John Evans Johnson and builder Josiah Dabbs to construct the mansion. Berry Hill plantation, modeled after the Parthenon in Greece, was completed in 1844. Now a state as well as national landmark (and which includes a memorial to his father), it is considered the purest example of the Greek Revival architectural style in Virginia. Johnson would also design the Gothic-inspired Staunton Hill mansion in Charlotte County for his half-brother Charles Bruce, and a mansion now known as Wilde Manor for his son Thomas Bruce after the former plantation house at Tarover burned in the early 1850s.

=== Secessionist ===
As perhaps the wealthiest man in Halifax County (if not the state), Bruce was elected to represent the county during the Virginia Secession Convention of 1861. He served on the important Committee on Federal Relations, as well as delivered several speeches condemning abolitionists and tariffs, and also reiterated his longstanding devotion to states rights. Although Bruce voted against secession on the first vote, he voted for secession on the second vote. Bruce also invested in Confederate war bonds, as well as directly contributed $50,000 to the Confederate war effort. His last public service was president of the board of visitors of the Virginia Military Institute in 1861 and 1862. A family historian, Kathleen Eveleth Bruce, estimated that Bruce had doubled his inheritance and may have been worth $4 million by 1860, but was resigned to the inevitable ruin of his class upon the defeat of the Confederacy.

== Personal life ==
Bruce married Eliza Wilkins, daughter of William Wilkins of North Carolina, on July 21, 1829, and they had eleven children (of whom ten reached adulthood) before she died in 1850. Thus the 1850 census lists the 44 year old Bruce living with his sons Thomas (age 20), Richard (age 19), Alexander (age 17), William B. (age 16), James Jr. (14), Wilkins (age 12) and Charles (age 9), as well as daughter Eliza (age 3). The household also included 21 year old Sally Broadnax and teacher Rufus Murrell (age 36).

== Death and legacy ==
Bruce died at his Berry Hill home shortly before Virginia conceded defeat in the Civil War, and was buried beside his wife in the plantation's cemetery. His will gave a life estate in Berry Hill to his son Alexander (Sandy) Bruce and his wife, after which their children would inherit that plantation. Berry Hill and 2,400 acres of land remained in the family for a century. Their son (this man's grandson) Malcolm Bruce (1869-1948) lived at the plantation through both world wars, after which this man's grandchildren Walter Bruce (then 80 years old and never married) and Ellen Bruce Crane came to own it. After several interventing owners, a French financial firm later bought Berry Hill (and the surrounding 600 acres) and renovated it to become a training center and luxury hotel.

Most of this man's and his father's papers (including account books) were donated by Walter Bruce (who died in 1953) to the Special Collections of the University of Virginia Library. Other family papers (formerly held by his half-brother Charles and especially relating to Charlotte County) are held by the Virginia Historical Society. In 2010, Yale University Press published a book with an essay about the plans this man or his father used to build houses for overseers and slaves at his plantations in Halifax and Charlotte Counties.
