= Berry Hill Plantation =

Historic house in Virginia, United States

- Berry Hill
- U.S. National Register of Historic Places
- U.S. National Historic Landmark
- Virginia Landmarks Register
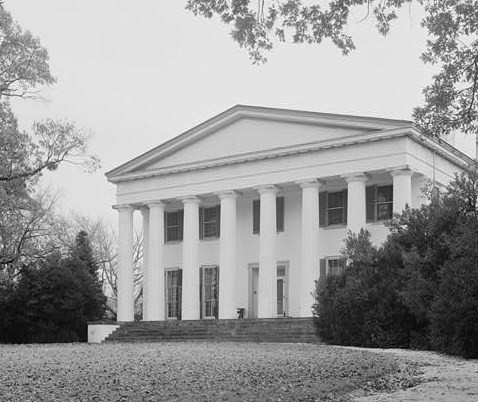
- Berry Hill

- Location within Virginia Location within the United States
- Location: S of jct. of Rtes. 659 and 682, near South Boston, Virginia
- Coordinates: 36°41′55″N 78°56′39″W
- Area: 1,275 acres (516 ha) (landmarked area)
- Built: 1839
- Architect: John E. Johnson
- Architectural style: Greek Revival
- NRHP reference No.: 69000246
- VLR No.: 041-0004

Significant dates
- Added to NRHP: November 25, 1969
- Designated NHL: November 11, 1971
- Designated VLR: November 5, 1968

Berry Hill Plantation, also known simply as Berry Hill, is a historic plantation located on the west side of South Boston in Halifax County, Virginia, United States. The main house, transformed c. 1839 into one of Virginia's finest examples of Greek Revival architecture, was designated a National Historic Landmark in 1969. The surviving portion of the plantation, which was once one of the largest in the state, is now a conference and event center.

== Description and history ==
Berry Hill is located on a site that is now about 650 acres (260 ha) in size, between River Rd. and the Dan River The main house is a two-story brick structure, finished in stucco and topped by a gabled roof. The main facade is in emulation of the Parthenon, with eight massive Doric columns supporting an entablature and fully pedimented gable.

With some 3,600 acres (1,500 ha) at its height, the plantation was one of the largest in Virginia. The plantation has one of the largest slave cemeteries in Virginia, holding the graves of more than two hundred enslaved persons, and includes well-preserved slave quarters.

The plantation was originally owned by Isaac Coles, who began using slaves in 1802. In 1814 and 1841, the plantation changed owners, finally ending up under the control of James Coles Bruce in 1832. Bruce is credited with transforming the existing 18th-century brick plantation house then standing into the Greek Revival mansion seen today. Bruce is believed to have consulted with architect John E. Johnson, who designed Staunton Hill, the mansion of his half-brother.

== Today ==
The main house is now the centerpiece of the Berry Hill Resort and Conference Center, which provides accommodations and event facilities for weddings and corporate events. In 2023, the resort was found to have violated its historic preservation easement by partially demolishing the overseer's house on the property.

== Gallery ==
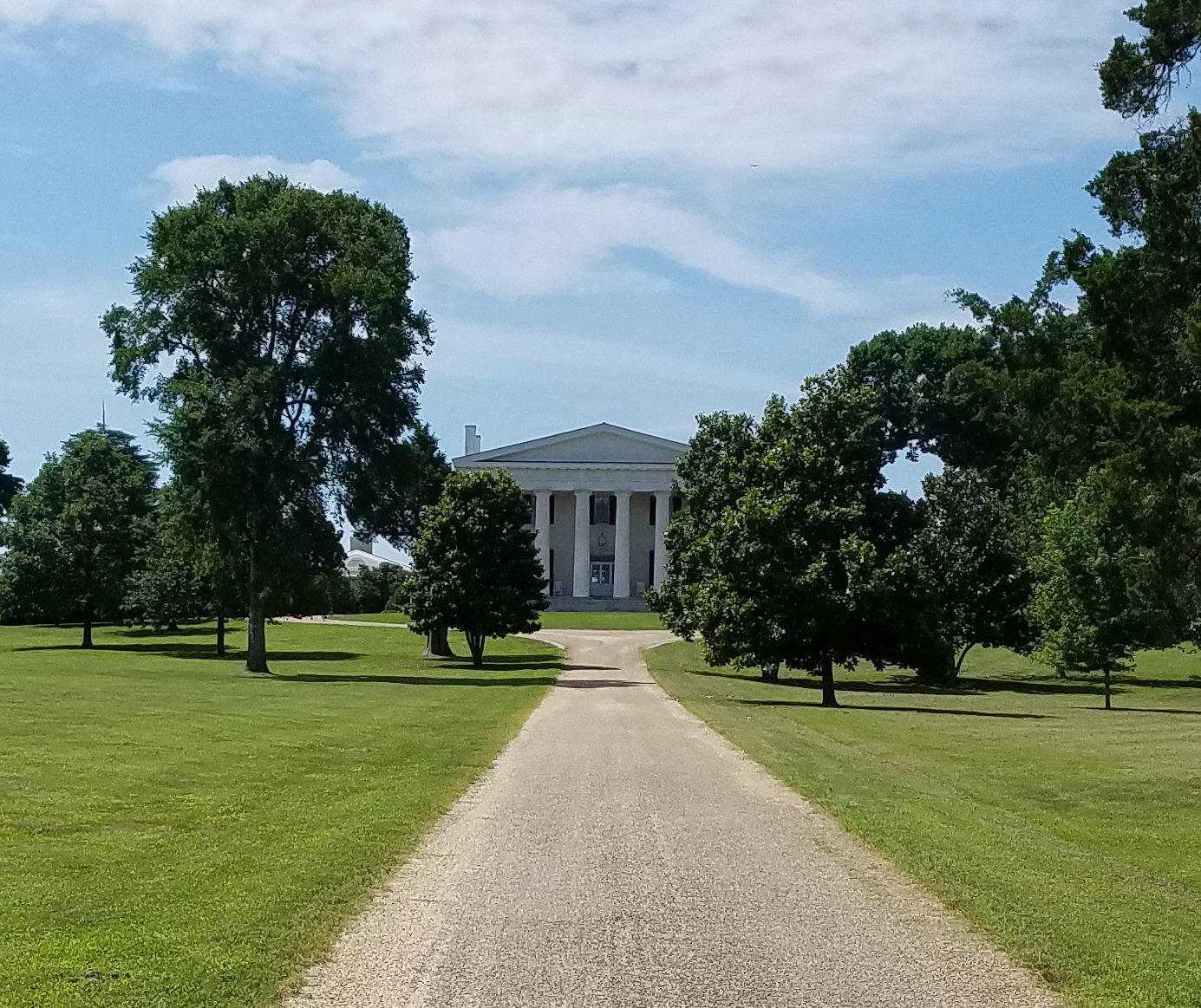
Berry Hill in 2017

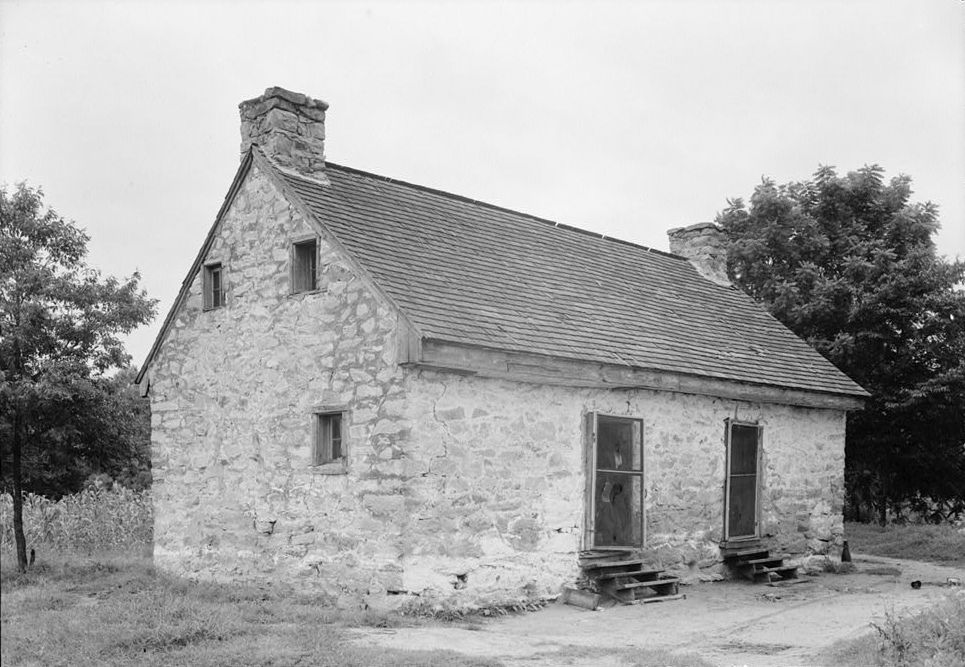
Stone slave quarters

== See also ==
- List of National Historic Landmarks in Virginia
- National Register of Historic Places listings in Halifax County, Virginia
