= Thomas H. Averett =

American politician

Member of the U.S. House of Representatives from Virginia's 3rd district
- In office March 4, 1849 – March 3, 1853
- Preceded by: Thomas Flournoy
- Succeeded by: John Caskie

Member of the Virginia Senate for Mecklenburg and Halifax
- In office December 4, 1848 – March 1849
- Preceded by: Richard H. Baptist
- Succeeded by: Tucker Carrington

Personal details
- Born: Thomas Hamlet Averett; July 10, 1800 Halifax County, Virginia
- Died: June 30, 1855 (aged 54) Halifax County, Virginia
- Party: Democratic
- Education: Jefferson Medical College

Military service
- Allegiance: United States
- Rank: Served as drummer boy
- Battles/wars: War of 1812

Thomas Hamlet Averett (July 10, 1800 – June 30, 1855) was an American medical doctor, slave owner and U.S. representative from Virginia from 1849 to 1853.

== Biography ==
Born near Halifax, Virginia, Averett attended the common schools. He served as a drummer boy in the War of 1812.

He studied medicine. He graduated from Jefferson Medical College, Philadelphia, Pennsylvania, and practiced in Halifax and the adjacent counties.

He served in the State senate in 1848 and 1849. He was an unsuccessful candidate for election in 1846 to the Thirtieth Congress.

=== Congress ===
Averett was elected as a Democrat to the Thirty-first and Thirty-second Congresses (March 4, 1849 – March 3, 1853). During that time, he was responsible for future Confederate cavalry general J.E.B. Stuart's appointment to attend West Point.

He was an unsuccessful candidate for renomination in 1852. He resumed the practice of medicine in Halifax County.

=== Death and burial ===
He died near Halifax Court House, Virginia, June 30, 1855. He was interred in the family burial ground near Halifax Court House.

== Elections ==
- 1849; Averett was elected to the U.S. House of Representatives with 50.75% of the vote, defeating Whig Thomas Stanhope Flournoy.
- 1851; Averett was re-elected with 57.38% of the vote, defeating Whig Flournoy.

== Sources ==
- United States Congress. "Thomas H. Averett (id: A000343)". Biographical Directory of the United States Congress.

U.S. House of Representatives
Preceded by Thomas Flournoy	Member of the U.S. House of Representatives from Virginia's 3rd congressional district 1849–1853	Succeeded by John Caskie
