= John Winston Jones =

American politician

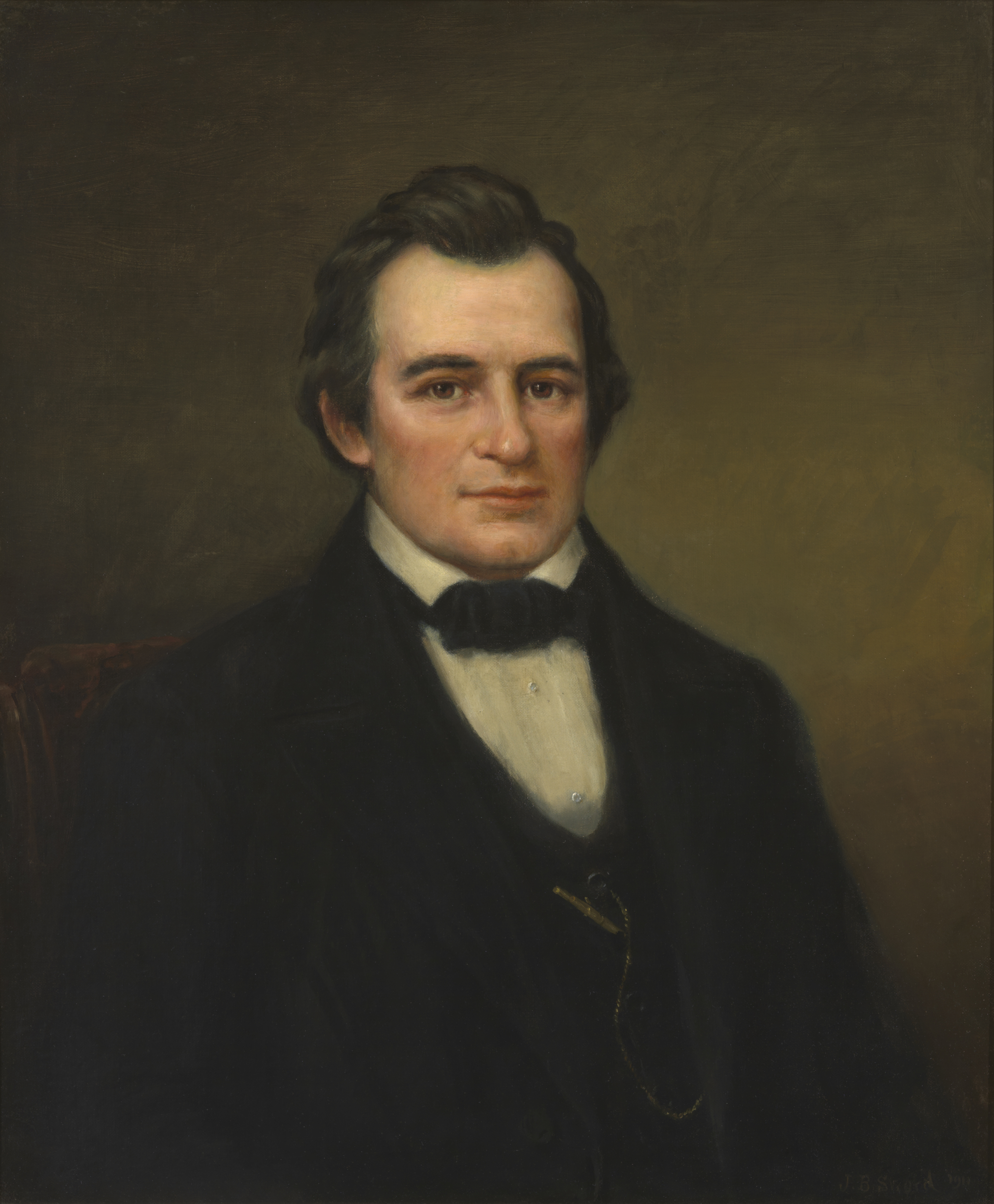
- Portrait of Jones (c. 1911)

16th Speaker of the United States House of Representatives
- In office December 4, 1843 – March 4, 1845
- Preceded by: John White
- Succeeded by: John W. Davis

Leader of the House Democratic Caucus
- In office December 4, 1843 – March 4, 1845
- Preceded by: James K. Polk
- Succeeded by: Howell Cobb

Member of the U.S. House of Representatives from Virginia
- In office March 4, 1835 – March 3, 1845
- Preceded by: William S. Archer (3rd); Walter Coles (6th)
- Succeeded by: Walter Coles (3rd); James Seddon (6th)
- Constituency: 3rd district (1835–43); 6th district (1843–45)

Chairman of the House Ways and Means Committee
- In office March 4, 1839 – March 3, 1841
- Preceded by: Churchill C. Cambreleng
- Succeeded by: Millard Fillmore

22nd Speaker of the Virginia House of Delegates
- In office January 4, 1847 – December 6, 1847
- Governor: William Smith
- Preceded by: William Goode
- Succeeded by: James F. Strother

Member of the Virginia House of Delegates from Chesterfield County
- In office December 7, 1846 – December 17, 1847
- Preceded by: William Winfree
- Succeeded by: Alexander Jones

Personal details
- Born: November 22, 1791 Amelia County, Virginia
- Died: January 29, 1848 (aged 56) Petersburg, Virginia
- Party: Democratic
- Other political affiliations: Democratic-Republican
- Spouse: Harriet Boisseau
- Children: Mary Winston Jones; James Boisseau Jones; Alexander Jones
- Education: College of William & Mary
- Profession: Lawyer

John Winston Jones (November 22, 1791 – January 29, 1848) was an American politician and lawyer. He served five terms in the United States House of Representatives from 1835 to 1845. He served as Speaker of the House in both the U.S. House of Representatives (1843–1845) and the Virginia House of Delegates (1847).

== Early life and education ==
Born November 22, 1791, in Amelia County, Virginia to the former Mary Anne Winston, and her husband, Alexander Jones. A paternal ancestor was Peter Jones, the founder of Petersburg. His name honors Col. John Jones (Peter Jones' son, 1735-1793), who had served in the House of Burgesses for then-vast Brunswick County, supported the American Revolutionary War, then served in the Virginia Senate (including a term as its Speaker) as well as in the Virginia Ratifying Convention of 1788. This John W. Jones received an education appropriate for his class, then traveled to Williamsburg about 1795 for further studies at the College of William & Mary. He received a law degree from the same institution in 1813.

== Early legal career ==
After admission to the Virginia bar, Jones practiced law in Chesterfield County before being appointed Commonwealth Attorney (prosecutor) for Virginia's 5th Judicial Circuit in 1818. He joined Benjamin W. Leigh, Samuel Taylor and William B. Giles as a delegate to the 1829–1830 state constitutional convention, all four men representing a Southside district consisting of Amelia, Chesterfield, Cumberland, Nottoway and Powhatan Counties and the city of Petersburg.

== Congressman ==
Jones was elected as a Democrat to the United States House of Representatives in 1835 and served five terms. As he rose through the ranks of the House, he became chairman of the House Ways and Means Committee, replacing future president Millard Fillmore, and House Democratic Leader, succeeding future president James K. Polk.

Fellow congressmen elected Jones as Speaker of the House during the 28th Congress, which convened in 1843 and adjourned in 1845.

Jones declined nomination for a sixth term in Congress and returned to Virginia in 1845.

== Career after Congress ==
Upon his retirement from Congress, Jones returned to his legal practice and plantation in Virginia. Among his more prominent cases, he served as lead counsel for Thomas Ritchie Jr., who in 1846 faced trial for his involvement in the infamous duel in which abolitionist John Hampden Pleasants was fatally wounded. Ritchie won acquittal on the grounds of self-defense. In the 1830 federal census, John W. Jones owned slaves in Chesterfield County.

That same year, Jones was elected to the Virginia House of Delegates and in 1847 was chosen as Speaker. He was elected to a second term in 1847, but did not attend the session due to illness. He resigned his seat on December 17. The vacant House seat was later filled by his son, Alexander.

== Private life ==
Jones married Harriet Boisseau in 1815 and together they had three children: Mary Winston, James Boisseau and Alexander. His son-in-law was George W.B. Towns, who was the 39th Governor of Georgia from 1847 to 1851.

Jones died on January 29, 1848. He is buried in the family cemetery at his Dellwood Plantation northwest of Petersburg, Virginia.

== Electoral history ==
- 1835; Jones was elected to the U.S. House of Representatives with 68.09% of the vote, defeating Whig William Segar Archer.
- 1837; Jones was re-elected unopposed.
- 1839; Jones was re-elected with 58.51% of the vote, defeating a Whig identified only as Taylor.
- 1841; Jones was re-elected with 69.47% of the vote, defeating Independents Junius E. Leigh and Thomas Miller.
- 1843; Jones was re-elected unopposed.

Political offices
Preceded by John White	Speaker of the United States House of Representatives; 1843–1845	Succeeded by John Wesley Davis
Preceded by William O. Goode	Speaker of the Virginia House of Delegates; 1847	Succeeded by James F. Strother
Preceded by Churchill C. Cambreleng; New York	Chairman of House Ways and Means Committee; 1839–1841	Succeeded by Millard Fillmore; New York
U.S. House of Representatives
Preceded by William S. Archer	Member of the U.S. House of Representatives from Virginia's 3rd congressional district 1835–1843	Succeeded by Walter Coles
Preceded by Walter Coles	Member of the U.S. House of Representatives from Virginia's 6th congressional district 1843–1845	Succeeded by James Seddon
