= Paul C. Edmunds =

American politician

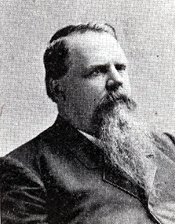

Member of the U.S. House of Representatives from Virginia's 6th district
- In office March 4, 1889 – March 3, 1895
- Preceded by: Samuel I. Hopkins
- Succeeded by: Peter J. Otey

Member of the Virginia Senate from Halifax County
- In office 1882–1889
- Preceded by: J.B. Stovall, Jr.
- Succeeded by: William I. Jordan

Personal details
- Born: November 1, 1836 "Springwood", Halifax Court House, Virginia
- Died: March 12, 1899 (aged 55) Houston, Virginia
- Party: Democratic
- Education: University of Virginia; College of William and Mary
- Profession: Politician, lawyer

Military service
- Allegiance: Confederate States of America
- Branch/service: Confederate Army
- Rank: first lieutenant
- Unit: Montague's battalion
- Battles/wars: American Civil War

Paul Carrington Edmunds (November 1, 1836 – March 12, 1899) was a Virginia lawyer, Confederate soldier and politician who served in the Virginia Senate and in the U.S. representative from Virginia.

== Early and family life ==
Born at "Springwood," a plantation near Halifax Court House, Virginia, to the former Mildred Carrington Coles (1820–1880) and her husband John Richard Edmunds (1812–1873), he could trace his descent from the First Families of Virginia. His brothers were Henry Edmunds (1842–1907) and Edward Carrington Edmunds (1857–1916). After a private teacher, Edmunds attended the University of Virginia at Charlottesville. After graduating in 1855, he began studying law at the College of William and Mary in Williamsburg, Virginia, from which he graduated in 1857.

He married Phoebe Ann Easley (1837-1898) and they had five sons: James Easley Edmunds (1860-1952), John Richard Edmunds (1863-1902), Paul Carrington Edmunds (1865-1915), William Holt Edmunds (1867–1949) and Henry Hurt Edmunds (1869–1958).

== Career ==
He was admitted to the bar the same year and commenced practice in Jefferson City, Missouri. He returned to Virginia in 1859 and engaged in agricultural pursuits on his farm in Halifax County. He served as first lieutenant, Company A, Montague's battalion, in the Confederate States Army during the Civil War. Halifax County voters elected him to the Virginia State senate, where he served two terms, from 1881 to 1888. He served as delegate to the Democratic National Convention in 1884. Edmunds was elected as a Democrat to the Fifty-first, Fifty-second, and Fifty-third Congresses (March 4, 1889 – March 3, 1895). He served as chairman of the Committee on Expenditures in the Department of Agriculture (Fifty-second and Fifty-third Congresses). He declined to be a candidate for renomination in 1894. He died in Houston, Virginia near Halifax, March 12, 1899.

== Death and legacy ==
He was interred in the family plot at St. John's Churchyard, Halifax, Virginia.

== Elections ==
- 1888; Edmunds was elected to the U.S. House of Representatives with 55.6% of the vote, defeating Republican Patrick H. Caull and Independent Democrat Samuel T. Hopkins.
- 1890; Edmunds was re-elected with 92.8% of the vote, defeating Republican William J. Shelburne.
- 1892; Edmunds was re-elected with 58.42% of the vote, defeating Populist Thomas E. Cobbs.

== Sources ==
- United States Congress. "Paul C. Edmunds (id: E000057)". Biographical Directory of the United States Congress.

U.S. House of Representatives
Preceded by Samuel I. Hopkins	Member of the U.S. House of Representatives from Virginia's 6th congressional district 1889–1895	Succeeded by Peter J. Otey
