= Samuel I. Hopkins =

American politician (1843–1914)

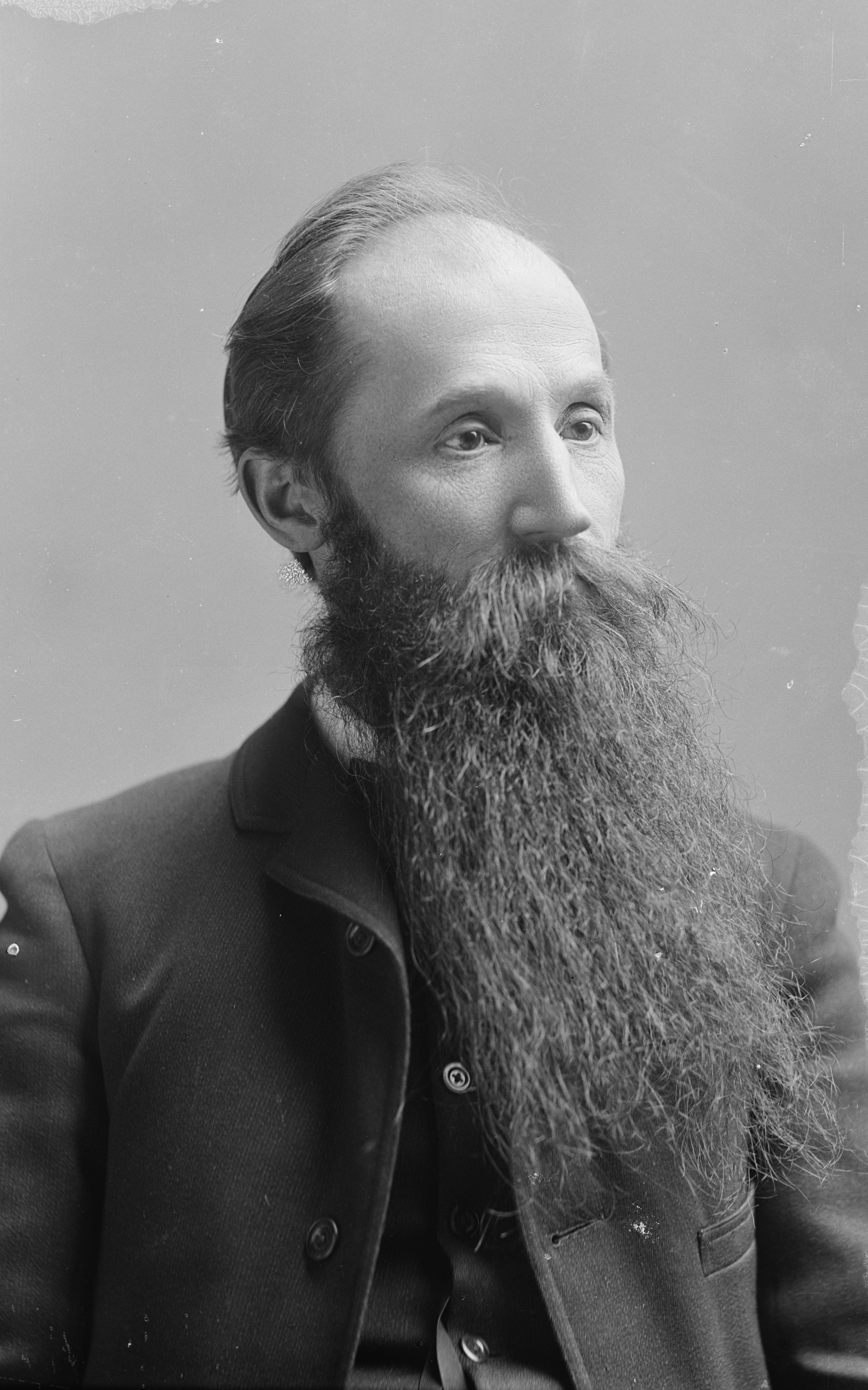
- Portrait c. 1887–1889

Member of the U.S. House of Representatives from Virginia's 6th district
- In office March 4, 1887 – March 3, 1889
- Preceded by: John W. Daniel
- Succeeded by: Paul C. Edmunds

Personal details
- Born: December 12, 1843 Owensville, Maryland, US
- Died: January 15, 1914 (aged 70) Lynchburg, Virginia, US
- Party: Labor
- Profession: Politician, Merchant

Military service
- Allegiance: Confederate States
- Branch/service: Confederate States Army
- Rank: Private
- Unit: 2nd Maryland Infantry
- Battles/wars: American Civil War: Battle of Gettysburg

Samuel Isaac Hopkins (December 12, 1843 – January 15, 1914) was a U.S. representative from Virginia.

== Biography ==
Born near Owensville, Maryland, Hopkins moved to Anne Arundel County with his parents, who settled near Annapolis. He attended the common schools and graduated from Owensville Academy. Hopkins enlisted in Company A, Second Regiment, Maryland Confederate Infantry, during the Civil War and served until he was severely wounded at the Battle of Gettysburg. After the war, he settled in Lynchburg, Virginia, and engaged in mercantile pursuits.

Hopkins was elected as a candidate of the Labor Party to the Fiftieth Congress (March 4, 1887 – March 3, 1889). He declined to be a candidate for renomination in 1888. Hopkins resumed mercantile pursuits in Lynchburg, Virginia, and died there on January 15, 1914. He was interred in Spring Hill Cemetery in Lynchburg.

== Electoral history ==
1886: Hopkins was elected to the U.S. House of Representatives with 51.55% of the vote, defeating Democrat Samuel Griffin.

== Sources ==
- United States Congress. "Samuel I. Hopkins (id: H000779)". Biographical Directory of the United States Congress.

U.S. House of Representatives
Preceded by John W. Daniel	Member of the U.S. House of Representatives from Virginia's 6th congressional district 1887–1889	Succeeded by Paul C. Edmunds
