= Virginia's 6th congressional district =

U.S. House district for Virginia

Coordinates: 38°7′51.6″N 79°2′38″W

- Interactive map of district boundaries since 2023
- Representative: Ben Cline; R–Fincastle
- Distribution: 64.34% urban; 35.66% rural
- Population (2025): 804,908
- Median household income: $76,443
- Ethnicity: 78.1% White; 7.9% Hispanic; 7.8% Black; 4.0% Two or more races; 1.6% Asian; 0.6% other
- Cook PVI: R+12

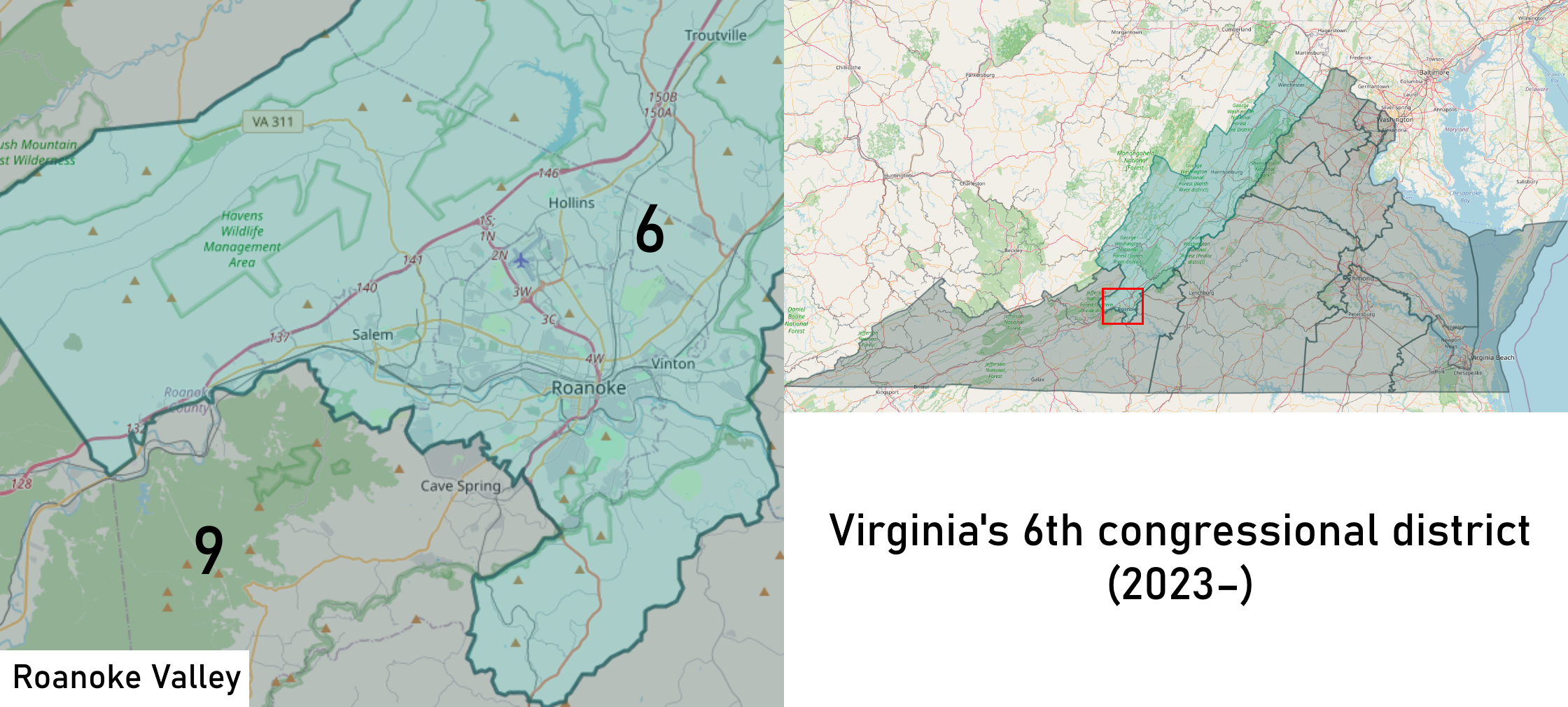
Virginia's 6th congressional district from January 3, 2023

Virginia's sixth congressional district is a United States congressional district in the Commonwealth of Virginia. It covers much of the west-central portion of the state, including Roanoke, Harrisonburg, and Winchester. The district also encompasses most of the Shenandoah Valley. It has been represented by Republican Ben Cline since 2019, following the retirement of longtime incumbent Republican Bob Goodlatte.

The district was an open seat in 2018. In November 2017, Goodlatte announced that he would retire from Congress at the end of his current term, and would not seek re-election.

Historically, the 6th district was one of the first areas of Virginia to turn Republican. Many of the old Byrd Democrats in the area began splitting their tickets and voting Republican at the national level as early as the 1930s. It was also one of the first areas of Virginia where Republicans were able to break the long Democratic dominance at the state and local level. The district elected Republicans, who held office for 30 years, from 1953 to 1983. Democrat Jim Olin won the seat in 1982, and held it for a decade before Goodlatte won it.

Some counties in the district have not supported a Democrat for president since Franklin D. Roosevelt. For instance, Highland and Shenandoah counties last voted for a Democratic presidential candidate in 1932, Page County last voted Democratic in 1936, and Augusta and Roanoke counties have not supported a Democrat since 1944. The district as a whole has not supported a Democrat for president since Lyndon B. Johnson in 1964.

== Area covered ==
For the 118th and successive Congresses (based on redistricting following the 2020 census), the district contains all or portions of the following counties and communities:

Alleghany County (7)

All 7 communities

Augusta County (20)

All 20 communities

Bath County (3)

All 3 communities

Botetourt County (10)

All 10 communities

Clarke County (3)

All 3 communities

Frederick County (6)

All 6 communities

Highland County (2)

McDowell, Monterey

Page County (3)

All 3 communities

Roanoke County (3)

Glenvar, Hollins, Vinton

Rockbridge County (4)

All 4 communities

Rockingham County (15)

All 15 communities

Shenandoah County (9)

All 9 communities

Warren County (6)

All 6 communities

Independent cities (9)

Buena Vista, Covington, Harrisonburg, Lexington, Roanoke, Salem, Staunton, Waynesboro, Winchester

== Recent election results ==
=== 2000s ===
2000 Virginia's 6th congressional district election
Party	Candidate	Votes	%
Republican	Bob Goodlatte (incumbent)	153,338	99.3
Write-ins		1,145	0.7
Total votes		154,483	100.00

2002 Virginia's 6th congressional district election
Party	Candidate	Votes	%
Republican	Bob Goodlatte (incumbent)	105,530	97.1
Write-ins		3,202	2.9
Total votes		108,732	100.00

2004 Virginia's 6th congressional district election
Party	Candidate	Votes	%
Republican	Bob Goodlatte (incumbent)	206,560	96.7
Write-ins		7,008	3.3
Total votes		213,648	100.00

2006 Virginia's 6th congressional district election
Party	Candidate	Votes	%
Republican	Bob Goodlatte (incumbent)	153,187	75.1
Independent	Barbara Jean Pryor	25,129	12.3
Independent	Andre Peery	24,731	12.1
Write-ins		948	0.5
Total votes		203,995	100.00

2008 Virginia's 6th congressional district election
Party	Candidate	Votes	%
Republican	Bob Goodlatte (incumbent)	192,350	61.6
Democratic	Sam Rasoul	114,367	36.6
Write-ins		262	0.1
Total votes		312,392	100.00

=== 2010s ===
2010 Virginia's 6th congressional district election
Party	Candidate	Votes	%
Republican	Bob Goodlatte (incumbent)	127,487	76.3
Independent	Jeffrey Vanke	21,649	13.0
Libertarian	Stuart Bain	15,309	9.2
Write-ins		2,709	1.6
Total votes		167,154	100.00

2012 Virginia's 6th congressional district election
Party	Candidate	Votes	%
Republican	Bob Goodlatte (incumbent)	211,278	65.2
Democratic	Andy Schmookler	111,949	34.6
Write-ins		666	0.2
Total votes		323,893	100.00

2014 Virginia's 6th congressional district election
Party	Candidate	Votes	%
Republican	Bob Goodlatte (incumbent)	133,898	74.3
Libertarian	Will Hammer	22,161	12.3
Green	Bo Brown	21,447	11.9
Write-ins		2,202	1.2
Total votes		179,708	100.00

2016 Virginia's 6th congressional district election
Party	Candidate	Votes	%
Republican	Bob Goodlatte (incumbent)	225,471	66.6
Democratic	Kai Degner	112,170	33.1
Write-ins		768	0.2
Total votes		338,409	100.00

2018 Virginia's 6th congressional district election
Party	Candidate	Votes	%
Republican	Ben Cline	167,957	59.7
Democratic	Jennifer Lewis	113,133	40.2
Write-ins		287	0.1
Total votes		281,377	100.00

=== 2020s ===
2020 Virginia's 6th congressional district election
Party	Candidate	Votes	%
Republican	Ben Cline (incumbent)	246,606	64.7
Democratic	Nicholas Betts	134,729	35.4
Total votes		381,335	100.00

2022 Virginia's 6th congressional district election
Party	Candidate	Votes	%
Republican	Ben Cline (incumbent)	173,352	64.4
Democratic	Jennifer Lewis	95,410	35.4
Write-in		472	0.2
Total votes		269,234	100.00

==== 2024 ====
2024 Virginia's 6th congressional district election
Party	Candidate	Votes	%
Republican	Ben Cline (incumbent)	256,933	63.1
Democratic	Ken Mitchell	141,612	34.8
Independent	Robby Wells	7,980	2.0
Write-in		510	0.1
Total votes		407,035	100.0
Republican hold			

== Recent election results from statewide races ==
Year	Office	Results
2008	President	McCain 56% - 42%
2008	Senate	Warner 59% - 40%
2009	Governor	McDonnell 66% - 34%
2009	Lt. Governor	Bolling 66% - 34%
2009	Attorney General	Cuccinelli 67% - 33%
2012	President	Romney 58% - 40%
2012	Senate	Allen 58% - 41%
2013	Governor	Cuccinelli 57% - 35%
2013	Lt. Governor	Jackson 57% - 42%
2013	Attorney General	Obenshain 64% - 36%
2014	Senate	Gillespie 60% - 37%
2016	President	Trump 60% - 34%
2017	Governor	Gillespie 60% - 38%
2017	Lt. Governor	Vogel 63% - 37%
2017	Attorney General	Donley Adams 62% - 38%
2018	Senate	Stewart 57% - 41%
2020	President	Trump 60% - 38%
2020	Senate	Gade 58% - 41%
2021	Governor	Youngkin 66% - 33%
2021	Lt. Governor	Earle-Sears 66% - 34%
2021	Attorney General	Miyares 66% - 34%
2024	President	Trump 61% - 37%
2024	Senate	Cao 59% - 41%
2025	Governor	Earle-Sears 58% - 42%
2025	Lt. Governor	Reid 60% - 40%
2025	Attorney General	Miyares 62% - 38%

== List of members representing the district ==
Representative	Party	Term	Cong ress	Electoral history
District established March 4, 1789
Isaac Coles (Coles Hill)	Anti-Administration	March 4, 1789 – March 3, 1791	1st	Elected in 1789. Retired.
Abraham B. Venable (Farmville)	Anti-Administration	March 4, 1791 – March 3, 1793	2nd	Elected in 1790. Redistricted to the 7th district.
Isaac Coles (Coles Hill)	Anti-Administration	March 4, 1793 – March 3, 1795	3rd 4th	Elected in 1793. Re-elected in 1795. Retired.
Isaac Coles (Coles Hill)	Democratic-Republican	March 4, 1795 – March 3, 1797	3rd 4th	Elected in 1793. Re-elected in 1795. Retired.
Matthew Clay (Richmond)	Democratic-Republican	March 4, 1797 – March 3, 1803	5th 6th 7th	Elected in 1797. Re-elected in 1799. Re-elected in 1801. Redistricted to the 14th district.
Abram Trigg (Christiansburg)	Democratic-Republican	March 4, 1803 – March 3, 1809	8th 9th 10th	Redistricted from the 4th district and re-elected in 1803. Re-elected in 1805. Re-elected in 1807. Retired.
Daniel Sheffey (Wythe County)	Federalist	March 4, 1809 – March 3, 1817	11th 12th 13th 14th	Elected in 1809. Re-elected in 1811. Re-elected in 1813. Re-elected in 1815. Retired.
Alexander Smyth (Wythe County)	Democratic-Republican	March 4, 1817 – March 3, 1823	15th 16th 17th	Elected in 1817. Re-elected in 1819. Re-elected in 1821. Redistricted to the 22nd district.
George Tucker (Lynchburg)	Democratic-Republican	March 4, 1823 – March 3, 1825	18th	Redistricted from the 15th district and re-elected in 1823. Lost re-election.
Thomas Davenport (Meadville)	Jackson	March 4, 1825 – March 3, 1833	19th 20th 21st 22nd 23rd	Elected in 1825. Re-elected in 1827. Re-elected in 1829. Re-elected in 1831. Re-elected in 1833. Lost re-election.
Thomas Davenport (Meadville)	Anti-Jackson	March 4, 1833 – March 3, 1835	19th 20th 21st 22nd 23rd	Elected in 1825. Re-elected in 1827. Re-elected in 1829. Re-elected in 1831. Re-elected in 1833. Lost re-election.
Walter Coles (Robertsons Store)	Jackson	March 4, 1835 – March 3, 1837	24th 25th 26th 27th	Elected in 1835. Re-elected in 1837. Re-elected in 1839. Re-elected in 1841. Redistricted to the 3rd district.
Walter Coles (Robertsons Store)	Democratic	March 4, 1837 – March 3, 1843	24th 25th 26th 27th	Elected in 1835. Re-elected in 1837. Re-elected in 1839. Re-elected in 1841. Redistricted to the 3rd district.
John W. Jones (Petersburg)	Democratic	March 4, 1843 – March 3, 1845	28th	Elected in 1843. Retired.
James A. Seddon (Richmond)	Democratic	March 4, 1845 – March 3, 1847	29th	Elected in 1845. Retired.
John M. Botts (Richmond)	Whig	March 4, 1847 – March 3, 1849	30th	Elected in 1847. Lost re-election.
James A. Seddon (Richmond)	Democratic	March 4, 1849 – March 3, 1851	31st	Elected in 1849. Retired.
John S. Caskie (Richmond)	Democratic	March 4, 1851 – March 3, 1853	32nd	Elected in 1851. Redistricted to the 3rd district.
Paulus Powell (Amherst)	Democratic	March 4, 1853 – March 3, 1859	33rd 34th 35th	Elected in 1853. Re-elected in 1855. Re-elected in 1857. Lost re-election.
Shelton F. Leake (Charlottesville)	Independent Democratic	March 4, 1859 – March 3, 1861	36th	Elected in 1859. Retired.
District inactive		March 4, 1861 – January 26, 1870	37th 38th 39th 40th 41st	Civil War and Reconstruction
William Milnes Jr. (Shenandoah Iron Works)	Conservative	January 27, 1870 – March 3, 1871	41st	Elected in 1870. Lost re-election.
John T. Harris (Harrisonburg)	Democratic	March 4, 1871 – March 3, 1873	42nd	Elected in 1870. Redistricted to the 7th district.
Thomas Whitehead (Amherst)	Democratic	March 4, 1873 – March 3, 1875	43rd	Elected in 1872. Retired.
John R. Tucker (Lexington)	Democratic	March 4, 1875 – March 3, 1885	44th 45th 46th 47th 48th	Elected in 1874. Re-elected in 1876. Re-elected in 1878. Re-elected in 1880. Re-elected in 1882. Redistricted to the 10th district.
John W. Daniel (Lynchburg)	Democratic	March 4, 1885 – March 3, 1887	49th	Elected in 1884. Elected to the U.S. Senate
Samuel I. Hopkins (Lynchburg)	Labor Party	March 4, 1887 – March 3, 1889	50th	Elected in 1886. Retired.
Paul C. Edmunds (Halifax)	Democratic	March 4, 1889 – March 3, 1895	51st 52nd 53rd	Elected in 1888. Re-elected in 1890. Re-elected in 1892. Retired.
Peter J. Otey (Lynchburg)	Democratic	March 4, 1895 – May 4, 1902	54th 55th 56th 57th	Elected in 1894. Re-elected in 1896. Re-elected in 1898. Re-elected in 1900. Died.
Vacant		May 5, 1902 – November 3, 1902	57th	
E. Carter Glass (Lynchburg)	Democratic	November 4, 1902 – December 16, 1918	57th 58th 59th 60th 61st 62nd 63rd 64th 65th	Elected to finish Otey's term. Elected the same day to the next term. Re-elected in 1904. Re-elected in 1906. Re-elected in 1908. Re-elected in 1910. Re-elected in 1912. Re-elected in 1914. Re-elected in 1916. Re-elected in 1918. Resigned to become U.S. Secretary of Treasury.
Vacant		December 17, 1918 – February 24, 1919	65th	
James P. Woods (Roanoke)	Democratic	February 25, 1919 – March 3, 1923	65th 66th 67th	Elected to finish Glass's term. Elected the same day to the next term. Lost re-election.
Clifton A. Woodrum (Roanoke)	Democratic	March 4, 1923 – March 3, 1933	68th 69th 70th 71st 72nd	Elected in 1922. Elected in 1924. Re-elected in 1926. Re-elected in 1928. Re-elected in 1930. Redistricted to the at-large seat.
District inactive		March 4, 1933 – January 3, 1935	73rd	
Clifton A. Woodrum (Roanoke)	Democratic	January 3, 1935 – December 31, 1945	74th 75th 76th 77th 78th 79th	Redistricted from the at-large seat and re-elected in 1934. Re-elected in 1936. Re-elected in 1938. Re-elected in 1940. Re-elected in 1942. Re-elected in 1944. Resigned.
Vacant		December 31, 1945 – January 22, 1946	79th	
J. Lindsay Almond (Roanoke)	Democratic	January 22, 1946 – April 17, 1948	79th 80th	Elected to finish Woodrum's term. Re-elected in 1946. Elected Attorney General of Virginia.
Vacant		April 17, 1948 – November 2, 1948	80th	
Clarence G. Burton (Lynchburg)	Democratic	November 2, 1948 – January 3, 1953	80th 81st 82nd	Elected to finish Almond's term. Re-elected in 1948. Re-elected in 1950. Lost re-election.
Richard H. Poff (Radford)	Republican	January 3, 1953 – August 29, 1972	83rd 84th 85th 86th 87th 88th 89th 90th 91st 92nd	Elected in 1952. Re-elected in 1954. Re-elected in 1956. Re-elected in 1958. Re-elected in 1960. Re-elected in 1962. Re-elected in 1964. Re-elected in 1966. Re-elected in 1968. Re-elected in 1970. Resigned when appointed Virginia Supreme Court justice.
Vacant		August 29, 1972 – November 7, 1972	92nd	
M. Caldwell Butler (Roanoke)	Republican	November 7, 1972 – January 3, 1983	92nd 93rd 94th 95th 96th 97th	Elected to finish Poff's term. Re-elected in 1972. Re-elected in 1974. Re-elected in 1976. Re-elected in 1978. Re-elected in 1980. Retired.
Jim Olin (Roanoke)	Democratic	January 3, 1983 – January 3, 1993	98th 99th 100th 101st 102nd	Elected in 1982. Re-elected in 1984. Re-elected in 1986. Re-elected in 1988. Re-elected in 1990. Retired.
Bob Goodlatte (Roanoke)	Republican	January 3, 1993 – January 3, 2019	103rd 104th 105th 106th 107th 108th 109th 110th 111th 112th 113th 114th 115th	Elected in 1992. Re-elected in 1994. Re-elected in 1996. Re-elected in 1998. Re-elected in 2000. Re-elected in 2002. Re-elected in 2004. Re-elected in 2006. Re-elected in 2008. Re-elected in 2010. Re-elected in 2012. Re-elected in 2014. Re-elected in 2016. Retired.
Ben Cline (Fincastle)	Republican	January 3, 2019 – present	116th 117th 118th 119th	Elected in 2018. Re-elected in 2020. Re-elected in 2022. Re-elected in 2024. Re-elected in 2026.

== Historical district boundaries ==
The Virginia Sixth District started in 1788 covering the counties of Campbell, Charlotte, Buckingham, Bedford, Prince Edward, Franklin, Henry, Pittsylvania and Halifax.

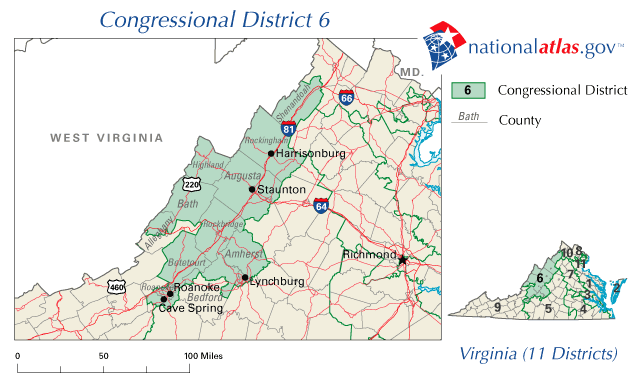
2003–2013

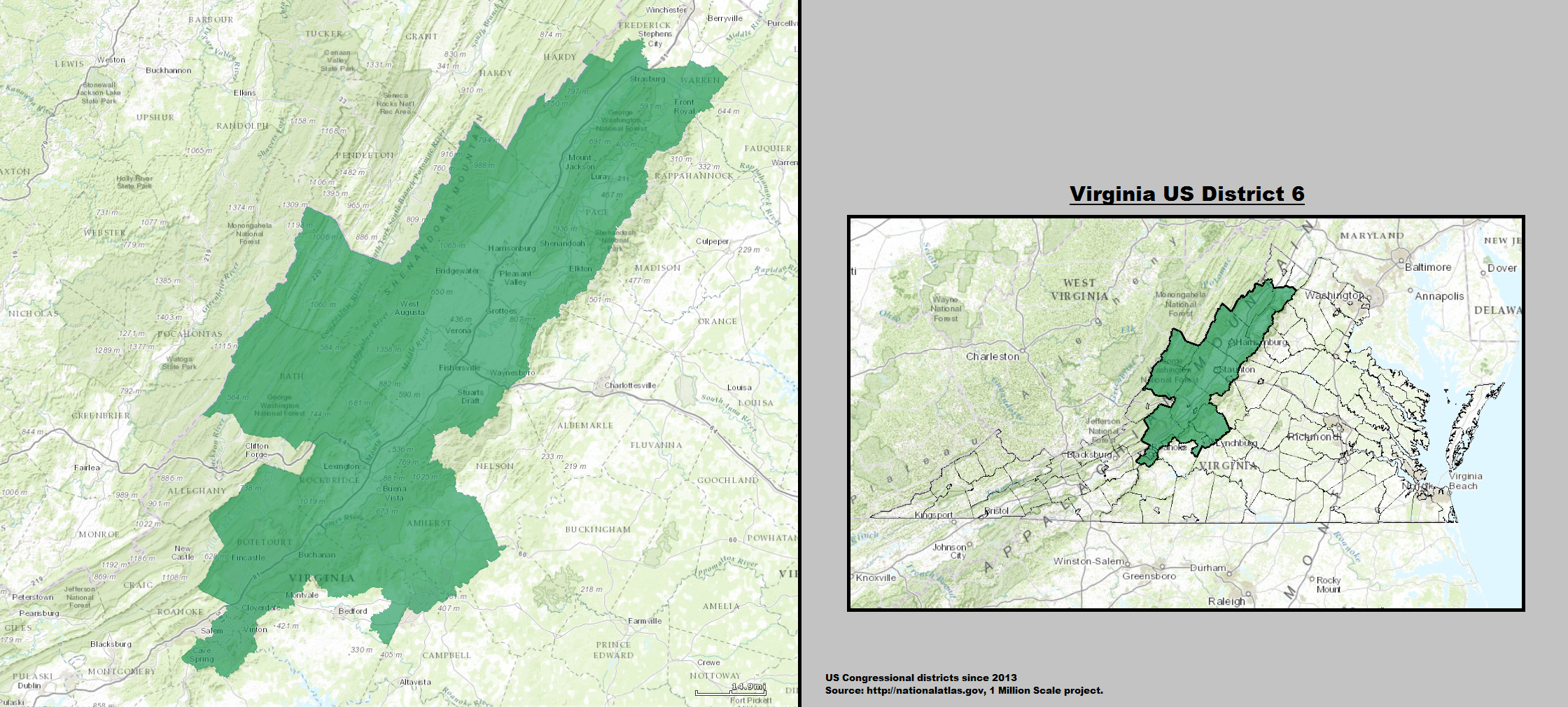
2013–2023

== See also ==
- Virginia's congressional districts
- List of United States congressional districts
