= Peter J. Otey =

American politician

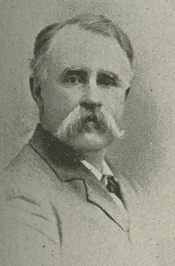

Member of the U.S. House of Representatives from Virginia's 6th district
- In office March 4, 1895 – May 4, 1902
- Preceded by: Paul C. Edmunds
- Succeeded by: Carter Glass

Personal details
- Born: December 22, 1840 Lynchburg, Virginia, US
- Died: May 4, 1902 (aged 61) Lynchburg, Virginia, US
- Party: Democratic Party
- Education: Virginia Military Institute
- Occupation: Businessman

Military service
- Allegiance: Confederate States of America
- Branch/service: Confederate States Army
- Years of service: 1861–1865
- Rank: Major
- Unit: 51st Virginia Infantry
- Commands: 30th Virginia Sharpshooters Battalion
- Battles/wars: Battle of Fort Donelson, Battle of Shiloh, Battle of Cedar Creek, Battle of New Market, Battle of Waynesboro

Peter Johnston Otey (December 22, 1840 – May 4, 1902) was former Confederate States Army officer and later prisoner of war during the American Civil War, who became businessman, land developer and railroad executive before retiring and winning election to the United States House of Representatives as a Democrat from Lynchburg, Virginia, and serving three terms before his death.

== Early and family life ==
Peter J. Otey was born on December 22, 1840, in Lynchburg, Virginia, to Lucy (née Norvell) and banker John Mathews Otey (1792–1859). He was a nephew of Episcopal Bishop James Hervey Otey, and his ancestors John Floyd (a privateer) and John Otey (commanding Kent County riflemen) fought in the American Revolutionary War. He had at least three elder brothers: Col. Kirkwood Otey (1832–1897), Capt. George Gaston Otey (1834–1862) and Capt. Water Hays Otey (1837–1890). His father owned seven enslaved females and five enslaved males (including 20 and 30 year old black men) in 1850. Otey attended private schools in Lynchburg, then like his brothers the Virginia Military Institute. Shortly before graduating, he and his fellow cadets were sent to combat John Brown's raid on Harpers Ferry. He graduated on July 1, 1860, with a degree in civil engineering.

Otey married Mary Malvina Floyd on April 14, 1863, in Wytheville, Virginia. Their son John Floyd Otey died as a teenager, although three daughters survived their parents.

== Confederate service ==
On the outbreak of the American Civil War, Otey left his job on the Virginia and Kentucky Railroad, and supposedly fired a cannon at Sewell's Point after Virginia seceded and actually hit a Union vessel, as well as fought with the U.S. Monticello on May 19, 1861. He became a lieutenant in Company S, 51st Virginia Infantry in the Army of the Kanawha under Col. Gabriel C. Wharton (VMI class of 1847, who had become a civil engineer in Arizona), former VMI mathematics professor Lt.Col. James W. Massie and former Virginia Governor General John B. Floyd (uncle of his fiancee, later wife). Otey served as a staff officer, and the 51st Virginia was tasked with protecting the Kanawha Valley and its salt and other mines, but had little success. The regiment suffered defeats at Carnifax Ferry and Cotton Hill in 1861 and in February 1862 at Fort Donelson, Tennessee, although only 2 members surrendered and the majority including this Otey escaped to defend Nashville. His three elder brothers also became Confederate officers: Kirkwood Otey commanded the 11th Virginia Infantry including at the Battle of Gettysburg (during which he sustained a shoulder wound); George Gaston Otey (who had begun the war as adjutant of the 1st Virginia Infantry) organized the "Otey Company" of light artillery in March 1862 which was sent to Western Virginia and east Tennessee and became the 13th Virginia Light Artillery by the war's end (after G.G. Otey died in October of wounds received at the Battle of Lewisburg in what became West Virginia in May); Walter Hays Otey of VMI's class of 1859 served with the 16th Virginia and 56th Virginia before resigning for health reasons and organizing a company of local defense light artillery at the Danville Arsenal.

On October 5, 1862, Peter Otey was promoted to major of the 30th Virginia Sharpshooters Battalion in General Lee's Army of Northern Virginia. He then he fought numerous battles (including the Battle of Shiloh) and defended Lynchburg as the unit was assigned to General Jubal Early's Army of the Valley. Major Otey receive an arm injury at the Battle of New Market, and was sent to Lynchburg to recover. Among those who surrendered after the Battle of Waynesboro, Major Otey was taken as a prisoner of war to Fort Delaware, where he remained until the war's end, alongside future House speaker Charles F. Crisp.

== Career ==
After the war, Otey started working as a cashier for the Lynchburg National Bank, sold insurance and was later named the general manager of the Rivermont Land Co. Otey worked with for former Confederate General William Mahone on the Atlantic, Mississippi and Ohio Railroad, but after that bankruptcy, split with that controversial figure. Starting in 1887 Otry organized and built the Lynchburg & Durham Railroad and became its president until June 21, 1891, when Otey retired shortly before his railroad merged with the Norfolk and Western Railway.

First running for public office in 1894, Otey was elected as a Democrat to the Fifty-fourth and three succeeding Congresses, serving from March 4, 1895, until his death. He was a delegate to the Democratic National Convention in 1896. On February 1, 1900, Otey introduced H.R. 277, which proposed to purchase land in Manassas, Virginia, to establish a national battle park on the grounds of the First Battle of Manassas, which was implemented (and expended) three decades later during the Great Depression.

== Death and legacy ==
Otey died in Lynchburg, Virginia, May 4, 1902, survived by his wife and daughters and was interred in the city's Presbyterian Cemetery.

== Electoral history ==
- 1894; Otey was elected to the U.S. House of Representatives with 47.14% of the vote, defeating Republican J. Hampton Hoge and Independents O.C. Rucker and Frank Smith.
- 1896; Otey was re-elected with 57% of the vote, defeating NtD (?) DuVal Radford, Republican J. Hampton Hoge, and Populist Joseph Johnston.
- 1898; Otey was re-elected 66.93% of the vote, defeating Republicans Daniel Butler and Charles A. Heermans and Independents Ira W. Kimmell and D.G. Revere.
- 1900; Otey was re-elected with 77.54% of the vote, defeating Republican J.B. Stovall, Jr. and Populist A.E. Fairweather.

== See also ==
- List of members of the United States Congress who died in office (1900–1949)

U.S. House of Representatives
Preceded by Paul C. Edmunds	Member of the U.S. House of Representatives from Virginia's 6th congressional district 1895–1902	Succeeded by Carter Glass
