= Thomas Davenport (Virginia politician) =

American politician

Member of the U.S. House of Representatives from Virginia's 6th district
- In office March 4, 1825 – March 3, 1835
- Preceded by: George Tucker
- Succeeded by: Walter Coles

Chairman of the Committee on Public Expenditures
- In office March 4, 1833 – March 3, 1835
- Preceded by: Thomas H. Hall
- Succeeded by: Sherman Page

Personal details
- Born: birth date unknown Halifax County, Virginia
- Died: November 17, 1838 Meadville, Halifax County, Virginia
- Party: Anti-Jacksonian (after 1825)
- Other political affiliations: Jacksonian (before 1825)

Military service
- Branch/service: Virginia state militia
- Rank: Captain
- Battles/wars: War of 1812

Thomas Davenport (died November 17, 1838) was a U.S. representative from Virginia.

== Biography ==
Born in Halifax County, Virginia, where his parents were living by 1783, Davenport completed preparatory studies and received a license to operate as a merchant in Meadville, Virginia. He was a captain in the county militia during the War of 1812.

Davenport was elected as a Jacksonian to the Nineteenth through the Twenty-second Congresses and elected as an Anti-Jacksonian to the Twenty-third Congress (March 4, 1825 – March 3, 1835). He chaired the Committee on Public Expenditures (Twenty-third Congress). He was an unsuccessful candidate for reelection in 1834 to the Twenty-fourth Congress. He died near Meadville, on November 17, 1838.

== Elections ==
- 1825; Davenport was elected to the U.S. House of Representatives unopposed.
- 1827; Davenport was re-elected unopposed.
- 1829; Davenport was re-elected unopposed.
- 1831; Davenport was re-elected unopposed.
- 1833; Davenport was re-elected with 51.04% of the vote, defeating Independents Benjamin W.S. Cabell and Oden G. Clay.
- 1835; Davenport lost his bid for re-election.

== Sources ==
- United States Congress. "Thomas Davenport (id: D000079)". Biographical Directory of the United States Congress.
- Obituary with death date in Lynchburg Virginian, November 19, 1838.

U.S. House of Representatives
Preceded by George Tucker	Member of the U.S. House of Representatives from Virginia's 6th congressional district 1825–1835	Succeeded by Walter Coles
