= Walter Coles =

American politician (1790–1857)

Member of the U.S. House of Representatives from Virginia
- In office March 4, 1835 – March 3, 1845
- Preceded by: Thomas Davenport (6th); John W. Jones (3rd)
- Succeeded by: John W. Jones (6th); William Tredway (3rd)
- Constituency: 6th district (1835-43); 3rd district (1843-45)

Member of the Virginia House of Delegates from Pittsylvania County
- In office 1833-1834 Serving with William Swanson
- Preceded by: Vincent Witcher
- Succeeded by: Vincent Witcher
- In office 1817-1818 Serving with Thomas H. Clarke
- Preceded by: George Tucker
- Succeeded by: George Townes

Personal details
- Born: December 8, 1790 Coles Ferry, Halifax County, Virginia, U.S.
- Died: November 9, 1857 (aged 66) Coles Hill, Pittsylvania County, Virginia, U.S.
- Party: Democratic
- Relations: Isaac Coles (father), Edward Coles (cousin)

Walter Coles (December 8, 1790 – November 9, 1857) was a Virginia planter, military officer and Democratic politician who served in the Virginia House of Delegates and in the U.S. House of Representatives.

== Early and family life ==
He was born at Coles Ferry in Halifax County, Virginia, the son of the former Catherine Thompson, the second wife of Isaac Coles. His father was a planter and legislator who served in the Virginia House of Delegates and Virginia's Ratification Convention of 1788, then in the U.S. House of Representatives. He was named for either his great-grandfather, who had become provost of Wexford County, Ireland in 1703, or for an uncle, Walter Coles (patriot), who had represented Halifax County in the House of Burgesses and Virginia Senate. His paternal grandfather, merchant John Coles, helped found Richmond, Virginia, and bought large tracts of land in southern Virginia, particularly along the upper James River as well the Roanoke River and its tributary, the Staunton River. His uncle, also John Coles, had inherited land in what was Goochland County but became Albemarle and even later Nelson Counties, and one of his sons, Edward Coles (this man's cousin), became the secretary to President James Madison and later moved to the Illinois Territory, freed his slaves, and served as Governor of Illinois before moving to Philadelphia, Pennsylvania and raising a family.

According to different accounts, his mother was the sister of a former member of the Queen's Guards or a beauty descended from the Beekman family of New York City. His parents met during Isaac Coles' congressional service in New York City. Her sister Anne Thompson (1767-1848) married the elderly bachelor Elbridge Gerry of Massachusetts, who had been one of the signers of the Declaration of Independence and held many offices including Governor of Massachusetts, Congressman and vice president of the United States. Ultimately, his father would be defeated for re-election by fellow Democratic-Republican Matthew Clay, who criticized the elder Coles for not marrying a Virginia woman. In any event, Catherine Thompson Coles had several children and survived her husband by decades. This man's elder half-brother, Isaac Coles Jr. (1777-1814) also served in the Virginia House of Delegates, and his cousin Isaac H. Coles (son of his uncle Walter Coles) in the Virginia state senate.

=== Education ===
When Walter was seven years old, his family moved to Pittsylvania County, where his father inherited land, then operated plantations using enslaved labor. Isaac Coles thought Pittsylvania County more healthful than his low-lying Halifax County plantation, which he left in the care of his eldest son Isaac Jr., who would continue the family's planter and legislative traditions, but died shortly after his father. In any event, after a private education suitable to his class, Walter Coles attended Hampden-Sydney College, where he was a member of the debating society. He also attended Washington College in Lexington (now Washington and Lee University).

=== Military service ===
During the War of 1812, Coles served as a second lieutenant in the 2nd Regiment Light Dragoons, which fought on the northern front near the Canadian border. On March 17, 1814 he was promoted to captain, and commanded the 3rd Rifle Regiment. On June 15, 1815, Coles was honorably discharged.

=== Marriage and family ===
On April 4, 1821, Coles married into the First Families of Virginia. His bride, Lettice Priscilla Carrington, was a daughter of Paul Carrington who had served in the Virginia Conventions of 1776 and 1788, before becoming a judge on the Virginia Court of Appeals (now the Virginia Supreme Court). They had two sons, of whom Isaac died as a young boy but Walter Coles (1825-1914) survived even the Civil War. Of their five daughters, only Mildred Coles Flournoy and her sister Agnes Coles Cabell married, but to families of similar social caste.

== Career ==
His father Isaac Coles died in June 1813, and his elder half-brother Isaac Coles Jr. less than a year later. Because of those deaths, Walter Coles inherited nine slaves and 1,240 acres of land in Pittsylvania County by the time he returned to Virginia after his discharge. Walter Coles established his home, which he called "Coles Hill", on that inherited land (about 6 miles east of Chatham, the county seat). About 1825, he built a handsome brick residence in the then-popular Georgian style.

Like his father and most other family members, Coles continued to farm using enslaved labor. Complicating matters before 1830 several relatives of the same name owned significant numbers of slaves in Hanover County, Virginia and Albemarle County, Virginia. In 1830, this Walter Coles owned 56 enslaved people in Pittsylvania County. In the last federal census before his death, after making provision for his children, Coles or his son of the same name owned 20 enslaved people in Pittsylvania County, whereas the other man owned 96 enslaved people in the same area.

Because of the poor condition of local roads, Coles usually traveled by carriage only to a river, then using waterborne transport to reach his destination. Thus, to travel to Richmond during his terms as a delegate described below, Coles could travel north by carriage to the James River to embark on a bateau which paddled and sailed to the state capital. In 1819 Coles helped survey the Roanoke River nearer his plantations for the Roanoke Navigation Company, which sought to improve the navigability of the river, notorious for flooding, and which drained into North Carolina. After his election to Congress, as described below, Coles would travel by carriage to the Roanoke River, where he (and sometimes his family) then embarked on a boat, possibly changing vessels in North Carolina before sailing up to Chesapeake Bay and Washington, D.C.

Walter Coles began his political career in 1817. In that year, Pittsylvania County voters elected him to represent them (part time) in the Virginia House of Delegates, though he then served only a single term. Coles would not again serve in the legislature for nearly two decades, until after the Virginia Constitutional Convention of 1830. In 1833 Coles again became one of Pittsylvania County's delegates, just before the congressional term described below.

In April 1835, Coles, a Democrat, defeated incumbent Whig Thomas Davenport for a seat in the United States House of Representatives. He would win re-election several times and represented Pittsylania and neighboring Campbell and Halifax Counties from March 4, 1835, to March 3, 1845, when he retired from legislative service. In most of those, terms, the district was called Virginia's 6th congressional district. After the reapportionment following the 1840 census, Campbell County was removed and Franklin, Henry and Patrick Counties were added to what became Virginia's 3rd congressional district. In Congress, Coles served on the Committee on Military Affairs or the Committee on the Militia, and became its ranking member by his second term. Coles also advocated for his region's main export crop, tobacco. In the 24th Congress (1835-1837), Coles became the ranking member on the select committee to examine the high tariffs imposed by foreign governments on American tobacco. In the 26th Congress, Coles again sat on a select committee relating to the tobacco trade, where he encouraged free trade and opposed excessive tariffs on that major export crop.

Although Coles spoke rather infrequently in Congress, he did introduce a resolution and made a speech urging the House to table any petition related to the abolition of slavery or to the buying, selling, trading and transportation of slaves. Former president John Quincy Adams vehemently opposed this "gag resolution." Coles decided not to run for re-election in 1844, but instead returned to Coles Hill and farming. By 1850 he owned 2,239 acres in Pittsylvania County.

== Death and legacy ==
Walter Coles died of pneumonia at Coles Hill on November 9, 1857. He was buried at the family cemetery near Chatham, Virginia.

== Elections ==
- 1835; Coles was elected to the U.S. House of Representatives with 54.11% of the vote, defeating Whig Thomas Davenport.
- 1837; Coles was re-elected with 65.04% of the vote, defeating Whig John Kerr.
- 1839; Coles was re-elected with 51.7% of the vote, defeating Whig Vincent Witcher.
- 1841; Coles was re-elected with 50.45% of the vote, defeating Whig Witcher.
- 1843; Coles was re-elected with 51.35% of the vote, defeating a Whig identified only as Gilmer.

== Sources ==
- United States Congress. "Walter Coles (id: C000625)". Biographical Directory of the United States Congress.

U.S. House of Representatives
Preceded by Thomas Davenport	Member of the U.S. House of Representatives from Virginia's 6th congressional district 1835–1843	Succeeded by John Winston Jones
Preceded by John Winston Jones	Member of the U.S. House of Representatives from Virginia's 3rd congressional district 1843–1845	Succeeded by William Tredway
