= William Tredway =

American politician (1807–1891)

William Marshall Tredway

Member of the U.S. House of Representatives from Virginia's 3rd district
- In office March 4, 1845 – March 3, 1847
- Preceded by: Walter Coles
- Succeeded by: Thomas Flournoy

Personal details
- Born: August 24, 1807 Prince Edward County, Virginia
- Died: May 1, 1891 (aged 83) Chatham, Virginia
- Resting place: Chatham Cemetery, Chatham, Virginia
- Party: Democratic
- Education: Hampden-Sydney College
- Profession: lawyer

William Marshall Tredway (August 24, 1807 – May 1, 1891) was a U.S. representative from Virginia.

== Early life ==
Born near Farmville in Prince Edward County, Virginia, Tredway completed preparatory studies. He was graduated from Hampden-Sydney College, Prince Edward County, Virginia, in 1827.

== Career ==
After college studies, Tredway studied law, was admitted to the bar in 1830 and commenced practice in Danville, Virginia.

Tredway was elected as a Democrat to the Twenty-ninth Congress (March 4, 1845 – March 3, 1847) with 57.34% of the vote, defeating Whig John D. Cheatham. He was an unsuccessful candidate for reelection in 1846 to the Thirtieth Congress.

He served as delegate to the Democratic State convention in 1850.

In 1850, Tredway was elected to the Virginia Constitutional Convention of 1850. He was one of six delegates elected from the Southside delegate district made up of his home district of Pittsylvania County, as well as Halifax, and Mecklenburg Counties.

He served as member of the secession convention of Virginia in 1861. A conditional Unionist, he voted against secession on April 4 and for secession on April 17 following Lincoln's call for state militia to restore seized Federal property.

Tredway served as judge of the circuit court of Virginia 1870–1879. He resumed the practice of law in Chatham, Virginia.

== Death ==
William Marshall Tredway died on May 1, 1891, in Chatham, Virginia. He was interred in Chatham Cemetery.

== See also ==
U.S. House of Representatives
Preceded by Walter Coles	Member of the U.S. House of Representatives from Virginia's 3rd congressional district 1845–1847	Succeeded by Thomas Flournoy

== Bibliography ==
- "How Virginia Convention delegates voted on secession, April 4 and April 17…" (PDF). Union or Secession. Library of Virginia.
- "Biographical Directory of the United States Congress, 1774 - Present". bioguide.congress.gov. United States Congress. Archived from the original on April 23, 2010.
- Pulliam, David Loyd (1901). The Constitutional Conventions of Virginia from the foundation of the Commonwealth to the present time. John T. West, Richmond. ISBN 978-1-2879-2059-5.
