= 1855 Virginia gubernatorial election =

- May 24, 1855
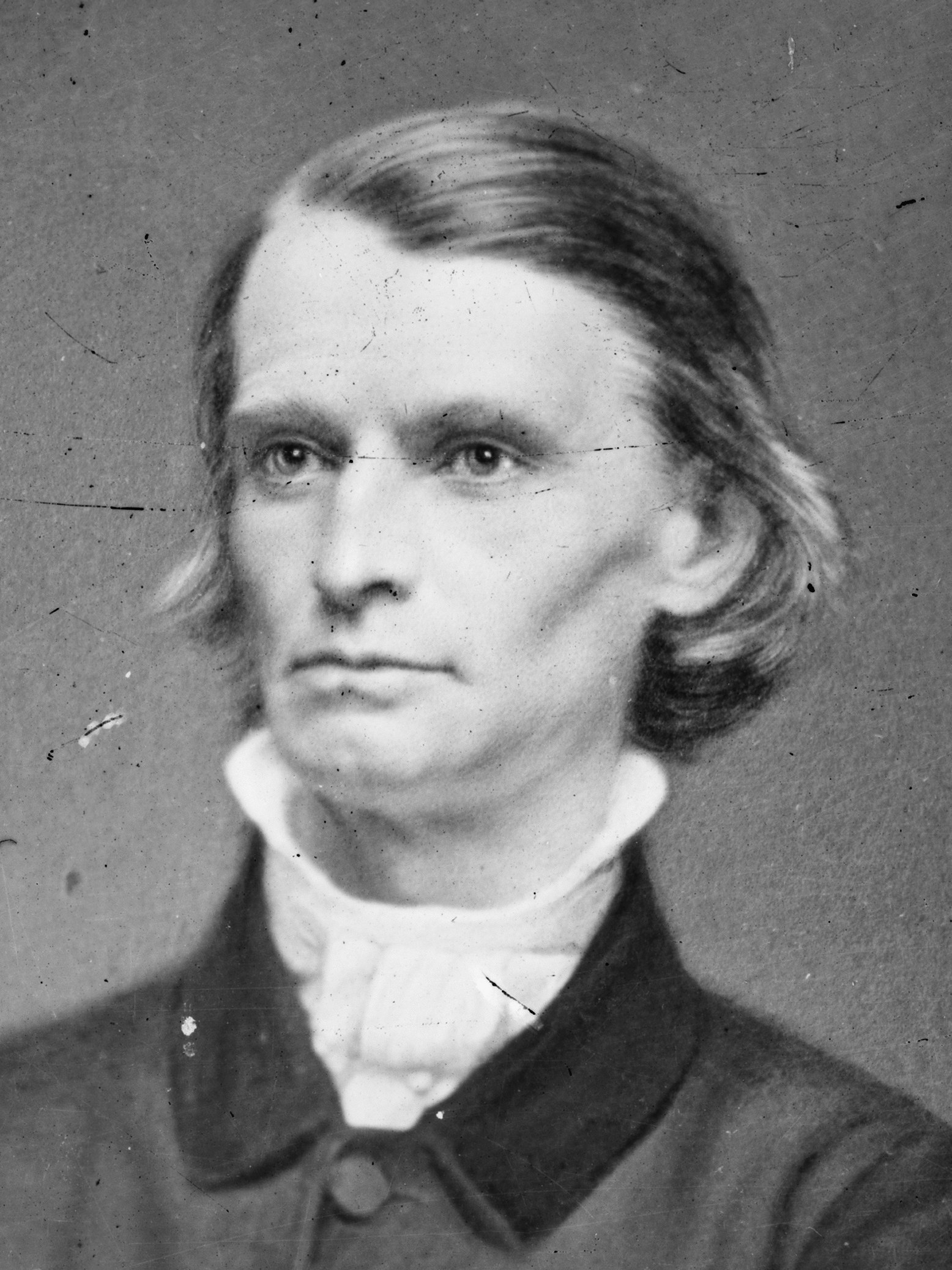

Nominee	Henry A. Wise	Thomas Flournoy
Party	Democratic	Know Nothing
Alliance	-	Republican
Popular vote	83,275	73,354
Percentage	53.17%	46.63%
- County results Wise: 50–60% 60–70% 70–80% 80–90% >90% Flournoy: 50–60% 60–70% 70–80% 80–90% No Data/Vote
Governor before election
Joseph Johnson
Democratic
Elected Governor
Henry A. Wise
Democratic

The 1855 Virginia gubernatorial election was held on May 24, 1855, to elect the governor of Virginia.

== Results ==
Virginia gubernatorial election, 1855
Party	Candidate	Votes	%
Democratic	Henry A. Wise	83,275	53.17%
Know Nothing	Thomas Flournoy	73,354	46.63%
Total votes		156,629	100.00%
Democratic hold			
