= Walter Coles (patriot) =

American politician (1739–1780)

Member of the Virginia Senate from Halifax, Charlotte and Prince Edward Counties
- In office May 3, 1779-1780
- Preceded by: John Lewis
- Succeeded by: Nathaniel Venable

Member of the House of Burgesses from Halifax County
- In office 1769-1776 Serving with Nathaniel Terry
- Preceded by: John Lewis
- Succeeded by: Micajah Watkins
- In office 1765-1768 Serving with Edward Booker
- Preceded by: Nathaniel Terry
- Succeeded by: Nathaniel Terry

Personal details
- Born: November 14, 1739 Hanover County, Colony of Virginia, British America
- Died: November 7, 1780 (aged 40) Halifax County, Colony of Virginia
- Spouse: Mildred Lightfoot
- Profession: Planter

Walter Coles (November 14, 1739 – November 7, 1780) was a merchant, planter and politician, who served in the House of Burgesses and Virginia Senate.

== Early and family life ==
Born in Hanover County in 1739 to the former Mary Winston, and her husband, John Coles (1705–1747), who had emigrated from Enniscorthy, Ireland. He was named for his paternal grandfather, who was elected Portreeve (Provost) of Wexford County, Ireland in 1703 and never emigrated (although that Irish branch of the family was wiped out or left Wexford County in the Rebellion of 1798). His father became a merchant in Henrico County and speculated in lands in the colony's central and southern limits, which his sons (including this man) would inherit. His father had helped to settle what became Richmond at the falls of the James River. He became colonel of the local militia, as well as helped found now-historic St. John's Church. John Coles also bought land in what was then Goochland County (but became Albemarle County) from the sons of Francis Epps and built a summer home there, which he called "Enniscorthy", and which his middle son (also John, 1745–1808) would ultimately inherit. Meanwhile, his younger brother, Williams Coles (d. 1781), emigrated to Virginia, married Lucy Winston Dabney (Mary's widowed sister) and settled in Hanover County, slightly to the north of his brother in Henrico County, where he called his plantation "Coles Hill" (as would this man's nephew in Pittsylvania County years later). [Complicating matters, Williams Coles named his only son "Walter" (who predeceased his father, dying in 1769).] Williams Coles ultimately became one of the executors of his emigrant brother's will and co-guardian of his young nephews, but may be better known today as the maternal grandfather of two sisters. His daughter Mary married John Payne before giving birth to Dorothy (who married future President James Madison and became known as "Dolley Madison"), and Lucy (who married Major George Steptoe Washington and after his death Thomas Todd, Chief Justice of Kentucky and later a U.S. Supreme Court judge).

Meanwhile, this man's merchant father John Coles died when Walter was 17 (not quite legal age), and months after the birth of the family's youngest son, Isaac Coles. His brother John Coles Jr. inherited Enniscorthy and about 3,854 acres of land in Albemarle County. Both this Walter Coles and his youngest brother Issac Coles (1747–1813) inherited lands in what was then vast Brunswick County (but later became Halifax County). Their sister Mary married Henry Tucker of Norfolk and had children, though their sister Sarah (who married George Muter of Norfolk who moved to Kentucky) had no children.

When he came of age, Walter Coles married Mildred Lightfoot, daughter of Charles City County burgess William Lightfoot and his wife, the former Mildred Howell. They had seven children, of whom most never married, including three of their four sons—John (1772–1782), and his brothers Walter (1775–1792) and William Coles (1777–1814). Issac Coles (1777–1814) became a planter (after buying "Berry Hill" from his cousin Isaac Coles) and Virginia state senator from Halifax County. He adopted the middle initial H to distinguish him from his cousins of the same name, although he never married nor had children, and ultimately devised his estate to his nieces and nephews. Repeating their father's tradition, this man's younger brother Isaac would marry Mildred Lightfoot's sister (his sister in law).

== Career ==
When he came of age, Walter Coles operated a store on the Staunton River in Halifax County, as well as a plantation he called "Mildendo".

In 1765, when Nathaniel Terry resigned from his part-time position as one of the burgesses representing Halifax County in Williamsburg in order to become the county sheriff, Coles replaced him, then basically continued to represent them (part-time) in the House of Burgesses almost until its suppression by Virginia's last colonial governor, Lord Dunmore. However, Halifax County voters only elected Coles to serve at the first Virginia revolutionary convention, where he served alongside veteran legislator Nathaniel Lewis and Micajah Watkins, who had replaced him at the last session, which was suppressed. In 1779, Coles won election to the Virginia Senate from Halifax and adjoining Charlotte and Prince Edward Counties, but died before his term ended.

== Death and legacy ==
Walter Coles died at Mildendo, and since none of his sons had children, his branch of the Coles family line ended with the death of his son Isaac in Halifax County in 1810. Walter Coles' widow survived him, and in 1787 owned 44 enslaved adults and 58 children, as well as 32 horses, 136 other livestock and four coach or chariot wheels.
