= Isaac Coles =

American politician (1747–1813)

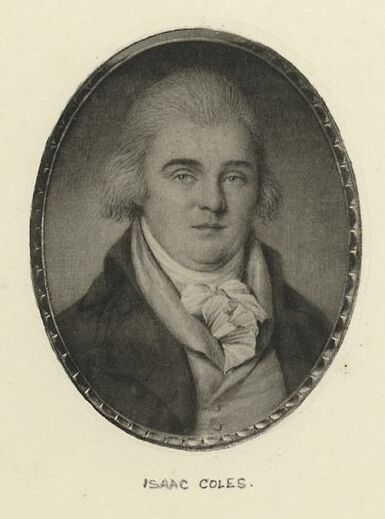

Member of the U.S. House of Representatives from Virginia's 6th district
- In office March 4, 1793 – March 3, 1797
- Preceded by: Abraham B. Venable
- Succeeded by: Matthew Clay
- In office March 4, 1789 – March 3, 1791
- Preceded by: District established
- Succeeded by: Abraham B. Venable

Member of the Virginia House of Delegates from Halifax County
- In office May 5, 1783– June 22, 1788 Serving with John Coleman, James McCraw, Jeremiah Pate and Nathaniel Hunt
- Preceded by: James McCraw
- Succeeded by: Thomas Watkins
- In office May 1, 1780-May 6, 1781 Serving with William Peters Martin
- Preceded by: Micajah Watkins
- Succeeded by: George Watkins

Personal details
- Born: March 2, 1747 Richmond, Virginia Colony, British America
- Died: June 3, 1813 (aged 66) "Coles Hill" near Chatham, Virginia, U.S.
- Resting place: "Coles Hill", Chatham Virginia
- Party: Democratic-Republican
- Other political affiliations: Anti-Administration
- Spouse(s): Elizabeth Lightfoot (d. 1781); Catherine Thompson (d. 1848)
- Children: Isaac Coles Jr., Walter Coles
- Relatives: Walter Coles (brother), Edward Coles (nephew)
- Education: College of William and Mary
- Profession: Planter

Military service
- Rank: Colonel
- Unit: Virginia state militia
- Battles/wars: American Revolutionary War

Isaac Coles (March 2, 1747 – June 3, 1813) was an American planter, militia officer and politician from Virginia.

== Early life and education ==
Coles was born in Richmond in the Colony of Virginia in 1747 to the former Mary Winston. His father, John Coles, had emigrated from Enniscorthy, Ireland, then became a merchant in first Hanover County. He moved somewhat south to Henrico County where he helped to settle Richmond at the falls of the James River, became colonel of the local militia, as well as speculated in land further south and west and helped found now-historic St. John's Church. His maternal grandfather, Isaac Winston, for whom this boy and several relatives would be named, was from Hanover County. However, John Coles died months after this son's birth. His eldest son John Coles inherited land in Albemarle County, and Issac and his middle brother Walter when they came of legal age inherited lands along the Staunton River in what was then Brunswick County but later became Halifax County. Meanwhile, Isaac was educated as befit his class, including at the College of William and Mary in Williamsburg. Their sister Mary married Henry Tucker and had children, though his sister Sarah who married General George Muter had no children.

== Personal life ==
Isaac Coles married twice. In 1771 he married Elizabeth Lightfoot, the daughter of one-term burgess William Lightfoot of Charles City County. Before her death a decade later, she bore three children, but only one survived to adulthood --Isaac Coles Jr.(1777-1814) -- who (briefly) inherited his father's lands in Halifax County and also served in the Virginia House of Delegates. In January 1790, during his Congressional service in New York City, the widowed Isaac Coles met Catherine Thompson, who according to different accounts was the sister of a former member of the Queen's Guards or a beauty descended from the Beekman family of New York City. Her sister Anne Thompson (1767-1848) married the elderly bachelor Elbridge Gerry of Massachusetts, who had been one of the signers of the Declaration of Independence and held many offices including Governor of Massachusetts, Congressman and vice president of the United States. In any event, Catherine Thompson Coles had several children and survived her husband by decades.Their eldest son Walter Coles became a congressman, as well as planter.

== Military service ==
During the American Revolutionary War, Coles joined the Virginia militia and served as a colonel in Halifax County.

== Career ==
When he reached legal age (21) and came into his inheritance, Coles became a planter in Halifax County. He built a mansion he called "Springwood" near Houston and Coles Ferry across the Staunton River. In 1785, Coles bought over 5,000 acres of land in Pittsylvania County, near Chatham, from Philip Lightfoot, a relative of his first wife. Over the next decade Coles developed this plantation, which he called "Coles Hill". In 1787, Coles owned 3,896 acres of land, as well as 32 enslaved adults, 34 children, 24 horses and 97 other livestock, as well as 4 phaeton wheels in Halifax County.

In 1780, his brother Walter Coles (patriot) died, leaving his Halifax County plantations to his widow and children, and this Isaac Coles began his political career. After Halifax County voters elected Coles as one of their (part-time) representatives in the Virginia House of Delegates, he won re-election in 1781, then after a two-session break, continually won re-election between 1783 and 1787. Halifax County voters also elected Isaac Coles as one of their representatives to the Virginia Ratifying Convention, which assembled in June 1788. There, Coles opposed ratification of the United States Constitution, although his proved the minority view.

Nevertheless, Coles successfully ran for the United States House of Representatives. During his first term, from 1789 to 1791, he opposed adoption of the new Constitution, then also voted to abolish the slave trade. This did not prove a significant liability, for Coles won re-election to the House in 1792 and 1794, thus serving from March 4, 1793, to March 3, 1797. However, his marriage in New York City proved a political liability, as perhaps did his shift toward the Federalist party of his brother-in-law, for he lost to Matthew Clay, who had repeatedly reminded voters that the widower failed to remarry a Virginia woman.

In any event, concerned about malaria and other unhealthy conditions at his Halifax County plantation, and his eldest son having become an adult carrying on the family's planter and political traditions, Coles moved his second family to his Pittsylvania County estate and sold the rest of his Halifax County property to resolve some financial difficulties. He continued to farm using enslaved labor.

== Death and legacy ==
Coles died on his plantation, Coles Hill, in Pittsylvania County near Chatham, Virginia in 1813 and was buried in the family cemetery there. His son Isaac Coles Junior only survived him by a year. His son Walter Coles would also carry on the family's political and planter traditions, and served in the House of Representatives as had his father.

A nephew, Isaac A. Coles (b. 1780 at Enniscorthy, Albemarle County and brother of future Illinois governor Edward Coles) served as personal secretary to Presidents Thomas Jefferson and James Madison during their administrations. Another nephew Isaac H. Coles served in the Virginia senate, representing Charlotte, Halifax and Prince Edward Counties.

== Elections ==
- 1789; Coles was elected to the U.S. House of Representatives unopposed.
- 1793; Coles was re-elected unopposed.
- 1795; Coles was re-elected with 36.76% of the vote, defeating Independents Simon C. McMahon and Matthew Clay.

U.S. House of Representatives
Preceded by Abraham B. Venable	Member of the U.S. House of Representatives from Virginia's 6th congressional district 1793–1797	Succeeded by Matthew Clay
Preceded by District established	Member of the U.S. House of Representatives from Virginia's 6th congressional district 1789–1791	Succeeded by Abraham Venable
