= Gideon D. Camden =

American judge

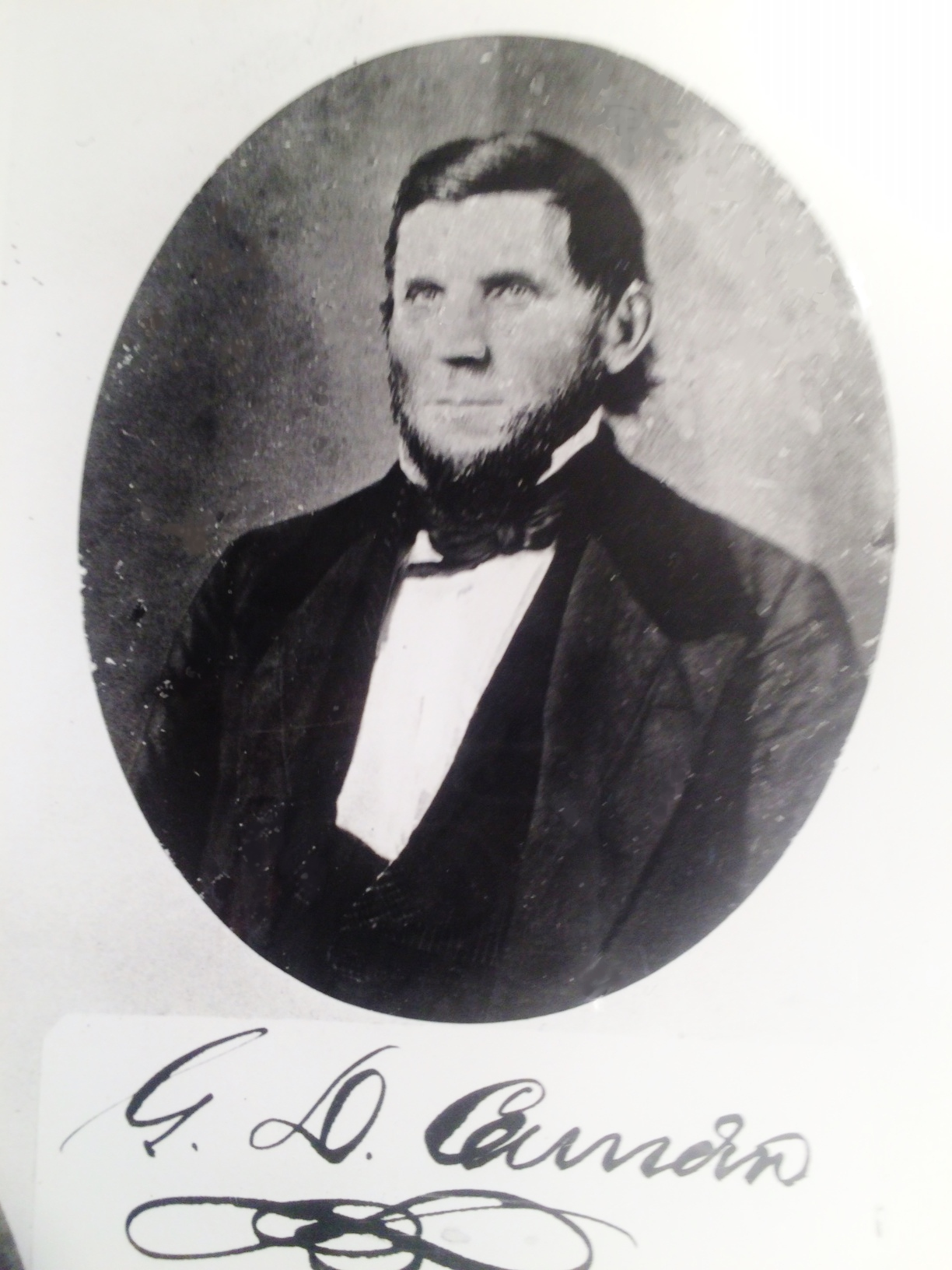

Member of the Virginia House of Delegates from Lewis County
- In office December 1, 1828 – December 6, 1829 Serving with Thomas Bland
- Preceded by: John McWhorter
- Succeeded by: Samuel L. Hays

Circuit Judge
- In office 1852–1861
- Succeeded by: William A. Harrison

Member of the West Virginia Senate from Harrison County

Personal details
- Born: August 31, 1805 Lewis County, Virginia, U.S.
- Died: April 22, 1891 (aged 85) Hot Springs, Arkansas U.S.
- Resting place: Odd Fellows Cemetery, Clarksburg, Harrison County, West Virginia, West Virginia, U.S.
- Party: Democratic
- Profession: Politician, lawyer, judge

Gideon Draper Camden (August 31, 1805 – April 22, 1891) was an American lawyer, judge and politician who opposed the creation of the state of West Virginia and sympathized with the Confederacy, but later served in the West Virginia Senate representing Harrison County.

== Early and family life ==
The sixth of ten children born to the former Mary Belt Sprigg and her husband Rev. Henry Camden (1773), a Methodist minister, Gideon Camden received his initial education at home, although he later advocated public education and sat on various educational boards. Around 1801, Rev. Camden freed his slaves in Montgomery County, Maryland and moved his family across the Appalachian Mountains of Virginia to the Collins Settlement District (about 15 miles above what became Weston and the county seat of Lewis County). Rev. Camden was a member of the first court of Braxton County, then received his preaching license in Harrison County and rode a circuit that included Carper Church in Buckhannon, West Virginia.

Young Gideon helped on his father's farm until he was 22, then moved to the county seat and became an assistant clerk of the Lewis County court, despite having received only home schooling. In 1827 he left Weston on a horse to travel to Wythe County, where he read law at the private law school established by General Alexander Smyth, who had fought in the War of 1812, served in both houses of the Virginia General Assembly, and for whom Smyth County, Virginia would be named.

He married twice. His first wife was Sarah ("Sallie"), a year younger than her husband and the mother of Gideon D. Camden Jr., John A. Camden, and daughters Eliza Camden Boggess (who lived with her lawyer husband and children in the same house as her parents, paternal grandmother and siblings in 1850), Martha and Dora. After Sarah's death, Camden remarried to widow Myra Hornor Davis, who would survive him and later remarried another lawyer, George W. Atkinson, just after he became Governor of West Virginia (and who later became a federal judge).

== Career ==
Admitted to the Virginia bar, by 1830 Camden partnered with John J. Allen, a lawyer who became a U.S. congressman and later a Virginia judge (of the 17th Circuit; and for 25 years of Virginia's Court of Appeals including through the American Civil War). Camden invested heavily in real estate, as well as worked to develop roads, railroads and energy resources in western Virginia, including as President of the Northwestern Turnpike.

Meanwhile, in 1828 Camden won his first political office, elected as a Whig as one of Lewis County's delegates in the Virginia House of Delegates and serving alongside Thomas Bland. His brother John S. Camden would also later win election for a term in the House of Delegates for a term (1845-1846). Meanwhile, Gideon Camden developed a legal practice extending (as did his personal investments) between several mountain counties. He became Commonwealth Attorney for Randolph County in 1837. Gideon Camden later won election as a delegate to the Virginia Constitutional Convention of 1850, representing Doddridge, Wetzel, Harrison, Tyler, Wood and Ritchie counties alongside fellow lawyers and investors Joseph Johnson, John F. Snodgrass and Peter G. Van Winkle. From 1843 to 1852, Jonathan M. Bennett became Gideon Camden's law partner as well as a part-time legislator.

Legislators elected Gideon Camden as judge of Virginia's 21st circuit in May 1852, and re-elected him to another 8-year term in 1860. During the 1850s, a grand jury under the guidance of Judge Hall and prosecutor Benjamin Wilson indicted Horace Greeley of New York for violating Virginia's prohibition against distribution of incendiary newspapers, in addition to his two subscribers in the county, William P. Hall and Ira Hart, but the case never came to trial. In the 1850 federal census, Camden owned 7 enslaved people in Harrison county: black men aged 35 and 20, black boys aged 12 and 8 years old, and a 35 year old black woman and girls aged 14 and 3 years old. All told, Harrison County that year had 346 "bondsmen": 161 male and 185 females. In the 1860 federal census, Camden owned two black men, aged 45 and 26 in Harrison County. (in the 1870 federal census, Camden's household included (in addition to his family) a 55 year old black woman and two children, an 11-year-old boy and 5-year-old girl.

== American Civil War ==
Though he voted against secession twice, Judge Camden ultimately signed the secession resolution and resigned his judicial position in May 1861 as Virginia joined the Confederacy and western Virginians considered secession from the state in order to remain in the union, as discussed at the Wheeling Conventions. Virginia legislators elected Camden as one of their 17 representatives to the Provisional Confederate Congress, but Camden became the only elected Virginian not to serve in that body, formally resigning in June 1861. However, he did leave his Clarksburg home (which Union forces occupied) and moved south into Virginia. His son Gideon Camden Jr. volunteered for the Confederate States Army, initially as a private of the 31st Virginia Infantry and rose to the rank of major of the 25th Virginia Infantry, as well as survived the war. Edwin D Camden also was an officer in that unit. Meanwhile, voters in what became West Virginia elected William A. Harrison to succeed Gideon Camden as the circuit judge for Harrison and surrounding counties, and Camden's son-in-law, Caleb Boggess (1822–1889), who had been another delegate to the Secession Convention but left before its adjournment, and later (after the death of Judge George Hay Lee) became the chief counsel in West Virginia for the Baltimore and Ohio Railroad.

== Postwar ==
Following the end of the disfranchisement of former Confederates in West Virginia in 1870, Camden successfully ran to represent Harrison County in the state Senate. He corresponded with delegates to the Confederate-dominated constitutional convention in 1872, but was not himself a delegate. In 1875, state legislators considered Camden for a U.S. Senate seat. By the time of his death, he was one of the wealthiest men in the state, having 60,000 acres of real estate, including lands with coal, oil and timber resources.

== Death and legacy ==
Gideon Camden survived his son, CSA Major Gideon D. Camden, Jr. by a decade, and died at Hot Springs, Arkansas in 1891.

His grandson, Wilson Lee Camden (1870-1958), became a lawyer, handled Judge Camden's estate, and later donated his family's papers to the library of West Virginia University, which makes them publicly available.
