= Green Berry Samuels =

American judge

Green B. Samuels
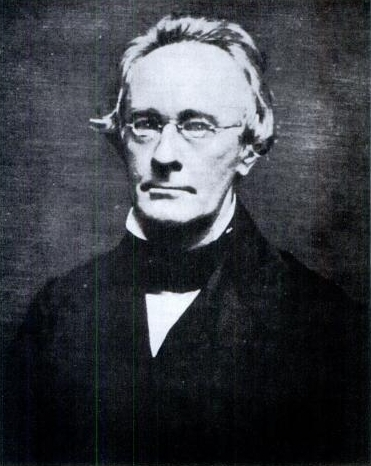

Judge on the Virginia Supreme Court of Appeals
- In office 1852 – January 5, 1859

Circuit Judge for Virginia's 14th Circuit Court
- In office December 11, 1850-1852

Delegate to the Virginia Constitutional Convention of 1850-1851
- In office October 14, 1850 – December 10, 1850

Member of the U.S. House of Representatives from Virginia's 16th district
- In office March 4, 1839 – March 3, 1841
- Preceded by: Isaac S. Pennybacker
- Succeeded by: William A. Harris

Personal details
- Born: February 1, 1806 Shenandoah County, Virginia, U.S.
- Died: January 5, 1859 (aged 52) Richmond, Virginia, U.S.
- Resting place: Woodstock, Virginia
- Spouse: Maria Gore Coffman
- Children: 5
- Profession: Law

Green Berry Samuels (February 1, 1806 – January 5, 1859) was a Virginia lawyer, politician and judge.

== Early life ==
Born in Shenandoah County, Virginia on February 6, 1806, Green Berry Samuels was a son of Isaac Samuels (1762–1819) and Elizabeth Pennybacker (1766–1824). He received a private classical education, then he studied law at Winchester Law School under Judge Henry St. George Tucker Sr.

On April 12, 1831, Samuels married Maria Gore Coffman and they had 5 children who reached adulthood: Elizabeth Margaret Samuels, Isaac Pennybacker Samuels, Anna Maria Samuels, Green Berry Samuels, Jr., and Samuel Coffman Samuels.

== Career ==
Samuels was admitted to the bar in 1827 and began his legal practice at Woodstock, Virginia, the Shenandoah county seat. Voters of Virginia's 16th congressional district elected him as a Democrat to the Twenty-sixth Congress (March 4, 1839 – March 3, 1841), where he succeeded his cousin Isaac Samuels Pennybacker, a congressman and later senator from Virginia. However, Samuels chose not to see re-election, so William A. Harris succeeded him until population losses in the next census caused Virginia to lose that congressional seat.

Voters from Shenandoah, Hardy and Warren Counties elected Samuels as one of their four delegates to the Virginia Constitutional Convention of 1850, alongside William Seymour, Giles Cook and Samuel C. Williams, but Samuels resigned on December 10, 1850, after legislators elected him a judge of the circuit court. Mark Bird then succeeded him at the convention. Two years later, in 1852, legislators elected Samuels to the Court of Appeals.

== Death ==
Green Berry Samuels died suddenly in Richmond, Virginia on January 5, 1859, at the age of 52. His remains were returned to Woodstock for burial in the Old Lutheran Graveyard (Emanuel Lutheran Church Cemetery).

== Bibliography ==
- "Biographical Directory of the United States Congress, 1774 - Present". bioguide.congress.gov. United States Congress. Archived from the original on April 23, 2010.
- Pulliam, David Loyd (1901). The Constitutional Conventions of Virginia from the foundation of the Commonwealth to the present time. John T. West, Richmond. ISBN 978-1-2879-2059-5.

U.S. House of Representatives
Preceded by Isaac S. Pennybacker	Member of the U.S. House of Representatives from Virginia's 16th congressional district 1839-1841	Succeeded by William A. Harris
