= Virginia's 18th congressional district =

1793–1843 US congressional district

Coordinates: 37°0′N 81°30′W

- Obsolete district
- Created: 1793
- Eliminated: 1843
- Years active: 1793–1843

Virginia's 18th congressional district is an obsolete congressional district. It was eliminated in 1843 after the 1840 U.S. census. Its last congressman was George W. Hopkins.

== List of members representing the district ==
Representative	Party	Term	Cong ress	Electoral history
District established March 4, 1793
John Nicholas (Williamsburg)	Anti-Administration	March 4, 1793 – March 3, 1795	3rd 4th 5th 6th	Elected in 1793. Re-elected in 1795. Re-elected in 1797. Re-elected in 1799. Retired.
John Nicholas (Williamsburg)	Democratic-Republican	March 4, 1795 – March 3, 1801	3rd 4th 5th 6th	Elected in 1793. Re-elected in 1795. Re-elected in 1797. Re-elected in 1799. Retired.
Philip R. Thompson (Fairfax)	Democratic-Republican	March 4, 1801 – March 3, 1803	7th	Elected in 1801. Redistricted to the 9th district.
Peterson Goodwyn (Petersburg)	Democratic-Republican	March 4, 1803 – March 3, 1813	8th 9th 10th 11th 12th	Elected in 1803. Re-elected in 1805. Re-elected in 1807. Re-elected in 1809. Re-elected in 1811. Redistricted to the 19th district.
Thomas Gholson, Jr. (Brunswick)	Democratic-Republican	March 4, 1813 – July 4, 1816	13th 14th	Redistricted from the 17th district and re-elected in 1813. Re-elected in 1815. Died.
Vacant		July 5, 1816 – December 3, 1816	14th	
Thomas M. Nelson (Mecklenburg County)	Democratic-Republican	December 4, 1816 – March 3, 1819	14th 15th	Elected to finish Gholson's term. Re-elected in 1817. Retired.
Mark Alexander (Lombardy Grove)	Democratic-Republican	March 4, 1819 – March 3, 1823	16th 17th	Elected in 1819. Re-elected in 1821. Redistricted to the 4th district.
Joseph Johnson (Bridgeport)	Democratic-Republican	March 4, 1823 – March 3, 1825	18th 19th	Elected in 1823. Re-elected in 1825. Lost re-election.
Joseph Johnson (Bridgeport)	Jacksonian	March 4, 1825 – March 3, 1827	18th 19th	Elected in 1823. Re-elected in 1825. Lost re-election.
Isaac Leffler (Wheeling)	Anti-Jacksonian	March 4, 1827 – March 3, 1829	20th	Elected in 1827. Lost re-election.
Philip Doddridge (Wellsburg)	Anti-Jacksonian	March 4, 1829 – November 19, 1832	21st 22nd	Elected in 1829. Re-elected in 1831. Died.
Vacant		November 20, 1832 – January 20, 1833	22nd	
Joseph Johnson (Bridgeport)	Jacksonian	January 21, 1833 – March 3, 1833	22nd	Elected January 1, 1833 to finish Doddridge's term and seated January 21, 1833. Retired.
John H. Fulton (Abingdon)	Jacksonian	March 4, 1833 – March 3, 1835	23rd	Elected in 1833. Lost re-election.
George W. Hopkins (Lebanon)	Jacksonian	March 4, 1835 – March 3, 1837	24th 25th 26th 27th	Elected in 1835. Re-elected in 1837. Re-elected in 1839. Re-elected in 1841. Redistricted to the 13th district.
George W. Hopkins (Lebanon)	Democratic	March 4, 1837 – March 3, 1839	24th 25th 26th 27th	Elected in 1835. Re-elected in 1837. Re-elected in 1839. Re-elected in 1841. Redistricted to the 13th district.
George W. Hopkins (Lebanon)	Conservative	March 4, 1839 – March 3, 1841	24th 25th 26th 27th	Elected in 1835. Re-elected in 1837. Re-elected in 1839. Re-elected in 1841. Redistricted to the 13th district.
George W. Hopkins (Lebanon)	Democratic	March 4, 1841 – March 3, 1843	24th 25th 26th 27th	Elected in 1835. Re-elected in 1837. Re-elected in 1839. Re-elected in 1841. Redistricted to the 13th district.
District dissolved March 4, 1843
