= William A. Harrison =

American judge (1795–1870)

William Alexander Harrison
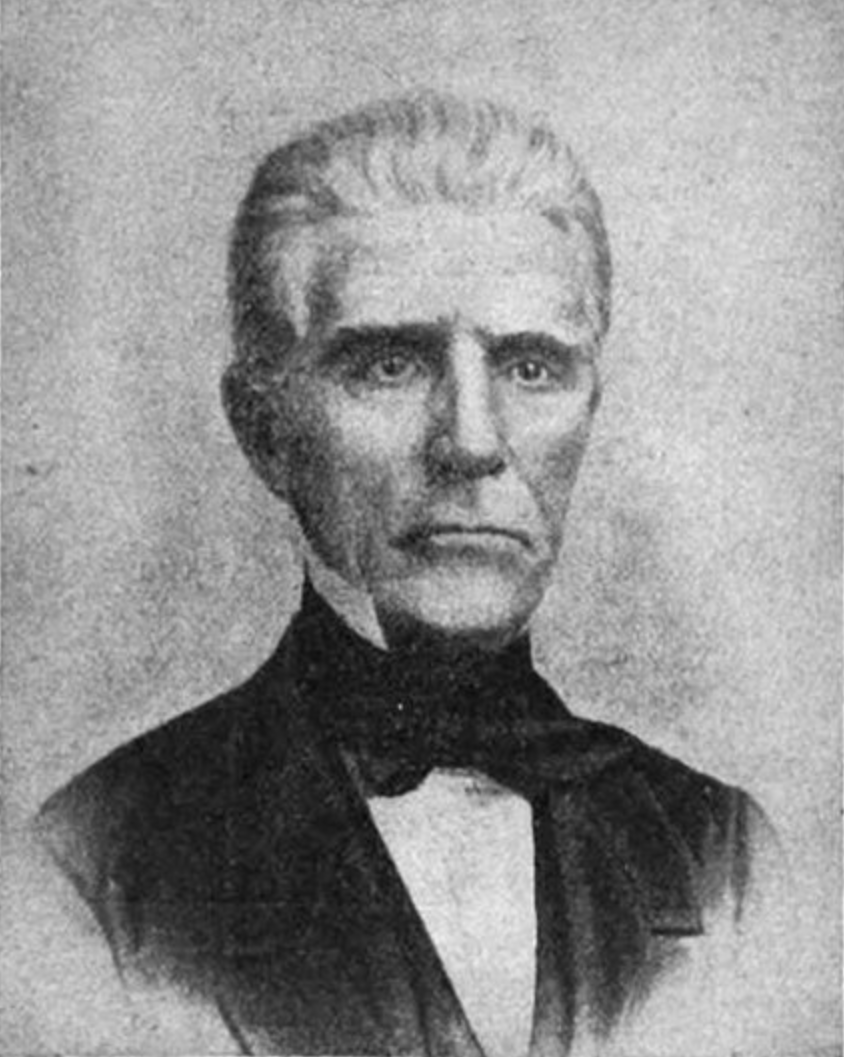

Member of the Virginia House of Delegates from Harrison County
- In office December 7, 1835 – January 6, 1839 Serving with Daniel Kincheloe, Wilson K. Shinn, Jessee Flowers
- Preceded by: Wilson K. Shinn
- Succeeded by: Edward J. Armstrong

Circuit Judge of Virginia's 21st circuit
- In office Fall 1861 – June 20, 1863
- Preceded by: Gideon D. Camden
- Succeeded by: position abolished

Judge West Virginia Court of Appeals
- In office June 20, 1863 – September 1, 1868
- Preceded by: n/a
- Succeeded by: Ralph Lazier Berkshire

Personal details
- Born: August 17, 1795 Dumfries, Virginia, US
- Died: December 31, 1870 (aged 75) Clarksburg, West Virginia, US
- Resting place: Odd Fellows Cemetery, Clarksburg, West Virginia
- Party: Republican
- Profession: Politician, lawyer, judge

William Alexander Harrison (August 17, 1795 – December 31, 1870) was a Virginia lawyer, judge and politician who helped found the state of West Virginia. He represented Harrison County, Virginia in the Virginia House of Delegates for three successive terms before the American Civil War and strongly opposed Virginia's secession. He helped form the new state of West Virginia and served as a circuit court judge during the American Civil War before winning election as one of the first judges of the Supreme Court of Appeals of West Virginia.

== Early life ==
Harrison was born in Prince William County, Virginia, to Matthew Harrison, a merchant and inspector of tobacco, and his second wife, the former Eleanor Tyler Winn. He was descended from the First Families of Virginia. His grandfather, Capt. Burr Harrison, had been a patriot during the American Revolutionary War, and represented Prince William County, Virginia in the Virginia General Assembly in 1778 and 1779. Although his father died when William was very young, the family included elder sisters Eleanor Harrison Hale (1788–1849) and Ann Tyler Harrison Safford (1787–1876), as well as elder brothers Gustavus Adolphus Harrison (1792–1848) and Frederick Tyler Harrison (1793–1878). An elder half-brother, Joseph Harrison (1771–1869) moved across the Appalachian Mountains to Hardy in Mineral County well before the Civil War. Despite his father's death, William received a private education suitable to his class, then traveled westward to Winchester in Frederick County, Virginia, where he read law with his brother-in-law Obed Waite.

== Career ==
After admission to the Virginia bar, Harrison crossed the Appalachian Mountains and began his legal practice in Parkersburg in 1819, where Judge Daniel Smith found him qualified. He may also have practiced in Marietta, Ohio across the Ohio River. In 1821, Harrison moved to Clarksburg, the center of that Virginia judicial circuit. In 1823, Harrison became an assistant U.S. Attorney for the Western District of Virginia and traveled on horseback back across the Appalachians to Wythe County, Virginia each year, until a court of appeals was founded in Lewisburg in Greenbrier County.

After his federal post ended, Harrison had a private legal practice, as well as represented (part time) Harrison County for three terms in the Virginia House of Delegates at various times alongside legislative veterans Daniel Kincheloe, Wilson K. Shinn and Jessee Flowers. Harrison's legislative service ended when he became the Harrison County Commonwealth attorney. In 1841, Harrison attended a convention at his Clarksburg Presbyterian church presided over by his fellow lawyer George Hay Lee (to which sixteen Virginia counties sent representatives), which sought to convince the Virginia General Assembly to fund free public schools (like in Ohio), although such would become a reality only after the Civil War.

Harrison opposed secession and attended a peace conference in Washington D.C. in February 1861, which convinced him that many secessionists were motivated by a lust for power and self-aggrandizement. When Virginia seceded, Gideon D. Camden, the local judge since 1855 (who had previously represented Lewis County in the House of Delegates in 1825, then Harrison and five adjacent counties in the 1850 Constitutional Convention) sided with the secessionists and would be elected to the First Confederate Congress (though he did not serve), and his son Gideon D. Camden Jr. may have organized a Confederate infantry unit.

In the fall of 1861, Harrison succeeded Camden by winning election as judge for the 21st circuit. The Wheeling Convention later appointed Harrison a member of the Governor's Council, where he helped establish the new state's justice system. His son Thomas Willoughby Harrison would become of member of the new state's first constitutional convention. As West Virginia became a state in its own right, the Union Convention nominated Harrison as one of the first three judges of the new Supreme Court of Appeals. On June 20, 1863, as the eldest member of the new court, Judge Harrison led his fellow appeals judges draw lots as to term length. Berkshire drew the shortest term of office, four years, but was also chosen to lead the body. Edwin Maxwell, a fellow Republican from Harrison County defeated Berkshire in 1866. In July 1868, Harrison announced his retirement from the bench, intending for this to take effect on January 1, 1869, though he ultimately left the court on September 1, 1868, due to poor health. Berkshire was appointed to serve the rest of his term, thus maintaining the court's geographic diversity.

== Personal life ==
On November 19, 1823, Harrison married Anna Mayburry, whose family had long operated iron furnaces in Pennsylvania and Maryland before moving to Clarksburg, where her father ran a hotel on what became the site of the Harrison County courthouse and would later operate a furnace in Rockingham County, Virginia before his death. They would have 11 children: Thomas Willoughby Harrison (1824–1910), Matthew Waite Harrison (1826–1916), Frederick Jones Harrison (1828–1829), Charles Tyler Harrison (1830–1914), William Gustavus Harrison (1832–1902), Mayburry M. Harrison (1834–1893), Susan Ellen Harrison (1836–1887), Elizabeth Jones Harrison (1838–1917), Llewellyn Cuthbert Harrison (1840–1861), Sarah Jane "Sallie" Harrison (1842-?) and Anna Rebecca Harrison (1844–1924). William Harrison's never-married elder brother Frederick T. Harrison (1793–1878) lived with the family for 63 years, including after the death of their mother in Clarksburg.

== Death and legacy ==
William A. Harrison died at his home in Clarksburg on New Year's Eve, 1870, at the age of 75. His son Thomas Willoughby Harrison (1824–1910) had become Harrison County's first West Virginia circuit judge, and served until after adoption of the state's new constitution in 1872, after which Democrats replaced Republicans like the Harrisons, although his grandson S.W. Harrison would later become Clerk of the U.S. Circuit Court.
