= Samuel Lewis Hays =

American politician

Samuel L. Hays
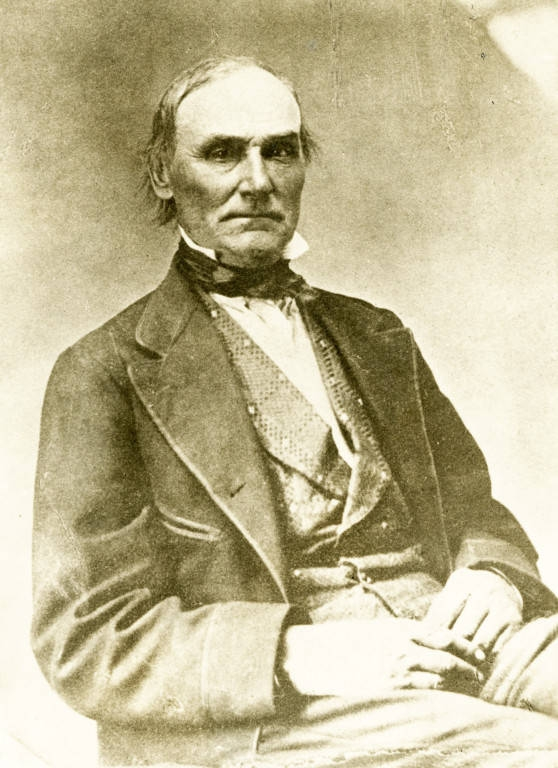

Member of the Virginia House of Delegates representing Braxton, Lewis and Gilmer Counties
- In office December 2, 1850 – January 11, 1852
- Preceded by: James Bennett
- Succeeded by: Jonathan M. Bennett

Member of the Virginia House of Delegates representing Braxton and Lewis Counties
- In office December 2, 1844 – November 30, 1845
- Preceded by: Mathew Edmiston
- Succeeded by: John S. Camden

Member of the U.S. House of Representatives from Virginia's 20th district
- In office March 4, 1841 – March 3, 1843
- Preceded by: Joseph Johnson
- Succeeded by: district eliminated

Member of the Virginia House of Delegates representing Lewis County
- In office December 7, 1835 – December 4, 1836
- Preceded by: Weeden Hoffman
- Succeeded by: Thomas Bland

Member of the Virginia House of Delegates representing Lewis County
- In office December 7, 1829 – November 30, 1834 Serving with Thomas Bland
- Preceded by: Gideon D. Camden
- Succeeded by: James M. Bennett; Weeden Hoffman

Personal details
- Born: October 20, 1794 Harrison County, Virginia
- Died: March 17, 1871 (aged 76) Sauk Rapids, Benton County, Minnesota
- Party: Jacksonian democrat, Democrat
- Occupation: Military officer, farmer, politician

Samuel Lewis Hays (October 20, 1794 – March 17, 1871) was a nineteenth-century farmer and Democratic politician in the part of Virginia that became West Virginia after he left for Minnesota. Hays served multiple terms in the Virginia House of Delegates and one term as in the U.S. House of Representatives in a district that was eliminated as Virginia lost residents.

== Early and family life ==
Hays was born in Harrison County near Clarksburg in what later became the state of West Virginia. He married Roanna Arnold in 1817. Following Roanna's death in 1841, Hays married twice more: first to Nancy Covert (died 1863) and then to Emma Fletcher.

== Career ==
Hays moved to what was then Lewis County (later Gilmer County) to farm in 1833.

Lewis County voters (and at times those in adjoining Braxton County and later Gilmer County) elected Hays many times to represent them (part-time) in the Virginia House of Delegates. Hays was elected as a Democrat to the 27th United States Congress, serving from 1841 to 1843, and made an unsuccessful bid for reelection in an adjoining district in 1842 when Virginia lost a congressman in as a result of losing population in the 1840 census. However, Hays again won election to the Virginia House of Delegates, this time representing Braxton and Lewis Counties. During his Congressional term, Hays sponsored the admission of Thomas "Stonewall" Jackson as a cadet to the military academy at West Point, and also urged the building of the Parkersburg-Staunton Turnpike. He laid out the town of Glenville in 1845.

Hays, Joseph Smith, John S. Carlile and Thomas Bland also represented Randolph, Lewis, Barbour, Gilmer, Braxton, Wirt and Jackson counties as their delegates to the Virginia Constitutional Convention of 1850, which gave more representation to the western counties.

In 1857, Hays moved to Sauk Rapids, Minnesota Territory. President James Buchanan, a fellow Democrat, had appointed him Receiver of Public Moneys and Hays continued as such until Buchanan's presidency ended in 1860, at which time Hays resumed farming near what was then the administrative center of the new state of Minnesota.

== Death and legacy ==
Hays died in 1871 and was interred at the Old Benton County Cemetery in Sauk Rapids.

U.S. House of Representatives
Preceded by Joseph Johnson	Member of the U.S. House of Representatives from Virginia's 20th congressional district March 4, 1841 – March 4, 1843	Succeeded by none
