= VA20 =

VA-20 has the following meanings:

- State Route 20 (Virginia)
- Virginia's 20th congressional district
