= Senator Camden =

Senator Camden may refer to:

- Gideon D. Camden (1805–1891), Virginia judge and later West Virginia State Senator, uncle of Johnson N. Camden
- Johnson N. Camden Jr. (1865–1942), U.S. Senator from Kentucky
- Johnson N. Camden (1828–1908), U.S. Senator from West Virginia from 1881 to 1887
