= Virginia's 14th congressional district =

1793–1853 US congressional district

Coordinates: 38°40′N 81°10′W

- Obsolete district
- Created: 1793
- Eliminated: 1853
- Years active: 1793–1853

Virginia's 14th congressional district is an obsolete congressional district. It was eliminated in 1853 after the 1850 U.S. census. Its last congressman was James M. H. Beale.

== List of members representing the district ==
Member	Party	Term	Cong ress	Electoral history
District established March 4, 1793
Francis Walker (Castle Hill)	Anti-Administration	March 4, 1793 – March 3, 1795	3rd	Elected in 1793. Retired.
Samuel J. Cabell (Wingina)	Democratic-Republican	March 4, 1795 – March 3, 1803	4th 5th 6th 7th	Elected in 1795. Re-elected in 1797. Re-elected in 1799. Re-elected in 1801. Redistricted to the 21st district and lost re-election.
Matthew Clay (Halifax)	Democratic-Republican	March 4, 1803 – March 3, 1813	8th 9th 10th 11th 12th	Redistricted from the 6th district and re-elected in 1803. Re-elected in 1805. Re-elected in 1807. Re-elected in 1809. Re-elected in 1811. Redistricted to the 15th district and lost re-election.
William A. Burwell (Rocky Mount)	Democratic-Republican	March 4, 1813 – February 16, 1821	13th 14th 15th 16th	Redistricted from the 13th district and re-elected in 1813. Re-elected in 1815. Re-elected in 1817. Re-elected in 1819. Retired and died.
Vacant		February 17, 1821 – March 3, 1821	17th	
Jabez Leftwich (Liberty)	Democratic-Republican	March 4, 1821 – March 3, 1823	17th	Elected in 1821. Redistricted to the 7th district.
Charles F. Mercer (Aldie)	Democratic-Republican	March 4, 1823 – March 3, 1825	18th 19th 20th 21st 22nd 23rd 24th 25th 26th	Redistricted from the 8th district and re-elected in 1823. Re-elected in 1825. Re-elected in 1827. Re-elected in 1829. Re-elected in 1831. Re-elected in 1833. Re-elected in 1835. Re-elected in 1837. Re-elected in 1839. Resigned.
Charles F. Mercer (Aldie)	Anti-Jacksonian	March 4, 1825 – March 3, 1837	18th 19th 20th 21st 22nd 23rd 24th 25th 26th	Redistricted from the 8th district and re-elected in 1823. Re-elected in 1825. Re-elected in 1827. Re-elected in 1829. Re-elected in 1831. Re-elected in 1833. Re-elected in 1835. Re-elected in 1837. Re-elected in 1839. Resigned.
Charles F. Mercer (Aldie)	Whig	March 4, 1837 – December 26, 1839	18th 19th 20th 21st 22nd 23rd 24th 25th 26th	Redistricted from the 8th district and re-elected in 1823. Re-elected in 1825. Re-elected in 1827. Re-elected in 1829. Re-elected in 1831. Re-elected in 1833. Re-elected in 1835. Re-elected in 1837. Re-elected in 1839. Resigned.
Vacant		December 27, 1839 – January 24, 1840	26th	
William M. McCarty (Alexandria)	Whig	January 25, 1840 – March 3, 1841	26th	Elected to finish Mercer's term. Lost re-election.
Cuthbert Powell (Upperville)	Whig	March 4, 1841 – March 3, 1843	27th	Elected in 1841. Lost re-election.
George W. Summers (Kanawha)	Whig	March 4, 1843 – March 3, 1845	28th	Elected in 1843. Lost re-election.
Joseph Johnson (Bridgeport)	Democratic	March 4, 1845 – March 3, 1847	29th	Elected in 1845. Retired.
Robert A. Thompson (Kanawha)	Democratic	March 4, 1847 – March 3, 1849	30th	Elected in 1847. Retired.
James M. H. Beale (Point Pleasant)	Democratic	March 4, 1849 – March 3, 1853	31st 32nd	Elected in 1849. Re-elected in 1851. Retired.
District dissolved March 4, 1853
