= Bridgeport High School (West Virginia) =

Location
- 515 Johnson Ave. Bridgeport, Harrison County, West Virginia 26330; United States; 39°17′25″N 80°15′47″W

Information
- School type: Public, high school
- Motto: Roll Tribe
- Founded: 1969 (present location)
- School district: Harrison County Schools
- Superintendent: Dora Stutler
- Principal: Matthew Egbert DeMotto
- Assistant Principals: Mark James Jones; Renee Mathews
- Staff: 69
- Teaching staff: 49.25 (FTE)
- Grades: 9-12
- Enrollment: 814 (2023–2024)
- Student to teacher ratio: 16.53
- Language: English
- Colors: Red and white
- Athletics conference: Big Ten Conference
- Mascot: Indian
- Rival: Robert C. Byrd High School, Fairmont Senior High School
- Feeder schools: Bridgeport Middle School
- Website: www.harcoboe.net/o/bhs

Bridgeport High School (BHS) is a four-year public high school located in the city of Bridgeport, West Virginia, United States, in Harrison County. It operates as part of the county of the Harrison County School District.

The current BHS building opened in 1969 and sits on the 21-acre (8.5 ha) campus. Several major additions have since been added to accommodate the increasing enrollment. The first was completed in 1981. The second addition was completed in 1992, and included the two computer labs. That brought the building to the total 98,000 square feet (9,100 m^{2}) it occupies.

== Awards and recognition ==
During the 2005–06 school year, the Bridgeport High School was awarded the Blue Ribbon School Award of Excellence by the United States Department of Education, the highest award the American school system can receive.

In the academic competitions for the 2006–2007 school year, the BHS took the first place (in some form) in the state for the Science Bowl, the Quiz-Bowl and the Scholastic Chess.

In 2007 the Science Bowl team won the first-place position in the National Science Bowl Hydrogen Fuel Cell Model Car Challenge King of the Hill administered by the United States Department of Energy.

During the 2007–2008 school year the school was ranked as the number one high school in the state of West Virginia by the WV Report, and had eight National Merit Scholars.

== Feeder schools ==
Bridgeport High School students come from a three-feeder school area. Johnson Elementary School and Bridgeport Middle School are located adjacent to BHS on a campus, and the third feeder is Simpson Elementary. Students enrolled in these four schools live in Bridgeport, Anmoore, and surrounding unincorporated areas, such as Quiet Dell, Johnstown, Maple Lake, Corbin Branch, Oral Lake, Brushy Fork, and Romines Mills.

== Athletics and academics ==
Bridgeport High School has a total of 50 state championships in academics and athletics, and one national championship. Bridgeport has also placed state runner-up a total of 38 times. The school also participates in softball, line dancing and wrestling, but it is yet to win or place runner-up in any of these sports.

Bridgeport was scheduled to move from competing in the AA to the AAA class starting in the 2020–2021 school year.

=== State championships ===
Bridgeport West Virginia state championship history
Boys' sports	State titles	Girls' sports	State titles
Baseball	1993, 2000, 2014, 2015, 2016, 2017, 2018, 2019, 2021	Softball	
Basketball	1993, 2001, 2025	Basketball	2013
Cross country	2013, 2014, 2016	Cross country	
Golf	1990, 1992, 1993, 1994, 2003, 2026	Cheerleading	1995, 1996, 1998, 2001, 2019, 2021, 2026
Football	1955, 1972, 1979, 1986, 1988, 2000, 2013, 2014, 2015, 2019, 2024	Volleyball	2018, 2024
Soccer	2026	Soccer	2012
Swimming	2010, 2019, 2025	Swimming	1999, 2000, 2008, 2025
Tennis	2015	Tennis	1995
Track & field	2014, 2018	Track & field	2014, 2016, 2018
Lacrosse^{†}			
Wrestling		Danceline	
Boys' total	33	Girls' total	15
†Lacrosse is yet to be a sanctioned sport.

== Controversy ==
The school was the subject of controversy over a print of artist Warner Sallman's portrait, Head of Christ, that has hung outside the principal's office since the 1970s. Two parents filed a lawsuit against the school in federal district court in Clarksburg, charging the principal, superintendent, and school board with endorsing Christianity over other religions. The parents were represented by the West Virginia chapter of the American Civil Liberties Union and Americans United for Separation of Church and State. The school board accepted an offer from the Alliance Defense Fund to represent the school board and the school's superintendent and principal.

The portrait was stolen from the school on August 17, 2006, after someone broke a window and snatched the picture. The person broke through a window located in the Tech Ed department of the building. The portrait had not been located and the perpetrators were not identified as of November 2006, despite fact that video surveillance footage, fingerprints and DNA evidence were identified at the scene.

On October 6, 2006, the Harrison County School District Board of Education agreed to drop their defense of the case and settle with the case with the ACLU. The settlement ensured that school officials would not restore the portrait or post any other unconstitutional pictures, paintings, posters or other items with religious content.

The school also gained national attention in February 2009 when a theater production of the high school version of the musical Rent was canceled due to homosexual content and other mature themes.

== Notable alumni ==
- Babe Barna, former Major League Baseball outfielder
- Rich Newbrough, former coach in Canadian university football.
- Nancy Jacobs, Maryland State Senator
- Tim Lindsey, former long snapper for the Seattle Seahawks of the NFL
- Harrison Musgrave, baseball player
- Kelli Ward, former Arizona Republican Party chairwoman
