= Ralph Lazier Berkshire =

American judge (1815–1902)

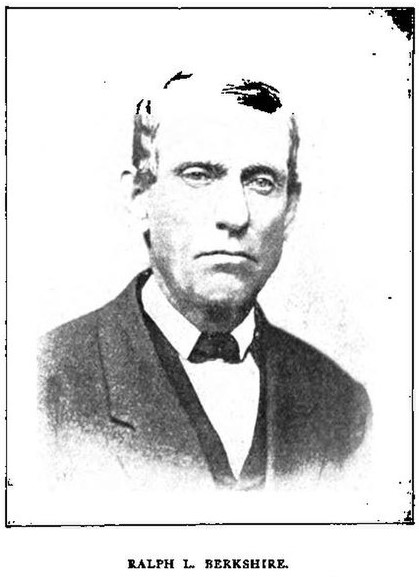

Member of the Wheeling Convention
- In office May 13, 1861 – May 15, 1861

Judge West Virginia Court of Appeals
- In office June 20, 1863 – December 31, 1866
- Preceded by: n/a
- Succeeded by: Edwin Maxwell

Judge West Virginia Court of Appeals
- In office September 10, 1868 – December 31, 1872
- Preceded by: William A. Harrison
- Succeeded by: James Paull

West Virginia Senate from Monongalia County
- In office 1874–1878

Personal details
- Born: April 8, 1815 Bedford County, Pennsylvania, US
- Died: November 8, 1902 (aged 87) Morgantown, US
- Party: Republican
- Profession: Politician, lawyer, judge

Ralph Lazier Berkshire (born April 8, 1815 or 1816; died November 8, 1902) was a lawyer, judge, and Republican politician who helped found the state of West Virginia and became the first chief justice of the Supreme Court of Appeals of West Virginia (from June 20, 1863 to December 31, 1866). Although defeated for re-election, Berkshire again served from September 10, 1868 until December 31, 1872, and later represented Monongalia County in the West Virginia Senate (1874–1878) as well as continuing to practice law.

== Early and family life ==
Berkshire's grandfather John Berkshire had been a Monongalia County pioneer. In 1817 his father, farmer William Berkshire, moved his young family across the Ohio River from what had become Maryland to Monongalia County (then in the state of Virginia). William Berkshire would marry three times; only Ralph and his brother Edmond C. Berkshire, who moved westward on the National Road to Addison, Champaign County, Ohio, would survive of the ten children born to his second wife, the former Ruth Bradget. His father was a Whig and Patriot and a devout Methodist, and against his will was once written in by friends in opposition to Sherrard Clemens. When he was 18, the home-schooled Ralph Berkshire left his family's farm, moved to Morgantown and apprenticed himself to a carpenter. In 1838, he began to read law with Guy R.C. Allen in Morgantown.

In 1842 Ralph Berkshire married Maria L. Chadwick, daughter of James Chadwick. Three children survived their parents (Jane Ann Berkshire Wagner, Mary R. Berkshire and Charles B. Berkshire); another daughter died as an infant and another after marrying.

== Career ==
Judges Joseph L. Fry, Edwin S. Duncan and Daniel Smith admitted Berkshire and Waitman T. Willey to the Virginia bar in Morgantown in 1840. In 1847, the local judges appointed Berkshire as Monongalia county's prosecuting attorney. He succeeding Matthew Gay (who had held that position for 24 years) and won election to that position in 1852, the Virginia Constitution as amended the previous year having transformed the commonwealth's attorney's position into an elective office. Berkshire ran as the Whig candidate for circuit court judge in 1861, but George W. Thompson was elected instead. Meanwhile, Berkshire ardently opposed secession and the resolutions he helped draft after the Virginia Secession Convention of 1861 were published by the National Intelligencer and other newspapers as the "first loyal voice from West Virginia".

Berkshire won election as one of Monongalia County's delegates to the first and second Wheeling Conventions of May and June 1861, although other professional commitments prevented him from attending the first convention. When Judge Thompson refused to take the oaths required by the Wheeling Conventions, Berkshire was elected in his place (defeating Major Good, who later became a judge). He became circuit judge of the 19th Judicial Circuit of Virginia, until resigning on June 20, 1863.

As West Virginia became a state in its own right, the Union Convention nominated Berkshire as one of the first judges of the new Supreme Court of Appeals. He resigned his trial post and accepted the appellate position on June 20, 1863. The new appeals judges drew lots and he drew the shortest term of office, four years, but was also chosen to lead the body. He was defeated for re-election in 1866 by fellow Republican Edwin Maxwell (then the new state's attorney general), but was appointed to serve out the remainder of William A. Harrison's term after that judge resigned in September 1868, and Berkshire won election in 1868 for a new term. However, new elections were held in 1872 under the new state constitution adopted that year, and Democrats replaced all Republicans, including Berkshire. Upon leaving the bench, Berkshire practiced law with George C. Sturgiss, who for a time served as U.S. Attorney and later became a U.S. Congressman. Monongalia County voters elected Berkshire to represent them in the state senate in 1874. In 1888 and 1892 he strongly supported Benjamin Harrison for President and was a delegate-at-large to the Republican national convention of 1888.

== Death ==
Berkshire died of pneumonia in 1902. He was buried in Oak Grove Cemetery in Morgantown.
