= Isaac S. Pennybacker =

American politician, lawyer and judge (1805–1847)

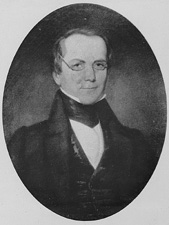

United States Senator from Virginia
- In office December 3, 1845 – January 12, 1847
- Preceded by: William Cabell Rives
- Succeeded by: James Murray Mason

Judge of the United States District Court for the Western District of Virginia
- In office April 23, 1839 – December 6, 1845
- Appointed by: Martin Van Buren
- Preceded by: Alexander Caldwell
- Succeeded by: John White Brockenbrough

Member of the U.S. House of Representatives from Virginia's 16th district
- In office March 4, 1837 – March 3, 1839
- Preceded by: James M. H. Beale
- Succeeded by: Green Berry Samuels

Personal details
- Born: Isaac Samuels Pennybacker; September 3, 1805 Pine Forge, Virginia, U.S.
- Died: January 12, 1847 (aged 41) Washington, D.C., U.S.
- Resting place: Woodbine Cemetery; Harrisonburg, Virginia
- Party: Democratic
- Relations: Green Berry Samuels (cousin)
- Education: Winchester Law School
- Occupation: Politician; lawyer; judge

Isaac Samuels Pennybacker (September 3, 1805 – January 12, 1847) was an American politician, lawyer, and judge. A member of the Democratic Party, he served as United States representative, a United States senator from Virginia, and a United States district judge of the United States District Court for the Western District of Virginia.

== Early life ==
Born on September 3, 1805, at Pine Forge near Newmarket, Shenandoah County, Virginia, Pennybacker attended an "old field" school and the Winchester Law School. He was admitted to the bar and entered private practice in Harrisonburg, Rockingham County, Virginia until 1837.

== Career ==
=== U.S. House of Representatives ===
Pennybacker was elected as a Democrat from Virginia's 16th congressional district to the United States House of Representatives of the 25th United States Congress, serving from March 4, 1837, to March 3, 1839. He declined the office of United States Attorney General offered him by President Martin Van Buren and that of Justice of the Supreme Court of Virginia.

=== Federal judicial service ===
Pennybacker received a recess appointment from President Martin Van Buren on April 23, 1839, to a seat on the United States District Court for the Western District of Virginia vacated by Judge Alexander Caldwell. He was nominated to the same position by President Van Buren on January 23, 1840. He was confirmed by the United States Senate on February 17, 1840, and received his commission the same day. His service terminated on December 6, 1845, due to his resignation.

=== U.S. Senate ===
Pennybacker was elected as a Democrat to the United States Senate to fill the vacancy in the term beginning March 4, 1845, caused by the failure of the Virginia General Assembly to elect, and served from December 3, 1845, until his death. He was Chairman of the Committee on Claims for the 29th United States Congress.

== Other service ==
President James K. Polk named Pennybacker to the very first Board of Regents of the Smithsonian Institution, a group which included Vice-President George M. Dallas, Chief Justice Roger B. Taney, Washington, D.C. Mayor William Winston Seaton, Senator Sidney Breese, United States Representative William Jervis Hough, United States Representative Robert Dale Owen, United States Representative Henry Washington Hilliard, Rufus Choate, Richard Rush, Dr. Benjamin Rush, William C. Preston, Alexander Dallas Bache, and Joseph Gilbert Totten, among others, who met for the first time in September 1846.

== Personal life and death ==
Pennybacker was a cousin of Green Berry Samuels, a United States representative from Virginia.

He died on January 12, 1847, in Washington, D.C. He was interred in Woodbine Cemetery in Harrisonburg.

== See also ==
- List of members of the United States Congress who died in office (1790–1899)

== Sources ==
- "Isaac Samuels Pennybacker". Biographical Directory of the United States Congress.
- Hon. Armistead M. Dobie, "Federal District Judges in Virginia before the Civil War," 12 F.R.D. 451 (1951,1952) (viewed on Westlaw)

U.S. House of Representatives
Preceded by James M. H. Beale	Member of the U.S. House of Representatives from Virginia's 16th congressional district 1837–1839	Succeeded by Green Berry Samuels
Legal offices
Preceded by Alexander Caldwell	Judge of the United States District Court for the Western District of Virginia; 1839–1845	Succeeded by John White Brockenbrough
U.S. Senate
Preceded by William Cabell Rives	U.S. senator (Class 1) from Virginia; 1845–1847; Served alongside: William S. Archer	Succeeded by James Murray Mason
