= Bridgeport, West Virginia =

City in West Virginia, US

- City
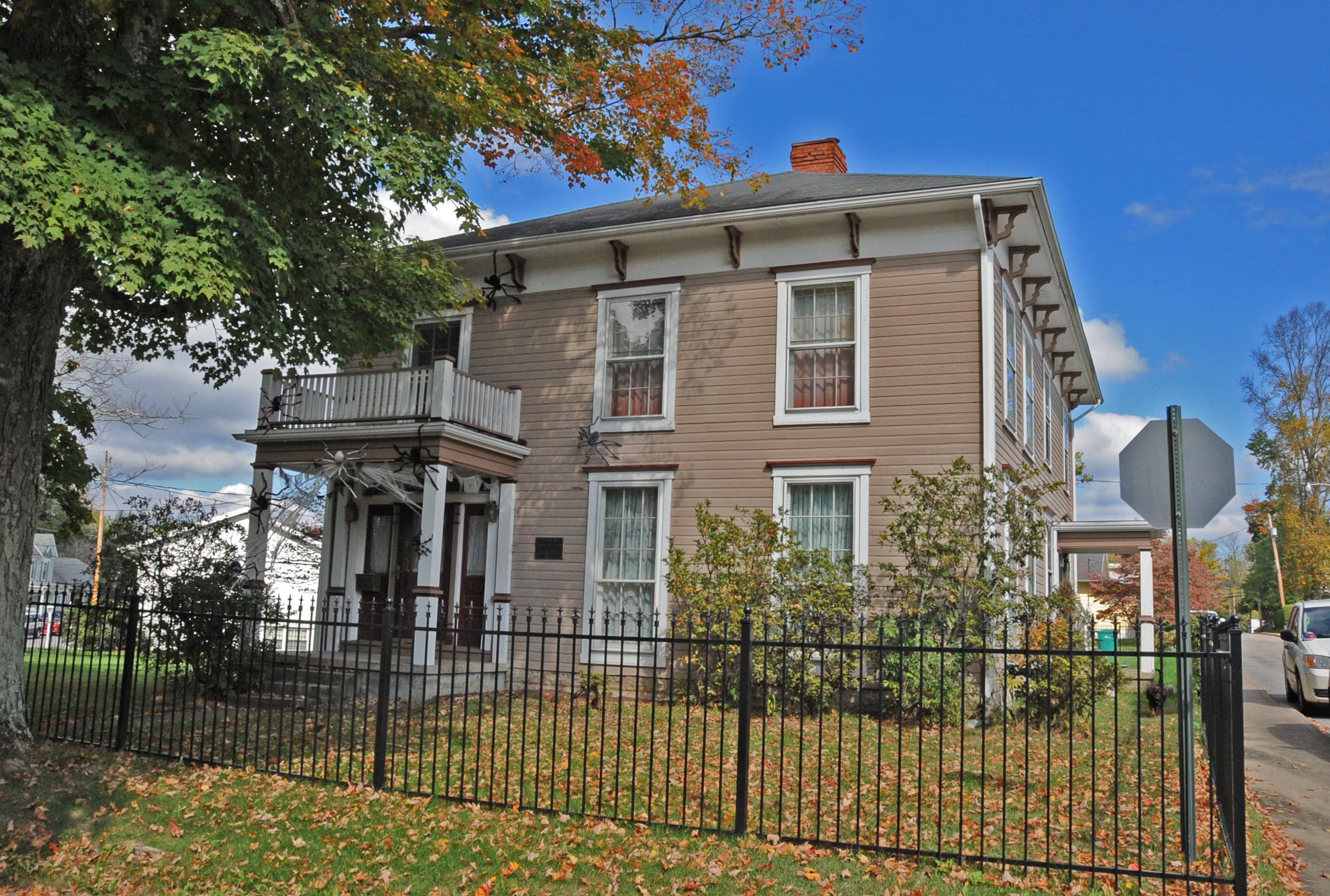
- Governor Joseph Johnson House

- Logo
- Motto: Opportunity Lives Here
- Interactive map of Bridgeport, West Virginia
- Location within West Virginia Location within the United States
- Coordinates: 39°17′48″N 80°15′5″W
- Country: United States
- State: West Virginia
- County: Harrison
- Chartered: 1816

Government
  - Type: Manager Plan
  - City Manager: Joe Shuttleworth (interim)
  - Mayor: Robert Matheny

Area
  - Total: 10.73 sq mi (27.80 km^{2})
  - Land: 10.69 sq mi (27.69 km^{2})
  - Water: 0.042 sq mi (0.11 km^{2})
- Elevation: 1,020 ft (311 m)

Population (2020)
  - Total: 9,336
  - Estimate (2025): 9,427
  - Density: 827.1/sq mi (319.33/km^{2})
- Time zone: UTC-5 (Eastern (EST))
  - Summer (DST): UTC-4 (EDT)
- ZIP code: 26330
- Area codes: 304, 681
- FIPS code: 54-10180
- GNIS feature ID: 1536341
- Website: https://www.bridgeportwv.gov/

Bridgeport is a city in eastern Harrison County, West Virginia, United States. The population was 9,336 at the 2020 census. It is part of the Clarksburg micropolitan area in North Central West Virginia.

== History ==
Trapper and fur trader John Simpson entered the area in 1764 and gave his name to Simpson Creek. Bridgeport was first settled between 1771 and 1774, when settlers constructed a fort. Simpson Creek Baptist Church was one of the first churches west of the Allegheny Mountains.

The town was named for a bridge across Simpson Creek, although it is unclear which bridge inspired the name. Early settlers built a pontoon-style bridge from logs tied together with hickory branches, followed by a wooden covered bridge in the early 19th century. According to local tradition, Joseph Johnson, who later became Governor of Virginia, viewed the bridge as a port and used the name Bridgeport when he sought a charter for a town on 15 acres (6.1 ha) of his land. Another account holds that the community was originally called "Bridge Fort" for two forts constructed by early settlers and that a mapmaker mistakenly recorded the name as Bridgeport. The town was chartered in 1816 and incorporated in 1887.

The first recorded gristmill in Bridgeport was constructed along Simpson Creek between 1771 and 1787, and stockyards were established in the early 19th century. The Bridgeport section of the Northwestern Virginia Turnpike opened in 1838, providing a direct road to Clarksburg, and stagecoach service began in 1852. The turnpike later became part of U.S. Route 50. The arrival of the Baltimore and Ohio Railroad in the 1850s made Bridgeport an important shipping point for the regional cattle industry.

During the American Civil War, residents of Bridgeport supported both the Union and the Confederacy. On April 30, 1863, Confederate general William E. Jones captured a company of Union soldiers near the town during the Jones–Imboden Raid. His forces also captured civilian railroad employees, burned bridges and looted stores.

Several manufacturers operated in Bridgeport during the early 20th century. The West Virginia Pottery Company, incorporated in 1907, produced stoneware including jugs and jars. The Bridgeport Lamp Chimney Company was organized in 1904 and was producing approximately 24,000 lamp chimneys per day by 1923. Its property later became the home of the Master Glass Company, which manufactured glass marbles until 1973.

United Hospital Center opened in Bridgeport in 2010, and several aeronautics companies are located at the North Central West Virginia Airport. Charles Pointe is a mixed-use community along Interstate 79, while White Oaks is a business park.

== Geography ==
According to the United States Census Bureau, the city has a total area of 10.734 square miles (27.80 km^{2}), of which 10.691 square miles (27.69 km^{2}) is land and 0.043 square miles (0.11 km^{2}) is water.

== Demographics ==
Historical population
Census	Pop.	Note	%±
1880	395		—
1890	455		15.2%
1900	464		2.0%
1910	577		24.4%
1920	1,346		133.3%
1930	1,567		16.4%
1940	1,581		0.9%
1950	2,414		52.7%
1960	4,199		73.9%
1970	4,777		13.8%
1980	6,604		38.2%
1990	6,739		2.0%
2000	7,306		8.4%
2010	8,149		11.5%
2020	9,336		14.6%
2025 (est.)	9,427		1.0%
U.S. Decennial Census

=== 2020 census ===
As of the 2020 census, Bridgeport had a population of 9,336 and 3,992 households. The median age was 43.6 years; 20.8% of residents were under the age of 18 and 22.4% were 65 years of age or older.

Racial composition as of the 2020 census
Race	Number	Percent
White	8,393	89.9%
Black or African American	106	1.1%
American Indian and Alaska Native	12	0.1%
Asian	269	2.9%
Native Hawaiian and Other Pacific Islander	0	0.0%
Some other race	52	0.6%
Two or more races	504	5.4%
Hispanic or Latino (of any race)	255	2.7%

== Economy ==
Health care, aerospace, and government are major parts of Bridgeport's economy. In 2024, United Hospital Center was the city's largest employer, providing more than 2,500 jobs. Pratt & Whitney was the second-largest employer, with 450 jobs.

Several aerospace companies operate at the North Central West Virginia Airport, including Pratt & Whitney, Aurora Flight Sciences, and Mitsubishi Heavy Industries RJ Aviation.

Retail and commercial development includes Meadowbrook Mall, which opened in 1982, the Charles Pointe mixed-use development, and the White Oaks business park.

The FBI Criminal Justice Information Services Division is located in nearby Clarksburg and is a major employer. The location of the facility was the subject of an annexation dispute in 1991, when Bridgeport and Clarksburg both sought to annex the site. The Harrison County Commission sided with Clarksburg. Bridgeport later annexed adjacent farmland that became Charles Pointe and White Oaks.

== Arts and culture ==
=== Historic sites ===
Simpson Creek Baptist Church was established around 1770 by John Sutton. e-WV: The West Virginia Encyclopedia identifies it as one of the first two Baptist churches established west of the mountains that remain active.

Three properties associated with Bridgeport are listed on the National Register of Historic Places: the Bridgeport Lamp Chimney Company Bowstring Concrete Arch Bridge and Governor Joseph Johnson House in the city, and the Simpson Creek Covered Bridge in the Bridgeport vicinity.

The Simpson Creek Covered Bridge dates to 1881 and was built by Asa S. Hugill. Bridgeport Lamp Chimney Company Bowstring Concrete Arch Bridge was completed in 1924 by Frank Duff McEnteer and the Concrete Steel Bridge Company. It was built for the Bridgeport Lamp Chimney Company to carry handcarts between its glass plant and a warehouse across Simpson Creek.

The Governor Joseph Johnson House, also known as Oakdale, was built for Joseph Johnson in 1818 and remodeled in the Italianate style around 1840.

Bridgeport Cemetery was established as a municipal cemetery in 1939 through the consolidation of the Old Baptist Brick Church Graveyard, the Old Masonic Cemetery, and the Independent Order of Odd Fellows Cemetery, along with additional land. The oldest section, the Old Baptist Brick Church Graveyard, dates to 1770. The cemetery contains the graves of 17 known veterans of the American Revolutionary War and former Virginia governor Joseph Johnson.

== Parks and recreation ==
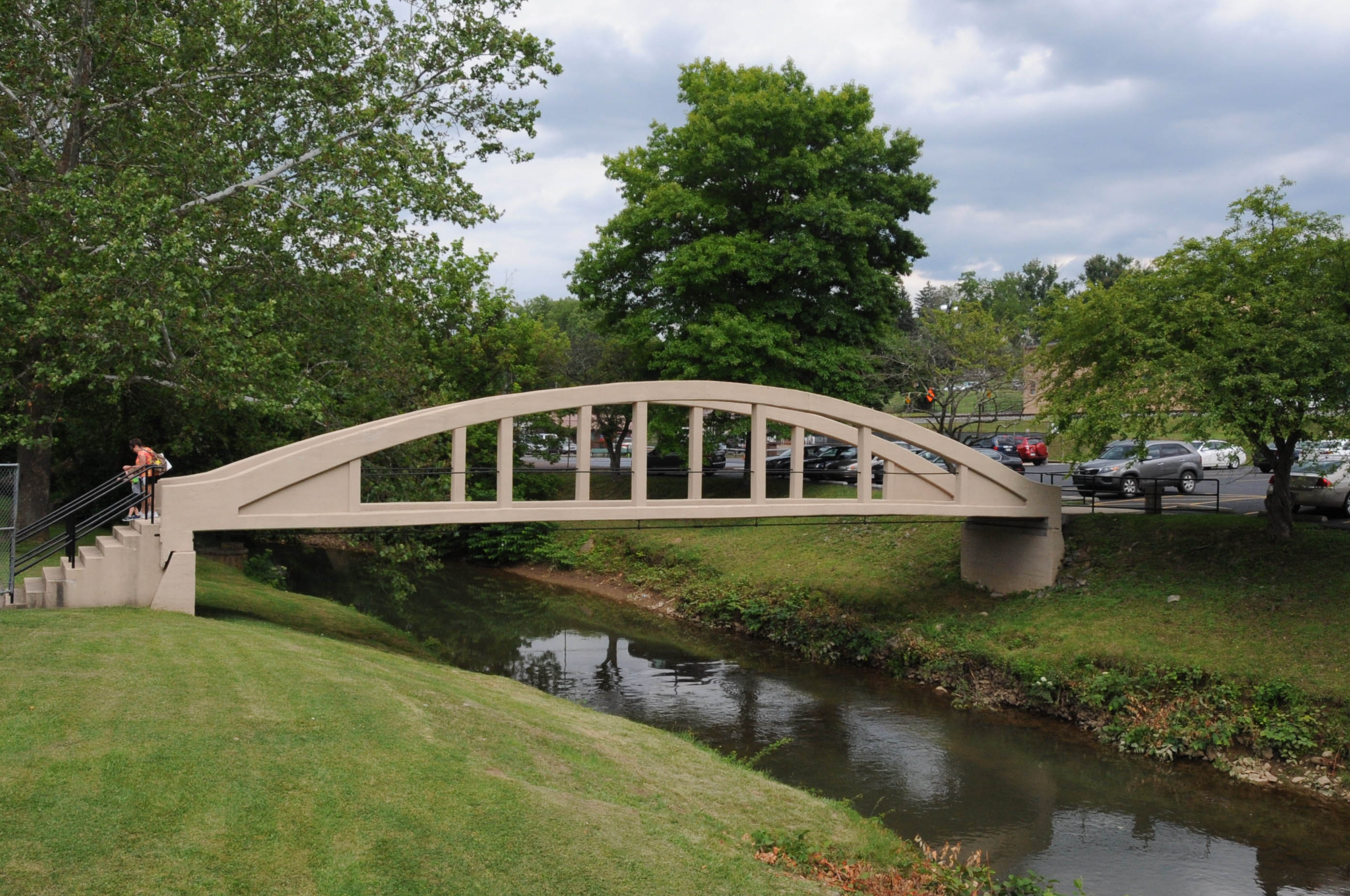
The Bridgeport Lamp Chimney Company Bowstring Concrete Arch Bridge

The city operates several parks and recreational facilities, including Bridgeport City Park, Deegan and Hinkle Lakes Park, Compton Park, the Benedum Civic Center, and The Bridge Sports Complex. The Bridge Sports Complex opened in 2021 and includes indoor swimming pools, sports courts, a turf field, a running track, fitness facilities, and outdoor ballfields.

The Pete Dye Golf Club, located just outside the city limits, is a private 18-hole golf course designed by Pete Dye. The course opened in July 1993. In its 2025–26 rankings, Golf Digest ranked the course 92nd among America's 100 Greatest Golf Courses and second among courses in West Virginia.

== Government ==
Bridgeport operates under a Manager-Mayor Plan of government. The city's governing body consists of an elected mayor, recorder, and five city council members. The mayor serves as a member and presiding officer of the council. The city manager is appointed by the council and serves as the administrative authority, managing city affairs under the council's supervision.

In 2014, Mayor Mario Blount resigned from office after being charged with federal offenses involving the unlawful distribution of prescription painkillers. City Recorder Robert Greer became acting mayor following Blount's resignation. Blount subsequently pleaded guilty to three federal charges and was sentenced in February 2015 to three years in federal prison.

== Education ==
Bridgeport is served by Harrison County Schools. The city's public schools are Bridgeport High School, Bridgeport Middle School, Johnson Elementary School and Simpson Elementary School. Bridgeport High School opened at its present location in 1969 and serves grades 9 through 12. Bridgeport Middle School and Johnson Elementary School are located on the same educational campus as the high school, while Simpson Elementary School is located on Worthington Drive.

The Bridgeport Public Library was founded in 1956 by businessman and philanthropist Michael Late Benedum, with support from the Claude Worthington Benedum Foundation. The library was originally located in the Benedum Civic Center. In 1994, residents and businesses raised more than $1.3 million to purchase and renovate a former insurance building on Johnson Avenue for use as the library's permanent home. The library is operated as a department of the city government and is overseen by a board appointed by the Bridgeport City Council.

== Media ==
The Bridgeport News is a weekly newspaper serving Bridgeport.

WDTV, a television station licensed to Weston, maintains its main studio on Television Drive in Bridgeport.

WVIW is an FM radio station licensed to Bridgeport and operated by VCY America.

== Infrastructure ==
=== Transportation ===
Bridgeport is located along Interstate 79 and U.S. Route 50, which intersect near the city at Interstate 79 exit 119. Additional interstate access is provided by exits 121, serving Meadowbrook Road, and 124, serving West Virginia Route 279 and the North Central West Virginia Airport. West Virginia Route 279, also known locally as Jerry Dove Drive, connects the airport and eastern development areas with U.S. Route 50.

The North Central West Virginia Airport is a public commercial airport located in Bridgeport and operated by the Benedum Airport Authority. It serves north-central West Virginia, including the Bridgeport, Clarksburg, Fairmont, Morgantown and Weston areas. Allegiant Air provides less-than-daily service to Orlando–Sanford and seasonal service to leisure destinations. SkyWest Airlines, operating as United Express, provides year-round service to Chicago–O'Hare and Washington–Dulles.

=== Public safety ===
Law enforcement services are provided by the Bridgeport Police Department, which is headquartered at the City Hall complex on West Main Street.

Fire protection and emergency medical services are provided by the Bridgeport Fire Department, which operates a main station on West Main Street and a second station near United Hospital Center. The department has an Insurance Services Office Class 1 rating.

The fire department began transitioning from an all-volunteer organization to paid staffing in the 1970s. It continued to operate as a combination paid-and-volunteer department for decades. In 2022, Fire Chief Phil Hart described Bridgeport as the only combination department in West Virginia with an ISO Class 1 rating. A subsequent city publication described the department as a career department.

Bridgeport began charging a fire service fee to properties within the city in 2007. In July 2011, the city extended the fee to properties outside the city limits that were within the Bridgeport Fire Department's designated first-due area. The outside-city fee drew opposition from more than 100 residents, some of whom sought changes to the first-due-area boundaries. In Adam Davisson and Stacey S. Davisson v. City of Bridgeport, the Supreme Court of Appeals of West Virginia upheld the city's authority to assess the fire service fee on users outside its municipal boundaries and affirmed that the fee was reasonable.

== Notable people ==
=== Business and media ===
- Michael Late Benedum – oil and natural gas businessman and philanthropist; born in Bridgeport
- Mike Florio – sportswriter and founder of ProFootballTalk.com; has lived in Bridgeport for more than three decades
- T. Michael Martin – young adult novelist and author of The End Games; Bridgeport native and Bridgeport High School graduate

=== Government and politics ===
- Joseph Johnson – governor of Virginia and U.S. representative; moved to Bridgeport in 1801 and died there in 1877
- Waldo P. Johnson – U.S. senator and Confederate States senator from Missouri; born in Bridgeport

=== Sports ===
- Tim Lindsey – professional football long snapper; from Bridgeport and a Bridgeport High School graduate
- Billy Joe Mantooth – professional football linebacker; Bridgeport resident at the time of his death in 1986
- Harrison Musgrave – Major League Baseball pitcher; Bridgeport resident and Bridgeport High School graduate
