= James M. H. Beale =

American politician

U.S. Representative from Virginia
- In office 1833–1837

U.S. Representative from Virginia
- In office 1849–1853

Personal details
- Born: February 7, 1786
- Died: August 2, 1866 (aged 80)
- Party: Democratic

James M. H. Beale (February 7, 1786 – August 2, 1866) was an American politician, planter and slave holder who represented Virginia in the United States House of Representatives from 1833 to 1837 and from 1849 to 1853. Beale unsuccessfully ran for Virginia's Lieutenant Governor as the Know Nothing candidate in 1855.

== Biography ==
Beale was born James Madison Hite Beale in Mount Airy, Virginia. He pursued some preparatory studies then ran his plantation property. He was elected to the State house of delegates and served from 1818 to 1819.

Beale was elected as a Jacksonian to the Twenty-third and Twenty-fourth Congresses (March 4, 1833 – March 3, 1837). He served as chairman of the Committee on Invalid Pensions (Twenty-fourth Congress). He resumed agricultural pursuits.

Beale was elected as a Democrat to the Thirty-first and Thirty-second Congresses (March 4, 1849 – March 3, 1853). He served as chairman of the Committee on Expenditures on Public Buildings (Thirty-first Congress), Committee on Manufactures (Thirty-second Congress). He declined to be a candidate for renomination in 1852.

In 1855, Beale left the Democratic Party for the Know Nothing Party to run for Lieutenant Governor on the ticket of Thomas Flournoy. Although Flournoy and Beale were both slave owners, the opposing Democrat candidates accused them of being abolitionists associated with the Northern states' anti-slavery movement. Flournoy and Beale lost the election in a landslide.

Beale died in Putnam County, W.Virginia, August 2, 1866. He was interred in Beale Cemetery, near Gallipolis Ferry, Mason County, W.Virginia.

== Sources ==
- United States Congress. "James M. H. Beale (id: B000266)". Biographical Directory of the United States Congress.

U.S. House of Representatives
Preceded by William Armstrong	Member of the U.S. House of Representatives from Virginia's 16th congressional district March 4, 1833 – March 3, 1837	Succeeded by Isaac S. Pennybacker
Preceded by Robert A. Thompson	Member of the U.S. House of Representatives from Virginia's 14th congressional district March 4, 1849 – March 3, 1853	Succeeded by District eliminated
