= William Alexander Harris (Virginia politician) =

American politician

Member of the U.S. House of Representatives from Virginia's 16th district
- In office March 4, 1841 – March 3, 1843
- Preceded by: Green B. Samuels
- Succeeded by: District eliminated

Member of the Virginia House of Delegates
- In office 1830-1831

Personal details
- Born: August 24, 1805 Fauquier County, Virginia
- Died: March 28, 1864 (aged 58) Pike County, Missouri
- Resting place: Riverview Cemetery, Louisiana, Missouri
- Party: Democratic
- Profession: lawyer, newsman

William Alexander Harris (August 24, 1805 – March 28, 1864) was a Virginia lawyer and politician who served as a U.S. representative from Virginia.

== Early and family life ==
Born near Warrenton, Virginia, Harris completed an academic course which included the study of law. He married and had children. His firstborn son, also William Alexander Harris would be educated in Washington, D.C., and at the Virginia Military Institute, volunteered for Confederate States Army service, and after serving in various mostly staff positions during the war, moved to Kansas and became a railroad official, as well as continued his father's political tradition, winning election to the U.S. Congress as a Populist, and later serving in the Kansas state senate. His other son Murray Harris (1848–1923) moved to Texas after the conflict, but their sister, Leilia Harris Robinson (1857–1914), married a local Missouri lawyer turned judge and railroad attorney.

== Career ==
He was admitted to the bar and commenced practice in the 1820s in Luray, Virginia. Harris may have been one of the fifteen original men to have thoroughly explored the Luray Cave in 1825. The Shenandoah Herald printed an article he had written in that year, which seems the first to describing the site, which later became a tourist attraction. Voters elected him as their delegate to the Virginia House of Delegates from 1830 to 1831, and he sponsored the bill to create Page County, Virginia. He then became the new county's first Clerk of the Court of Page County, beginning 23 May 1831, and also served as the local Commonwealth's attorney (prosecutor) and as one of the commissioners to oversee the construction of the county offices. In September, 1837, the elder Harris continued in his multi-faceted roles and was responsible for donations for the opening of a road east through the Blue Ridge at Milam's Gap. In 1840, Harris became a Presidential elector on the Van Buren-Johnson ticket.

Harris resigned his position as Clerk of the Court after winning election as a Democrat to the Twenty-seventh Congress (March 4, 1841 – March 3, 1843). The previous Congressman, Green Berry Samuels, had accepted a position on the Virginia Court of Appeals (later Virginia Supreme Court).

Before his retiring to private life the elder Harris held several other positions including editor of the Spectator and The Constitution in Washington, D.C., and also chargé d'affaires to the Argentine Republic from 1846 to 1851. He moved to Pike County, Missouri and later returned to Washington, D.C., as editor of the Washington Union and printer to the United States Senate, 1857–1859.

== Death and legacy ==
Harris died in Pike County, Missouri, March 28, 1864, and was interred in Riverview Cemetery, Louisiana, Missouri.

== Sources ==
- United States Congress. "William Alexander Harris (id: H000257)". Biographical Directory of the United States Congress.
- Moore, Robert H. II, Short Historical Sketches of Page County, Virginia and Its People, Volume 2 ("The Harris family in Page County"); Heritage Books, Inc., 2005, pp. 193–194.

U.S. House of Representatives
Preceded by Green B. Samuels	Member of the U.S. House of Representatives from Virginia's 16th congressional district 1841-1843	Succeeded by District eliminated
