= Bridgeport Lamp Chimney Company Bowstring Concrete Arch Bridge =

- U.S. National Register of Historic Places
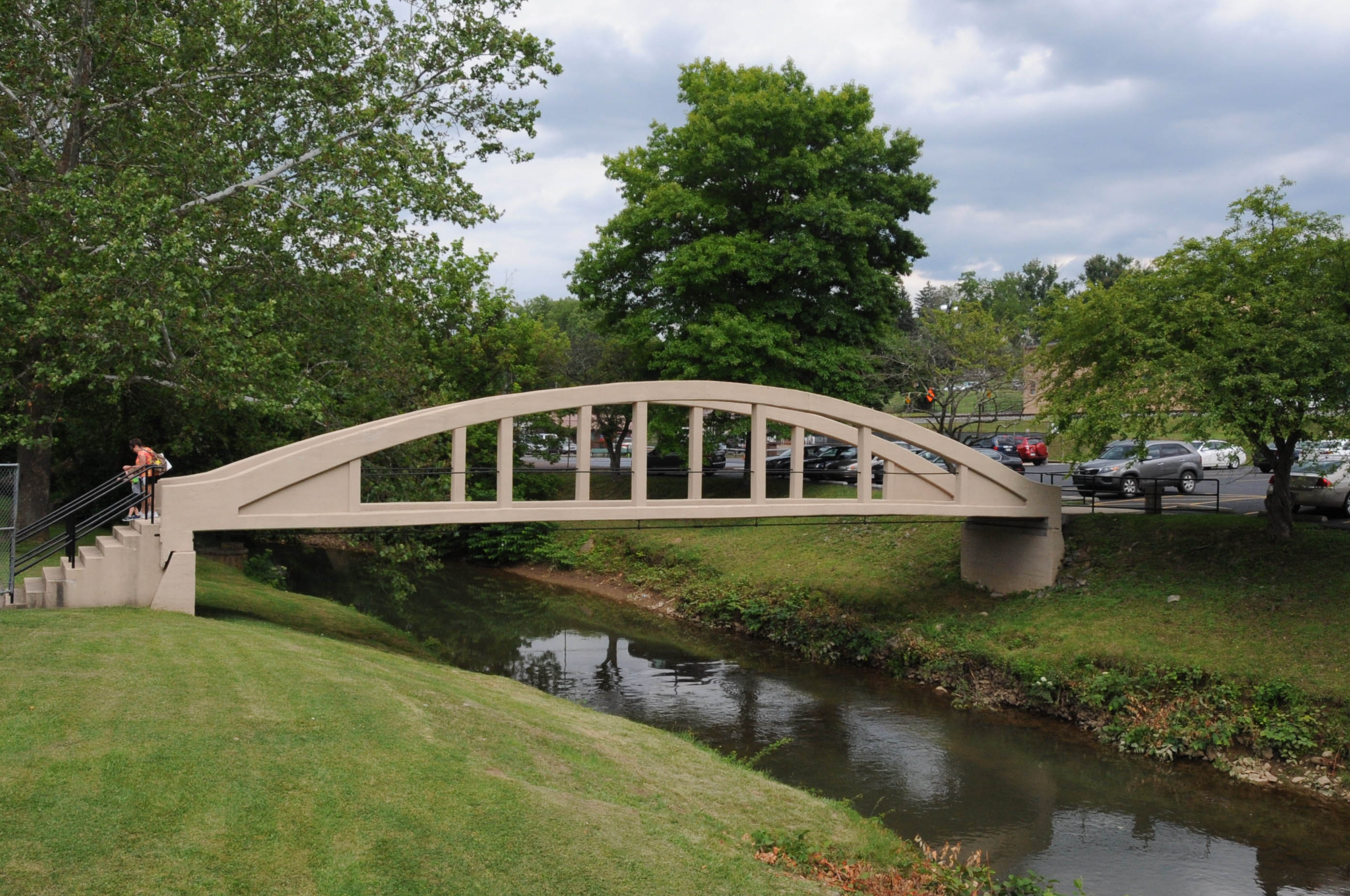
- In June 2016

- Location within West Virginia Location within the United States
- Location: Between Mechanic Street and B&O Railroad tracks, Bridgeport, West Virginia
- Coordinates: 39°17′3″N 80°15′21″W
- Built: 1924
- Architect: Frank Duff McEnteer
- NRHP reference No.: 96001571
- Added to NRHP: January 27, 1997

The Bridgeport Lamp Chimney Company Bowstring Concrete Arch Bridge is located between Mechanic Street and Baltimore and Ohio Railroad tracks in Bridgeport, West Virginia. The bridge was constructed in 1924, designed by Frank McEnteer. This elegant bowstring reinforced concrete arch bridge represents a traditional bridge type which was readily adapted to what was essentially a new construction material: reinforced concrete. Unlike a rail or road bridge, this bridge can be considered an unusual pedestrian bridge in that it was built by the Bridgeport Lamp Chimney Company in 1924 to provide access from the glass plant to a warehouse on the other side of Simpson Creek. The bridge was designed to carry hand carts with glass products across the river to the warehouse. The bridge remains the only evidence of the original works, and its successor, Master Glass Company. Thus the bridge stands in splendid isolation from any other structure.

== Structure details ==
The bridge is 70 feet 4 inches (21.44 m) long by 8 feet 11.8 inches (2.738 m) in width. The height of the center line transom is 10 feet (3.0 m) above the deck. Although hidden from view, a notable feature is the proprietary reinforcement used throughout the structure. The principal reinforcing bars are either of the patented Havemeyer reinforcement produced by the Concrete Steel Company of New York, or a similar bar produced by Cambria Iron Works of Johnstown, Pennsylvania. It was an era of intense competition among reinforcing bar manufacturers with each individual deformed bar pattern carefully protected by patents. Smooth bars of approximately 1/4 inch (6.4 mm) diameter were employed for stirrups throughout the bridge structure.

- Arch: 12 by 19 inches (300 by 480 mm)
- Tension ties: 9 by 15 inches (230 by 380 mm)
- Deck: 3 inches (76 mm)
- Verticals: 8 by 8 inches (200 by 200 mm)

== Historical significance ==
The reinforced concrete bowstring arch erected in 1924 by Frank Duff McEnteer and his Concrete Steel Bridge Company is an expression of the bridge builders art executed by one of the pioneers in the use of reinforced concrete for both bridges and buildings. The bridge is a reminder of the early glass industry that flourished in the Clarksburg area and in the state as a whole. The glass industry which found a favorable business climate based on cheap natural gas and abundant quartzite for producing products ranging from utilitarian bottles to the finest cut glass, is not as wide as it once was.

== See also ==
- List of bridges documented by the Historic American Engineering Record in West Virginia
