= Virginia's 20th congressional district =

1803–1843 US congressional district

Coordinates: 39°0′N 80°20′W

- Obsolete district
- Created: 1803
- Eliminated: 1843
- Years active: 1803–1843

Virginia's 20th congressional district is an obsolete congressional district. It was eliminated in 1843 after the 1840 U.S. census. Its last congressman was Samuel L. Hays.

== List of members representing the district ==
Representative	Party	Term	Cong ress	Electoral history
District established March 4, 1803
Thomas Newton Jr. (Norfolk)	Democratic-Republican	March 4, 1803 – March 3, 1813	8th 9th 10th 11th 12th	Redistricted from the 11th district and re-elected in 1803. Re-elected in 1805. Re-elected in 1807. Re-elected in 1809. Re-elected in 1811. Redistricted to the 21st district.
James Johnson (Lawrenceville)	Democratic-Republican	March 4, 1813 – February 2, 1820	13th 14th 15th 16th	Elected in 1813. Re-elected in 1815. Re-elected in 1817. Re-elected in 1819. Resigned to become Norfolk Customs Collector.
Vacant		February 2, 1820 – August 28, 1820	16th	
John C. Gray (Courtland)	Democratic-Republican	August 28, 1820 – March 3, 1821	16th	Elected to finish Johnson's term. Lost re-election.
Arthur Smith (Smithfield)	Democratic-Republican	March 4, 1821 – March 3, 1823	17th	Elected in 1821. Retired.
John Floyd (Newbern)	Democratic-Republican	March 4, 1823 – March 3, 1825	18th 19th 20th	Redistricted from the 5th district and re-elected in 1823. Re-elected in 1825. Re-elected in 1827. Retired.
John Floyd (Newbern)	Jacksonian	March 4, 1825 – March 3, 1829	18th 19th 20th	Redistricted from the 5th district and re-elected in 1823. Re-elected in 1825. Re-elected in 1827. Retired.
Robert Craig (Montgomery County)	Jacksonian	March 4, 1829 – March 3, 1833	21st 22nd	Elected in 1829. Re-elected in 1831. Lost re-election.
John J. Allen (Clarksburg)	Anti-Jacksonian	March 4, 1833 – March 3, 1835	23rd	Elected in 1833. Lost re-election.
Joseph Johnson (Bridgeport)	Jacksonian	March 4, 1835 – March 3, 1837	24th	Elected in 1835. [data missing]
Joseph Johnson (Bridgeport)	Democratic	March 4, 1837 – March 3, 1841	25th 26th	Elected in 1837. Re-elected in 1839. Retired.
Samuel L. Hays (Stewarts Creek)	Democratic	March 4, 1841 – March 3, 1843	27th	Elected in 1841. Lost re-election.
District dissolved March 4, 1843
