= George W. Summers =

American politician (1804–1868)

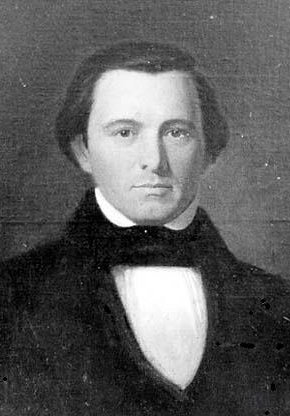

Judge for the 18th Judicial Circuit
- In office 1852 – 1859
- Preceded by: David McComas
- Succeeded by: David McComas

Member of the U.S. House of Representatives from Virginia
- In office March 4, 1841 – March 3, 1845
- Preceded by: Andrew Beirne (19th); Henry A. Wise (14th)
- Succeeded by: District eliminated (19th); Joseph Johnson (14th)
- Constituency: 19th district (1841-43); 14th district (1843-45)

Member of the Virginia House of Delegates from the Kanawha County district
- In office December 6, 1830 – December 2, 1832
- Preceded by: Matthew Dunbar
- Succeeded by: James H. Fry

Member of the Virginia House of Delegates from the Kanawha County district
- In office December 1, 1834 – December 4, 1836
- Preceded by: James H. Fry
- Succeeded by: Andrew Donnelly, Jr.

Personal details
- Born: March 4, 1804 Fairfax County, Virginia, U.S.
- Died: September 19, 1868 (aged 64) Charleston, West Virginia, U.S.
- Party: Whig
- Profession: Politician, Lawyer, Judge

George William Summers (March 4, 1804 – September 19, 1868) was an attorney, politician, and judge from Virginia (and what became West Virginia during the American Civil War).

== Early and family life ==
Summers was born in Fairfax County, Virginia to George Summers and his wife, the former Nancy Ann Smith Radcliffe. His father represented Fairfax County in the Virginia House of Delegates for four terms, then moved his family to Kanawha County (later Putnam County) in 1814. Young George Summers attended what later became Washington and Lee University in Lexington, Virginia in 1820-1821, then continued his education at Ohio University and graduated in 1825.

On February 7, 1833 in Charleston he married Amacetta Laidley (1818-1892), and they had sons Lewis Summers (1844-1928) and George Laidley Summers (1848-1863).

== Career ==
Summers was admitted to the Virginia bar in 1827 and opened a law practice in Charleston.

In 1830, voters in Kanawha County elected Summers to the Virginia House of Delegates, where he served from 1830 to 1832 (when he was defeated by James H. Fry, whom he defeated two years later), and again in the part-time position from 1834 to 1836.

Later, in 1840, voters elected Summers as a Whig to the U.S. House of Representatives, where he represented what was then Virginia's 19th Congressional District. Summers served in the Twenty-Seventh and Twenty-Eighth Congresses, and despite the abolition of the 19th district after the 1840 census. He won re-election to the restructured 14th Congressional district, but was defeated for reelection in 1844 by Joseph Johnson.

Summers again represented Kanawha County as a delegate in the 1850 Virginia Constitutional Convention. However, his attempt to become Governor of Virginia failed in 1851, as he again lost to Joseph Johnson. The Virginia General Assembly, nonetheless elected Summers a circuit court judge for the Eighteenth Judicial Circuit (which covered several counties in the Kanawha Valley) and he served for six years, replacing slaveholder David McComas and being replaced by him after six years when he resigned and resumed his law practice for the final near decade of his life.

In 1861, Kanawha County voters again elected Summers to represent them, at the Virginia Secession Convention of 1861. He vehemently opposed Virginia's secession from the Union. In March 1861 he hoped, with associates, to call a border state convention in Nashville or Frankfort (sometimes called the "Guthrie Plan" after James Guthrie of Kentucky) to forestall the looming conflict. Instead, after he spoke at the Secession convention, former president John Tyler and University of Virginia professor James P. Holcombe spoke at length to refute his argument. After President Lincoln called for troops following the Battle of Fort Sumter and the convention voted for secession, Summers resigned and was replaced by Andrew Parks.

== Death and legacy ==
Summers died in Charleston on September 19, 1868. He is buried at Charleston's Spring Hill Cemetery

In 1871, the West Virginia Legislature honored Summers by forming Summers County from portions of Fayette, Greenbrier County, Mercer County, and Monroe County.

Party political offices
First	Whig nominee for Governor of Virginia; 1851	Succeeded by None
U.S. House of Representatives
Preceded by Andrew Beirne	Member of the U.S. House of Representatives from Virginia's 19th congressional district March 4, 1841 – March 3, 1843 (obsolete district)	Succeeded by CD abolished
Preceded by Henry A. Wise	Member of the U.S. House of Representatives from Virginia's 14th congressional district March 4, 1843 – March 3, 1845	Succeeded by Joseph Johnson
