= Charles S. Lewis =

American politician

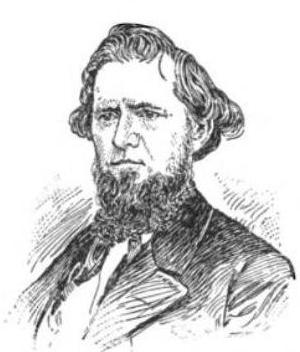
- Portrait of Charles S. Lewis

Member of the U.S. House of Representatives from Virginia's 11th district
- In office December 4, 1854 – March 3, 1855
- Preceded by: John F. Snodgrass
- Succeeded by: John S. Carlile

Member of the Virginia House of Delegates
- In office 1849–1852

Member of the West Virginia House of Delegates
- In office 1871

Personal details
- Born: February 26, 1821 Clarksburg, Virginia (now West Virginia), U.S.
- Died: January 22, 1878 (aged 56) Clarksburg, West Virginia, U.S.
- Education: Ohio University; Augusta College

Charles Swearinger Lewis (February 26, 1821 – January 22, 1878) was a U.S. representative from Virginia.

== Biography ==
Born in Clarksburg, Virginia (now West Virginia), Lewis attended local schools and Ohio University at Athens. He graduated from Augusta College in Kentucky in 1844. Lewis studied law and was admitted to the bar in 1846. He began the practice of law in Clarksburg, Virginia.

Lewis served as member of the Virginia House of Delegates from 1849 until 1852. He was elected as a Democratic candidate to the Thirty-third Congress to fill the vacancy caused by the death of John F. Snodgrass, serving from December 4, 1854, until March 3, 1855. He was an unsuccessful candidate for reelection in 1854 to the Thirty-fourth Congress.

After leaving Congress, Lewis resumed the practice of law in Clarksburg. He served as a delegate to the State constitutional convention in 1861, and served in the West Virginia House of Delegates in 1871. He was State superintendent of free schools and adjutant general of the State of West Virginia from 1871 to 1872. He resigned upon his election as judge of the second judicial circuit and served until his death.

Lewis died on January 22, 1878, in Clarksburg, West Virginia. He is interred in Odd Fellows Cemetery.

U.S. House of Representatives
| Preceded by John F. Snodgrass | Member of the U.S. House of Representatives from Virginia's 11th congressional district December 4, 1854 – March 3, 1855 | Succeeded by John S. Carlile |
