= 1851 Virginia gubernatorial election =

- December 8, 1851
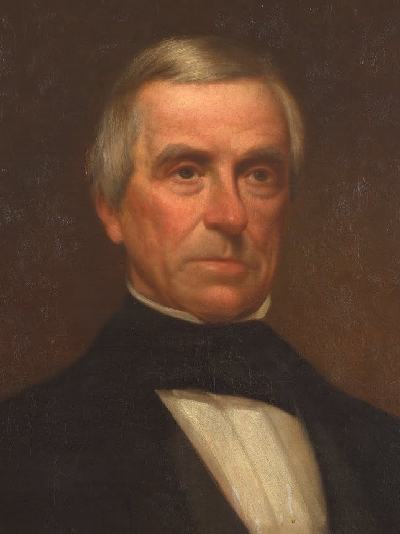

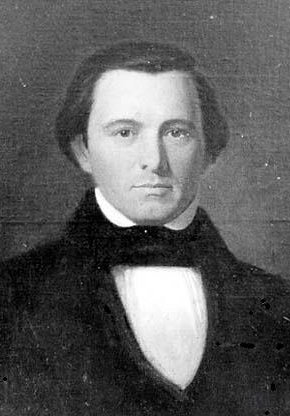
| Nominee | Joseph Johnson | George W. Summers |
| Party | Democratic | Whig |
| Popular vote | 67,074 | 59,476 |
| Percentage | 53.00% | 47.00% |
- County results Johnson: 50–60% 60–70% 70–80% 80–90% >90% Summers: 50–60% 60–70% 70–80% 80–90% Tie: 50% Unknown/No Votes
Governor before election
John B. Floyd
Democratic
Elected Governor
Joseph Johnson
Democratic

The 1851 Virginia gubernatorial election was held on December 8, 1851 to elect the governor of Virginia. It was the first gubernatorial election in Virginia in which the governor was elected by direct popular vote, instead of being selected by the state legislature. The change was brought about by the adoption of the Virginia Constitution of 1851.

== Results ==
Virginia gubernatorial election, 1851
| Party | Candidate | Votes | % |
|---|---|---|---|
| Democratic | Joseph Johnson | 67,074 | 53.00% |
| Whig | George W. Summers | 59,476 | 47.00% |
| Total votes | | 126,550 | 100.00% |
| Democratic hold | | | |
