= Virginia's 16th congressional district =

1793–1843 US congressional district

Coordinates: 38°40′N 79°0′W

- Obsolete district
- Created: 1793
- Eliminated: 1843
- Years active: 1793–1843

Virginia's 16th congressional district is an obsolete congressional district. It was eliminated in 1843 after the 1840 U.S. census. Its last congressman was William A. Harris.

== List of members representing the district ==
Representative	Party	Term	Cong ress	Electoral history
District established March 4, 1793
Anthony New (Gloucester County)	Anti-Administration	March 4, 1793 – March 3, 1795	3rd 4th 5th 6th 7th	Elected in 1793. Re-elected in 1795. Re-elected in 1797. Re-elected in 1799. Re-elected in 1801. Redistricted to the 11th district.
Anthony New (Gloucester County)	Democratic-Republican	March 4, 1795 – March 3, 1803	3rd 4th 5th 6th 7th	Elected in 1793. Re-elected in 1795. Re-elected in 1797. Re-elected in 1799. Re-elected in 1801. Redistricted to the 11th district.
John W. Eppes (Charles City)	Democratic-Republican	March 4, 1803 – March 3, 1811	8th 9th 10th 11th	Elected in 1803. Re-elected in 1805. Re-elected in 1807. Re-elected in 1809. Moved to the 15th district and lost re-election.
James Pleasants (Goochland)	Democratic-Republican	March 4, 1811 – March 3, 1813	12th	Elected in 1811. Redistricted to the 17th district.
John W. Eppes (Charles City)	Democratic-Republican	March 4, 1813 – March 3, 1815	13th	Elected in 1813. Lost re-election.
John Randolph (Charlotte)	Democratic-Republican	March 4, 1815 – March 3, 1817	14th	Elected in 1815. Retired.
Archibald Austin (Buckingham)	Democratic-Republican	March 4, 1817 – March 3, 1819	15th	Elected in 1817. Retired.
John Randolph (Charlotte)	Democratic-Republican	March 4, 1819 – March 3, 1823	16th 17th	Elected in 1819. Re-elected in 1821. Redistricted to the 5th district.
James Stephenson (Martinsburg)	Crawford Federalist	March 4, 1823 – March 3, 1825	18th	Redistricted from the 2nd district and re-elected in 1823. Retired.
William Armstrong (Romney)	Anti-Jacksonian	March 4, 1825 – March 3, 1833	19th 20th 21st 22nd	Elected in 1825. Re-elected in 1827. Re-elected in 1829. Re-elected in 1831. Retired.
James M. H. Beale (Mount Jackson)	Jacksonian	March 4, 1833 – March 3, 1837	23rd 24th	Elected in 1833. Re-elected in 1835. Retired.
Isaac S. Pennybacker (Harrisonburg)	Democratic	March 4, 1837 – March 3, 1839	25th	Elected in 1837. Appt. District Court judge.
Green B. Samuels (Woodstock)	Democratic	March 4, 1839 – March 3, 1841	26th	Elected in 1839. Retired.
William A. Harris (Luray)	Democratic	March 4, 1841 – March 3, 1843	27th	Elected in 1841. Retired.
District dissolved March 4, 1843
