= Robert A. Thompson =

American politician (1805–1876)

Member of the U.S. House of Representatives from Virginia's 14th district
- In office March 4, 1847 – March 3, 1849
- Preceded by: Joseph Johnson
- Succeeded by: James M. H. Beale

Member of the Virginia Senate
- In office 1839–1846

Personal details
- Born: Robert Augustine Thompson; February 14, 1805 near Culpeper, Virginia, U.S.
- Died: August 31, 1876 (aged 71) San Francisco, California, U.S.
- Resting place: Cypress Lawn Memorial Park, Colma, California, U.S.
- Party: Democratic
- Children: Thomas
- Education: University of Virginia
- Occupation: Politician, lawyer

Robert Augustine Thompson (February 14, 1805 – August 31, 1876) was a U.S. representative from Virginia and father of Thomas Larkin Thompson, who became a representative from California.

== Biography ==
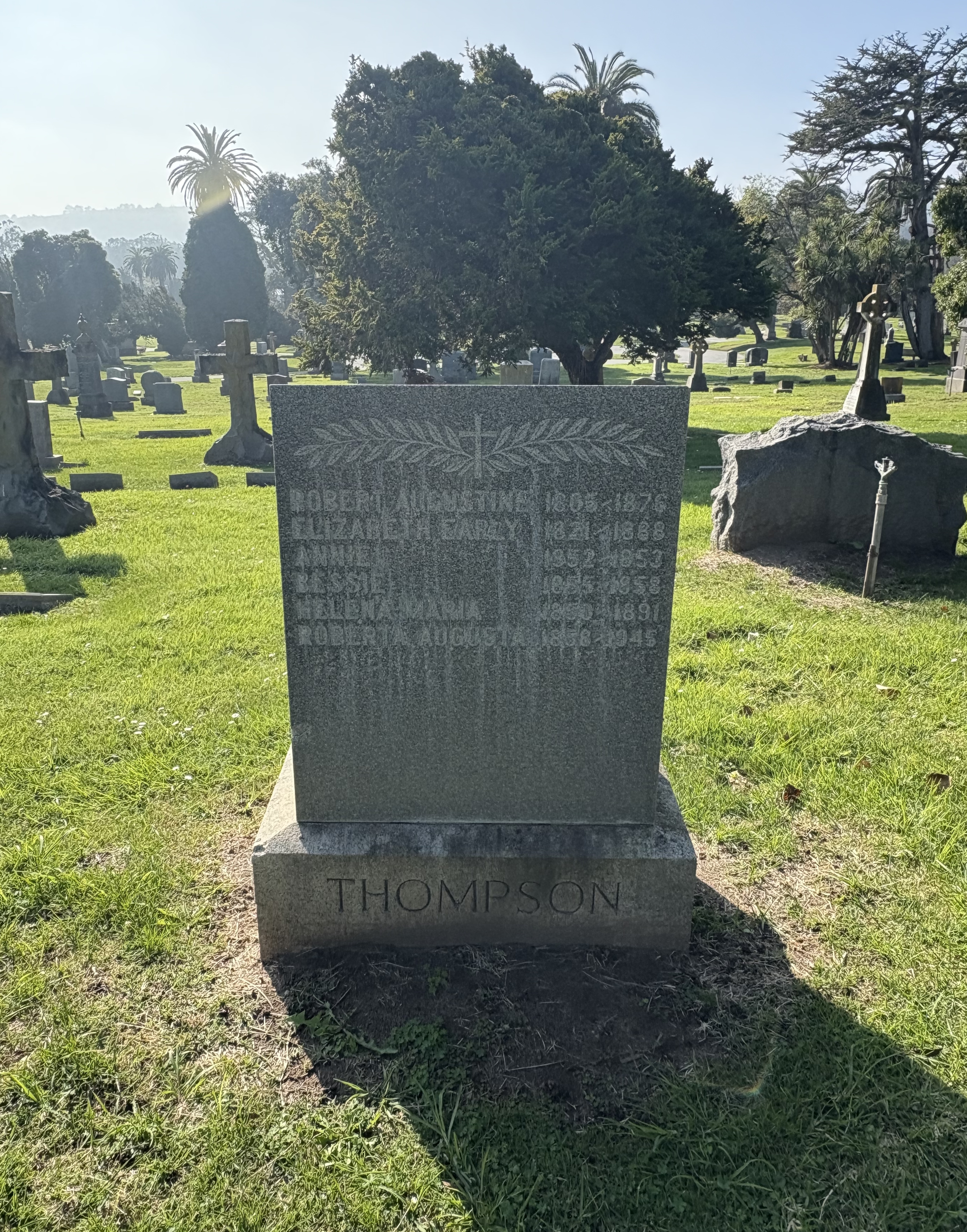
Thompson's grave at Cypress Lawn Memorial Park

Born near Culpeper Court House, Virginia, in 1805, Robert A. Thompson attended a private school at Gallipolis, Ohio, and the University of Virginia at Charlottesville, Virginia, where he studied law. He was admitted to the bar in 1826 and commenced practice in Charleston, Virginia (now West Virginia). Thompson served as a member of the Virginia Senate from 1839–1846.

Thompson was elected as a Democrat to the Thirtieth Congress (March 4, 1847 – March 3, 1849); he declined to be a candidate for reelection.

In 1852 he served as a delegate to the Democratic National Convention, and as a member of the board of visitors of his alma mater, the University of Virginia.

Thompson moved to San Francisco, California, in 1853. That same year, he was appointed to a commission to settle private land claims in his adopted state. In 1870, he was appointed by the Governor as a reporter of the California Supreme Court, and also joined the justices' court of San Francisco; he served on that court until his death in San Francisco in 1876.

He was interred in Laurel Hill Cemetery in San Francisco, but upon the dissolution of that cemetery (between 1939 and 1941) he was re-interred at Cypress Lawn Memorial Park in Colma, San Mateo County, California.

Thompson's son, Thomas Larkin Thompson, settled in Sonoma County, north of San Francisco. He was elected to Congress in 1886 from the 1st Congressional District, which then covered much of northern California, but was defeated for re-election in 1888.

== Sources ==
- United States Congress. "Robert A. Thompson (id: T000215)". Biographical Directory of the United States Congress.

U.S. House of Representatives
| Preceded by Joseph Johnson | Member of the U.S. House of Representatives from Virginia's 14th congressional district March 4, 1847–March 3, 1849 | Succeeded by James M. H. Beale |
