= Governor Joseph Johnson House =

Historic house in West Virginia, United States

- U.S. National Register of Historic Places
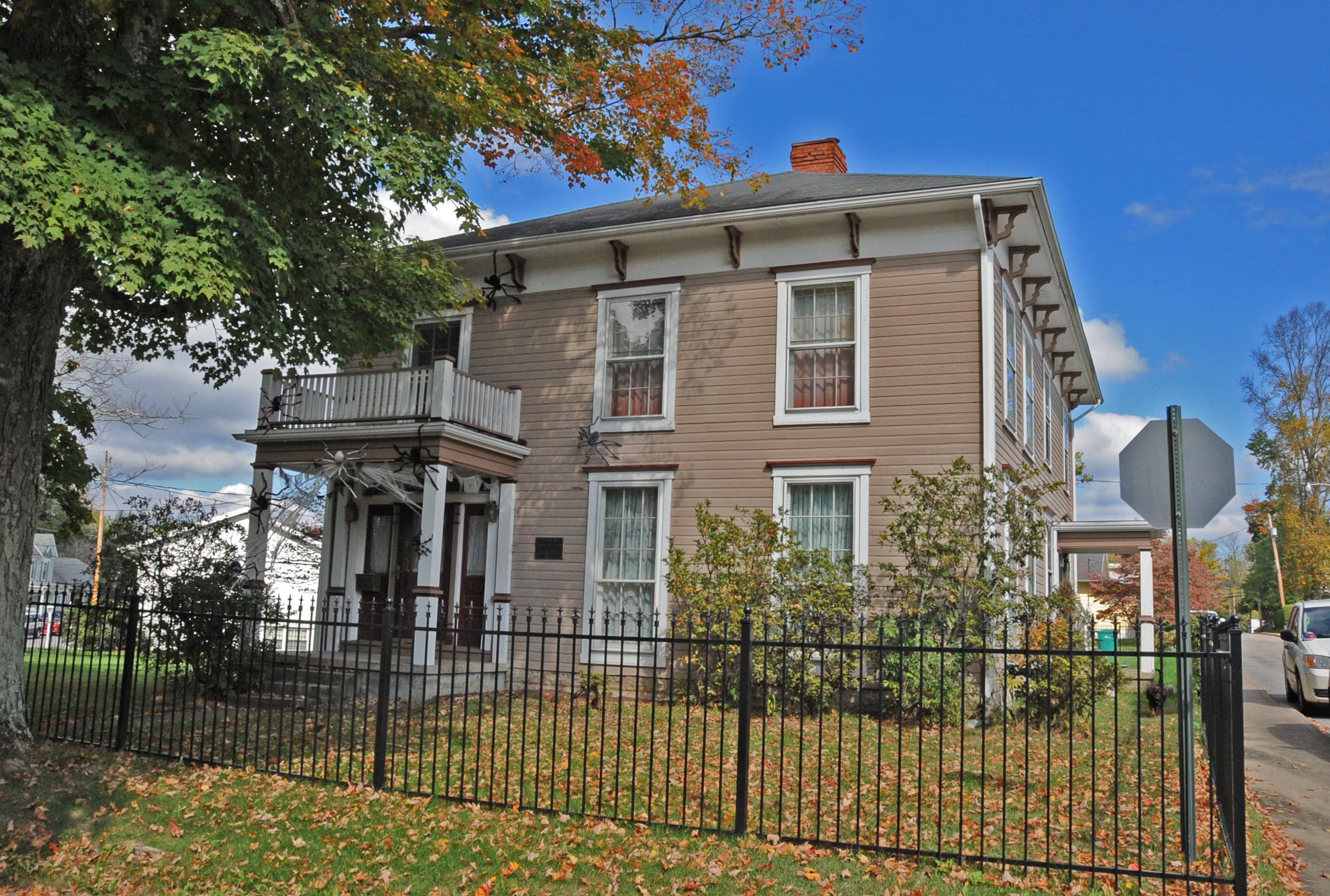

- Location within West Virginia Location within the United States
- Location: 424 Oakdale Ave., Bridgeport, West Virginia
- Coordinates: 39°17′7″N 80°15′32″W
- Built: 1818
- Architectural style: Italianate
- NRHP reference No.: 87000490
- Added to NRHP: March 19, 1987

The Governor Joseph Johnson House, also known as Oakdale, is located on a half-acre lot that is bordered on the north by Johnson Avenue (named for the governor), on the west by Oakdale Avenue (named for the house), and on the south by Maple Street, in the town of Bridgeport, West Virginia. The house was constructed in 1818 for then Assemblyman Joseph Johnson. The structure is significant because it was the home of the only governor of Virginia from the Trans-Alleghany region and one of antebellum Western, now West Virginia's most significant public figures.

== Architecture ==
Oakdale was originally a two-story frame residence. It was remodeled in about 1840 in the form of an Italianate architecture residence. Still two stories, it is basically a rectangular wood residence, with clapboard siding. There is a central corbelled chimney dating from 1818 period, as well as a middle-of-bay rear chimney that is part of the 1840 remodel. The home itself rests on a cut-stone foundation, in excellent condition; obviously the work of master stonemasons of the period.
