= Tim Lindsey =

American football player (born 1983)

Profile
- Position: Long snapper

Personal information
- Born: September 15, 1983 (age 43); Bridgeport, West Virginia
- Listed height: 6 ft 5 in (1.96 m)
- Listed weight: 260 lb (118 kg)

Career information
- College: West Virginia
- NFL draft: 2007: undrafted

Career history
- Washington Redskins (2007)*; Atlanta Falcons (2007)*; Seattle Seahawks (2008); Hartford Colonials (2010)
- * Offseason or practice squad member only

Tim Lindsey (born September 15, 1983) is a former football long snapper from West Virginia, who is currently a fitness trainer. Lindsey played college football at West Virginia University.

== College ==
At WVU he was the best long snapper in the Big East and a stalwart for the Mountaineer special teams. From 2003 to 2007 he was on Athletic Director's academic honor roll. In 2006, he was awarded a full athletic scholarship. In 2006 and 2007 he was on the All-Big East Academic Team. He was a team leader in the weight room, setting position lifting records and he was voted one of the four permanent team captains for 2007 at the Gator Bowl.

== Football career ==
In 2007, he attended the Redskins mini-camp and later signed as an undrafted free agent by the Atlanta Falcons. In 2008 Lindsey was signed by the Seattle Seahawks (released August 28, 2008) and was outstanding in the pre-season. He had nine perfect snaps including the game-winning field goal in overtime against the Bears in Week 2 and played two pre-season games. In 2010, Lindsey was signed by the UFL Hartford Colonials and participated in the team's early mini-camp. He was later released in favor of Jared Retkofsky, who had snapped the previous year for the franchise (New York Sentinels). Retkofsky had just been released by the Pittsburgh Steelers (June 9, 2010) with whom he played nine games in the 2009 NFL season.

== Awards ==
In 2006, he received the Coaches Contribution Award. That year, he was also the winner of the Tom Nickolich Memorial Award for outstanding achievement by a walk-on in the Mountaineer football program. In 2007, he received the Ira E. Rodgers Award presented to the player who has shown high leadership and academic qualities as well as football performance.
