= George Hay Lee =

American judge and politician

Member of the Virginia House of Delegates from Harrison County
- In office 1839–1841
- Preceded by: Edward J. Armstrong
- Succeeded by: Jessee Flowers

Judge Virginia Court of Appeals
- In office July 1, 1852 – April 1861
- Preceded by: Briscoe Baldwin
- Succeeded by: Alexander Rives

Personal details
- Born: 1807 Winchester, Frederick County, Virginia, US
- Died: November 20, 1873 (aged 65–66) Clarksburg, Harrison County, West Virginia, West Virginia US
- Resting place: private cemetery Clarksburg, West Virginia
- Party: Republican
- Education: University of Virginia
- Profession: Politician, lawyer, judge

George Hay Lee (1807 – November 20, 1873) was a Virginia lawyer and politician who served on the Virginia Court of Appeals from 1852 until Virginia declared secession in 1861.

== Early and family life ==
Born in Winchester, Virginia in 1807 to one of the First Families of Virginia. Lee attended the University of Virginia in 1827-28 and studied law under Judge Henry St. George Tucker at Winchester Law School in Winchester. He married twice and had six children, three daughters and three sons.

== Career ==
Lee crossed the Appalachian mountains and began his legal practice in Clarksburg, West Virginia, the seat of what was then Harrison County, Virginia, in 1831. He formed a joint practice with celebrated trial attorney Mathew Edmiston, of Weston in Lewis County.

Harrison County judges selected Lee as the Commonwealth Attorney (prosecutor), and he also once served as assistant U.S. Attorney for the Western District of Virginia, and later as the U.S. Attorney for the Western District. In 1839 Harrison county voters elected and re-elected Lee as one of the county's delegates to the Virginia House of Delegates. In 1840, Lee owned three enslaved people, two women younger than 23 and one man, but appears absent from the slave schedules associates with the 1850 and 1860 federal censuses. In 1852, Virginia legislators elected Lee to the Court of Appeals, judge Briscoe Baldwin of Staunton having died in office. As the American Civil War began and Virginia voted to secede, Judge Lee did not sit on the court after the April 1861 term when the state of West Virginia was formed as a result of the northwestern counties of Virginia refusing to join the remainder of the state in joining the Confederacy. The separation of West Virginia was recognized in 1866, and another western Virginian elected to the seat.

== Death and legacy ==
Lee died at his home in Clarksburg, West Virginia on November 20, 1873.
