= Winchester Law School =

Former law school in Winchester, VA

Coordinates: 39°10′58.6″N 78°9′52.9″W

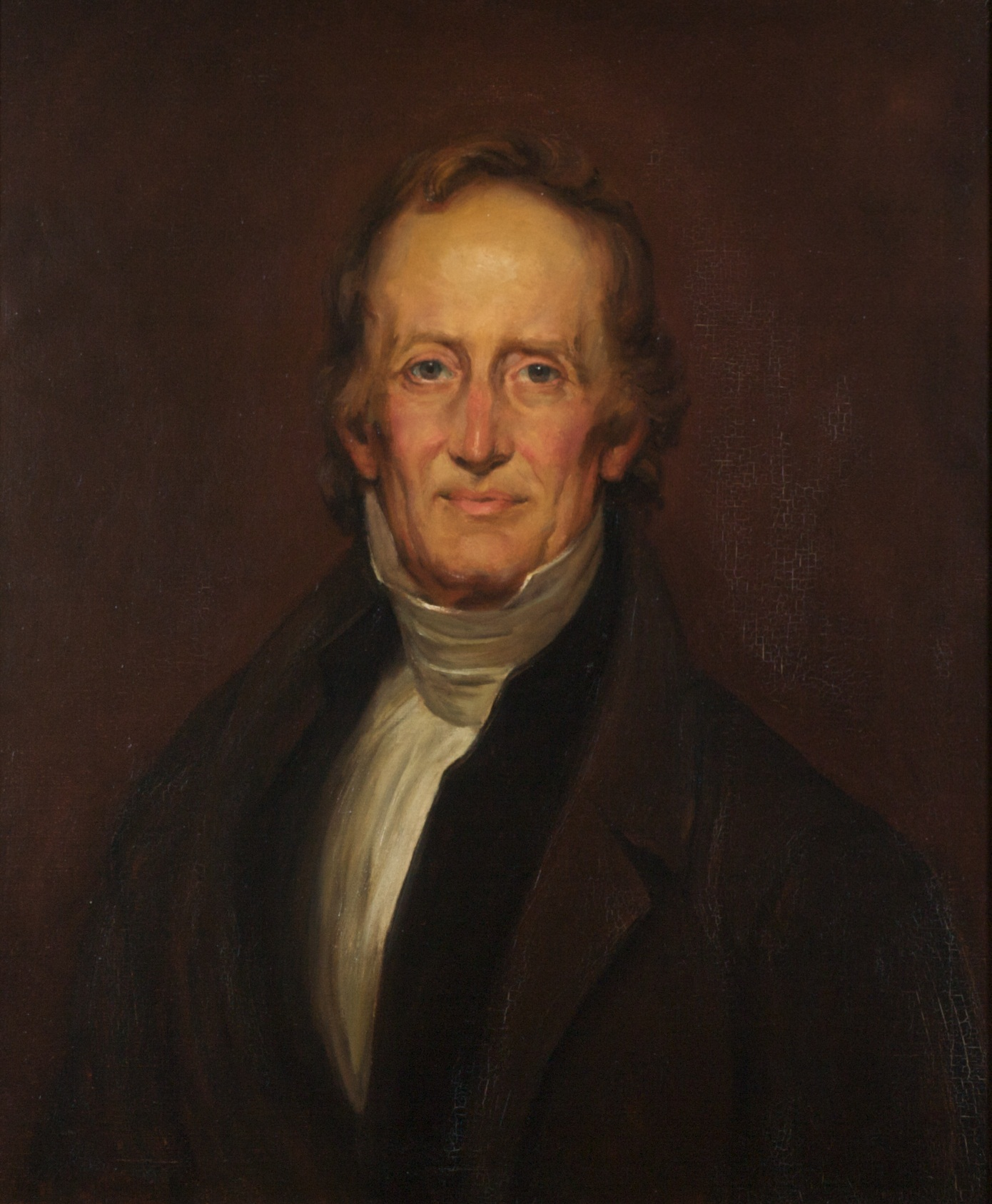
Henry St. George Tucker Sr., founder and operator of the Winchester Law School.

Winchester Law School was a privately run institution for legal education in Winchester, Virginia. Operated by Chancellor Henry St. George Tucker Sr., it operated from 1824 to 1831. Tucker closed it after being elected to the state Court of Appeals, because he had to move to Richmond, the capital.

== History ==
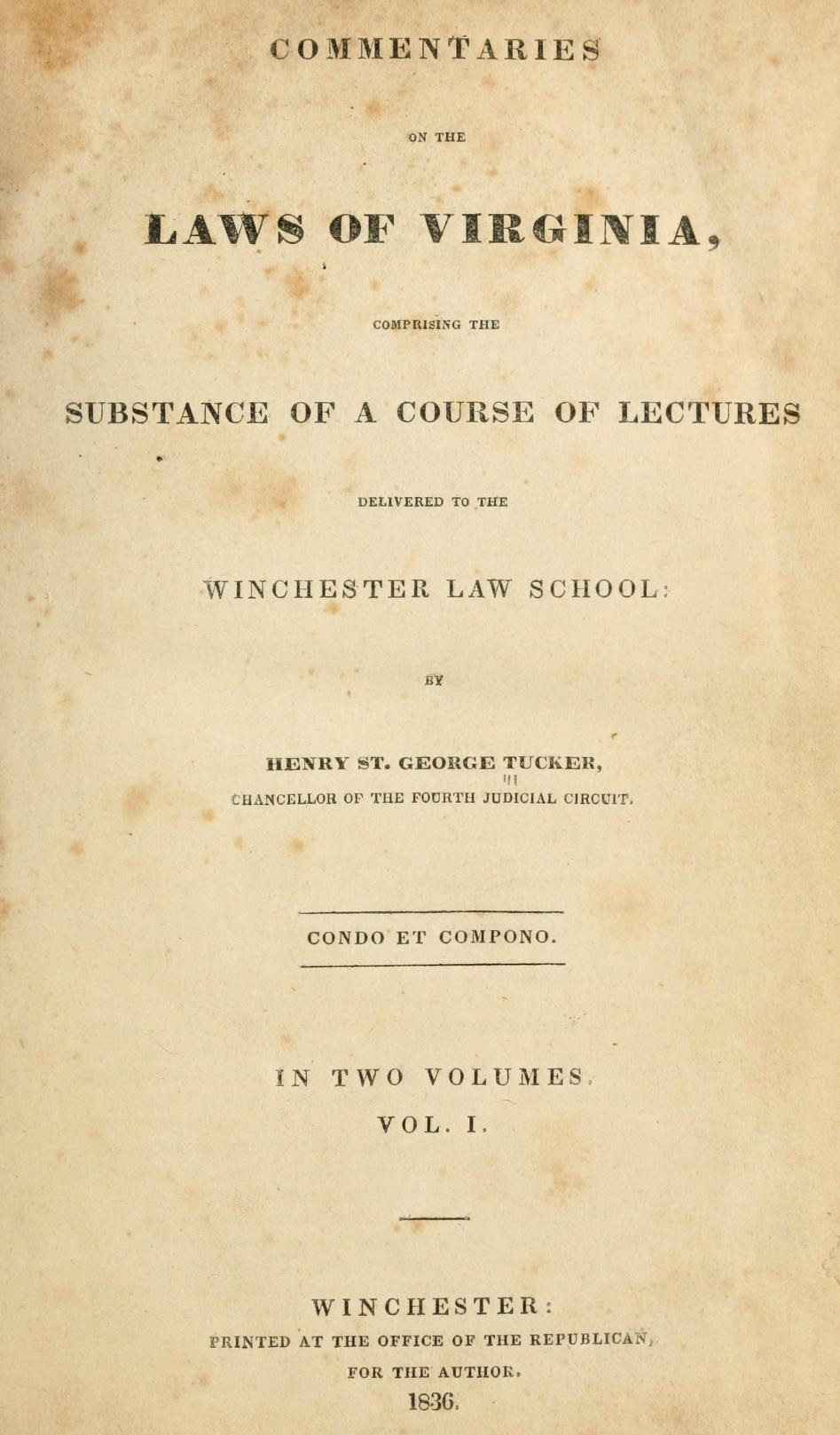
Title page of Volume 1 of Henry St. George Tucker's "Commentaries on the Laws of Virginia". This work includes lectures he delivered while operating the Winchester Law School.

In 1824 Henry Tucker was named Chancellor of the Equity Court of the Fourth District, with jurisdiction in Clarksburg and Winchester. Since he had left the Virginia State Senate and a lucrative law practice to accept the judicial appointment, he needed to generate additional income.

Because he had previously worked as a law professor, Tucker decided to start a law school using a building at what is now 37 South Cameron Street in Winchester.

Using his father St. George Tucker's copies of Blackstone's Commentaries as the basis for his instruction, Henry Tucker lectured three days each week and gave his students regular quizzes to test their knowledge. In addition, he prepared, edited and published Tucker's Notes on Blackstone's Commentaries for the Use of Students. Tucker's Commentaries provided the current state and federal law on each point covered by Blackstone, and was widely used because it focused on United States common law rather than English legal and political theory.

The Winchester Law School was a success, largely because of Tucker's favorable reputation as an attorney and law professor. He had 11 students in the 1824 to 1825 session, and the student body steadily increased until he had more than 30 students each term.

== Closing ==
In 1831 Tucker was elected to the Virginia Court of Appeals. This position required him to relocate to Richmond and to close the Winchester Law School.

== Notable alumni ==
- John White Brockenbrough, federal judge and founder of the Washington and Lee University School of Law
- William B. Campbell, member of the United States House of Representatives and Governor of Tennessee
- John R. Chambliss Sr., wealthy Virginia attorney, planter and member of the Confederate Congress
- Robert M. T. Hunter, Speaker of the House, United States Senator from Virginia and Confederate States Secretary of State
- William L. Goggin, member of the United States House of Representatives from Virginia
- Zaccheus Collins Lee, attorney and judge in Maryland
- Isaac S. Pennybacker, United States Senator from Virginia
- Henry A. Wise, 33rd Governor of Virginia

== See also ==
- List of defunct law schools in the United States
- Winchester Medical College
