= John S. Carlile =

American politician (1817–1878)

John Snyder Carlile
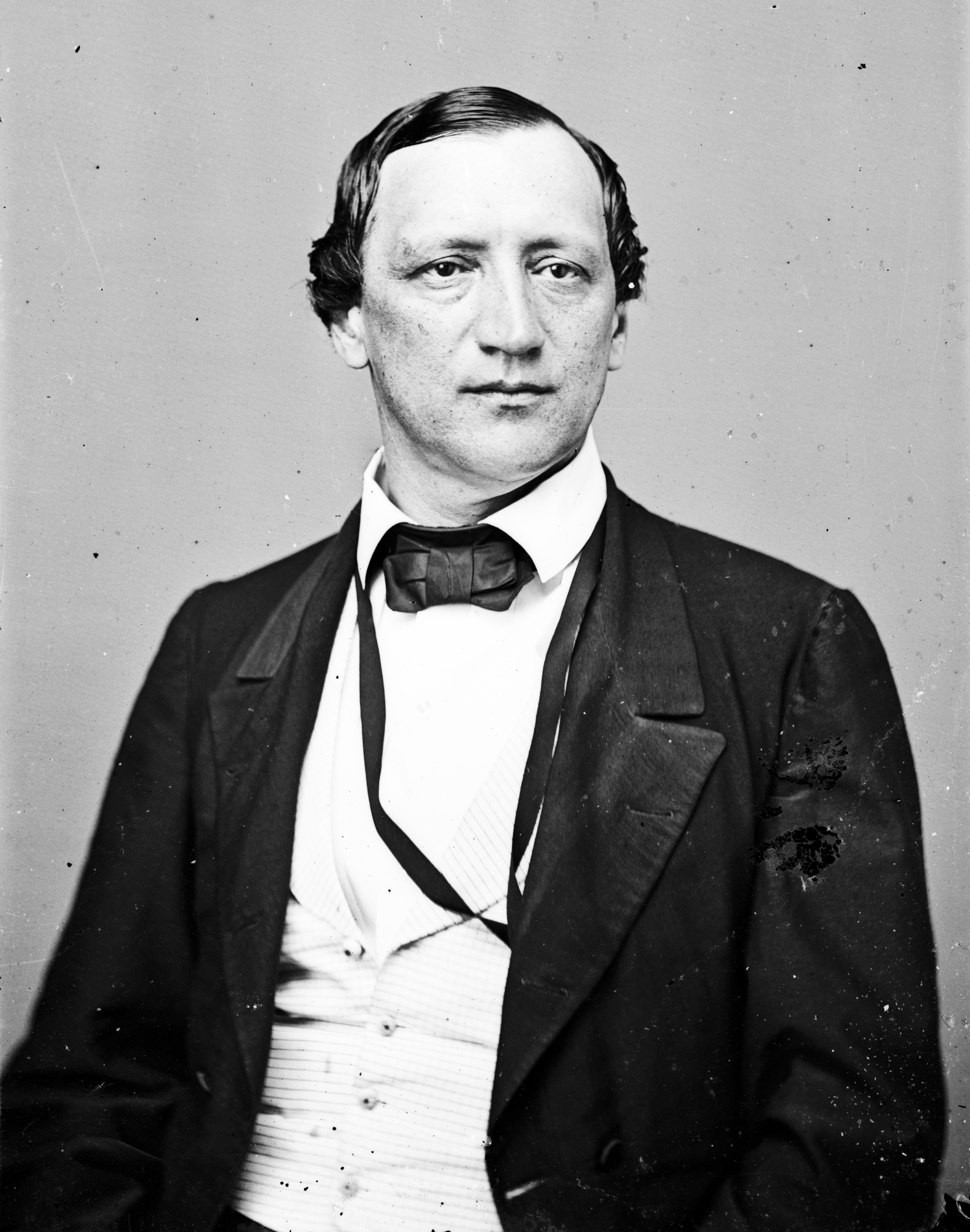

United States Senator from Virginia
- In office July 9, 1861 – March 4, 1865
- Preceded by: Robert M. T. Hunter
- Succeeded by: John W. Johnston

Member of the U.S. House of Representatives from Virginia's 11th district
- In office March 4, 1855 – March 3, 1857
- Preceded by: Charles S. Lewis
- Succeeded by: Albert G. Jenkins
- In office March 4, 1861 – July 9, 1861
- Preceded by: Albert G. Jenkins
- Succeeded by: Jacob B. Blair

Member of the Virginia Senate
- In office 1847–1851

Personal details
- Born: December 16, 1817 Winchester, Virginia, U.S.
- Died: October 24, 1878 (aged 60) Clarksburg, West Virginia, U.S.
- Party: Union
- Spouse: Mary Ellen Gittings
- Profession: Lawyer, politician

John Snyder Carlile (December 16, 1817 – October 24, 1878) was an American merchant, lawyer, slaveowner and politician, including a United States senator. A strong supporter of the Union cause during the American Civil War, he represented the loyalist faction of Virginia, which was eventually separated into two distinct states.

== Biography ==
Carlile was born in Winchester, Virginia. He was educated by his mother until he was fourteen years old, when he became salesman in a store, and at the age of seventeen went into business on his own account. He then studied law, was admitted to the bar in 1840, and began practice in Beverly. Entering politics, he joined the Democratic Party. He was selected as a delegate to the Virginia state constitutional convention in 1850. Carlile served in the Virginia State Senate from 1847 to 1851. He joined the new Know Nothing political movement in 1854 and represented Virginia's 11th District in the United States House for one term.

Carlile was a delegate from Harrison County to the Virginia secession convention in 1861, voting no on the controversial resolution. He was a leader in the anti-secession movement, and was prominent in the Wheeling Convention of June 1861. On June 13, 1861, at the first session of the Second Wheeling Convention, Carlile authored "A Declaration of the People of Virginia." The document pronounced Virginia's Ordinance of Secession illegal because the convention at which it had been drafted had been convened by the General Assembly, not by a referendum. It also called for the reorganization of the government of Virginia, arguing that due to Virginia's decision to secede from the United States, all state government offices had been vacated. The pro-Union Restored Government of Virginia was quickly recognized by President Abraham Lincoln and Congress as the legitimate government of the entire Commonwealth of Virginia, with Wheeling as its provisional capital. He was averse, however, to the formation of a new state out of the bulk of the pro-Union territory of Virginia—what became West Virginia.

Carlile was again chosen to Congress in 1861 by the Union Party, but kept his seat in the House of Representatives only from July 4 through July 13, when he was elected as one of two United States Senators representing the Restored Government. He served until 1865. In the Senate, he was uniformly in favor of a strict construction of the Constitution, opposing all measures recognizing that there existed a rebellion of states instead of individuals, and denying the right of Congress to interfere in any way with the slaves (Carlile being a slaveowner himself). He frequently met with Lincoln to try to garner his support for his causes.

Following the war, Carlile retired from politics and returned home to resume his law practice. He died in Clarksburg, West Virginia, and was buried in the Odd Fellows Cemetery in Clarksburg.

== References and links ==
- United States Congress. "John S. Carlile (id: C000150)". Biographical Directory of the United States Congress.
- John S. Carlile in Encyclopedia Virginia
- Appleton's Cyclopedia of American Biography, edited by James Grant Wilson and John Fiske. Six volumes, New York: D. Appleton and Company, 1887–1889.

U.S. House of Representatives
Preceded by Charles S. Lewis	Member of the U.S. House of Representatives from Virginia's 11th congressional district March 4, 1855 – March 4, 1857	Succeeded by Albert G. Jenkins
Preceded by Albert G. Jenkins	Member of the U.S. House of Representatives from Virginia's 11th congressional district March 4, 1861 – July 9, 1861	Succeeded by Jacob B. Blair
U.S. Senate
Preceded by Robert M. T. Hunter	U.S. senator (Class 2) from Virginia; July 9, 1861 – March 4, 1865; Served alongside: Waitman T. Willey, Lemuel J. Bowden	Succeeded by John W. Johnston
