= John F. Snodgrass =

American politician (1804–1854)

John Fryall Snodgrass
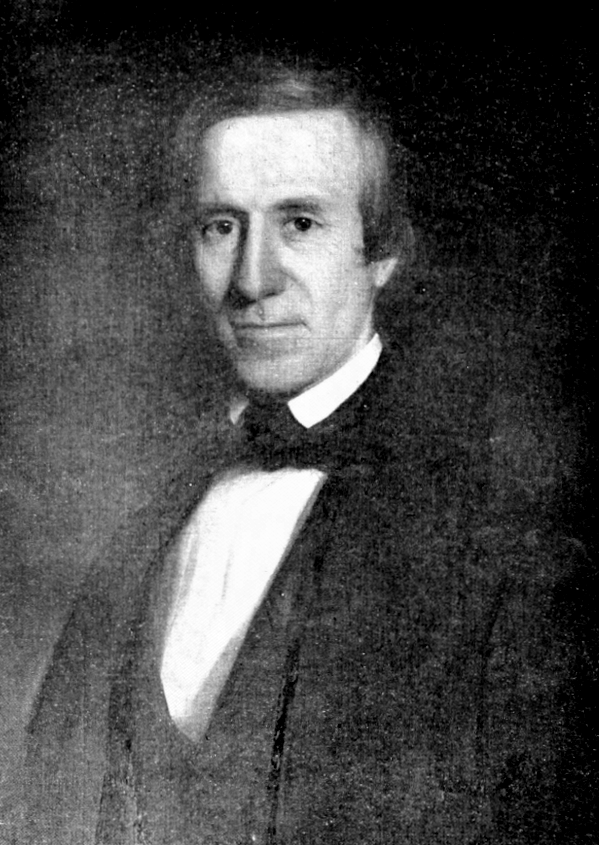

Member of the U.S. House of Representatives from Virginia's 11th district
- In office March 4, 1853 – June 5, 1854
- Preceded by: John Letcher
- Succeeded by: Charles S. Lewis

Personal details
- Born: March 2, 1804 Berkeley County, Virginia, U.S.
- Died: June 5, 1854 (aged 50) Parkersburg, Virginia, U.S.
- Resting place: Riverview Cemetery, Parkersburg, Virginia, U.S.
- Party: Democratic

John Fryall Snodgrass (March 2, 1804 – June 5, 1854) was a U.S. representative from Virginia.

== Biography ==
Snodgrass was born in Berkeley County, Virginia (now West Virginia) to William Snodgrass and Ann Fryatt Snodgrass. He completed preparatory studies, studied law and was admitted to the bar in 1843. He began the practice of law in Parkersburg, Virginia. Snodgrass served as delegate to the Virginia Constitutional Convention of 1850.

Snodgrass was elected as a Democrat to the Thirty-third Congress and served from March 4, 1853, until his death in Parkersburg (now West Virginia) on June 5, 1854.

== Personal life ==
Snodgrass was married to Louisa Kinnaird Snodgrass and they had three children. After Louisa's death, he married Virginia Quarrier and they had one child Sarah Virginia Snodgrass.

== See also ==
- List of members of the United States Congress who died in office (1790–1899)

U.S. House of Representatives
| Preceded by John Letcher | Member of the U.S. House of Representatives from Virginia's 11th congressional district March 4, 1853 – June 5, 1854 | Succeeded by Charles S. Lewis |
