= Bridgeport, Virginia =

Unincorporated community in Virginia, United States

Coordinates: 37°42′36″N 78°20′02″W

Bridgeport is an unincorporated community in Buckingham County, in the U.S. state of Virginia.
