= 1834–35 United States House of Representatives elections =

House elections for the 24th U.S. Congress

- July 7, 1834 – November 5, 1835 (Note: Excludes states admitted during the 24th Congress.)

All 242 (Note: Includes late elections.) seats in the United States House of Representatives 122 seats needed for a majority
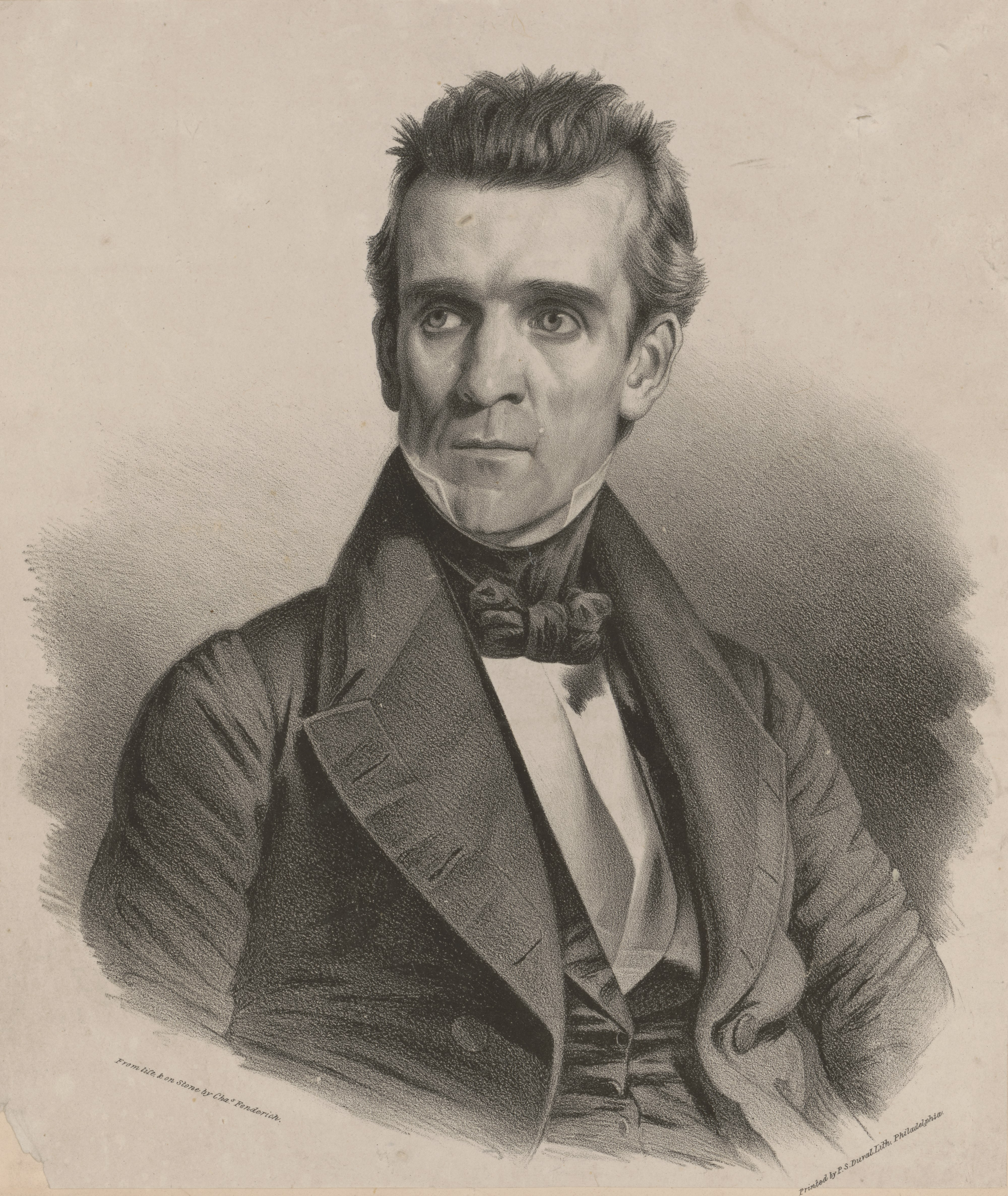

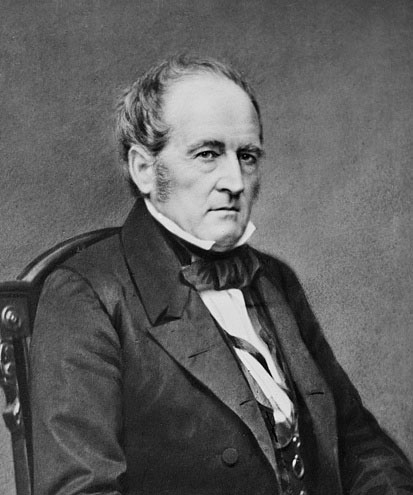
| | Majority party | Minority party |
|---|---|---|
| Leader | James K. Polk | John Bell |
| Party | Jacksonian | National Republican |
| Leader's seat | Tennessee 9th | Tennessee 7th |
| Last election | 143 seats | 63 seats |
| Seats won | 143 (Note: Includes 2 seats won by Unionist candidates in South Carolina) | 75 |
| Seat change | Steady | ▲12 |
| Popular vote | 782,913 (Note: Includes 13,057 votes for Unionist candidates in South Carolina) | 687,630 |
| Percentage | 49.51% | 43.48% |
| Swing | ▼4.44 pp | ▲18.63 pp |
| | Third party | Fourth party |
| Leader | John Quincy Adams |
| Party | Anti-Masonic | Nullifier |
| Leader's seat | Massachusetts 12th |
| Last election | 25 seats | 9 seats |
| Seats won | 16 | 8 (Note: Seven were elected in South Carolina under "Southern Rights" label and one elected in North Carolina as a "States Rights Whig.") |
| Seat change | ▼9 | ▼1 |
| Popular vote | 47,279 | 19,150 |
| Percentage | 2.99% | 1.21% |
| Swing | ▼11.79 pp | ▲0.12 pp |
| | Fifth party |
| Party | Independent |
| Last election | 0 seats |
| Seats won | 1 (Note: William Henry Ashley, of Missouri was elected as an independent.) |
| Seat change | ▲1 |
| Popular vote | 15,674 |
| Percentage | 0.99% |
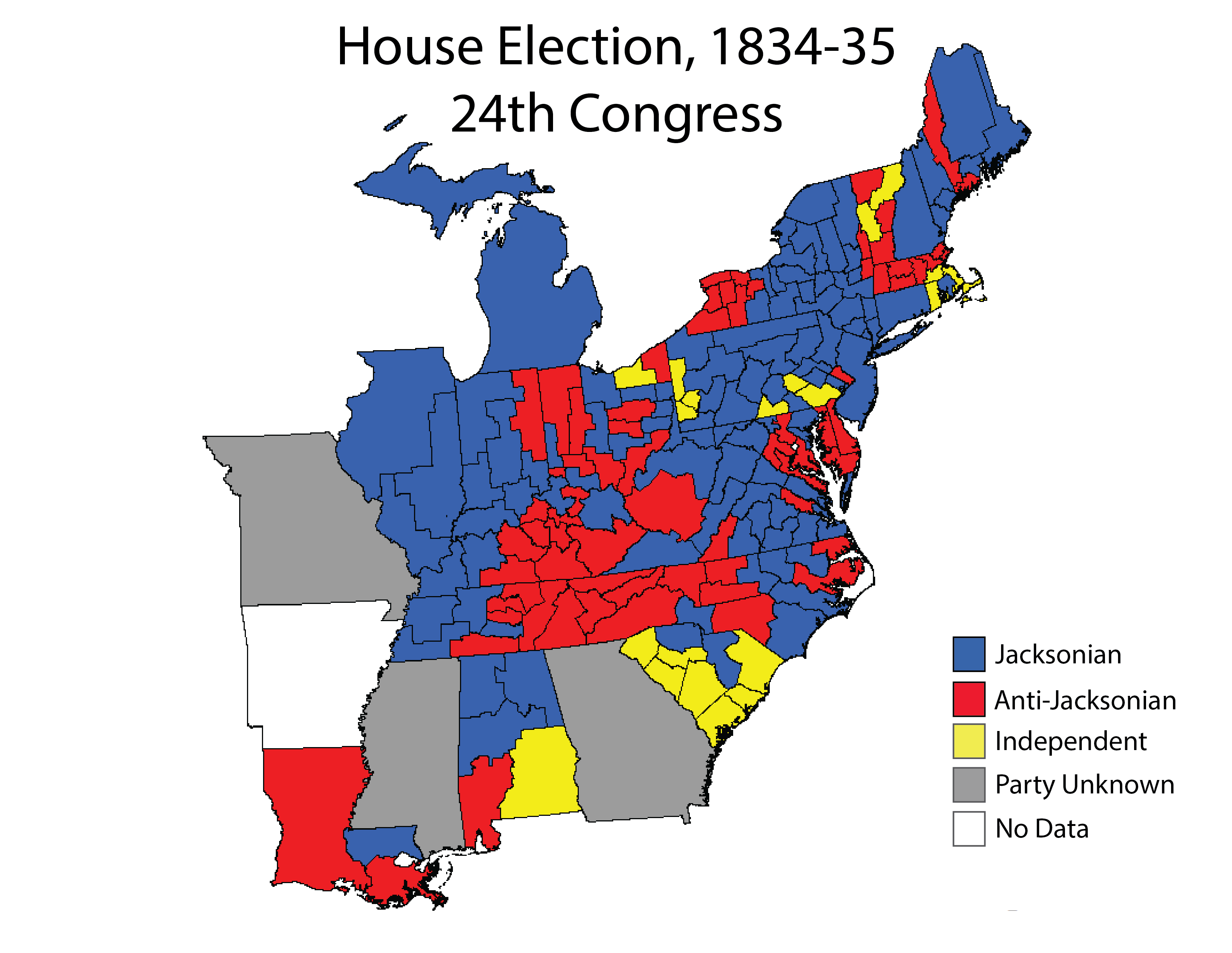
Speaker before election
John Bell
Jacksonian
Elected Speaker
James K. Polk
Jacksonian

The 1834–35 United States House of Representatives elections were held on various dates in various states between July 7, 1834, and November 5, 1835. Each state set its own date for its elections to the House of Representatives before the first session of the 24th United States Congress convened on December 7, 1835. They were held during President Andrew Jackson's second term. Elections were held for 240 seats that represented 24 states, as well as the at-large-district seat for the pending new U.S. state of Michigan.

Jacksonians benefitted from the president's continued popularity and the tight party organization of the nascent Democratic Party to win a large majority of House seats for the new Congress. Their primary opponents, the National Republicans, were coalescing and unifying as the Whig Party, reducing the influence of single-issue parties, the Anti-Masonic Party (an anti-Masonry movement) and the Nullifier Party (a John C. Calhoun-led states' rights party that supported South Carolina during the Nullification Crisis in 1832 and 1833). The Whig Party evolved from the National Republican Party and these minor parties. It appealed to diverse opponents of Jackson, including voters who perceived him as autocratic and brash, voters supporting greater spending and development on institutions and infrastructure, anti-Masons, and former Federalists. As the balance of power in the House remained unchanged, with Jacksonians holding 142 seats, this was the smallest loss by a President's party in the House as a result of the so-called six-year itch.

When the House convened in December 1835, future president James K. Polk, a staunch Jacksonian, was elected speaker. He defeated the incumbent speaker, John Bell, a Jacksonian who had split with the president on the national bank and other issues. Bell subsequently aligned himself with the National Republicans in the 24th Congress.

== Election summary ==
Michigan was admitted during this Congress, adding 1 seat. (Note: The House refused to admit the member from Michigan due to the state's Toledo War conflict with Ohio, so he was seated only as a non-voting delegate until January 27, 1837.)

↓
| 75 | 16 | 8 | 142 |
| National Republican | Anti-Masonic | N | Jacksonian |

| State | Type | Date | Total seats | National Republican | | Anti-Masonic | | Jacksonian | | Nullifier | |
| State | Type | Date | Total seats | Seats | Change | Seats | Change | Seats | Change | Seats | Change |
|---|---|---|---|---|---|---|---|---|---|---|---|
| Delaware | At-large | November 11, 1834 | 1 | 1 | Steady | 0 | Steady | 0 | Steady | 0 | Steady |
| Georgia | At-large | October 6, 1834 | 9 | 0 | Steady | 0 | Steady | 9 | Steady | 0 | Steady |
| Illinois | Districts | August 4, 1834 | 3 | 0 | Steady | 0 | Steady | 3 | Steady | 0 | Steady |
| Louisiana | Districts | July 7–9, 1834 | 3 | 2 | Steady | 0 | Steady | 1 | Steady | 0 | Steady |
| Maine | Districts | September 8, 1834 | 8 | 2 | ▲1 | 0 | Steady | 6 | ▼1 | 0 | Steady |
| Massachusetts | Districts | November 10, 1834 | 12 | 8 | ▼1 | 3 | ▲1 | 1 | Steady | 0 | Steady |
| New Jersey | At-large | October 14, 1834 | 6 | 0 | Steady | 0 | Steady | 6 | Steady | 0 | Steady |
| New York | Districts | November 3–5, 1834 | 40 | 9 | ▲9 | 0 | ▼8 | 31 | ▼1 | 0 | Steady |
| Ohio | Districts | October 14, 1834 | 19 | 9 | ▲3 | 1 | ▼1 | 9 | ▼2 | 0 | Steady |
| Pennsylvania | Districts | October 14, 1834 | 28 | 3 | ▼1 | 8 | ▼2 | 17 | ▲3 | 0 | Steady |
| South Carolina | Districts | October 13–14, 1834 | 9 | 0 | Steady | 0 | Steady | 2 | ▲1 | 7 | ▼1 |
| Vermont | Districts | September 2, 1834 | 5 | 3 | Steady | 2 | Steady | 0 | Steady | 0 | Steady |
Late elections after the March 4, 1835 beginning of the term.
| New Hampshire | At-large | March 10, 1835 | 5 | 0 | Steady | 0 | Steady | 5 | Steady | 0 | Steady |
| Virginia | Districts | April 1835 | 21 | 5 | ▼2 | 0 | Steady | 16 | ▲2 | 0 | Steady |
| Connecticut | At-large | April 9, 1835 | 6 | 0 | ▼6 | 0 | Steady | 6 | ▲6 | 0 | Steady |
| Alabama | Districts | August 3, 1835 | 5 | 2 | ▲2 | 0 | Steady | 2 | ▼2 | 1 | Steady |
| Indiana | Districts | August 3, 1835 | 7 | 1 | ▼1 | 0 | Steady | 6 | ▲1 | 0 | Steady |
| Missouri | At-large | August 3, 1835 | 2 | 1 | Steady | 0 | Steady | 1 | Steady | 0 | Steady |
| Kentucky | Districts | August 5, 1835 | 13 | 9 | Steady | 0 | Steady | 4 | Steady | 0 | Steady |
| Tennessee | Districts | August 5–6, 1835 | 13 | 9 | ▲8 | 0 | Steady | 4 | ▼8 | 0 | Steady |
| North Carolina | Districts | August 13, 1835 | 13 | 7 | Steady | 0 | Steady | 6 | Steady | 0 | Steady |
| Rhode Island | At-large | August 25, 1835 | 2 | 0 | ▼1 | 2 | ▲1 | 0 | Steady | 0 | Steady |
| Maryland | Districts | October 5, 1835 | 8 | 4 | ▲2 | 0 | Steady | 4 | ▼2 | 0 | Steady |
| Michigan (Note: New state) | At-large | October 5, 1835 | 1 | 0 | Steady | 0 | Steady | 1 | ▲1 | 0 | Steady |
| Mississippi | At-large | November 3–5, 1835 | 2 | 1 | ▲1 | 0 | Steady | 1 | ▼1 | 0 | Steady |
| Total | | | 241 ▲1 | 75 31.1% | ▲12 | 16 6.6% | ▼9 | 142 58.9% | Steady | 8 3.3% | ▼1 |

Popular vote
| Jacksonian | 49.69% |
| Nat'l Republican | 43.61% |
| Anti-Masonic | 3.12% |
| Nullifier | 1.19% |
| Independents | 3.22% |

House seats
| Jacksonian | 61.16% |
| Nat'l Republican | 33.06% |
| Nullifier | 3.31% |
| Anti-Masonic | 2.07% |
| Independent | 0.41% |

== Special elections ==
=== 23rd Congress ===
| District | Incumbent | | | This race | |
| District | Member | Party | First elected | Results | Candidates |
|---|---|---|---|---|---|
| Connecticut at-large 3 seats | William W. Ellsworth | National; Republican | 1829 | Incumbent resigned July 8, 1834. New member elected April 11, 1834 and seated December 1, 1834. National Republican hold. Winner later lost re-election; see below. | Elected on a general ticket: ▌ ✓ Phineas Miner (National Republican) 16.3%; ▌ ✓ Ebenezer Jackson Jr. (National Republican) 16.2%; ▌ ✓ Joseph Trumbull (National Republican) 16.2%; ▌Luthor Loomis (Unknown) 16.0%; ▌Lancelot Phelps (Jacksonian) 15.9%; ▌Samuel Ingham (Jacksonian) 15.8%; ▌Richard Hubbard (Unknown) 1.1%; ▌Horace Cowles (Unknown) 1.1%; ▌Sheldon C. Leavitt (Unknown) 1.0%; Scattering 0.4% |
| Connecticut at-large 3 seats | Jabez W. Huntington | National; Republican | 1829 | Incumbent resigned August 16, 1834 to become judge of the Connecticut Supreme Court of Errors. New member elected April 11, 1834 and seated December 1, 1834. National Republican hold. Winner was not a candidate for the next term; see below. | Elected on a general ticket: ▌ ✓ Phineas Miner (National Republican) 16.3%; ▌ ✓ Ebenezer Jackson Jr. (National Republican) 16.2%; ▌ ✓ Joseph Trumbull (National Republican) 16.2%; ▌Luthor Loomis (Unknown) 16.0%; ▌Lancelot Phelps (Jacksonian) 15.9%; ▌Samuel Ingham (Jacksonian) 15.8%; ▌Richard Hubbard (Unknown) 1.1%; ▌Horace Cowles (Unknown) 1.1%; ▌Sheldon C. Leavitt (Unknown) 1.0%; Scattering 0.4% |
| Connecticut at-large 3 seats | Samuel A. Foot | National; Republican | 1833 | Incumbent resigned May 9, 1834 to become Governor of Connecticut. New member elected April 11, 1834 and seated December 1, 1834. National Republican hold. Winner later lost re-election; see below. | Elected on a general ticket: ▌ ✓ Phineas Miner (National Republican) 16.3%; ▌ ✓ Ebenezer Jackson Jr. (National Republican) 16.2%; ▌ ✓ Joseph Trumbull (National Republican) 16.2%; ▌Luthor Loomis (Unknown) 16.0%; ▌Lancelot Phelps (Jacksonian) 15.9%; ▌Samuel Ingham (Jacksonian) 15.8%; ▌Richard Hubbard (Unknown) 1.1%; ▌Horace Cowles (Unknown) 1.1%; ▌Sheldon C. Leavitt (Unknown) 1.0%; Scattering 0.4% |
| Massachusetts 5 | John Davis | National; Republican | 1825 | Incumbent resigned January 14, 1834 to become Governor of Massachusetts. New member elected February 17, 1834 and seated March 5, 1834. National Republican hold. Winner was later re-elected; see below. | ▌ ✓ Levi Lincoln Jr. (National Republican) 79.15%; ▌Isaac Davis (Jacksonian) 20.85% |
| Maryland 1 | Littleton Dennis | National; Republican | 1833 | Incumbent died April 14, 1834. New member elected May 29, 1834 and seated June 9, 1834. National Republican hold. Winner was later re-elected; see below. | ▌ ✓ John N. Steele (National Republican) 62.17%; ▌James A. Stewart (Jacksonian) 37.83% |
| South Carolina 8 | James Blair | Jacksonian | 1828 | Incumbent died April 1, 1834. New member elected June 3, 1834 and seated December 8, 1834. Jacksonian hold. Winner was later re-elected; see below. | ▌ ✓ Richard I. Manning (Jacksonian) 59.29%; ▌Franklin H. Elmore (Nullifier) 40.71% |
| Kentucky 5 | Vacant | | | 1833 election of Thomas P. Moore declared invalid. House ordered new election. New member elected August 4, 1834 and seated December 1, 1834. National Republican gain. Winner was not a candidate for the next term; see below. | ▌ ✓ Robert P. Letcher (National Republican) 51.88%; ▌Thomas P. Moore (Jacksonian) 48.12% |
| Ohio 19 | Humphrey H. Leavitt | Jacksonian | 1830 (special) | Incumbent resigned July 10, 1834 to become U.S. District Judge. New member elected October 14, 1834 and seated December 1, 1834. Jacksonian hold. Winner was also elected to the next term; see below. | ▌ ✓ Daniel Kilgore (Jacksonian) (Note: Source did not provide vote count); ▌Samuel S. Stokely (National Republican) |
| New York 3 Plural district with 2 seats | Dudley Selden | Jacksonian | 1832 | Incumbent resigned July 2, 1834. New member elected November 3, 1834 and seated December 1, 1834. Jacksonian hold. | Elected on a general ticket: ▌ ✓ John J. Morgan (Jacksonian) 26.69%; ▌ ✓ Charles G. Ferris (Jacksonian) 26.68%; ▌Adoniram Chandler (Whig) 23.41%; ▌William Sampson (Whig) 23.22% |
| New York 3 Plural district with 2 seats | Cornelius Lawrence | Jacksonian | 1832 | Incumbent resigned May 14, 1834 to become Mayor of New York City. New member elected November 3, 1834 and seated December 1, 1834. Jacksonian hold. | Elected on a general ticket: ▌ ✓ John J. Morgan (Jacksonian) 26.69%; ▌ ✓ Charles G. Ferris (Jacksonian) 26.68%; ▌Adoniram Chandler (Whig) 23.41%; ▌William Sampson (Whig) 23.22% |
| Ohio 1 | Robert Todd Lytle | Jacksonian | 1832 | Incumbent resigned March 10, 1834. Incumbent re-elected November 8, 1834 and re-seated December 27, 1834, having already lost re-election; see below. Jacksonian hold. | ▌ ✓ Robert Todd Lytle (Jacksonian) 50.47%; ▌J. Washington Mason (National Republican) 49.54% |
| Vermont 5 | Benjamin F. Deming | Anti-Masonic | 1833 | Incumbent died July 11, 1834. New member elected November 10, 1834 and seated December 1, 1834. Anti-Masonic hold. Winner also elected to the next term; see below. | First ballot (September 2, 1834): ▌Isaac Fletcher (Jacksonian) 46.7%; ▌William Upham (National Republican) 36.8%; ▌Henry F. Janes (Anti-Masonic) 11.1%; Second ballot (November 10, 1834): ▌ ✓ Henry F. Janes (Anti-Masonic) 51.1%; ▌Isaac Fletcher (National Republican) 48.5% |
| Massachusetts 2 | Rufus Choate | National; Republican | 1830 | Incumbent resigned June 30, 1834. New member elected November 10, 1834 and seated December 1, 1834. National Republican hold. Winner also elected to the next term; see below. | ▌ ✓ Stephen C. Phillips (National Republican) 60.44%; ▌Joseph S. Cabot (Jacksonian) 39.56% |
South Carolina 3
South Carolina 5
Louisiana 3
Virginia 5
Virginia 11
Illinois 1
Illinois 3
Louisiana 1

=== 24th Congress ===
| District | Incumbent | | | This race | |
| District | Member | Party | First elected | Results | Candidates |
|---|---|---|---|---|---|
| South Carolina 6 | Warren R. Davis | Nullifier | 1826 | Incumbent died January 29, 1835. New member elected September 8, 1835 and seated December 7, 1835. National Republican gain. | ▌ ✓ Waddy Thompson (National Republican) 56.17%; ▌Benjamin Franklin Perry (Jacksonian) 43.84% |
| Georgia at-large 4 seats on a general ticket | James M. Wayne | Jacksonian | 1828 | Incumbent resigned January 13, 1835 to become Associate Justice of the U.S. Supreme Court. New member elected October 5, 1835 and seated December 7, 1835. Jacksonian hold. | ▌ ✓ Thomas Glascock (Jacksonian) 13.30%; ▌ ✓ Jesse F. Cleveland (Jacksonian) 13.10%; ▌ ✓ Jabez Y. Jackson (Jacksonian) 13.09%; ▌ ✓ Hopkins Holsey (Jacksonian) 12.95%; ▌Richard H. Wilde (Whig) 12.00%; ▌Thomas F. Foster (Whig) 11.99%; ▌Roger L. Gamble (Whig) 11.88%; ▌Robert A. Beall (Whig) 11.70% |
| Georgia at-large 4 seats on a general ticket | William Schley | Jacksonian | 1832 | Incumbent resigned July 1, 1835. New member elected October 5, 1835 and seated December 7, 1835. Jacksonian hold. | ▌ ✓ Thomas Glascock (Jacksonian) 13.30%; ▌ ✓ Jesse F. Cleveland (Jacksonian) 13.10%; ▌ ✓ Jabez Y. Jackson (Jacksonian) 13.09%; ▌ ✓ Hopkins Holsey (Jacksonian) 12.95%; ▌Richard H. Wilde (Whig) 12.00%; ▌Thomas F. Foster (Whig) 11.99%; ▌Roger L. Gamble (Whig) 11.88%; ▌Robert A. Beall (Whig) 11.70% |
| Georgia at-large 4 seats on a general ticket | James C. Terrell | Jacksonian | 1834 | Incumbent resigned July 8, 1835. New member elected October 5, 1835 and seated December 7, 1835. Jacksonian hold. | ▌ ✓ Thomas Glascock (Jacksonian) 13.30%; ▌ ✓ Jesse F. Cleveland (Jacksonian) 13.10%; ▌ ✓ Jabez Y. Jackson (Jacksonian) 13.09%; ▌ ✓ Hopkins Holsey (Jacksonian) 12.95%; ▌Richard H. Wilde (Whig) 12.00%; ▌Thomas F. Foster (Whig) 11.99%; ▌Roger L. Gamble (Whig) 11.88%; ▌Robert A. Beall (Whig) 11.70% |
| Georgia at-large 4 seats on a general ticket | John W. A. Sanford | Jacksonian | 1834 | Incumbent resigned July 25, 1835. New member elected October 5, 1835 and seated December 7, 1835. Jacksonian hold. | ▌ ✓ Thomas Glascock (Jacksonian) 13.30%; ▌ ✓ Jesse F. Cleveland (Jacksonian) 13.10%; ▌ ✓ Jabez Y. Jackson (Jacksonian) 13.09%; ▌ ✓ Hopkins Holsey (Jacksonian) 12.95%; ▌Richard H. Wilde (Whig) 12.00%; ▌Thomas F. Foster (Whig) 11.99%; ▌Roger L. Gamble (Whig) 11.88%; ▌Robert A. Beall (Whig) 11.70% |
| New York 3 | Campbell P. White | Jacksonian | 1828 | Incumbent resigned. New member elected November 4, 1835 and seated December 7, 1835. Jacksonian hold. | ▌ ✓ Gideon Lee (Jacksonian) 44.48%; ▌James Monroe (National Republican) 39.37%; ▌Charles G. Ferns (Independent Democratic) 16.15% |

== Alabama ==
Alabama elected its members August 3, 1835, after the beginning of the term but before the House convened.

| District | Incumbent | | | This race | |
| District | Member | Party | First elected | Results | Candidates |
|---|---|---|---|---|---|
| Alabama 1 | Clement Comer Clay | Jacksonian | 1829 | Incumbent retired. Jacksonian hold. | ▌ ✓ Reuben Chapman (Jacksonian) 47.78%; ▌Thomas D. Glascock (Jacksonian) 32.48%; ▌Robert T. Scott (Jacksonian) 19.74% |
| Alabama 2 | John McKinley | Jacksonian | 1833 | Incumbent retired. Jacksonian hold. | ▌ ✓ Joshua L. Martin (Jacksonian) 98.44%; Ralph Thatch (Unknown) 1.56% |
| Alabama 3 | Samuel W. Mardis | Jacksonian | 1831 | Incumbent retired. National Republican gain. | ▌ ✓ Joab Lawler (National Republican) 39.85%; ▌Eli Shortridge (Jacksonian) 38.73%; Max Pleasant (Unknown) 21.42% |
| Alabama 4 | Dixon H. Lewis | Nullifier | 1829 | Incumbent re-elected. | ▌ ✓ Dixon H. Lewis (Nullifier) 100.00% |
| Alabama 5 | John Murphy | Jacksonian | 1833 | Incumbent retired. National Republican gain. | ▌ ✓ Francis S. Lyon (National Republican) 49.13%; Joseph Bates (Unknown) 41.81%; ▌ R. E. B. Baylor (Jacksonian) 9.06% |

== Arkansas Territory ==
See Non-voting delegates, below.

== Connecticut ==
Connecticut elected its members April 9, 1835, after the beginning of the term but before the House convened.

| District | Incumbent | | | This race | |
| District | Member | Party | First elected | Results | Candidates |
|---|---|---|---|---|---|
| Connecticut at-large 6 seats | Joseph Trumbull | National; Republican | 1834 (special) | Incumbent lost re-election. Jacksonian gain. | Elected on a general ticket: ▌ ✓ Samuel Ingham (Jacksonian) 8.8%; ▌ ✓ Isaac Toucey (Jacksonian) 8.8%; ▌ ✓ Zalmon Wildman (Jacksonian) 8.8%; ▌ ✓ Elisha Haley (Jacksonian) 8.8%; ▌ ✓ Lancelot Phelps (Jacksonian) 8.7%; ▌ ✓ Andrew T. Judson (Jacksonian) 8.7%; ▌John M. Holley (National Republican) 7.9%; ▌Noyes Barber (National Republican) 7.8%; ▌Ebenezer Young (National Republican) 7.8%; ▌Samuel Tweedy (National Republican) 7.8%; ▌Joseph Trumbull (National Republican) 7.7%; ▌Ebenezer Jackson Jr. (National Republican) 7.6% |
| Connecticut at-large 6 seats | Phineas Miner | National; Republican | 1834 (special) | Incumbent retired. Jacksonian gain. | |
| Connecticut at-large 6 seats | Ebenezer Jackson Jr. | National; Republican | 1834 (special) | Incumbent lost re-election. Jacksonian gain. | |
| Connecticut at-large 6 seats | Ebenezer Young | National; Republican | 1829 | Incumbent lost re-election. Jacksonian gain. | |
| Connecticut at-large 6 seats | Noyes Barber | National; Republican | 1821 | Incumbent lost re-election. Jacksonian gain. | |
| Connecticut at-large 6 seats | Samuel Tweedy | National; Republican | 1833 | Incumbent lost re-election. Jacksonian gain. | |

== Delaware ==
Delaware re-elected its member November 11, 1834.

| District | Incumbent | | | This race | |
| District | Member | Party | First elected | Results | Candidates |
|---|---|---|---|---|---|
| Delaware at-large | John J. Milligan | National; Republican | 1830 | Incumbent re-elected. | ▌ ✓ John J. Milligan (National Republican); [data missing] |

== Florida Territory ==
See Non-voting delegates, below.

== Georgia ==
Elections were held October 6, 1834.

| District | Incumbent | | | This race | |
| District | Member | Party | First elected | Results | Candidates |
|---|---|---|---|---|---|
| Georgia at-large 9 at-large seats | James M. Wayne | Jacksonian | 1828 | Incumbent re-elected but declined the seat. Incumbent resigned January 13, 1835 to become Associate Justice of the U.S. Supreme Court. | Elected on a general ticket: ▌ ✓ James Moore Wayne (Jacksonian) 6.06%; ▌ ✓ William Schley (Jacksonian) 6.05%; ▌ ✓ George W. Towns (Jacksonian) 6.00%; ▌ ✓ John E. Coffee (Jacksonian) 6.00%; ▌ ✓ George W. Owens (Jacksonian) 5.99%; ▌ ✓ James C. Terrell (Jacksonian) 5.98%; ▌ ✓ Seaton Grantland (Jacksonian) 5.97%; ▌ ✓ John W. A. Sanford (Jacksonian) 5.96%; ▌ ✓ Charles Eaton Haynes (Jacksonian) 5.96%; ▌George R. Gilmer (National Republican) 5.23%; ▌Richard H. Wilde (National Republican) 5.21%; ▌Thomas F. Foster (National Republican) 5.16%; ▌Roger L. Gamble (National Republican) 5.12%; ▌Absalom H. Chappell (National Republican) 5.09%; ▌Henry Greybill Lamar (National Republican) 5.06%; ▌Robert A. Beall (National Republican) 5.06%; ▌Daniel Newnan (National Republican) 5.05%; ▌William C. Daniel (National Republican) 5.05% |
| Georgia at-large 9 at-large seats | William Schley | Jacksonian | 1832 | Incumbent re-elected. | |
| Georgia at-large 9 at-large seats | John E. Coffee | Jacksonian | 1832 | Incumbent re-elected. | |
| Georgia at-large 9 at-large seats | Seaborn Jones | Jacksonian | 1832 | Incumbent retired. Jacksonian hold. | |
| Georgia at-large 9 at-large seats | Augustin S. Clayton | Jacksonian | 1831 (special) | Incumbent retired. Jacksonian hold. | |
| Georgia at-large 9 at-large seats | George R. Gilmer | Jacksonian | 1820; 1822 (retired); 1832 | Incumbent lost re-election. Jacksonian hold. | |
| Georgia at-large 9 at-large seats | Richard H. Wilde | Jacksonian | 1814; 1816 (lost); 1824 (special); 1824 (retired); 1827 (special) | Incumbent lost re-election. Jacksonian hold. | |
| Georgia at-large 9 at-large seats | Thomas F. Foster | Jacksonian | 1828 | Incumbent lost re-election. Jacksonian hold. | |
| Georgia at-large 9 at-large seats | Roger L. Gamble | Jacksonian | 1832 | Incumbent lost re-election. Jacksonian hold. | |

== Illinois ==
Illinois elected its three members on August 4, 1834.

| District | Incumbent | | | This race | |
| District | Member | Party | First elected | Results | Candidates |
|---|---|---|---|---|---|
| Illinois 1 | Vacant | | | Rep. Charles Slade (J) died July 26, 1834. Jacksonian hold. Winner was also elected to unexpired term, see above. | ▌ ✓ John Reynolds (Jacksonian) 45.9%; ▌Adam W. Snyder (Jacksonian) 37.8%; ▌Edward Humphrey (Unknown) 16.3% |
| Illinois 2 | Zadok Casey | Jacksonian | 1832 | Incumbent re-elected. | ▌ ✓ Zadok Casey (Jacksonian) 58.3%; ▌William H. Davidson (National Republican) 41.7% |
| Illinois 3 | Joseph Duncan | Jacksonian | 1826 | Incumbent retired to run for Governor of Illinois. Jacksonian hold. | ▌ ✓ William L. May (Jacksonian) 52.8%; ▌Benjamin Mills (National Republican) 47.2% |

== Indiana ==
Indiana elected its members August 3, 1835, after the beginning of the term but before the House convened.

| District | Incumbent | | | This race | |
| District | Member | Party | First elected | Results | Candidates |
|---|---|---|---|---|---|
| Indiana 1 | Ratliff Boon | Jacksonian | 1828 | Incumbent re-elected. | ▌ ✓ Ratliff Boon (Jacksonian) 51.36%; ▌John G. Clendenin (National Republican) 48.64% |
| Indiana 2 | John Ewing | National; Republican | 1833 | Incumbent lost re-election. Jacksonian gain. | ▌ ✓ John W. Davis (Jacksonian) 55.33%; ▌ John Ewing (National Republican) 44.67% |
| Indiana 3 | John Carr | Jacksonian | 1831 | Incumbent re-elected. | ▌ ✓ John Carr (Jacksonian) 56.08%; ▌Charles Dewey (National Republican) 43.92% |
| Indiana 4 | Amos Lane | Jacksonian | 1833 | Incumbent re-elected. | ▌ ✓ Amos Lane (Jacksonian) 50.43%; ▌George H. Dunn (National Republican) 49.57% |
| Indiana 5 | Johnathan McCarty | Jacksonian | 1831 | Incumbent re-elected. | ▌ ✓ Johnathan McCarty (Jacksonian) 48.92%; ▌ James Rariden (National Republican) 27.22%; John Finley (Unknown) 23.86% |
| Indiana 6 | George L. Kinnard | Jacksonian | 1833 | Incumbent re-elected. | ▌ ✓ George L. Kinnard (Jacksonian) 61.63%; Jacob B. Lowe (Unknown) 38.37% |
| Indiana 7 | Edward A. Hannegan | Jacksonian | 1833 | Incumbent re-elected. | ▌ ✓ Edward A. Hannegan (Jacksonian) 66.28%; ▌James Gregory (National Republican) 33.72% |

== Kentucky ==
Kentucky elected its members August 5, 1835, after the beginning of the term but before the House convened.

| District | Incumbent | | | This race | |
| District | Member | Party | First elected | Results | Candidates |
|---|---|---|---|---|---|
| Kentucky 1 | Chittenden Lyon | Jacksonian | 1833 | Incumbent retired. Jacksonian hold. | ▌ ✓ Linn Boyd (Jacksonian) 40.96%; ▌ John L. Murray (Jacksonian) 37.90%; ▌ William Grundy (National Republican) 21.15% |
| Kentucky 2 | Albert G. Hawes | Jacksonian | 1833 | Incumbent re-elected. | ▌ ✓ Albert G. Hawes (Jacksonian) 51.18%; ▌ Philip Triplett (National Republican) 48.82% |
| Kentucky 3 | Christopher Tompkins | National Republican | 1833 | Incumbent retired. National Republican hold. | ▌ ✓ Joseph R. Underwood (National Republican) 51.68%; ▌ Elijah Hise (Jacksonian) 48.32% |
| Kentucky 4 | Martin Beaty | National Republican | 1833 | Unknown if incumbent retired or lost re-election. National Republican hold. | ▌ ✓ Sherrod Williams (National Republican) 100.00% |
Kentucky 5
Kentucky 6
Kentucky 7
Kentucky 8
Kentucky 9
Kentucky 10
Kentucky 11
Kentucky 12
Kentucky 13

== Louisiana ==
Louisiana elected its members July 7–9, 1834.

| District | Incumbent | | | This race | |
| District | Member | Party | First elected | Results | Candidates |
Louisiana 1
Louisiana 2
Louisiana 3

== Maine ==
Maine elected its members September 8, 1834.

| District | Incumbent | | | This race | |
| District | Member | Party | First elected | Results | Candidates |
Maine 1
Maine 2
Maine 3
Maine 4
Maine 5
Maine 6
Maine 7
| Maine 8 | Gorham Parks | Jacksonian | 1833 | Incumbent re-elected. | ▌ ✓ Gorham Parks (Jacksonian) 56.17%; ▌Edward Kent (Whig) 43.83% |

== Maryland ==
Maryland elected its members October 5, 1835, after the beginning of the term but before the House convened.

| District | Incumbent | | | This race | |
| District | Member | Party | First elected | Results | Candidates |
Maryland 1
Maryland 2
Maryland 3
Maryland 4
Maryland 5
Maryland 6
Maryland 7
Maryland 8

== Massachusetts ==
Elections were held November 10, 1834, but at least one district's elections went to multiple ballots into 1835.

| District | Incumbent | | | This race | |
| District | Member | Party | First elected | Results | Candidates |
Massachusetts 1
Massachusetts 2
Massachusetts 3
Massachusetts 4
Massachusetts 5
Massachusetts 6
Massachusetts 7
Massachusetts 8
Massachusetts 9
| Massachusetts 10 | William Baylies | Whig (Note: Changed from National Republican) | 1808; 1809 (lost contest); 1812; 1816 (retired); 1833 | Incumbent lost re-election. New member elected on the third ballot. Democratic gain. | First ballot (November 10, 1834): ▌Nathaniel B. Borden (Democratic) 49.20%; ▌William Baylies (Whig) 48.10%; Scattering 2.69%; Second ballot (December 15, 1834): ▌Nathaniel B. Borden (Democratic) 49.57%; ▌William Baylies (Whig) 48.19%; ▌Cornwell Washburn (Unknown) 2.24%; Third ballot (January 7, 1835): ▌ ✓ Nathaniel B. Borden (Democratic) 53.81%; ▌William Baylies (Whig) 46.20% |
| Massachusetts 11 | John Reed Jr. | Anti-Masonic | 1812; 1816 (lost); 1820 | Incumbent re-elected. | ▌ ✓ John Reed Jr. (Anti-Masonic); [data missing] |
| Massachusetts 12 | John Quincy Adams | Anti-Masonic | 1830 | Incumbent re-elected. | ▌ ✓ John Quincy Adams (Anti-Masonic); ▌Abel Cushing (Unknown) 4.72%; Scattering 8.99% |

== Michigan ==
Michigan elected its member October 5, 1835, after the beginning of the term but before the House convened.

The House refused to admit the member from Michigan due to a conflict with Ohio, so he was seated only as a non-voting delegate until January 27, 1837.

| District | Incumbent | | | This race | |
| District | Delegate | Party | First elected | Results | Candidates |
|---|---|---|---|---|---|
| Michigan at-large | New seat | | | Michigan was admitted to the Union on January 26, 1837. New member elected October 5, 1835. Jacksonian gain. The house refused to admit the member due to a conflict with Ohio, so he was seated only as a non-voting delegate until January 27, 1837. | ▌ ✓ Isaac E. Crary (Jacksonian) 95.94%; ▌William Woodbridge (Unknown) 3.32%; Scattering 0.74% |

== Michigan Territory ==
See Non-voting delegates, below.

== Mississippi ==
Mississippi elected its members November 3–5, 1835, after the beginning of the term but before the House convened.

| District | Incumbent | | | This race | |
| District | Member | Party | First elected | Results | Candidates |
|---|---|---|---|---|---|
| Mississippi at-large (2 seats) | Franklin E. Plummer | Jacksonian | 1830 | Incumbent retired to run for U.S. senator. Jacksonian hold. | ▌ ✓ David Dickson (National Republican) 27.60%; ▌ ✓ John F. H. Claiborne (Jacksonian) 26.92%; ▌Benjamin W. Edwards (Unknown) 23.06%; ▌James C. Wilkins (National Republican) 21.78%; ▌Harry Vose (Unknown) 0.64% |
| Mississippi at-large (2 seats) | Harry Cage | Jacksonian | 1832 | Incumbent retired. National Republican gain. | ▌ ✓ David Dickson (National Republican) 27.60%; ▌ ✓ John F. H. Claiborne (Jacksonian) 26.92%; ▌Benjamin W. Edwards (Unknown) 23.06%; ▌James C. Wilkins (National Republican) 21.78%; ▌Harry Vose (Unknown) 0.64% |

== Missouri ==
Missouri elected its members August 3, 1835, after the beginning of the term but before the House convened.

| District | Incumbent | | | This race | |
| District | Member | Party | First elected | Results | Candidates |
|---|---|---|---|---|---|
| Missouri 1 Plural district with 2 seats | | | | | |

== New Hampshire ==
New Hampshire elected its members March 10, 1835, after the beginning of the term but before the House convened.

| District | Incumbent | | | This race | |
| District | Member | Party | First elected | Results | Candidates |
|---|---|---|---|---|---|
| New Hampshire 1 Plural district with 5 seats | | | | | |

== New Jersey ==
New Jersey elected its members October 14, 1834.

| District | Incumbent | | | This race | |
| District | Member | Party | First elected | Results | Candidates |
|---|---|---|---|---|---|
| New Jersey 1 Plural district with 6 seats | | | | | |

== New York ==
New York elected its members November 3–5, 1834.

| District | Incumbent | | | This race | |
| District | Member | Party | First elected | Results | Candidates |
New York 1
New York 2
New York 3
New York 4
New York 5
New York 6
New York 7
New York 8
New York 9
New York 10
New York 11
New York 12
New York 13
New York 14
New York 15
New York 16
New York 17
New York 18
New York 19
New York 20
New York 21
New York 22
New York 23
New York 24
New York 25
New York 26
New York 27
New York 28
New York 29
New York 30
New York 31
New York 32
New York 33
New York 34
New York 35
New York 36
New York 37
New York 38
New York 39
New York 40

== North Carolina ==
North Carolina elected its members August 13, 1835, after the beginning of the term but before the House convened.

| District | Incumbent | | | This race | |
| District | Member | Party | First elected | Results | Candidates |
|---|---|---|---|---|---|
| North Carolina 1 | William Biddle Shepard | National; Republican | 1829 | Incumbent re-elected. | ▌ ✓ William Biddle Shepard (National Republican) 79.26%; ▌Isaac Pipkin (Jacksonian) 13.42%; ▌ Samuel Tredwell Sawyer (National Republican) 4.07%; ▌David E. Sumner (Jacksonian) 3.25% |
| North Carolina 2 | Jesse Atherton Bynum | Jacksonian | 1833 | Incumbent re-elected. | ▌ ✓ Jesse Atherton Bynum (Jacksonian) 52.87%; ▌William L. Long (National Republican) 47.13% |
| North Carolina 3 | Thomas H. Hall | Jacksonian | 1827 | Incumbent lost re-election. National Republican gain. | ▌ ✓ Ebenezer Pettigrew (National Republican) 54.85%; ▌ Thomas H. Hall (Jacksonian) 45.15% |
| North Carolina 4 | Jesse Speight | Jacksonian | 1829 | Incumbent re-elected. | ▌ ✓ Jesse Speight (Jacksonian) 57.28%; ▌John McLeod (National Republican) 42.72% |
| North Carolina 5 | James I. McKay | Jacksonian | 1831 | Incumbent re-elected. | ▌ ✓ James I. McKay (Jacksonian) 62.25%; ▌Lewis Dishongh (National Republican) 37.75% |
| North Carolina 6 | | | | | |
| North Carolina 7 | | | | | |
| North Carolina 8 | | | | | |
| North Carolina 9 | | | | | |
| North Carolina 10 | | | | | |
| North Carolina 11 | | | | | |
| North Carolina 12 | James Graham | National; Republican | 1833 | Election result was disputed. House Committee on Elections awarded the election to the challenger, the full House voted to unseat the incumbent but then declined to seat the challenger, leaving the seat vacant. National Republican loss. | ▌ ✓ James Graham (National Republican) 50.05%; ▌David Newland (Jacksonian) 49.95% |
| North Carolina 13 | | | | | |

== Ohio ==
Ohio elected its members October 14, 1834.

| District | Incumbent | | | This race | |
| District | Member | Party | First elected | Results | Candidates |
Ohio 1
Ohio 2
Ohio 3
Ohio 4
Ohio 5
Ohio 6
Ohio 7
Ohio 8
Ohio 9
Ohio 10
Ohio 11
Ohio 12
Ohio 13
Ohio 14
Ohio 15
Ohio 16
Ohio 17
Ohio 18
Ohio 19

== Pennsylvania ==
Pennsylvania elected its members October 14, 1834.

| District | Incumbent | | | This race | |
| District | Member | Party | First elected | Results | Candidates (Note: For plural districts, percent is based on assumption that each voter cast as many votes as there are seats) |
|---|---|---|---|---|---|
| Pennsylvania 1 | Joel B. Sutherland | Jacksonian | 1826 | Incumbent re-elected. | ▌ ✓ Joel B. Sutherland (Jacksonian) 61.7%; ▌James Gowen (Unknown) 38.3% |
| Pennsylvania 2 Plural district with 2 seats | Horace Binney | National; Republican | 1832 | Incumbent retired. National Republican hold. | ▌ ✓ Joseph R. Ingersoll (National Republican) 60.4%; ▌ ✓ James Harper (National Republican) 59.9%; ▌James M. Linnard (Jacksonian) 40.1%; ▌Henry Horn (Jacksonian) 39.6% |
| Pennsylvania 2 Plural district with 2 seats | James Harper | National; Republican | 1832 | Incumbent re-elected. | ▌ ✓ Joseph R. Ingersoll (National Republican) 60.4%; ▌ ✓ James Harper (National Republican) 59.9%; ▌James M. Linnard (Jacksonian) 40.1%; ▌Henry Horn (Jacksonian) 39.6% |
| Pennsylvania 3 | John G. Watmough | National; Republican | 1830 | Incumbent lost re-election. Jacksonian gain. | ▌ ✓ Michael W. Ash (Jacksonian) 55.6%; ▌John G. Watmough (National Republican) 44.4% |
| Pennsylvania 4 Plural district with 3 seats | William Hiester | Anti-Masonic | 1830 | Incumbent re-elected. | ▌ ✓ William Hiester (Anti-Masonic) 55.0%; ▌ ✓ David Potts Jr. (Anti-Masonic) 55.0%; ▌ ✓ Edward Darlington (Anti-Masonic) 54.9%; ▌Archibald T. Dick (Jacksonian) 45.1%; ▌Benjamin Champneys (Jacksonian) 45.0%; ▌John Morgan (Jacksonian) 45.0% |
| Pennsylvania 4 Plural district with 3 seats | Edward Darlington | Anti-Masonic | 1832 | Incumbent re-elected. | ▌ ✓ William Hiester (Anti-Masonic) 55.0%; ▌ ✓ David Potts Jr. (Anti-Masonic) 55.0%; ▌ ✓ Edward Darlington (Anti-Masonic) 54.9%; ▌Archibald T. Dick (Jacksonian) 45.1%; ▌Benjamin Champneys (Jacksonian) 45.0%; ▌John Morgan (Jacksonian) 45.0% |
| Pennsylvania 4 Plural district with 3 seats | David Potts Jr. | Anti-Masonic | 1830 | Incumbent re-elected. | ▌ ✓ William Hiester (Anti-Masonic) 55.0%; ▌ ✓ David Potts Jr. (Anti-Masonic) 55.0%; ▌ ✓ Edward Darlington (Anti-Masonic) 54.9%; ▌Archibald T. Dick (Jacksonian) 45.1%; ▌Benjamin Champneys (Jacksonian) 45.0%; ▌John Morgan (Jacksonian) 45.0% |
| Pennsylvania 5 | Joel K. Mann | Jacksonian | 1830 | Incumbent retired. Jacksonian hold. | ▌ ✓ Jacob Fry Jr. (Jacksonian) 55.3%; ▌James Royer (Unknown) 44.7% |
| Pennsylvania 6 | Robert Ramsey | Jacksonian | 1832 | Incumbent retired. National Republican gain. | ▌ ✓ Mathias Morris (National Republican) 52.4%; ▌Henry Chapman (Jacksonian) 47.6% |
| Pennsylvania 7 | David D. Wagener | Jacksonian | 1832 | Incumbent re-elected. | ▌ ✓ David D. Wagener (Jacksonian) 68.1%; ▌Alexander E. Brown (Unknown) 31.9% |
| Pennsylvania 8 | Henry King | Jacksonian | 1830 | Incumbent retired. Jacksonian hold. | ▌ ✓ Edward B. Hubley (Jacksonian) 59.6%; ▌Walter C. Livingston (Unknown) 40.4% |
| Pennsylvania 9 | Henry A. P. Muhlenberg | Jacksonian | 1828 | Incumbent re-elected. | ▌ ✓ Henry A. P. Muhlenberg (Jacksonian) 69.3%; ▌Stanly Kirby (Unknown) 30.7% |
| Pennsylvania 10 | William Clark | Anti-Masonic | 1832 | Incumbent re-elected. | ▌ ✓ William Clark (Anti-Masonic) 54.0%; ▌John C. Bucher (Jacksonian) 46.0% |
| Pennsylvania 11 | Charles A. Barnitz | Anti-Masonic | 1832 | Incumbent lost re-election. Jacksonian gain. | ▌ ✓ Henry Logan (Jacksonian) 54.2%; ▌Charles A. Barnitz (Anti-Masonic) 45.8% |
| Pennsylvania 12 | George Chambers | Anti-Masonic | 1832 | Incumbent re-elected. | ▌ ✓ George Chambers (Anti-Masonic) 59.8%; ▌Ludwig Heck (Jacksonian) 40.2% |
| Pennsylvania 13 | Jesse Miller | Jacksonian | 1832 | Incumbent re-elected. | ▌ ✓ Jesse Miller (Jacksonian) 51.4%; ▌Thomas Whiteside (Anti-Masonic) 48.6% |
| Pennsylvania 14 | Joseph Henderson | Jacksonian | 1832 | Incumbent re-elected. | ▌ ✓ Joseph Henderson (Jacksonian) 52.5%; ▌James Milliken (Anti-Masonic) 47.5% |
| Pennsylvania 15 | Andrew Beaumont | Jacksonian | 1832 | Incumbent re-elected. | ▌ ✓ Andrew Beaumont (Jacksonian) 56.1%; ▌Charles D. Shoemaker (Unknown) 43.9% |
| Pennsylvania 16 | Joseph B. Anthony | Jacksonian | 1832 | Incumbent re-elected. | ▌ ✓ Joseph B. Anthony (Jacksonian) 62.8%; ▌Samuel J. Packer (Unknown) 37.2% |
| Pennsylvania 17 | John Laporte | Jacksonian | 1832 | Incumbent re-elected. | ▌ ✓ John Laporte (Jacksonian) 56.8%; ▌Horrace Williston (Unknown) 43.2% |
| Pennsylvania 18 | George Burd | National; Republican | 1830 | Incumbent retired. Jacksonian gain. | ▌ ✓ Job Mann (Jacksonian) 54.6%; ▌Charles Ogle (Anti-Masonic) 45.4% |
| Pennsylvania 19 | Richard Coulter | Jacksonian | 1826 | Incumbent lost re-election. Jacksonian hold. | ▌ ✓ John Klingensmith Jr. (Jacksonian) 59.7%; ▌Richard Coulter (Jacksonian) 40.3% |
| Pennsylvania 20 | Andrew Stewart | Anti-Masonic | 1820; 1828 (lost); 1830 | Incumbent lost re-election. Jacksonian gain. | ▌ ✓ Andrew Buchanan (Jacksonian) 58.9%; ▌Andrew Stewart (Anti-Masonic) 41.1% |
| Pennsylvania 21 | Thomas M. T. McKennan | Anti-Masonic | 1830 | Incumbent re-elected. | ▌ ✓ Thomas M. T. McKennan (Anti-Masonic) 51.3%; ▌Thomas Ringland (Jacksonian) 48.7% |
| Pennsylvania 22 | Harmar Denny | Anti-Masonic | 1829 (special) | Incumbent re-elected. | ▌ ✓ Harmar Denny (Anti-Masonic) 53.5%; ▌John M. Snowden (Jacksonian) 46.5% |
| Pennsylvania 23 | Samuel S. Harrison | Jacksonian | 1832 | Incumbent re-elected. | ▌ ✓ Samuel S. Harrison (Jacksonian) 69.9%; ▌John Gilmore (Unknown) 30.1% |
| Pennsylvania 24 | John Banks | Anti-Masonic | 1830 | Incumbent re-elected. | ▌ ✓ John Banks (Anti-Masonic) 52.2%; ▌Samuel Power (Jacksonian) 47.8% |
| Pennsylvania 25 | John Galbraith | Jacksonian | 1832 | Incumbent re-elected. | ▌ ✓ John Galbraith (Jacksonian) 60.6%; ▌Thomas H. Sill (Anti-Masonic) 39.4% |

== Rhode Island ==
Rhode Island elected its members August 25, 1835, after the beginning of the term but before the House convened.

| District | Incumbent | | | This race | |
| District | Member | Party | First elected | Results | Candidates |
|---|---|---|---|---|---|
| Rhode Island 1 Plural district with 2 seats | | | | | |

== South Carolina ==
South Carolina elected its members October 13–14, 1834.

| District | Incumbent | | | This race | |
| District | Member | Party | First elected | Results | Candidates |
South Carolina 1
South Carolina 2
South Carolina 3
South Carolina 4
South Carolina 5
South Carolina 6
South Carolina 7
South Carolina 8
South Carolina 9

== Tennessee ==
Tennessee elected its members August 5–6, 1835, after the beginning of the term but before the House convened.

| District | Incumbent | | | This race | |
| District | Member | Party | First elected | Results | Candidates |
|---|---|---|---|---|---|
| Tennessee 1 | John Blair | Jacksonian | 1823 | Incumbent retired. National Republican gain. | ▌ ✓ William B. Carter (National Republican) 48.55%; ▌Alexander O. Anderson (Jacksonian) 26.98%; ▌Thomas D. Arnold (National Republican) 24.47% |
| Tennessee 2 | Samuel Bunch | Jacksonian | 1833 | Incumbent re-elected as a National Republican. National Republican gain. | ▌ ✓ Samuel Bunch (National Republican) 68.32%; ▌David Adams (Jacksonian) 31.68% |
| Tennessee 3 | Luke Lea | Jacksonian | 1833 | Incumbent re-elected as a National Republican. National Republican gain. | ▌ ✓ Luke Lea (National Republican) 58.69%; ▌Joseph L. Williams (Jacksonian) 41.32% |
| Tennessee 4 | James I. Standifer | Jacksonian | 1829 | Incumbent re-elected as a National Republican. National Republican gain. | ▌ ✓ James I. Standifer (National Republican) 60.06%; ▌William T. Senter (Jacksonian) 39.94% |
| Tennessee 5 | John B. Forester | Jacksonian | 1831 | Incumbent re-elected as a National Republican. National Republican gain. | ▌ ✓ John B. Forester (National Republican) 83.54%; ▌Peter Buram (Jacksonian) 16.46% |
| Tennessee 6 | Balie Peyton | Jacksonian | 1833 | Incumbent re-elected as a National Republican. National Republican gain. | ▌ ✓ Balie Peyton (National Republican) 100% |
| Tennessee 7 | John Bell | Jacksonian | 1827 | Incumbent re-elected as a National Republican. National Republican gain. | ▌ ✓ John Bell (National Republican) 100% |
| Tennessee 8 | David W. Dickinson | Jacksonian | 1833 | Incumbent retired. National Republican gain. | ▌ ✓ Abram P. Maury (National Republican) 60.58%; ▌Robert Jetton (Jacksonian) 39.42% |
| Tennessee 9 | James K. Polk | Jacksonian | 1825 | Incumbent re-elected. | ▌ ✓ James K. Polk (Jacksonian) 100% |
| Tennessee 10 | William M. Inge | Jacksonian | 1833 | Incumbent retired. National Republican gain. | ▌ ✓ Ebenezer J. Shields (National Republican) 40.51%; ▌Thomas Porter (Unknown) 29.98%; ▌Andrew A. Kincannon (Unknown) 29.51% |
| Tennessee 11 | Cave Johnson | Jacksonian | 1829 | Incumbent re-elected. | ▌ ✓ Cave Johnson (Jacksonian) 60.63%; ▌William Turner (National Republican) 39.37% |
| Tennessee 12 | Davy Crockett | National; Republican | 1833 | Incumbent lost re-election. Jacksonian gain. | ▌ ✓ Adam Huntsman (Jacksonian) 51.39%; ▌Davy Crockett (National Republican) 48.61% |
| Tennessee 13 | William C. Dunlap | Jacksonian | 1833 | Incumbent re-elected. | ▌ ✓ William C. Dunlap (Jacksonian) 57.46%; ▌Christopher H. Williams (National Republican) 42.54% |

== Vermont ==
Vermont elected its members September 2, 1834.

| District | Incumbent | | | This race | |
| District | Member | Party | First elected | Results | Candidates |
|---|---|---|---|---|---|
| Vermont 1 | Hiland Hall | National; Republican | 1833 (special) | Incumbent re-elected. | ▌ ✓ Hiland Hall (National Republican) 50.8%; ▌John S. Robinson (Jacksonian) 27.6%; ▌John S. Pettibone (Anti-Masonic) 19.8% |
| Vermont 2 | William Slade | Anti-Masonic | 1831 (special) | Incumbent re-elected. | ▌ ✓ William Slade (Anti-Masonic) 55.0%; ▌Jonas Clark (Jacksonian) 20.5%; ▌Robert Pierpoint (National Republican) 20.5% |
| Vermont 3 | Horace Everett | National; Republican | 1828 | Incumbent re-elected. | First ballot: ▌Horace Everett (National Republican) 44.5%; ▌Samuel Loveland (Anti-Masonic) 33.2%; ▌Alden Partridge (Jacksonian) 21.0%; Second ballot: ▌ ✓ Horace Everett (National Republican) 52.9%; ▌Samuel Loveland (Anti-Masonic) 25.4%; ▌Alden Partridge (Jacksonian) 21.7% |
| Vermont 4 | Heman Allen | National; Republican | 1832 (late) | Incumbent re-elected. | First ballot: ▌ Heman Allen (National Republican) 40.8%; ▌Cornelius P. Van Ness (Jacksonian) 31.5%; ▌John Smith (Anti-Masonic) 26.3%; Second ballot: ▌ ✓ Heman Allen (National Republican) 51.2%; ▌Cornelius P. Van Ness (Jacksonian) 33.3%; ▌John Smith (Anti-Masonic) 15.5% |
| Vermont 5 | Benjamin F. Deming | Anti-Masonic | 1833 | Incumbent retired. Anti-Masonic hold. | First ballot: ▌Isaac Fletcher (Jacksonian) 44.5%; ▌William Upham (National Republican) 38.0%; ▌Henry Fisk Janes (Anti-Masonic) 11.6%; Second ballot: ▌ ✓ Henry Fisk Janes (Anti-Masonic) 51.5%; ▌Isaac Fletcher (Jacksonian) 48.1% |

== Virginia ==
Virginia elected its members April 1835, after the beginning of the term but before the House convened.

| District | Incumbent | | | This race | |
| District | Member | Party | First elected | Results | Candidates |
|---|---|---|---|---|---|
| Virginia 1 | George Loyall | Jacksonian | 1833 | Incumbent re-elected. | ▌ ✓ George Loyall (Jacksonian) 52.5%; ▌Arthur Emmerson (National Republican) 47.5% |
| Virginia 2 | John Y. Mason | Jacksonian | 1831 | Incumbent re-elected. | ▌ ✓ John Y. Mason (Jacksonian) 72.1%; ▌John Urquehart (National Republican) 27.9% |
| Virginia 3 | William S. Archer | Jacksonian | 1820 (special) | Incumbent lost re-election as a National Republican. Jacksonian hold. | ▌ ✓ John Winston Jones (Jacksonian) 68.1%; ▌William S. Archer (National Republican) 31.9% |
| Virginia 4 | James Gholson | National Republican | 1833 | Incumbent lost re-election. Jacksonian gain. | ▌ ✓ George Dromgoole (Jacksonian) 55.6%; ▌James Gholson (National Republican) 44.4% |
| Virginia 5 | James Bouldin | Jacksonian | 1834 (special) | Incumbent re-elected. | ▌ ✓ James Bouldin (Jacksonian) 59.0%; ▌Philip A. Bolling (National Republican) 41.0% |
| Virginia 6 | Thomas Davenport | National Republican | 1825 | Incumbent lost re-election. Jacksonian gain. | ▌ ✓ Walter Coles (Jacksonian) 54.1%; ▌Thomas Davenport (National Republican) 45.9% |
| Virginia 7 | Nathaniel Claiborne | Jacksonian | 1825 | Incumbent re-elected as a National Republican. National Republican gain. | ▌ ✓ Nathaniel Claiborne (National Republican) 51.3%; ▌Alexander H. H. Stuart (Jacksonian) 48.7% |
| Virginia 8 | Henry A. Wise | Jacksonian | 1833 | Incumbent re-elected. | ▌ ✓ Henry A. Wise (Jacksonian) 63.0%; ▌Richard Coke Jr. (National Republican) 37.0% |
| Virginia 9 | William P. Taylor | National; Republican | 1833 | Incumbent lost re-election. Jacksonian gain. | ▌ ✓ John Roane (Jacksonian) 50.3%; ▌William P. Taylor (National Republican) 49.7% |
| Virginia 10 | Joseph Chinn | Jacksonian | 1831 | Incumbent lost re-election. National Republican gain. | ▌ ✓ John Taliaferro (National Republican) 50.8%; ▌Joseph Chinn (Jacksonian) 49.2% |
| Virginia 11 | John Robertson | National; Republican | 1834 (special) | Incumbent re-elected. | ▌ ✓ John Robertson (National Republican) 53.6%; ▌William H. Roane (Jacksonian) 46.4% |
| Virginia 12 | William F. Gordon | Jacksonian | 1829 (special) | Incumbent lost re-election as a National Republican. Jacksonian hold. | ▌ ✓ James Garland (Jacksonian) 55.7%; ▌William F. Gordon (National Republican) 44.3% |
| Virginia 13 | John M. Patton | Jacksonian | 1830 (special) | Incumbent re-elected. | ▌ ✓ John M. Patton (Jacksonian) 100% |
| Virginia 14 | Charles F. Mercer | National; Republican | 1817 | Incumbent re-elected. | ▌ ✓ Charles F. Mercer (National Republican) 100%; ▌William T. T. Mason (Jacksonian) 0.0% |
| Virginia 15 | Edward Lucas | Jacksonian | 1833 | Incumbent re-elected. | ▌ ✓ Edward Lucas (Jacksonian) 51.6%; ▌John R. Cooke (National Republican) 48.4% |
| Virginia 16 | James M. H. Beale | Jacksonian | 1833 | Incumbent re-elected. | ▌ ✓ James M. H. Beale (Jacksonian) 92.4%; ▌John Winston Jones (National Republican) 7.6% |
| Virginia 17 | Samuel M. Moore | National; Republican | 1833 | Incumbent lost re-election. Jacksonian gain. | ▌ ✓ Robert Craig (Jacksonian) 52.5%; ▌Samuel M. Moore (National Republican) 47.5% |
| Virginia 18 | John H. Fulton | Jacksonian | 1833 | Incumbent lost re-election as a National Republican. Jacksoninan hold. | ▌ ✓ George W. Hopkins (Jacksonian) 72.0%; ▌John H. Fulton (National Republican) 28.0% |
| Virginia 19 | William McComas | Jacksonian | 1833 | Incumbent re-elected as a National Republican. National Republican gain. | ▌ ✓ William McComas (National Republican) 55.1%; ▌William L. Smith (Jacksonian) 44.9% |
| Virginia 20 | John J. Allen | National; Republican | 1833 | Incumbent lost re-election. Jacksonian gain. | ▌ ✓ Joseph Johnson (Jacksonian) 46.8%; ▌John J. Allen (National Republican) 44.7%; ▌Lewis Maxwell (National Republican) 8.5% |
| Virginia 21 | Edgar C. Wilson | National; Republican | 1833 | Incumbent lost re-election. Jacksonian gain. | ▌ ✓ William S. Morgan (Jacksonian) 57.5%; ▌Edgar C. Wilson (National Republican) 42.5% |

== Non-voting delegates ==
| District | Incumbent | | | This race | |
| District | Delegate | Party | First elected | Results | Candidates |
|---|---|---|---|---|---|
| Arkansas Territory at-large | Ambrose H. Sevier | Jacksonian | 1828 (special) | Incumbent re-elected. | ▌ ✓ Ambrose H. Sevier (Jacksonian); [data missing] |
Florida Territory at-large
Michigan Territory at-large

== See also ==
- 1834 United States elections
  - List of United States House of Representatives elections (1824–1854)
  - 1834–35 United States Senate elections
- 23rd United States Congress
- 24th United States Congress

== Bibliography ==
- Dubin, Michael J. (March 1, 1998). United States Congressional Elections, 1788-1997: The Official Results of the Elections of the 1st Through 105th Congresses. McFarland and Company. ISBN 978-0786402830.
- Martis, Kenneth C. (January 1, 1989). The Historical Atlas of Political Parties in the United States Congress, 1789-1989. Macmillan Publishing Company. ISBN 978-0029201701.
- Moore, John L., ed. (1994). Congressional Quarterly's Guide to U.S. Elections (Third ed.). Congressional Quarterly Inc. ISBN 978-0871879967.
- "Party Divisions of the House of Representatives* 1789–Present". Office of the Historian, House of United States House of Representatives.
