= Jackson family of West Virginia =

The Jackson family is a family of politicians from the United States. Below is a list of members:

- George Jackson (1757–1831), Virginia House Delegate 1785–1791, U.S. Representative from Virginia 1795–1797 1799–1803, Ohio State Representative 1809–1812, Ohio State Senator 1817–1819. Father of John G. Jackson and Edward B. Jackson.
- Return J. Meigs Jr. (1764–1825), Chief Justice of the Ohio Supreme Court 1803–1804, Judge in Louisiana Territory, Judge in Michigan Territory, U.S. Senator from Ohio 1908–1910, Governor of Ohio 1810–1814, U.S. Postmaster General 1814–1823. Father-in-law of John G. Jackson.
  - John G. Jackson (1777–1825), Virginia Assemblyman 1811–1812, U.S. Representative from Virginia 1813–1817, U.S. District Court Judge in Virginia 1819–1825. Son of George Jackson.
  - Edward B. Jackson (1793–1826), Virginia House Delegate 1815–1818, Clerk of U.S. District Court in Virginia 1819, U.S. Representative from Virginia 1820–1823. Son of George Jackson.
  - James Madison (1751–1836), U.S. Representative from Virginia 1789–1797, U.S. Secretary of State 1801–1809, President of the United States 1809–1817. Brother-in-law of John G. Jackson.
    - John James Allen (1797–1871), Virginia State Senator 1828, U.S. Representative from Virginia 1833–1835, Virginia State Court Judge 1836. Son-in-law of John G. Jackson.
      - John Jay Jackson Jr. (1824–1907), Virginia Assemblyman 1851–1855, Judge of U.S. District Court in Virginia 1861–1864, District Court Judge in West Virginia 1864–1905. Grandson of John G. Jackson.
        - Henry Clay Allen (1838-1899).
      - James M. Jackson (1825–1901), Prosecuting Attorney of Wood County, Virginia; West Virginia House Delegate 1870–1871; delegate to the West Virginia Constitutional Convention 1872; U.S. Representative from West Virginia 1889–1890; Criminal Court Judge in Wood County, West Virginia 1891–1901. Grandson of John G. Jackson.
      - William Thomas Bland (1861–1928), Prosecuting Attorney of Atchison County, Kansas 1890–1892; Mayor of Atchison, Kansas 1894; Judge in Kansas 1896–1901; member of the Kansas City, Missouri Board of Education 1912–1918; U.S. Representative from Missouri 1919–1921. Grandson of John G. Jackson.
        - William Thomas Bland Jr. (1894-1990).
      - Jacob B. Jackson (1829–1893), Governor of West Virginia 1881–1885. Grandson of John G. Jackson.
      - John Curtiss Underwood (1809–1873), Judge of the United States District Court for the Eastern District of Virginia 1863–64, Judge of the United States District Court for the District of Virginia 1864–71, Judge of the United States District Court for the Eastern District of Virginia 1871–73. Grandson-in-law of Edward B. Jackson.

NOTE: James Madison was also second cousin of Kentucky Governor George Madison and U.S. President Zachary Taylor and second cousin thrice removed of Missouri Governor Elliot Woolfolk Major and Missouri legislator Edgar Bailey Woolfolk. John James Allen was also brother of U.S. Representative Robert Allen.

== See also ==
- List of United States political families
