= John Test =

American politician (1771–1849)

Member of the U.S. House of Representatives from 's 3rd district
- In office March 4, 1829 – March 3, 1831
- Preceded by: Oliver H. Smith
- Succeeded by: Johnathan McCarty
- In office March 4, 1823 – March 3, 1827
- Preceded by: District created
- Succeeded by: Oliver H. Smith

Personal details
- Born: 1781 Salem, Salem County, New Jersey, U.S.
- Died: October 9, 1849 (aged 67–68) Wayne County, Indiana, U.S.
- Resting place: Capitol Hill Cemetery
- Party: Democratic-Republican Party; National Republican Party

John Test (1781 – October 9, 1849) was a U.S. representative from Indiana.

John Test was born and raised near Salem, New Jersey. He moved to Fayette County, Pennsylvania, and operated Fayette Chance Furnace for several years. He moved to Cincinnati, and then to Brookville, Indiana, and operated a grist mill. He studied law. He was admitted to the bar and began practice in Brookville, Indiana. He held several local offices. He served as judge of the third district circuit 1816–1819.

Test was elected as a Jackson Republican to the Eighteenth Congress and reelected as an Adams candidate to the Nineteenth Congress (March 4, 1823 – March 3, 1827). He was an unsuccessful candidate for reelection in 1826 to the Twentieth Congress.

Test was elected as an Anti-Jacksonian to the Twenty-first Congress (March 4, 1829 – March 3, 1831). Presiding judge of the Indiana circuit court. He moved to Mobile, Alabama, and resumed the practice of law. He died near Cambridge City, Indiana, October 9, 1849. He was interred in Cambridge City, Indiana.

Test was the maternal grandfather of author and American Civil War Union Army Major General Lew Wallace, the son of Indiana lawyer and politician David Wallace and Test's daughter Esther. His daughter Mary was the wife of James Rariden, a fellow U.S. Representative from Indiana.

U.S. House of Representatives
Preceded by District created	Member of the U.S. House of Representatives from Indiana's 3rd congressional district 1823-1827	Succeeded by Oliver H. Smith
Preceded by Oliver H. Smith	Member of the U.S. House of Representatives from Indiana's 3rd congressional district 1829-1831	Succeeded by Johnathan McCarty
