= Tennessee's 13th congressional district =

- Obsolete district
- Created: 1830
- Eliminated: 1840
- Years active: 1833–1843

Tennessee's 13th congressional district was a district of the United States Congress in Tennessee. It was lost to redistricting in 1843. Its last representative was Christopher H. Williams.

== List of members representing the district ==
Member	Party	Years	Cong ress	Electoral history
District established March 4, 1833
William C. Dunlap (Bolivar)	Jacksonian	March 4, 1833 – March 3, 1837	23rd 24th	Elected in 1833. Re-elected in 1835. Lost re-election.
Christopher H. Williams (Lexington)	Whig	March 4, 1837 – March 3, 1843	25th 26th 27th	Elected in 1837. Re-elected in 1839. Re-elected in 1841. Retired.
District dissolved March 4, 1843
