= Jared Williams (Virginia politician) =

American politician (1766-1831)

Member of the U.S. House of Representatives from Virginia
- In office March 4, 1819 – March 4, 1825
- Preceded by: Henry S. Tucker (3rd); William S. Archer (17th)
- Succeeded by: William S. Archer (3rd); Alfred H. Powell (17th)
- Constituency: 3rd district (1819-23); 17th district (1823-25)

Member of the Virginia House of Delegates
- In office 1812–1817

Personal details
- Born: March 4, 1766 Montgomery County, Province of Maryland, British America
- Died: January 2, 1831 (aged 64) Newton, Virginia, U.S.
- Party: Democratic-Republican
- Profession: planter

Jared Williams (March 4, 1766 – January 2, 1831) was a U.S. representative from Virginia.

Born in Montgomery County in the Province of Maryland, Williams pursued classical studies. He engaged in agricultural pursuits. He served as member of the Virginia House of Delegates from 1812 to 1817.

Williams was elected to the Sixteenth, Seventeenth, and Eighteenth Congresses (March 4, 1819 – March 3, 1825). He died near Newton, Virginia, January 2, 1831.

== Electoral history ==
- 1819; Williams was elected to the U.S. House of Representatives with 68.32% of the vote, defeating fellow Democratic-Republican John Smith.
- 1821; Williams was re-elected with 63.33% of the vote, defeating fellow Democratic-Republican William Steinbergen.

== Sources ==
- United States Congress. "Jared Williams (id: W000510)". Biographical Directory of the United States Congress.

U.S. House of Representatives
Preceded by Henry S. Tucker	Member of the U.S. House of Representatives from Virginia's 3rd congressional district 1819–1823	Succeeded by William S. Archer
Preceded by William S. Archer	Member of the U.S. House of Representatives from Virginia's 17th congressional district 1823–1825	Succeeded by Alfred H. Powell
