= William Ross Allen =

American politician and lawyer (1869–1942)

Member of the Virginia House of Delegates from the Botetourt County district
- In office 1901–1902

Personal details
- Born: January 22, 1869 Beaverdam, Botetourt County, Virginia, U.S.
- Died: October 26, 1942 (aged 73) Lexington, Virginia, U.S.
- Resting place: Fairview Cemetery; Buchanan, Virginia, U.S.
- Party: Democratic
- Spouse: Eva B. Haney (m. 1896)
- Children: 2
- Parent: John J. Allen (father)
- Relatives: John J. Allen (grandfather)
- Education: Washington and Lee University School of Law (LLB)
- Occupation: Politician; lawyer

William Ross Allen (January 22, 1869 – October 26, 1942) was an American politician and lawyer from Virginia. He served as a member of the Virginia House of Delegates in 1901.

== Early life ==
William Ross Allen was born on January 22, 1869, in Beaverdam, Botetourt County, Virginia, to Elizabeth M. and John J. Allen. His father was a lawyer and member of the Virginia House of Delegates. His grandfather was judge John J. Allen. He studied at a private home school. He graduated from Washington and Lee University School of Law with a Bachelor of Laws in 1892.

== Career ==
In 1890, Allen worked as a farmer in Botetourt County. After graduating, he practiced law. In May 1895, Allen was elected commonwealth's attorney of Botetourt County. He was re-elected in May 1899 and November 1903. He served in that role for 16 years.

Allen served as a member of the Virginia House of Delegates in 1901. He served as chairman of Botetourt County's democratic committee for 15 years.

== Personal life ==
Allen married Eva B. Haney on June 17, 1896. They had two children.

Allen lived in Fincastle, Virginia. He died on October 26, 1942, at his home in Lexington. He was buried at Fairview Cemetery in Buchanan.
