= Henry C. Allen (Virginia politician) =

American politician

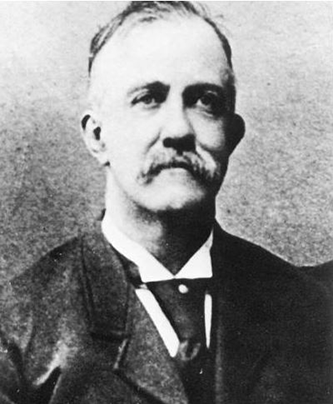
- Allen (c. 1875)

32nd Speaker of the Virginia House of Delegates
- In office 1877–1879
- Preceded by: J. Marshall Hanger
- Succeeded by: Benjamin W. Lacy

Member of the Virginia House of Delegates from Shenandoah County
- In office December 1, 1875 – December 2, 1879 Serving with Joseph B. Strayer, David S. Henkel
- Preceded by: Harrison Riddleberger
- Succeeded by: Joseph B. Strayer

Personal details
- Born: March 19, 1838 Beaver Dam, Botetourt County, Virginia, U.S.
- Died: October 31, 1889 (aged 51)
- Party: Democratic
- Spouse: Julia McKay Gatewood (m. 1867)
- Parent(s): John J. Allen; Mary Payne Allen
- Relatives: Robert Allen
- Education: University of Virginia
- Profession: farmer, lawyer

Military service
- Allegiance: Confederate States of America
- Branch/service: infantry
- Years of service: 1861-1862
- Battles/wars: Battle of Gettysburg

Henry Clay Allen (March 19, 1838 – October 31, 1889) was an American lawyer and politician in Virginia. He represented Shenandoah County in the Virginia House of Delegates, and served as that body's Speaker from 1877 until 1879.

== Early and family life ==
Henry C. Allen was a middle son born at Beaver Dam, Botetourt County, Virginia, to lawyer and former Congressman, then Judge John J. Allen. His uncle Robert Allen also was a Congressmen.

On January 24, 1867, he married Julia McKay Gatewood.

== Career ==
During the American Civil War, he, his brothers and cousins all enlisted in the Confederate States Army.

After the war, Allen returned to the Shenandoah Valley, where his grandfather had practiced law as well as served as a judge.

Voters elected him to represent Shenandoah County in the Virginia House of Delegates. When Democrat Grover Cleveland became president, Allen was the United States Attorney for the Western District of Virginia from 1885 until 1889.
