= Virginia's 17th congressional district =

1793–1843 US congressional district

Coordinates: 37°40′N 79°50′W

- Obsolete district
- Created: 1793
- Eliminated: 1843
- Years active: 1793–1843

Virginia's 17th congressional district is an obsolete congressional district. It was eliminated in 1843 after the 1840 U.S. census. Its last congressman was Alexander H. H. Stuart.

== History ==
Virginia's 17th congressional district was first formed in 1792. Although its initial geographic area was in northeastern Virginia, in the five decades before its demise after the 1840 census, it included areas in southeastern Virginia, southwestern Virginia and even briefly what became West Virginia after the American Civil War.

The first member of the house from the 17th district was Richard Bland Lee. The district population was 42,897 in 1790, and Lee represented what is today Arlington, Fairfax, Loudoun and Prince William Counties as well as the independent cities within the present boundaries of these counties.

In 1802 the district was redrawn to cover Brunswick, Lunenberg and Mecklenburg Counties in Virginia. To what extent modern Greensville County, Virginia was in the district is disputed between Martis and Parsons et al. To complicate the matter more Parsons et al. argue that Greensville County did not exist in 1803 while Thorndale and Dollarhide show it existing in that year. To confuse us even more Parsons et al. show on their map (p. 128) no Greensville County, while on p. 132 they list Greensville County with a population of over 6,000. The total population of the district was 43,898.

In 1812 the district was moved again this time to covering Chesterfield, Amelia, Powhatan and Goochland Counties. These included Colonial Heights and some of the southern and western portions of Richmond, Virginia. In the case of Richmond much of this was the area that was once in Manchester, Virginia. The 1810 census reported a population of 38,849 for this district, 61.1% of whom were African-Americans, primarily slaves.

In the 1822 redistricting the 17th district was moved westward in Virginia. It now incorporated Rockbridge County, Virginia, Alleghany County, Virginia, Botetourt County, Virginia, Montgomery County, Virginia and Giles County, Virginia. Alleghany County was formed in 1822 as the district was being organized. Most of the modern county of Craig in Virginia was in the district, although parts of this county as well as Montgomery and Giles counties were in the county of Monroe which is now in West Virginia. All of modern Roanoke County, Virginia and Floyd County, Virginia as well as half of Pulaski County, Virginia were in the districts boundaries. This gave it such modern independent cities as Clifton Forge, Salem, Roanoke and Buena Vista. The district also included portions of present Mercer County, West Virginia, Raleigh County, West Virginia, Wyoming County, West Virginia and Summers County, West Virginia and Fayette County, West Virginia. The district had a population of 38,788 of whom 18% were African-Americans. (Parsons, p. 284). Martis says the 17th district during this time consisted of Frederick County, Virginia and Shenandoah County, Virginia which Parsons et al. place in the 20th district. The two authors disagree on the placement of all the districts in Virginia numbered 15 and up during these years.

The 1842 redistricting was the first time that any area was retained in the 17th district during a redistricting. The new district was extended north to include Augusta County, Virginia but lost Giles County, Virginia in the south. Its population was now 63,464, 23.3% of whom were African-Americans.

In the 1843 redistricting. Virginia had lost population relative to the rest of the country and the 17th district was eliminated.

== List of members representing the district ==
Representative	Party	Term	Cong ress	Electoral history
District established March 4, 1793
Richard B. Lee (Chantilly)	Pro-Administration	March 4, 1793 – March 3, 1795	3rd	Redistricted from the 4th district and re-elected in 1793. Lost re-election.
Richard Brent (Stafford County)	Democratic-Republican	March 4, 1795 – March 3, 1799	4th 5th	Elected in 1795. Re-elected in 1797. Retired.
Leven Powell (Loudoun County)	Federalist	March 4, 1799 – March 3, 1801	6th	Elected in 1799. Lost re-election.
Richard Brent (Stafford County)	Democratic-Republican	March 4, 1801 – March 3, 1803	7th	Elected in 1801. Redistricted to the 7th district and lost re-election.
Thomas Claiborne (Brunswick County)	Democratic-Republican	March 4, 1803 – March 3, 1805	8th	Redistricted from the 8th district and re-elected in 1803. Retired.
John Claiborne (Brunswick)	Democratic-Republican	March 4, 1805 – October 9, 1808	9th 10th	Elected in 1805. Re-elected in 1807. Died.
Vacant		October 10, 1808 – November 6, 1808	10th	
Thomas Gholson, Jr. (Brunswick)	Democratic-Republican	November 7, 1808 – March 3, 1813	10th 11th 12th	Elected September 8, 1808 to finish Claiborne's term and seated November 7, 1808. Re-elected in 1809. Re-elected in 1811. Redistricted to the 18th district.
James Pleasants (Goochland)	Democratic-Republican	March 4, 1813 – December 14, 1819	13th 14th 15th 16th	Redistricted from the 16th district and re-elected in 1813. Re-elected in 1815. Re-elected in 1817. Re-elected in 1819. Resigned when Elected U.S. senator.
Vacant		December 14, 1819 – January 2, 1820	16th	
William S. Archer (Amelia)	Democratic-Republican	January 3, 1820 – March 3, 1823	16th 17th	Elected to finish Pleasants's term. Re-elected in 1821. Redistricted to the 3rd district.
Jared Williams (Newton)	Democratic-Republican	March 4, 1823 – March 3, 1825	18th	Redistricted from the 3rd district and re-elected in 1823. Retired.
Alfred H. Powell (Winchester)	Anti-Jacksonian	March 4, 1825 – March 3, 1827	19th	Elected in 1825. Lost re-election.
Robert Allen (Mount Jackson)	Jacksonian	March 4, 1827 – March 3, 1833	20th 21st 22nd	Elected in 1827. Re-elected in 1829. Re-elected in 1831. Retired.
Samuel M. Moore (Lexington)	Anti-Jacksonian	March 4, 1833 – March 3, 1835	23rd	Elected in 1833. Lost re-election.
Robert Craig (Christiansburg)	Jacksonian	March 4, 1835 – March 3, 1837	24th 25th 26th	Elected in 1835. [data missing]
Robert Craig (Christiansburg)	Democratic	March 4, 1837 – March 3, 1841	24th 25th 26th	Elected in 1837. Re-elected in 1839. Retired.
Alexander H. H. Stuart (Staunton)	Whig	March 4, 1841 – March 3, 1843	27th	Elected in 1841. Lost re-election.
District dissolved March 4, 1843

== Sources ==
- Parsons, Stanley B., William W. Beach and Dan Harmann. United States Congressional Districts, 1788-1841 (Westport: Greenwood Press, 1978)
- Thorndale, William and Dollarhide, William. Map Guide to the U.S. Federal Censuses, 1790-1920. (Baltimore: Genealogical Publishing Co., 1987)
- http://quickfacts.census.gov/qfd/maps/virginia_map.html
- Martis, Kenneth C. (1989). The Historical Atlas of Political Parties in the United States Congress. New York: Macmillan Publishing Company.
- Martis, Kenneth C. (1982). The Historical Atlas of United States Congressional Districts. New York: Macmillan Publishing Company.
- Congressional Biographical Directory of the United States 1774–present
