= Alfred H. Powell =

American politician (1781–1831)

Member of the U.S. House of Representatives from Virginia's 17th district
- In office March 4, 1825 – March 3, 1827
- Preceded by: Jared Williams
- Succeeded by: Robert Allen

Member of the Virginia Senate from Frederick, Berkeley, Hampshire, Hardy, and Jefferson Counties
- In office 1812–1818
- Preceded by: Lewis Wolfe
- Succeeded by: Constituency abolished

Personal details
- Born: March 6, 1781 Loudoun County, Province of Virginia, British America
- Died: August 3, 1831 (aged 50) Winchester, Virginia, U.S.
- Party: Democratic-Republican
- Parent: Leven Powell (father)
- Education: Princeton College
- Profession: Politician; lawyer

Alfred Harrison Powell (March 6, 1781 – August 3, 1831) was a U.S. representative from Virginia.

== Early life ==
Alfred H. Powell was born on March 6, 1781, in Loudoun County, Virginia, to Sarah (née Harrison) and Leven Powell. He graduated from Princeton College. He studied law with Charles Simms of Alexandria and was admitted to the bar.

== Career ==
In 1800, Powell commenced a law practice in Winchester, Virginia. He also served as member of the Virginia Senate from 1812 to 1819. He was elected as an Adams candidate to the Nineteenth Congress (March 4, 1825 – March 3, 1827). He served as delegate to the Virginia Constitutional Convention of 1829-1830.

== Personal life ==
Powell died on August 3, 1831, in Winchester, Virginia.

== Sources ==
U.S. House of Representatives
Preceded by Jared Williams	Member of the U.S. House of Representatives from Virginia's 17th congressional district 1825–1827	Succeeded by Robert Allen
