= Christopher Harris Williams =

American politician

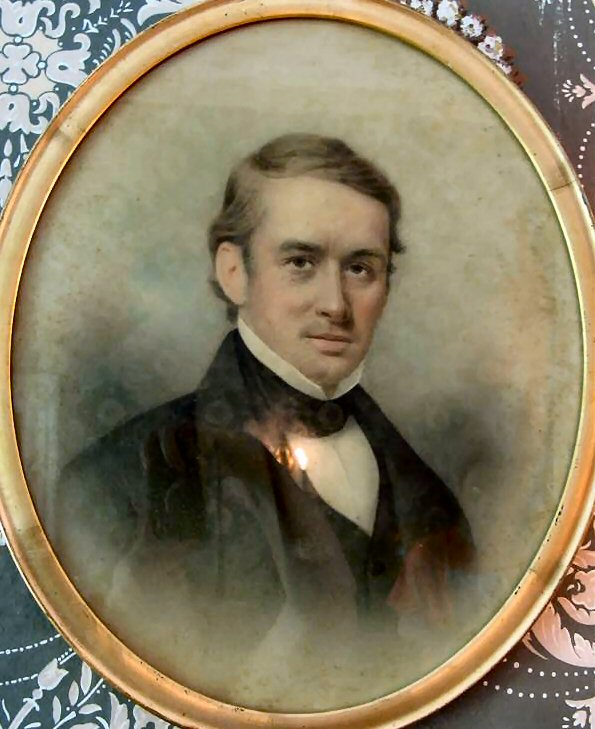

Member of the U.S. House of Representatives from Tennessee's 13th district
- In office March 4, 1837 – March 3, 1843
- Preceded by: William C. Dunlap
- Succeeded by: District eliminated

Member of the U.S. House of Representatives from Tennessee's 11th district
- In office March 4, 1849 – March 3, 1853
- Preceded by: William T. Haskell
- Succeeded by: District eliminated

Personal details
- Born: December 18, 1798 Hillsborough, North Carolina, U.S.
- Died: November 27, 1857 (aged 58) Lexington, Tennessee, U.S.
- Party: Whig
- Spouse: Jane Allison Williams
- Children: Mary Ann Williams; Ede Harris Williams; James Allison Williams; Duke Williams; Christopher Harris Williams Jr.
- Education: University of North Carolina
- Profession: lawyer; politician

Christopher Harris Williams (December 18, 1798 – November 27, 1857) was an American politician who represented Tennessee's United States House of Representatives, thirteenth and United States House of Representatives, eleventh districts in the United States House of Representatives.

== Biography ==
Williams was born near Hillsborough, North Carolina, on December 18, 1798. He pursued an academic course and attended the University of North Carolina at Chapel Hill. He studied law, was admitted to the bar about 1820, and practiced law. He married Jane Allison on December 9, 1819.

== Career ==
Williams was elected as a Whig to the Twenty-fifth, Twenty-sixth, and Twenty-seventh Congresses by Tennessee's thirteenth district. He served from March 4, 1837, to March 3, 1843. He was an unsuccessful candidate for re-election in 1842 to the Twenty-eighth Congress.

After the number of districts held by Tennessee had been reduced, Williams was elected by Tennessee's eleventh district to the Thirty-first and Thirty-second Congresses. He served from March 4, 1849, to March 3, 1853. He was not a candidate for renomination in 1852. He resumed the practice of law in Lexington, Tennessee.

== Death ==
Williams died in Lexington on November 27, 1857. He is interred at Lexington Cemetery.

Williams' son and namesake (born 1830) was a Colonel in the Confederate army in the American Civil War who was killed at the Battle of Shiloh in 1862. His grandson was John Sharp Williams, who also served in the American House and Senate.

U.S. House of Representatives
Preceded by William C. Dunlap	Member of the U.S. House of Representatives from Tennessee's 13th congressional district 1837–1843	Succeeded by District eliminated
Preceded by William T. Haskell	Member of the U.S. House of Representatives from Tennessee's 11th congressional district 1849–1853	Succeeded by District eliminated
