= Robert Allen (Virginia politician) =

American politician (1794–1859)

Member of the U.S. House of Representatives from Virginia's 17th district
- In office March 4, 1827 – March 3, 1833
- Preceded by: Alfred H. Powell
- Succeeded by: Samuel M. Moore

Member of the Virginia Senate from Shenandoah and Rockingham Counties
- In office 1821-1826
- Preceded by: Daniel Bryan
- Succeeded by: Moses Walton

Personal details
- Born: July 30, 1794 Woodstock, Virginia, US
- Died: December 30, 1859 (aged 65) Mount Pleasant, Essex County, Virginia, US
- Party: Democratic-Republican
- Education: Dickinson College; Washington College
- Profession: farmer, lawyer

Robert Allen (July 30, 1794 – December 30, 1859) was an American lawyer, slaveholder, farmer and politician from Woodstock, Virginia. He represented Virginia in the United States House of Representatives from 1827 to 1833, after representing the central Shenandoah Valley in the Virginia Senate.

== Early and family life ==
Allen was born in 1794 in Woodstock, the county seat of Shenandoah County, Virginia to attorney James Allen (1762-1844) and his wife, the former Jane Steele (1758-1826), daughter of Rev. John Steele (1715-1779; the "Fighting Parson" of Carlisle, Cumberland County, Pennsylvania). After some education at home, Allen traveled up the Shenandoah Valley and started college at Dickinson College in Carlisle, Pennsylvania. After two years he transferred to Washington College (now Washington and Lee) in Lexington, Virginia where he graduated in 1815. He returned to the family farm and read law, was admitted to the bar and established a law practice in Woodstock.

He married Mary Ann Walkinshaw, who died in 1818, and then Frances Rebecca Harvey (1806-1873), the daughter of Matthew Harvey, who bore four sons and four daughters, including James Walkinshaw Allen (1829-1862), a VMI graduate who died as acting brigadier general of the Stonewall Brigade at the Battle of Gaines Mill, and CSA Col. Robert Clatworthy Allen (1834-1863) who died in the Battle of Gettysburg. Their brother Donald Allen (1848-1908) also fought in the unit before becoming a railroad man and Staunton's city engineer.

== Career ==
After admission to the Virginia bar, Allen served as prosecuting attorney for Shenandoah County. He also farmed, and in the 1830 census owned 6 male slaves and 6 female slaves.

After Daniel Bryan accepted a federal post as postmaster in Alexandria, Virginia, voters from Shenandoah and adjoining Rockingham counties elected Allen to the Virginia state Senate in 1820, and re-elected him so that he served (part-time) from 1821 until 1826. In 1826 he was elected to the U.S. Congress as a Jacksonian. He would serve there for six years, winning re-election twice. Allen moved to Bedford County, Virginia and resumed farming. He owned 36 slaves in the 1840 census, although only 14 of those were engaged in agriculture (as well as 10 boys and 10 girls under age 10). His brother John James Allen also served in the Congress before becoming a Virginia judge.

== Death and legacy ==
Allen died in 1859 at Mount Pleasant in Essex County, Virginia and is buried in the Longwood Cemetery in Bedford.

U.S. House of Representatives
Preceded by Alfred H. Powell	Member of the U.S. House of Representatives from Virginia's 17th congressional district 1827–1833	Succeeded by Samuel M. Moore
