= Jonathan McCarty (politician) =

American politician (1795–1852)

Member of the U.S. House of Representatives from Indiana
- In office March 4, 1831 – March 3, 1837
- Preceded by: John Test (3rd); District established (5th)
- Succeeded by: John Carr (3rd); James Rariden (5th)
- Constituency: 3rd district (1831-33); 5th district (1833-37)

Personal details
- Born: August 3, 1795 Culpeper County, Virginia, U.S.
- Died: May 30, 1852 (aged 56) Keokuk, Iowa, U.S
- Party: Anti-Jacksonian
- Other political affiliations: Jacksonian (before 1835)

Jonathan McCarty (August 3, 1795 – March 30, 1852) was a U.S. representative from Indiana.

Born in Culpeper County, Virginia, McCarty attended the public schools. He moved to Indiana in 1803 with his father, who settled in Franklin County. He engaged in mercantile pursuits. He served as member of the State house of representatives in 1818. He moved to Connersville, Indiana. He served as clerk of the county court 1819–1827.

McCarty was elected as a Jacksonian to the Twenty-second and Twenty-third Congresses and reelected as an Anti-Jacksonian to the Twenty-fourth Congress (March 4, 1831 – March 3, 1837). He was an unsuccessful candidate for reelection in 1836 to the Twenty-fifth Congress. He served as presidential elector on the Whig ticket in 1840. He moved to Keokuk, Iowa, where he died March 30, 1852. He was interred in Oakland Cemetery.

U.S. House of Representatives
Preceded by John Test	Member of the U.S. House of Representatives from Indiana's 3rd congressional district 1831–1833	Succeeded by John Carr
Preceded by District created	Member of the U.S. House of Representatives from Indiana's 5th congressional district 1833–1837	Succeeded by James Rariden
