= Alexander Hugh Holmes Stuart =

American politician (1807–1891)

Alexander Stuart
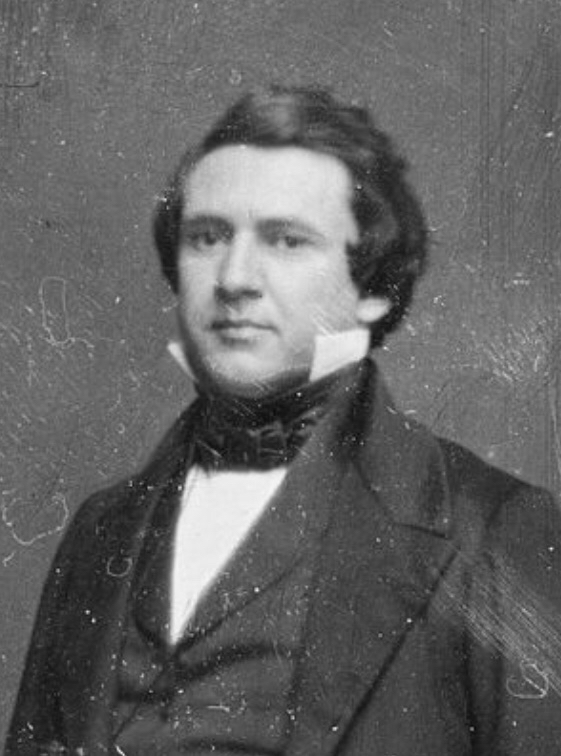
- Portrait c. 1850

3rd United States Secretary of the Interior
- In office September 14, 1850 – March 7, 1853
- President: Millard Fillmore; Franklin Pierce
- Preceded by: Thomas McKennan
- Succeeded by: Robert McClelland

Member of the U.S. House of Representatives from Virginia's 17th district
- In office March 4, 1841 – March 3, 1843
- Preceded by: Robert Craig
- Succeeded by: Constituency abolished

Member of the Virginia House of Delegates from Augusta County
- In office January 1, 1874 – December 5, 1877
- Preceded by: Charles S. Roler
- Succeeded by: John Echols
- In office December 5, 1836 – December 2, 1839
- Preceded by: Robert S. Brooke
- Succeeded by: Franklin McCue

Member of the Virginia Senate from Augusta County
- In office December 7, 1857 – December 2, 1861
- Preceded by: Clement R. Harris
- Succeeded by: Bolivar Christian

Personal details
- Born: Alexander Hugh Holmes Stuart; April 2, 1807 Staunton, Virginia, U.S.
- Died: February 13, 1891 (aged 83) Staunton, Virginia, U.S.
- Party: Whig
- Spouse: Frances Baldwin
- Children: 8
- Education: College of William & Mary; University of Virginia (BA)

Alexander Hugh Holmes Stuart (April 2, 1807 – February 13, 1891) was a Virginia lawyer and American political figure associated with several political parties. Stuart served in both houses of the Virginia General Assembly (1836–1838, 1857–1861 and 1874–1877), as a U.S. Congressman (1841–1843), and as the Secretary of the Interior (1850–1853). Despite opposing Virginia's secession and holding no office after finishing his term in the Virginia Senate during the American Civil War, after the war he was denied a seat in Congress. Stuart led the Committee of Nine, which attempted to reverse the changes brought by Reconstruction. He also served as rector of the University of Virginia.

== Early years ==
Stuart was born in Staunton, Virginia, one of three sons of judge Archibald Stuart, a protege of Thomas Jefferson, and his wife Eleanor (nee Briscoe).

After education by private tutors, Stuart attended the College of William and Mary. He studied law under John Tayloe Lomax and graduated from the University of Virginia in Charlottesville before marrying his cousin Frances Cornelia Baldwin in 1833. They had six daughters and three sons.

== Career ==
Stuart was admitted to the Virginia bar in 1828 and soon became active in the National Republican Party. He supported the unsuccessful campaign of Henry Clay in the 1832 U.S. Presidential Election.

=== Delegate and Congressman ===
Augusta County voters first elected Stuart as one of two men representing them in the Virginia House of Delegates in 1836. Re-elected twice as a Whig to what were then single-year terms (and a position which is still part-time), Stuart served on the Committee for Courts of Justice and also advocated internal improvements (the James River Canal as well as railroads). Although recommendations in his critical report concerning deficiencies in such improvements were not adopted, during 1838 Stuart became a junior member of the Committee on Roads and Internal Navigation.

In 1840 Stuart won election as a Whig to the 27th Congress, as the incumbent Jacksonian Democrat Robert Craig declined to run for re-election. He defeated Democrat and future Virginia governor James McDowell in that election. Stuart served on the committee concerning the Navy Department, and beginning in February 1842 on the Committee on Foreign Affairs. He was one of only two Southern representatives to support former President John Quincy Adams when Adams proposed to end the rule forbidding petitions against slavery. After President William Henry Harrison's death, Stuart criticized the new president, fellow Virginian John Tyler for opposing a new national bank, and also supported a tariff to protect American (and Virginia) manufacturers. In 1843, post-census redistricting combined his district with Virginia's 11th congressional district held by John Minor Botts; Democrat William Taylor defeated Stuart and won election to the 28th Congress. However, Stuart continued politically active, serving as a presidential elector for the Whig ticket in both 1844 (when it lost) and 1848 (when it won).

Stuart also resumed his legal practice full time. Beginning in 1849, he was one of the attorneys defending the new Wheeling Suspension Bridge, following a lawsuit in the United States Supreme Court brought by Edwin M. Stanton and Cornelius Darragh on behalf of the State of Pennsylvania and Pittsburgh, Pennsylvania interests that complained about obstruction of the Ohio River.

From 1850, Stuart served as United States Secretary of the Interior under new President Millard Fillmore for three years. That Department had been founded on the suggestion of one of his fellow counsel in the Wheeling Bridge case, and neither of his predecessors had lasted long. The department which consolidated the United States General Land Office, the Office of Indian Affairs, and the U.S. Patent Office also worked to resolve the boundary with Mexico. Stuart didn't change the culture of political patronage, but at least gave rules and standards to the political appointments and removed some of the administrative chaos until resigning as President Fillmore's term ended in 1853.

As the Whig Party disintegrated in 1852, Stuart declined to become its candidate in the U.S. Senate. Instead, he aligned himself with the nativist Know Nothing Party, which some criticized as secretly working against slavery. When Virginia's Democratic governor Henry A. Wise criticized the Know Nothings, Stuart (as "Madison") published twelve long letters on the "American Question" in the Richmond Whig and Public Advertiser and later as a combined pamphlet. Neither endorsing nor opposing slavery, Stuart praised American Party's proposals to deny some immigrants rights accorded native-born Americans.

=== Prelude to secession ===
Later that year, Augusta County voters again elected Stuart to the Virginia General Assembly, this time to the Virginia Senate, where he served from 1857 through 1861. He was the senior senator on the committee to investigate John Brown's Raid against the arsenal in Harper's Ferry (then still in Virginia) in October 1859. The committee's report condemned abolitionist agitation, and recommended strengthening local militia units, as well as achieving commercial independence from the North by encouraging Virginia's domestic manufactures.

By 1860, Stuart owned nine enslaved persons. At a speech before the Central Agricultural Society of Virginia, Stuart fully accepted slavery as in the best interest of Southern agricultural prosperity and argued it benefited the Northern economy as well as that emancipation would lead to violence.

In the 1860 U.S. Presidential Election, Stuart supported the Constitutional Union Party and its candidate, John Bell (a former Whig who had represented Tennessee in the U.S. Congress). Bell won a majority of Virginia votes, although he ultimately received fewer votes than either major party candidate. As the United States divided into two hostile camps after President Abraham Lincoln's election, seven lower Southern states began establishing the Confederacy beginning in December 1860. Augusta County voter elected Unionists Stuart, John Brown Baldwin (his brother-in-law) and George Baylor to represent them in the Virginia Secession Convention of 1861. He voted with the anti-secession majority on the initial vote on April 4. Stuart, William B. Preston and George W. Randolph as a special Virginia delegation traveled to Washington, D.C., and met President Lincoln on April 12 after the surrender of Fort Sumter. Finding Lincoln firm in his resolve to hold the federal forts in the South, the three men returned to Richmond, Virginia on April 15. Two days later, the secession resolution again came before the convention. All three Augusta County delegates again voted against it, but it passed and was ratified by voters. On June 14, 1861, Stuart was among those signing the ceremonial secession ordinance. Stuart then proposed amendments to Virginia's Constitution of 1851, which he thought too democratic. Stuart blamed unrestrained democratic practices in free states for Lincoln's election and also criticized the North's free public schools. However, Virginia voters, on March 13, 1862, rejected the committee's proposal, which would have removed the popular election of the governor and reorganized the judiciary.

=== American Civil War ===
After Virginia seceded, Stuart declined to hold any Confederate or Virginia office after his state senate term ended, and he did not support the Wheeling Convention, which ultimately led to the creation of West Virginia. However, he supported relief for Virginia's soldiers. Furthermore, two relatives served as Confederate officers: his brother-in-law John Brown Baldwin and his cousin, J. E. B. Stuart. A. H. H. Stuart also specifically declined appointment to a peace commission in March 1864.

=== Post-war ===
About a month after Virginia's surrender at Appomattox Courthouse, on May 8, 1865, Stuart chaired a mass meeting in Staunton, which adopted resolutions asking the U.S. Army's protection and declaring the populace not in rebellion. Stuart also took oaths of allegiance to the United States and to the loyal government of Virginia. Because he had never held Confederate office, Stuart was eligible for election and was again elected U.S. Representative in 1865. However, despite presenting credentials as a member-elect to the 39th Congress in 1865, he was denied a seat as were other newly elected Southern delegates, because Virginia was not yet readmitted to the Union, pending its adoption of a new state constitution outlawing slavery, among other measures.

As the University of Virginia commencement speaker in June 1866, Stuart lamented the end of Old Virginia. He also opposed Congressional Reconstruction. In 1866, Stuart was a delegate to the National Convention of Conservatives at Philadelphia. In 1867, Stuart criticized the Virginia Constitutional Convention of 1868, which was elected with universal suffrage and included black delegates. Shortly after it convened, Stuart became chairman of the Committee of Nine, which lobbied the new president Ulysses S. Grant, and managed to secure separate votes for the new state constitution, which passed overwhelmingly, and anti-Confederate measures, which failed. Thus, Virginia was restored to the Union in 1870. Augusta County voters again elected Stuart to represent them in the Virginia General Assembly in 1873, and he served on the Committee on Finance. His re-election was contested, but he won the second vote and served from 1874 to 1877.

Stuart also served as rector of the University of Virginia from 1874 to 1882 and from 1886 to 1887, during which he came to accept public education but realized the funding problems (the institution received no funding from 1882 to 1884, and all its officers were forced out). He also served as president of the Virginia Historical Society from 1881 to his death, published a booklet concerning the Committee of Nine at its request, and continued his legal practice.

== Death and legacy ==
Stuart died at his home in Staunton in 1891 (six years following his wife's death). His papers are held by the Virginia Historical Society and the University of Virginia, which has made some available online. He was the last surviving member of Fillmore's cabinet.

His son in law, John M. P. Atkinson (husband of Frances Peyton Stuart) was the tenth president of Hampden–Sydney College from 1857 to 1883.

His home at Staunton, the Stuart House, was added to the National Register of Historic Places in 1972.

U.S. House of Representatives
Preceded by Robert Craig	Member of the U.S. House of Representatives from Virginia's 17th congressional district March 4, 1841 – March 3, 1843	Succeeded by District eliminated
Political offices
Preceded by Thomas M. T. McKennan	U.S. Secretary of the Interior; Served under: Millard Fillmore; September 14, 1850 – March 7, 1853	Succeeded by Robert McClelland
