= Robert Craig (Virginia politician) =

American politician

Member of the U.S. House of Representatives from Virginia's 17th district
- In office March 4, 1835 – March 3, 1841
- Preceded by: Samuel M. Moore
- Succeeded by: Alexander H. H. Stuart

Chairman of the House Committee on Revolutionary Claims
- In office 1837–1840
- Preceded by: Henry A. P. Muhlenberg
- Succeeded by: Hiland Hall

Member of the U.S. House of Representatives from Virginia's 20th district
- In office March 4, 1829 – March 3, 1833
- Preceded by: John Floyd
- Succeeded by: John J. Allen

Member of the Virginia House of Delegates from Montgomery County
- In office 1825-1828
- In office 1817-1818

Personal details
- Born: 1792 Christiansburg, Virginia
- Died: November 25, 1852 (aged 59–60) "Green Hill," Salem, Virginia
- Party: Democratic Party (1825-1828, 1835-onward); Jacksonian (1829-1832)
- Education: Lewisburg Academy; Washington College
- Profession: planter

Robert Craig (1792 – November 25, 1852) was a politician and longtime member of the Virginia House of Delegates and United States House of Representatives, serving many terms in both bodies. Craig County, Virginia is named in his honor.

== Biography ==
Born near Christiansburg, Virginia, Craig attended Washington College (now Washington and Lee University) in Lexington, Virginia. He graduated from Lewisburg Academy in Greenbrier County (now West Virginia).

After graduating, Craig engaged in agriculture, before being elected to and serving in the Virginia House of Delegates in 1817 and 1818. He worked as a member of the Virginia Board of Public Works from 1820–1823, before being elected again to the Virginia House, serving from 1825–1829.

Craig was elected as a Jacksonian Democrat to the Twenty-first and Twenty-second Congresses (March 4, 1829 – March 3, 1833). He was an unsuccessful candidate for reelection in 1832, so he resumed agricultural pursuits.

Craig was elected again as a Jacksonian to the Twenty-fourth Congress and reelected as a Democrat to the Twenty-fifth and Twenty-sixth Congresses (March 4, 1835 – March 3, 1841). He served as chairman of the "Committee on Revolutionary Claims" from 1837 to 1840, but did not seek renomination in 1840.

Craig moved to Roanoke County, Virginia in 1842 and resumed agricultural pursuits. He was elected again to the State House of delegates, serving one term, from 1850–1852.

He died on his plantation, "Green Hill," near Salem, Virginia, on November 25, 1852. He was interred in the family burying ground there.

== Sources ==
- United States Congress. "Robert Craig (id: C000859)". Biographical Directory of the United States Congress.

U.S. House of Representatives
Preceded by John Floyd	Member of the U.S. House of Representatives from Virginia's 20th congressional district 1829–1833	Succeeded by John J. Allen
Preceded by Samuel M. Moore	Member of the U.S. House of Representatives from Virginia's 17th congressional district 1835–1841	Succeeded by Alexander H. H. Stuart
