= William S. Archer =

American politician (1789–1855)

William Segar Archer
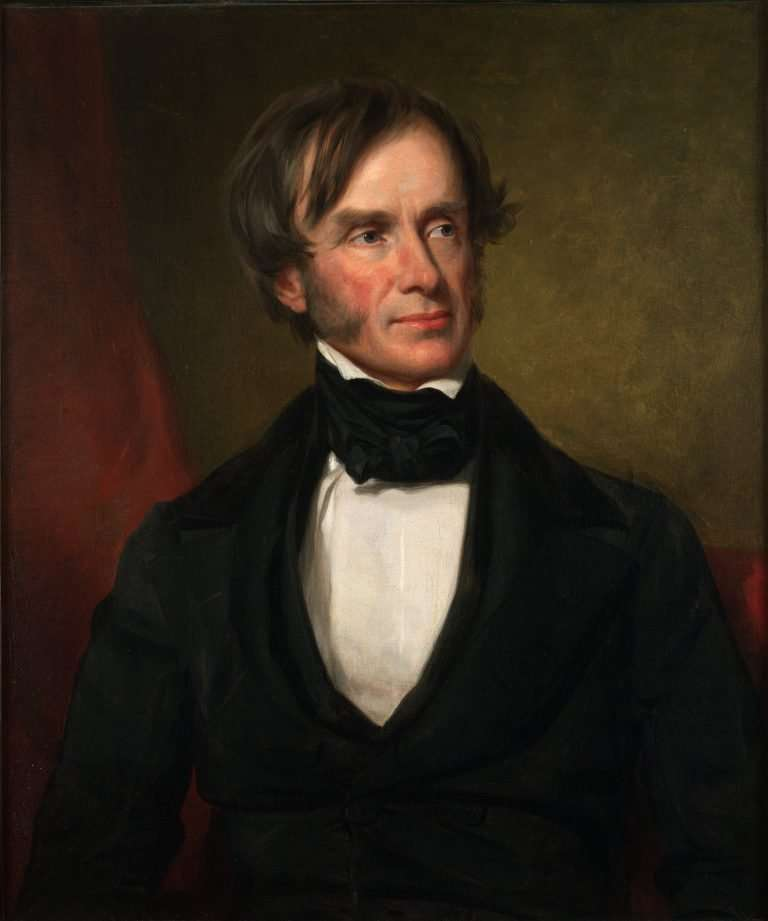

United States Senator from Virginia
- In office March 4, 1841 – March 4, 1847 Serving with William C. Rives; Isaac S. Pennybacker; James Murray Mason
- Preceded by: William H. Roane
- Succeeded by: Robert M. T. Hunter

Chairman of the Senate Foreign Relations Committee
- In office December 5, 1842 – March 3, 1845
- Preceded by: William C. Rives
- Succeeded by: William Allen

Member of the U.S. House of Representatives from Virginia
- In office January 3, 1820 – March 4, 1835
- Preceded by: James Pleasants (17th); Jared Williams (3rd)
- Succeeded by: Jared Williams (17th); John W. Jones (3rd)
- Constituency: 17th district (1820-23); 3rd district (1823-35)

Chairman of the House Foreign Affairs Committee
- In office March 4, 1829 – March 3, 1835 Serving with Rodophil Jeter

Member of the Virginia House of Delegates representing Amelia County
- In office 1812–1814 Serving with James Robertson, Jr.
- Preceded by: James P. Cocke
- Succeeded by: John Lane

Member of the Virginia House of Delegates representing Amelia County
- In office 1818–1821
- Preceded by: John Lane
- Succeeded by: John Peyton Bolling

Personal details
- Born: March 5, 1789 Amelia County, Virginia, US
- Died: March 28, 1855 (aged 66) Amelia County, Virginia, US
- Resting place: Archer (Red Lodge) Cemetery, Amelia County, Virginia, US
- Party: Democratic-Republican
- Other political affiliations: Democrat; Whig
- Education: College of William & Mary
- Profession: Politician, Lawyer

William Segar Archer (March 5, 1789 – March 28, 1855) was a politician, planter and lawyer from Amelia County, Virginia who served several times in the Virginia House of Delegates, as well as in the United States House of Representatives and the United States Senate (1841 to 1847).

== Early and family life ==
Born at "The Lodge" (a/k/a "Red Lodge") in Amelia County, Virginia to the former Elizabeth Eggleston (d. 1826) and her husband John Archer (1746-1812), William Segar Archer received a private education appropriate to his class and graduated from The College of William & Mary in 1806. His father (as well as his younger brother) died in 1812. Meanwhile, Archer read law, possibly with his uncle Joseph Eggleston (1754-1811), a former Revolutionary War soldier from Middlesex County, who then moved to Amelia County, where he became a planter and politician, and the local justice of the peace. Another Revolutionary War soldier uncle who moved to Amelia County was Lt. Richard Tanner Archer.

Archer married and had a daughter, who did not survive him. At his death, he was survived by several sisters, and an illegitimate son.

== Career ==
Admitted to the bar in 1810, Archer began a private legal practice in Amelia and neighboring Powhatan Counties. He also operated a plantation in Amelia County using enslaved labor. In the 1820 federal census, John R. Archer (possibly his father, although he had died in 1812) owned 51 enslaved people, and William S. Archer owned 32 slaves. In the 1830 federal census, William S. Archer owned 25 enslaved people, which number grew to 50 enslaved people by the 1840 federal census, and 68 enslaved people in the 1850 U.S. Federal Census. By his death, Archer owned 88 enslaved individuals, and land both in Amelia County and in Mississippi.

Four times Archer won election to represent Amelia County (part time) as one of its two delegates in the Virginia House of Delegates between 1812 and 1819, although he also once failed to win re-election during that period. One historian reading his speeches considered his political stance undemocratic and noted that, despite his campaigns, Amelia County voters refused to elect him as one of their representatives to the Virginia constitutional conventions in 1829, nor in 1850.

Archer won election to the United States House of Representatives to fill the vacancy caused by the resignation of James Pleasants (whom the Virginia General Assembly had elected to the U.S. Senate). He had a conservative, states' rights bent and soon introduced a resolution denying that Congress had the constitutional authority to authorize the Bank of the United States. Archer won reelection in 1820, 1824, 1826, 1828, 1830 and 1832, thus served from 1820 to 1835. In Congress, Archer rose to chairman of the Committee on Foreign Affairs from 1829 to 1835, before being defeated for reelection in 1834 by Democrat John Winston Jones. In 1824 Archer supported the unsuccessful Presidential candidacy of Virginia-born Democratic Republican William H. Crawford. In the next Presidential election, Archer supported Andrew Jackson, but broke with the Jacksonian Democrats after Jackson high-handedly removed government deposits from the Bank of the United States. Archer then joined the Whig Party, although he did not agree with its leader Henry Clay's support of internal improvement.

Whigs gained power in the Virginia General Assembly by 1840, and on the second ballot Archer was elected to the United States Senate over the incumbent, William H. Roane. Archer served one full term, from 1841 to 1847. There, he became chairman of the Committee on Foreign Relations from 1841 to 1845 and of the Committee on Naval Affairs from 1841 to 1843. Issues of territorial expansion and slavery became important during his tenure. Archer supported President Polk's effort to end British claims to the Oregon Territory, but not the annexation of Texas (fearing it would lead to war with Mexico, as happened). Archer also became a key member of the committee who drafted the Missouri Compromise. However, he did not have enough support in the Virginia General Assembly to win reelection. Legislators elected Robert M. T. Hunter in 1846, over both Archer and then-Virginia governor and future Confederate general Extra Billy Smith.

Archer resumed his legal practice, as well as managed his plantations for the remaining near decade of his life. He also served as a trustee of Hampden-Sydney College from 1820 through 1839.

== Death and legacy ==
Archer died at "The Lodge" in Amelia County on March 28, 1855. He was interred in the family cemetery there, and left his large estate, including 2000 acres of land and 2500 books, as well as enslaved people and other property, to his three sisters, who decided to split it into four parts and thus provide for Archer's illegitimate son, William Segar Archer Work.

== Elections ==
- 1823; Archer was re-elected unopposed.
- 1825; Archer was re-elected unopposed.
- 1827; Archer was re-elected unopposed.
- 1829; Archer was re-elected unopposed.
- 1831; Archer was re-elected unopposed.
- 1833; Archer was re-elected unopposed.

U.S. House of Representatives
Preceded by James Pleasants	Member of the U.S. House of Representatives from Virginia's 17th congressional district 1820–1823	Succeeded by Jared Williams
Preceded by Jared Williams	Member of the U.S. House of Representatives from Virginia's 3rd congressional district 1823–1835	Succeeded by John W. Jones
U.S. Senate
Preceded by William H. Roane	U.S. senator (Class 2) from Virginia; 1841–1847; Served alongside: William C. Rives, Isaac S. Pennybacker, James M. Mason	Succeeded by Robert M. T. Hunter
Political offices
Preceded by Edward Everett; Massachusetts	Chairman of House Foreign Affairs Committee; 1829–1834	Succeeded by James Moore Wayne; Georgia
Preceded by William C. Rives; Virginia	Chairman of Senate Foreign Relations Committee; 1842–1845	Succeeded by William Allen; Ohio
