= William Claiborne Dunlap =

American politician

Member of the U.S. House of Representatives from Tennessee's 13th district
- In office March 4, 1833 – March 3, 1837
- Preceded by: District created
- Succeeded by: Christopher H. Williams

Personal details
- Born: February 25, 1798 Knoxville, Tennessee, US
- Died: November 16, 1872 (aged 74) Memphis, Tennessee, US
- Party: Jacksonian
- Education: Maryville College
- Profession: lawyer; politician

William Claiborne Dunlap (February 25, 1798 – November 16, 1872) was an American politician who represented Tennessee's United States House of Representatives, Tennessee thirteenth district in the United States House of Representatives.

== Biography ==
Dunlap was born in Knoxville, Tennessee on February 25, 1798. His twin brother was Hugh White Dunlap. He attended the Ebenezer Academy and Maryville College in Maryville, Tennessee, from 1813 to 1817. He studied law, was admitted to the bar, and commenced his law practice in Knoxville in 1819. He was one of a large family of Hugh Dunlap and Susanna Gilliam, the sons all lawyers.

== Career ==
After serving in the Indian campaign in 1818 and 1819, Dunlap moved to Bolivar, Tennessee in 1828. He also held a commission in the United States Volunteers in 1830.

Dunlap was elected as a Jacksonian to the Twenty-third and Twenty-fourth Congresses. He served from March 4, 1833 to March 3, 1837. He was an unsuccessful candidate for re-election in 1836 to the Twenty-fifth Congress.

Dunlap was a judge of the Eleventh Circuit Court of Tennessee from 1840 to 1849, when he resigned and resumed practicing law. He served as a member of the Tennessee Senate elected in 1851, 1853, and 1857. He served in the Tennessee House of Representatives from 1857 to 1859.

After he helped create Sequatchie County, TN, the county seat, Coop's Creek was renamed Dunlap in his honor. Dunlap Street near the medical center in Memphis, TN is also named for him.

== Death ==
Dunlap died near Memphis, Tennessee on November 16, 1872 (age 74 years, 265 days). He is interred in Elmwood Cemetery in Memphis, Tennessee.

U.S. House of Representatives
| Preceded by District created | Member of the U.S. House of Representatives from Tennessee's 13th congressional district 1833–1837 | Succeeded by Christopher H. Williams |
