= Samuel M. Moore =

American politician (1796–1875)

Member of the U.S. House of Representatives from Virginia's 17th district
- In office March 4, 1833 – March 3, 1835
- Preceded by: Robert Allen
- Succeeded by: Robert Craig

Personal details
- Born: February 9, 1796 Philadelphia, Pennsylvania
- Died: September 17, 1875 (aged 79) Lexington, Virginia
- Party: National Republican Party
- Education: Washington College

Samuel McDowell Moore (February 9, 1796 – September 17, 1875) was a U.S. representative from Virginia, son of Andrew Moore.

== Biography ==
Born in Philadelphia, Pennsylvania, Moore attended the public schools and Washington College (now Washington and Lee University), Lexington, Virginia, where he settled after leaving college. He served as member of the State house of delegates 1825–1833. He served as member of the Virginia constitutional convention of 1829.

Moore was elected as an Anti-Jacksonian to the Twenty-third Congress (March 4, 1833 – March 3, 1835). He was an unsuccessful candidate for reelection in 1834 to the Twenty-fourth Congress. He was again a member of the house of delegates in 1836 and 1837. He served in the State senate 1845–1847. He served as delegate to the secession convention in 1861. During the Civil War, he served in the Confederate States Army. After the war, he resumed the practice of his profession. He died in Lexington, Virginia, on September 17, 1875, and was interred in Lexington Cemetery.

== Sources ==
- United States Congress. "Samuel M. Moore (id: M000917)". Biographical Directory of the United States Congress.

U.S. House of Representatives
Preceded by Robert Allen	Member of the U.S. House of Representatives from Virginia's 17th congressional district 1833–1835	Succeeded by Robert Craig
