= James Rariden =

American politician

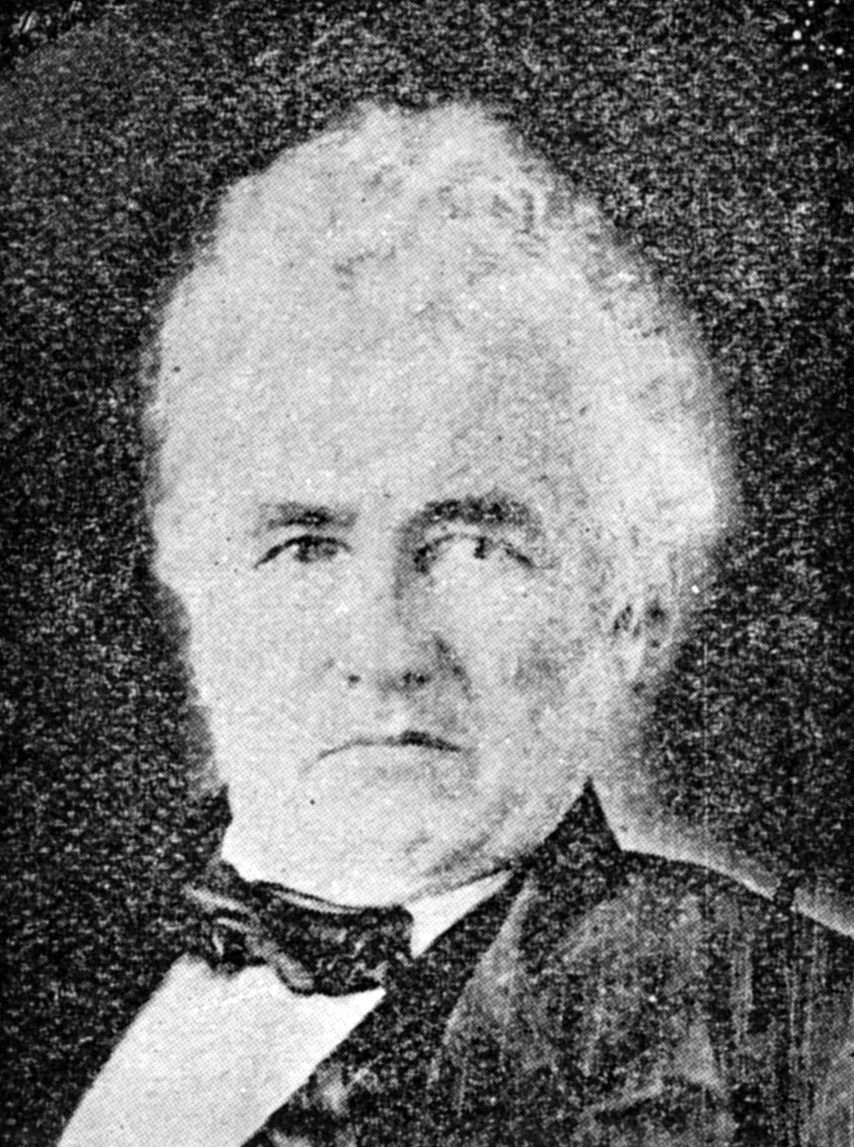
- Rariden from Who-When-What Book, 1900

Member of the U.S. House of Representatives from Indiana's 5th district
- In office March 4, 1837 – March 3, 1841
- Preceded by: Johnathan McCarty
- Succeeded by: Andrew Kennedy

Personal details
- Born: February 14, 1795 near Cynthiana, Kentucky, U.S.
- Died: October 20, 1856 (aged 61) Cambridge City, Indiana, U.S.
- Party: Whig
- Occupation: Attorney, politician

James Rariden (February 14, 1795 – October 20, 1856) was an American lawyer and politician who served two terms as a U.S. representative from Indiana, from 1837 to 1841.

== Biography ==
Born near Cynthiana, Kentucky, Rariden received a limited schooling. He moved to Brookville, Indiana, and later to Salisbury, where he served as deputy clerk of court and studied law.

He was admitted to the bar in 1818 and began practice in Centerville, Indiana, in 1820. He served as prosecuting attorney 1822–1825.

=== Political career ===
He served in the State senate in 1823 and as a member of the State house of representatives in 1829, 1830, 1832, and 1833.

Rariden was elected as a Whig to the Twenty-fifth and Twenty-sixth Congresses (March 4, 1837 – March 3, 1841).

=== Later career and death ===
In 1846, he moved to Cambridge City, Indiana. He served as delegate to the State constitutional convention in 1850.

He died in Cambridge City, Indiana on October 20, 1856, and was interred in Riverside Cemetery.

U.S. House of Representatives
Preceded by Johnathan McCarty	Member of the U.S. House of Representatives from Indiana's 5th congressional district 1837-1841	Succeeded by Andrew Kennedy
