= John J. Allen (judge) =

American judge (1797–1871)

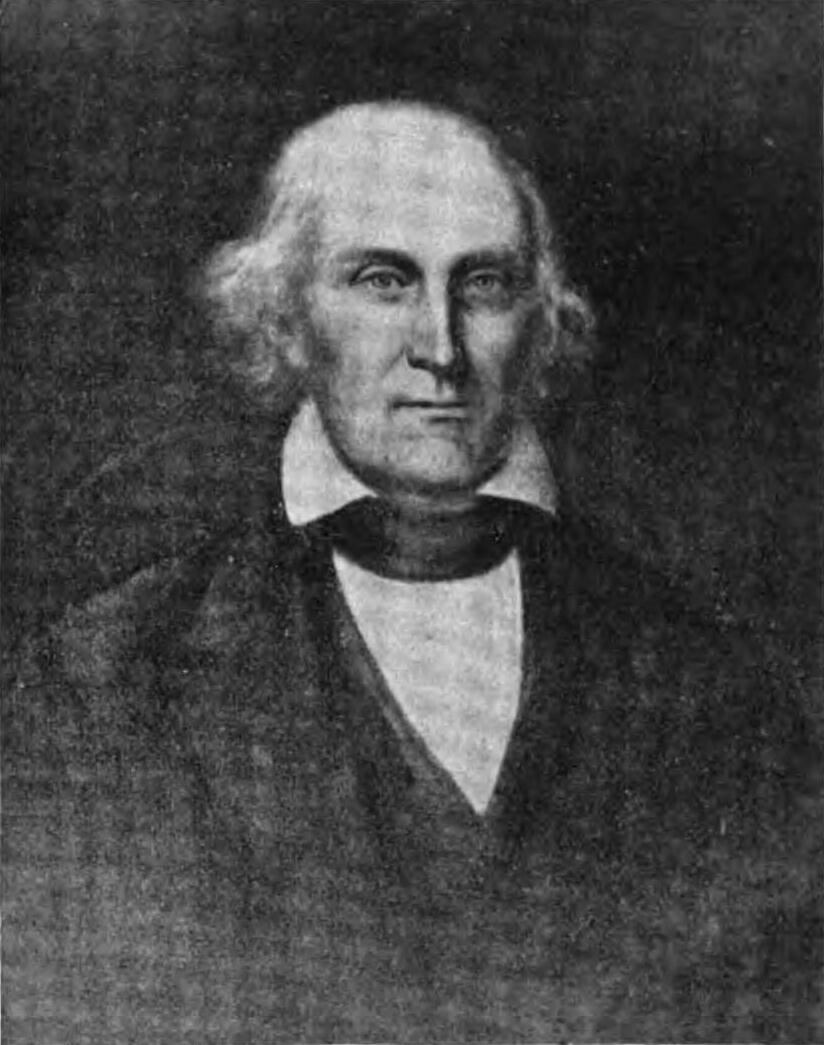

President of the Virginia Supreme Court of Appeals
- In office January 6, 1851 – February 8, 1865
- Preceded by: Henry St. George Tucker, Sr.
- Succeeded by: Richard C. L. Moncure

Justice of the Virginia Supreme Court
- In office January 6, 1841–February 8, 1865

Member of the U.S. House of Representatives from Virginia's 20th district
- In office December 2, 1833 – March 3, 1835
- Preceded by: Robert Craig
- Succeeded by: Joseph Johnson

Member of the Virginia Senate representing Kanawha, Logan, Mason, Cabell, Randolph, Harrison, Lewis and Wood Counties
- In office December 1, 1828-December 5, 1830
- Preceded by: Joseph L. Fry
- Succeeded by: John McWhorter

Personal details
- Born: September 25, 1797 Woodstock, Virginia, U.S.
- Died: September 18, 1871 (aged 73) Botetourt County, Virginia, U.S.
- Resting place: Lauderdale Cemetery; Botetourt County, Virginia, U.S.
- Party: National Republican
- Spouse: Mary Elizabeth Payne Jackson (m. 1824)
- Children: 9, including John J. Jr. and Henry C.
- Relatives: William Ross Allen (grandson)
- Education: Washington College, Dickinson College
- Profession: Lawyer; politician; judge

John James Allen (September 25, 1797 – September 18, 1871) was a Virginia slave owner, lawyer, judge and politician. He served in the Virginia Senate, the 23rd United States Congress, and for 25 years as judge and President of the Virginia Supreme Court of Appeals. He supported Virginia's secession during the American Civil War, and all his surviving sons joined the Confederate States Army, the two youngest dying in the conflict.

== Early and family life ==
Allen was born at Woodstock, Shenandoah County, Virginia to lawyer James Allen (1762-1844) and his wife, the former Jane Steele (1758-1826), daughter of Rev. John Steele (1715-1779; the "Fighting Parson" of Carlisle, Cumberland County, Pennsylvania). His father would represent Shenandoah county in the Virginia House of Delegates as well as become the local circuit court judge. John J. Allen studied at Washington College in Lexington, Virginia and at Dickinson College in Carlisle, Pennsylvania, then read law with his father.

He married Mary Elizabeth Payne Jackson (daughter of John George and Mary Payne Jackson) on November 11, 1824. Their children included Mary J. Allen Watts (1825-1855), Jane S. Arthur (1831- ), John J. Allen Jr. (1831-1898), Eveline S. Allen Wood (1833-1909), Robert Edwin Allen (1836-1883), Henry Clay Allen (1838-1889), James Madison Allen (1840-1959), George Jackson Allen (1843-1862), and Baldwin Allen (1845-1862).

== Career ==
Allen was admitted to the Virginia bar in 1818, and opened his first office at Campbell Courthouse, Virginia in 1819. He soon moved to Clarksburg, the seat of Harrison County where he practiced law in the surrounding counties for seventeen years, after 1830 (until his election as judge) in partnership with Gideon D. Camden, who also later became a circuit judge.

In 1828, voters from the trans-Appalachian counties of Kanawha, Logan, Mason, Cabell, Randolph, Harris, Lewis and Wood elected Allen to represent them in the Virginia Senate. However, he did not serve a full four year term, because the Virginia Constitutional Convention of 1829-1830 led to a reorganization of districts. His growing district was split, and William McComas came to represent Kanawha, Mason, Cabell, Logan and Nicholas Counties, and John McWhorter representing Harrison, Lewis and Wood Counties (although both members continued to serve on a part-time basis).

In 1832, Allen successfully ran for election to the U.S. Congress, and was a member of the 23rd United States Congress, serving for a year from March 4, 1833 to March 4, 1835.

In the 1834 election, voters in Harrison, Lewis and Preston counties elected Allen as their Commonwealth’s Attorney (state prosecutor). He served for about a year before Virginia's General Assembly elected him as Judge for the seventeenth Circuit in 1836. Allen then moved to Botetourt County where he held his first court.

In December 1840, the Virginia General Assembly elected Judge Allen to the Supreme Court of Appeals. In 1851 his fellow judges elected him as the court's President during another reorganization.

== Prelude and American Civil War ==
After Abraham Lincoln's election in November 1860, Judge Allen called a mass meeting in Botetourt County on December 10, 1860. He presented a resolution that he had drafted extolling Virginia's contributions to the nation's founding and condemning the north for "pharisaical fanaticism" concerning slavery and urged calling a convention to consider secession. The meeting overwhelmingly approved his document (except for 2 unnamed dissenters), which came to be called the "Botetourt Resolutions."

Allen's sons (and his eldest daughter's widower husband) volunteered for Confederate army service. While the three eldest Allen boys and their brother in law William Watts survived the conflict (and Henry Clay Allen survived the Battle of Gettysburg), the year 1862 proved disastrous for the family. Capt. John J. Allen St. lost an arm as a result of a wound sustained at the Battle of Malvern Hill, Master sergeant George Jackson Allen died in the Seven Days' Battle and Private Baldwin Allen died of typhoid fever after his artillery unit was assigned to Tennessee.

== Death and legacy ==
Allen resigned from the Court in April 1865 and retired to private life at his home, Beaverdam, near Fincastle, the Botetourt County seat. He was buried at Lauderdale Cemetery in Botetourt County after dying in 1871. Nearly three years later, his eldest son, John J. Allen Jr., won election as Botetourt County's delegate. Though he served but a single term, his middle brother Henry Clay Allen began the first of his four terms representing the family's ancestral Shenandoah County in 1875. John James Allen would then follow his father's path and become a circuit judge in Botetourt County for the rest of his career, and H.C. Allen would become the body's speaker in 1877-1879 before becoming a judge in Shenandoah county. His grandson William Ross Allen also served as a state delegate.

U.S. House of Representatives
Preceded by Robert Craig	Member of the U.S. House of Representatives from Virginia's 20th congressional district 1833–1835	Succeeded by Joseph Johnson
