= Virginia's congressional delegations =

These are tables of congressional delegations from Virginia to the United States Senate and United States House of Representatives. Virginia's current U.S. senators are Democrats Mark Warner (serving since 2009) and Tim Kaine (serving since 2013). Virginia is allotted 11 seats in the U.S. House of Representatives; currently, 6 seats are held by Democrats and 5 seats are held by Republicans.

The current dean of the Virginia delegation is Representative Bobby Scott (VA-3), having served in the House since 1993.

== United States Senate ==
Current U.S. senators from Virginia
Virginia CPVI (2025): D+3	Class I senator	Class II senator
Virginia CPVI (2025): D+3	Tim Kaine (Junior senator) (Richmond)	Mark Warner (Senior senator) (Alexandria)
Party	Democratic	Democratic
Incumbent since	January 3, 2013	January 3, 2009

Class I senator	Congress	Class II senator
William Grayson (AA)	1st (1789–1791)	Richard Henry Lee (AA)
John Walker (PA)	1st (1789–1791)	Richard Henry Lee (AA)
James Monroe (AA)	1st (1789–1791)	Richard Henry Lee (AA)
James Monroe (AA)	2nd (1791–1793)	Richard Henry Lee (AA)
James Monroe (AA)	2nd (1791–1793)	John Taylor (AA)
James Monroe (AA)	3rd (1793–1795)	John Taylor (AA)
Stevens Thomson Mason (AA)	3rd (1793–1795)	Henry Tazewell (AA)
Stevens Thomson Mason (DR)	4th (1795–1797)	Henry Tazewell (DR)
Stevens Thomson Mason (DR)	5th (1797–1799)	Henry Tazewell (DR)
Stevens Thomson Mason (DR)	5th (1797–1799)	vacant
Stevens Thomson Mason (DR)	6th (1799–1801)	Wilson Cary Nicholas (DR)
Stevens Thomson Mason (DR)	7th (1801–1803)	Wilson Cary Nicholas (DR)
Stevens Thomson Mason (DR)	8th (1803–1805)	Wilson Cary Nicholas (DR)
John Taylor (DR)	8th (1803–1805)	Wilson Cary Nicholas (DR)
Abraham B. Venable (DR)	8th (1803–1805)	Andrew Moore (DR)
William Branch Giles (DR)	8th (1803–1805)	Andrew Moore (DR)
Andrew Moore (DR)	8th (1803–1805)	William Branch Giles (DR)
Andrew Moore (DR)	9th (1805–1807)	William Branch Giles (DR)
Andrew Moore (DR)	10th (1807–1809)	William Branch Giles (DR)
Richard Brent (DR)	11th (1809–1811)	William Branch Giles (DR)
Richard Brent (DR)	12th (1811–1813)	William Branch Giles (DR)
Richard Brent (DR)	13th (1813–1815)	William Branch Giles (DR)
James Barbour (DR)	13th (1813–1815)	William Branch Giles (DR)
James Barbour (DR)	14th (1815–1817)	Armistead T. Mason (DR)
James Barbour (DR)	15th (1817–1819)	John Wayles Eppes (DR)
James Barbour (DR)	16th (1819–1821)	John Wayles Eppes (DR)
James Barbour (DR)	16th (1819–1821)	James Pleasants (DR)
James Barbour (DR)	17th (1821–1823)	James Pleasants (DR)
James Barbour (DR)	17th (1821–1823)	John Taylor (DR)
James Barbour (DR)	18th (1823–1825)	John Taylor (DR)
James Barbour (DR)	18th (1823–1825)	Littleton Waller Tazewell (DR)
James Barbour (J)	19th (1825–1827)	Littleton Waller Tazewell (J)
vacant	19th (1825–1827)	Littleton Waller Tazewell (J)
John Randolph (J)	19th (1825–1827)	Littleton Waller Tazewell (J)
John Tyler (J)	20th (1827–1829)	Littleton Waller Tazewell (J)
John Tyler (J)	21st (1829–1831)	Littleton Waller Tazewell (J)
John Tyler (J)	22nd (1831–1833)	Littleton Waller Tazewell (J)
John Tyler (J)	22nd (1831–1833)	William Cabell Rives (J)
John Tyler (NR)	23rd (1833–1835)	William Cabell Rives (J)
John Tyler (NR)	23rd (1833–1835)	Benjamin W. Leigh (NR)
John Tyler (NR)	24th (1835–1837)	Benjamin W. Leigh (NR)
William Cabell Rives (J)	24th (1835–1837)	Richard E. Parker (J)
William Cabell Rives (D)	25th (1837–1839)	Richard E. Parker (D)
William Cabell Rives (D)	25th (1837–1839)	William H. Roane (D)
vacant	26th (1839–1841)	William H. Roane (D)
William Cabell Rives (W)	27th (1841–1843)	William S. Archer (W)
William Cabell Rives (W)	28th (1843–1845)	William S. Archer (W)
Isaac S. Pennybacker (D)	29th (1845–1847)	William S. Archer (W)
James M. Mason (D)	29th (1845–1847)	William S. Archer (W)
James M. Mason (D)	30th (1847–1849)	Robert M. T. Hunter (D)
James M. Mason (D)	31st (1849–1851)	Robert M. T. Hunter (D)
James M. Mason (D)	32nd (1851–1853)	Robert M. T. Hunter (D)
James M. Mason (D)	33rd (1853–1855)	Robert M. T. Hunter (D)
James M. Mason (D)	34th (1855–1857)	Robert M. T. Hunter (D)
James M. Mason (D)	35th (1857–1859)	Robert M. T. Hunter (D)
James M. Mason (D)	36th (1859–1861)	Robert M. T. Hunter (D)
James M. Mason (D)	37th (1861–1863)	Robert M. T. Hunter (D)
Waitman T. Willey (U)	37th (1861–1863)	John S. Carlile (U)
Lemuel J. Bowden (U)	38th (1863–1865)	John S. Carlile (U)
vacant	38th (1863–1865)	John S. Carlile (U)
vacant	39th (1865–1867)	vacant
vacant	40th (1867–1869)	vacant
vacant	41st (1869–1871)	vacant
John F. Lewis (R)	41st (1869–1871)	John W. Johnston (D)
John F. Lewis (R)	42nd (1871–1873)	John W. Johnston (D)
John F. Lewis (R)	43rd (1873–1875)	John W. Johnston (D)
Robert E. Withers (D)	44th (1875–1877)	John W. Johnston (D)
Robert E. Withers (D)	45th (1877–1879)	John W. Johnston (D)
Robert E. Withers (D)	46th (1879–1881)	John W. Johnston (D)
William Mahone (RA)	47th (1881–1883)	John W. Johnston (D)
William Mahone (RA)	48th (1883–1885)	Harrison H. Riddleberger (RA)
William Mahone (RA)	49th (1885–1887)	Harrison H. Riddleberger (RA)
John W. Daniel (D)	50th (1887–1889)	Harrison H. Riddleberger (RA)
John W. Daniel (D)	51st (1889–1891)	John S. Barbour Jr. (D)
John W. Daniel (D)	52nd (1891–1893)	John S. Barbour Jr. (D)
John W. Daniel (D)	52nd (1891–1893)	Eppa Hunton (D)
John W. Daniel (D)	53rd (1893–1895)	Eppa Hunton (D)
John W. Daniel (D)	54th (1895–1897)	Thomas S. Martin (D)
John W. Daniel (D)	55th (1897–1899)	Thomas S. Martin (D)
John W. Daniel (D)	56th (1899–1901)	Thomas S. Martin (D)
John W. Daniel (D)	57th (1901–1903)	Thomas S. Martin (D)
John W. Daniel (D)	58th (1903–1905)	Thomas S. Martin (D)
John W. Daniel (D)	59th (1905–1907)	Thomas S. Martin (D)
John W. Daniel (D)	60th (1907–1909)	Thomas S. Martin (D)
John W. Daniel (D)	61st (1909–1911)	Thomas S. Martin (D)
Claude A. Swanson (D)	61st (1909–1911)	Thomas S. Martin (D)
Claude A. Swanson (D)	62nd (1911–1913)	Thomas S. Martin (D)
Claude A. Swanson (D)	63rd (1913–1915)	Thomas S. Martin (D)
Claude A. Swanson (D)	64th (1915–1917)	Thomas S. Martin (D)
Claude A. Swanson (D)	65th (1917–1919)	Thomas S. Martin (D)
Claude A. Swanson (D)	66th (1919–1921)	Thomas S. Martin (D)
Claude A. Swanson (D)	66th (1919–1921)	Carter Glass (D)
Claude A. Swanson (D)	67th (1921–1923)	Carter Glass (D)
Claude A. Swanson (D)	68th (1923–1925)	Carter Glass (D)
Claude A. Swanson (D)	69th (1925–1927)	Carter Glass (D)
Claude A. Swanson (D)	70th (1927–1929)	Carter Glass (D)
Claude A. Swanson (D)	71st (1929–1931)	Carter Glass (D)
Claude A. Swanson (D)	72nd (1931–1933)	Carter Glass (D)
Harry F. Byrd (D)	73rd (1933–1935)	Carter Glass (D)
Harry F. Byrd (D)	74th (1935–1937)	Carter Glass (D)
Harry F. Byrd (D)	75th (1937–1939)	Carter Glass (D)
Harry F. Byrd (D)	76th (1939–1941)	Carter Glass (D)
Harry F. Byrd (D)	77th (1941–1943)	Carter Glass (D)
Harry F. Byrd (D)	78th (1943–1945)	Carter Glass (D)
Harry F. Byrd (D)	79th (1945–1947)	Carter Glass (D)
Harry F. Byrd (D)	79th (1945–1947)	Thomas G. Burch (D)
Harry F. Byrd (D)	79th (1945–1947)	A. Willis Robertson (D)
Harry F. Byrd (D)	80th (1947–1949)	A. Willis Robertson (D)
Harry F. Byrd (D)	81st (1949–1951)	A. Willis Robertson (D)
Harry F. Byrd (D)	82nd (1951–1953)	A. Willis Robertson (D)
Harry F. Byrd (D)	83rd (1953–1955)	A. Willis Robertson (D)
Harry F. Byrd (D)	84th (1955–1957)	A. Willis Robertson (D)
Harry F. Byrd (D)	85th (1957–1959)	A. Willis Robertson (D)
Harry F. Byrd (D)	86th (1959–1961)	A. Willis Robertson (D)
Harry F. Byrd (D)	87th (1961–1963)	A. Willis Robertson (D)
Harry F. Byrd (D)	88th (1963–1965)	A. Willis Robertson (D)
Harry F. Byrd (D)	89th (1965–1967)	A. Willis Robertson (D)
Harry F. Byrd Jr. (D)	89th (1965–1967)	A. Willis Robertson (D)
Harry F. Byrd Jr. (D)	89th (1965–1967)	William Spong Jr. (D)
Harry F. Byrd Jr. (D)	90th (1967–1969)	William Spong Jr. (D)
Harry F. Byrd Jr. (D)	91st (1969–1971)	William Spong Jr. (D)
Harry F. Byrd Jr. (I)	92nd (1971–1973)	William Spong Jr. (D)
Harry F. Byrd Jr. (I)	93rd (1973–1975)	William L. Scott (R)
Harry F. Byrd Jr. (I)	94th (1975–1977)	William L. Scott (R)
Harry F. Byrd Jr. (I)	95th (1977–1979)	William L. Scott (R)
Harry F. Byrd Jr. (I)	95th (1977–1979)	John Warner (R)
Harry F. Byrd Jr. (I)	96th (1979–1981)	John Warner (R)
Harry F. Byrd Jr. (I)	97th (1981–1983)	John Warner (R)
Paul Trible (R)	98th (1983–1985)	John Warner (R)
Paul Trible (R)	99th (1985–1987)	John Warner (R)
Paul Trible (R)	100th (1987–1989)	John Warner (R)
Chuck Robb (D)	101st (1989–1991)	John Warner (R)
Chuck Robb (D)	102nd (1991–1993)	John Warner (R)
Chuck Robb (D)	103rd (1993–1995)	John Warner (R)
Chuck Robb (D)	104th (1995–1997)	John Warner (R)
Chuck Robb (D)	105th (1997–1999)	John Warner (R)
Chuck Robb (D)	106th (1999–2001)	John Warner (R)
George Allen (R)	107th (2001–2003)	John Warner (R)
George Allen (R)	108th (2003–2005)	John Warner (R)
George Allen (R)	109th (2005–2007)	John Warner (R)
Jim Webb (D)	110th (2007–2009)	John Warner (R)
Jim Webb (D)	111th (2009–2011)	Mark Warner (D)
Jim Webb (D)	112th (2011–2013)	Mark Warner (D)
Tim Kaine (D)	113th (2013–2015)	Mark Warner (D)
Tim Kaine (D)	114th (2015–2017)	Mark Warner (D)
Tim Kaine (D)	115th (2017–2019)	Mark Warner (D)
Tim Kaine (D)	116th (2019–2021)	Mark Warner (D)
Tim Kaine (D)	117th (2021–2023)	Mark Warner (D)
Tim Kaine (D)	118th (2023–2025)	Mark Warner (D)
Tim Kaine (D)	119th (2025–2027)	Mark Warner (D)
Tim Kaine (D)	120th (2027–2029)	Mark Warner (D)

== U.S. House of Representatives ==
=== Current members ===
Current U.S. representatives from Virginia
District	Member (Residence)	Party	Incumbent since	CPVI (2025)	District map
1st	Rob Wittman (Montross)	Republican	December 11, 2007	R+3	
2nd	Jen Kiggans (Virginia Beach)	Republican	January 3, 2023	EVEN	
3rd	Bobby Scott (Newport News)	Democratic	January 3, 1993	D+18	
4th	Jennifer McClellan (Richmond)	Democratic	March 7, 2023	D+17	
5th	John McGuire (Manakin Sabot)	Republican	January 3, 2025	R+6	
6th	Ben Cline (Fincastle)	Republican	January 3, 2019	R+12	
7th	Eugene Vindman (Dale City)	Democratic	January 3, 2025	D+2	
8th	Don Beyer (Alexandria)	Democratic	January 3, 2015	D+26	
9th	Morgan Griffith (Salem)	Republican	January 3, 2011	R+22	
10th	Suhas Subramanyam (Brambleton)	Democratic	January 3, 2025	D+6	
11th	James Walkinshaw (Wakefield)	Democratic	September 9, 2025	D+18	

=== 1789 – 1793: 10 seats ===
Congress	District									
Congress	1st	2nd	3rd	4th	5th	6th	7th	8th	9th	10th
1st (1789–1791)	Alexander; White (PA)	John Brown (AA)	Andrew; Moore (AA)	Richard Bland; Lee (PA)	James; Madison (AA)	Isaac; Coles (AA)	John; Page (AA)	Josiah; Parker (AA)	Theodorick; Bland (AA)	Samuel; Griffin (PA)
1st (1789–1791)	Alexander; White (PA)	John Brown (AA)	Andrew; Moore (AA)	Richard Bland; Lee (PA)	James; Madison (AA)	Isaac; Coles (AA)	John; Page (AA)	Josiah; Parker (AA)	William Branch; Giles (AA)	Samuel; Griffin (PA)
2nd (1791–1793)	Alexander; White (PA)	John Brown (AA)	Andrew; Moore (AA)	Richard Bland; Lee (PA)	James; Madison (AA)	Abraham B. Venable (AA)	John; Page (AA)	Josiah; Parker (AA)	William Branch; Giles (AA)	Samuel; Griffin (AA)
2nd (1791–1793)	Alexander; White (PA)	Apportioned to Kentucky	Andrew; Moore (AA)	Richard Bland; Lee (PA)	James; Madison (AA)	Abraham B. Venable (AA)	John; Page (AA)	Josiah; Parker (AA)	William Branch; Giles (AA)	Samuel; Griffin (AA)

=== 1793 – 1803: 19 seats ===
Congress
3rd
(1793–1795)
4th
(1795–1797)
5th
(1797–1799)
6th
(1799-1801)
7th
(1801–1803)

District
1st	2nd	3rd	4th	5th	6th	7th	8th	9th	10th	11th	12th	13th	14th	15th	16th	17th	18th	19th
Robert; Rutherford (AA)	Andrew; Moore (AA)	Joseph; Neville (AA)	Francis; Preston (AA)	George; Hancock (PA)	Isaac; Coles (AA)	Abraham B. Venable (AA)	Thomas; Claiborne (AA)	William Branch; Giles (AA)	Carter Bassett; Harrison (AA)	Josiah; Parker (PA)	John; Page (AA)	Samuel; Griffin (PA)	Francis; Walker (AA)	James; Madison (AA)	Anthony; New (AA)	Richard Bland; Lee (PA)	John; Nicholas (AA)	John; Heath (AA)
Robert; Rutherford (DR)	Andrew; Moore (DR)	George; Jackson (DR)	Francis; Preston (DR)	George; Hancock (F)	Isaac; Coles (DR)	Abraham B. Venable (DR)	Thomas; Claiborne (DR)	William Branch; Giles (DR)	Carter Bassett; Harrison (DR)	Josiah; Parker (F)	John; Page (DR)	John; Clopton (DR)	Samuel; Jordan; Cabell (DR)	James; Madison (DR)	Anthony; New (DR)	Richard; Brent (DR)	John; Nicholas (DR)	John; Heath (DR)
Daniel; Morgan (F)	David; Holmes (DR)	James; Machir (F)	Abram; Trigg (DR)	John Johns; Trigg (DR)	Matthew; Clay (DR)	Abraham B. Venable (DR)	Thomas; Claiborne (DR)	William Branch; Giles (DR)	Carter Bassett; Harrison (DR)	Josiah; Parker (F)	Thomas; Evans (F)	John; Clopton (DR)	Samuel; Jordan; Cabell (DR)	John; Dawson (DR)	Anthony; New (DR)	Richard; Brent (DR)	John; Nicholas (DR)	Walter; Jones (DR)
Daniel; Morgan (F)	David; Holmes (DR)	James; Machir (F)	Abram; Trigg (DR)	John Johns; Trigg (DR)	Matthew; Clay (DR)	Abraham B. Venable (DR)	Thomas; Claiborne (DR)	Joseph; Eggleston (DR)	Carter Bassett; Harrison (DR)	Josiah; Parker (F)	Thomas; Evans (F)	John; Clopton (DR)	Samuel; Jordan; Cabell (DR)	John; Dawson (DR)	Anthony; New (DR)	Richard; Brent (DR)	John; Nicholas (DR)	Walter; Jones (DR)
Robert; Page (F)	David; Holmes (DR)	George; Jackson (DR)	Abram; Trigg (DR)	John Johns; Trigg (DR)	Matthew; Clay (DR)	John; Randolph (DR)	Samuel; Goode (DR)	Joseph; Eggleston (DR)	Edwin; Gray (DR)	Josiah; Parker (F)	Thomas; Evans (F)	John; Marshall (F)	Samuel; Jordan; Cabell (DR)	John; Dawson (DR)	Anthony; New (DR)	Leven; Powell (F)	John; Nicholas (DR)	Henry Lee; III (F)
Robert; Page (F)	David; Holmes (DR)	George; Jackson (DR)	Abram; Trigg (DR)	John Johns; Trigg (DR)	Matthew; Clay (DR)	John; Randolph (DR)	Samuel; Goode (DR)	Joseph; Eggleston (DR)	Edwin; Gray (DR)	Josiah; Parker (F)	Thomas; Evans (F)	Littleton; Tazwell (DR)	Samuel; Jordan; Cabell (DR)	John; Dawson (DR)	Anthony; New (DR)	Leven; Powell (F)	John; Nicholas (DR)	Henry Lee; III (F)
John; Smith (DR)	David; Holmes (DR)	George; Jackson (DR)	Abram; Trigg (DR)	John Johns; Trigg (DR)	Matthew; Clay (DR)	John; Randolph (DR)	Thomas; Claiborne (DR)	William Branch; Giles (DR)	Edwin; Gray (DR)	Thomas; Newton Jr. (DR)	John; Stratton (F)	John; Clopton (DR)	Samuel; Jordan; Cabell (DR)	John; Dawson (DR)	Anthony; New (DR)	Richard; Brent (DR)	Philip R. Thompson (DR)	John; Taliaferro (DR)

=== 1803 – 1813: 22 seats ===
Congress	District																					
Congress	1st	2nd	3rd	4th	5th	6th	7th	8th	9th	10th	11th	12th	13th	14th	15th	16th	17th	18th	19th	20th	21st	22nd
8th (1803–1805)	John G. Jackson (DR)	James Stephenson (F)	John; Smith (DR)	David Holmes (DR)	Thomas Lewis (F)	Abram; Trigg (DR)	Joseph; Lewis; Jr. (F)	Walter Jones (DR)	Philip R. Thompson (DR)	John; Dawson (DR)	Anthony New (DR)	Thomas; Griffin (F)	John Johns Trigg (DR)	Matthew; Clay (DR)	John Randolph (DR)	John; Wayles; Eppes (DR)	Thomas Claiborne (DR)	Peterson; Goodwyn (DR)	Edwin; Gray (DR)	Thomas; Newton; Jr. (DR)	Thomas Mann; Randolph; Jr. (DR)	John; Clopton (DR)
8th (1803–1805)	John G. Jackson (DR)	James Stephenson (F)	John; Smith (DR)	David Holmes (DR)	Andrew Moore (DR)	Abram; Trigg (DR)	Joseph; Lewis; Jr. (F)	Walter Jones (DR)	Philip R. Thompson (DR)	John; Dawson (DR)	Anthony New (DR)	Thomas; Griffin (F)	Christopher H. Clark (DR)	Matthew; Clay (DR)	John Randolph (DR)	John; Wayles; Eppes (DR)	Thomas Claiborne (DR)	Peterson; Goodwyn (DR)	Edwin; Gray (DR)	Thomas; Newton; Jr. (DR)	Thomas Mann; Randolph; Jr. (DR)	John; Clopton (DR)
8th (1803–1805)	John G. Jackson (DR)	James Stephenson (F)	John; Smith (DR)	David Holmes (DR)	Alexander Wilson (DR)	Abram; Trigg (DR)	Joseph; Lewis; Jr. (F)	Walter Jones (DR)	Philip R. Thompson (DR)	John; Dawson (DR)	Anthony New (DR)	Thomas; Griffin (F)	Christopher H. Clark (DR)	Matthew; Clay (DR)	John Randolph (DR)	John; Wayles; Eppes (DR)	Thomas Claiborne (DR)	Peterson; Goodwyn (DR)	Edwin; Gray (DR)	Thomas; Newton; Jr. (DR)	Thomas Mann; Randolph; Jr. (DR)	John; Clopton (DR)
9th (1805–1807)	John G. Jackson (DR)	John Morrow (DR)	John; Smith (DR)	David Holmes (DR)	Alexander Wilson (DR)	Abram; Trigg (DR)	Joseph; Lewis; Jr. (F)	Walter Jones (DR)	Philip R. Thompson (DR)	John; Dawson (DR)	James M. Garnett (DR)	Burwell; Bassett (DR)	Christopher H. Clark (DR)	Matthew; Clay (DR)	John Randolph (DR Quid)	John; Wayles; Eppes (DR)	John Claiborne (DR)	Peterson; Goodwyn (DR)	Edwin; Gray (DR Quid)	Thomas; Newton; Jr. (DR)	Thomas Mann; Randolph; Jr. (DR)	John; Clopton (DR)
9th (1805–1807)	John G. Jackson (DR)	John Morrow (DR)	John; Smith (DR)	David Holmes (DR)	Alexander Wilson (DR)	Abram; Trigg (DR)	Joseph; Lewis; Jr. (F)	Walter Jones (DR)	Philip R. Thompson (DR)	John; Dawson (DR)	James M. Garnett (DR)	Burwell; Bassett (DR)	William A. Burwell (DR)	Matthew; Clay (DR)	John Randolph (DR Quid)	John; Wayles; Eppes (DR)	John Claiborne (DR)	Peterson; Goodwyn (DR)	Edwin; Gray (DR Quid)	Thomas; Newton; Jr. (DR)	Thomas Mann; Randolph; Jr. (DR)	John; Clopton (DR)
10th (1807–1809)	John G. Jackson (DR)	John Morrow (DR)	John; Smith (DR)	David Holmes (DR)	Alexander Wilson (DR)	Abram; Trigg (DR)	Joseph; Lewis; Jr. (F)	Walter Jones (DR)	John; Love (DR)	John; Dawson (DR)	James M. Garnett (DR)	Burwell; Bassett (DR)	William A. Burwell (DR)	Matthew; Clay (DR)	John Randolph (DR Quid)	John; Wayles; Eppes (DR)	John Claiborne (DR)	Peterson; Goodwyn (DR)	Edwin; Gray (DR Quid)	Thomas; Newton; Jr. (DR)	Wilson Cary Nicholas (DR)	John; Clopton (DR)
10th (1807–1809)	John G. Jackson (DR)	John Morrow (DR)	John; Smith (DR)	David Holmes (DR)	Alexander Wilson (DR)	Abram; Trigg (DR)	Joseph; Lewis; Jr. (F)	Walter Jones (DR)	John; Love (DR)	John; Dawson (DR)	James M. Garnett (DR)	Burwell; Bassett (DR)	William A. Burwell (DR)	Matthew; Clay (DR)	John Randolph (DR Quid)	John; Wayles; Eppes (DR)	Thomas Gholson Jr. (DR)	Peterson; Goodwyn (DR)	Edwin; Gray (DR Quid)	Thomas; Newton; Jr. (DR)	Wilson Cary Nicholas (DR)	John; Clopton (DR)
11th (1809–1811)	John G. Jackson (DR)	James Stephenson (F)	John; Smith (DR)	Jacob Swoope (F)	James Breckinridge (F)	Daniel Sheffey (F)	Joseph; Lewis; Jr. (F)	Walter Jones (DR)	John; Love (DR)	John; Dawson (DR)	John Roane (DR)	Burwell; Bassett (DR)	William A. Burwell (DR)	Matthew; Clay (DR)	John Randolph (DR Quid)	John; Wayles; Eppes (DR)	Thomas Gholson Jr. (DR)	Peterson; Goodwyn (DR)	Edwin; Gray (DR Quid)	Thomas; Newton; Jr. (DR)	Wilson Cary Nicholas (DR)	John; Clopton (DR)
11th (1809–1811)	William McKinley (DR)	James Stephenson (F)	John; Smith (DR)	Jacob Swoope (F)	James Breckinridge (F)	Daniel Sheffey (F)	Joseph; Lewis; Jr. (F)	Walter Jones (DR)	John; Love (DR)	John; Dawson (DR)	John Roane (DR)	Burwell; Bassett (DR)	William A. Burwell (DR)	Matthew; Clay (DR)	John Randolph (DR Quid)	John; Wayles; Eppes (DR)	Thomas Gholson Jr. (DR)	Peterson; Goodwyn (DR)	Edwin; Gray (DR Quid)	Thomas; Newton; Jr. (DR)	David S. Garland (DR)	John; Clopton (DR)
12th (1811–1813)	Thomas Wilson (F)	John Baker (F)	John; Smith (DR)	William McCoy (DR)	James Breckinridge (F)	Daniel Sheffey (F)	Joseph; Lewis; Jr. (F)	John Hungerford (DR)	Aylett; Hawes (DR)	John; Dawson (DR)	John Roane (DR)	Burwell; Bassett (DR)	William A. Burwell (DR)	Matthew; Clay (DR)	John Randolph (DR Quid)	James Pleasants (DR)	Thomas Gholson Jr. (DR)	Peterson; Goodwyn (DR)	Edwin; Gray (DR Quid)	Thomas; Newton; Jr. (DR)	Hugh Nelson (DR)	John; Clopton (DR)
12th (1811–1813)	Thomas Wilson (F)	John Baker (F)	John; Smith (DR)	William McCoy (DR)	James Breckinridge (F)	Daniel Sheffey (F)	Joseph; Lewis; Jr. (F)	John Taliaferro (DR)	Aylett; Hawes (DR)	John; Dawson (DR)	John Roane (DR)	Burwell; Bassett (DR)	William A. Burwell (DR)	Matthew; Clay (DR)	John Randolph (DR Quid)	James Pleasants (DR)	Thomas Gholson Jr. (DR)	Peterson; Goodwyn (DR)	Edwin; Gray (DR Quid)	Thomas; Newton; Jr. (DR)	Hugh Nelson (DR)	John; Clopton (DR)

=== 1813 – 1823: 23 seats ===
Congress	District																						
Congress	1st	2nd	3rd	4th	5th	6th	7th	8th	9th	10th	11th	12th	13th	14th	15th	16th	17th	18th	19th	20th	21st	22nd	23rd
13th (1813–1815)	John G. Jackson (DR)	Francis White (F)	John Smith (DR)	William McCoy (DR)	James Breckinridge (F)	Daniel Sheffey (F)	Hugh Caperton (F)	Joseph Lewis Jr. (F)	John Hungerford (DR)	Aylett Hawes (DR)	John Dawson (DR)	John Roane (DR)	Thomas Bayly (F)	William A. Burwell (DR)	John Kerr (DR)	John W. Eppes (DR)	James Pleasants (DR)	Thomas Gholson Jr. (DR)	Peterson Goodwyn (DR)	James Johnson (DR)	Thomas Newton Jr. (DR)	Hugh Nelson (DR)	John Clopton (DR)
13th (1813–1815)	John G. Jackson (DR)	Francis White (F)	John Smith (DR)	William McCoy (DR)	James Breckinridge (F)	Daniel Sheffey (F)	Hugh Caperton (F)	Joseph Lewis Jr. (F)	John Hungerford (DR)	Aylett Hawes (DR)	Philip P. Barbour (DR)	John Roane (DR)	Thomas Bayly (F)	William A. Burwell (DR)	John Kerr (DR)	John W. Eppes (DR)	James Pleasants (DR)	Thomas Gholson Jr. (DR)	Peterson Goodwyn (DR)	James Johnson (DR)	Thomas Newton Jr. (DR)	Hugh Nelson (DR)	John Clopton (DR)
14th (1815–1817)	John G. Jackson (DR)	Magnus Tate (F)	Henry St. George Tucker Sr. (DR)	William McCoy (DR)	James Breckinridge (F)	Daniel Sheffey (F)	Ballard Smith (DR)	Joseph Lewis Jr. (F)	John Hungerford (DR)	Aylett Hawes (DR)	Philip P. Barbour (DR)	William H. Roane (DR)	Burwell Bassett (DR)	William A. Burwell (DR)	Matthew Clay (DR)	John Randolph (DR)	James Pleasants (DR)	Thomas Gholson Jr. (DR)	Peterson Goodwyn (DR)	James Johnson (DR)	Thomas Newton Jr. (DR)	Hugh Nelson (DR)	John Clopton (DR)
14th (1815–1817)	John G. Jackson (DR)	Magnus Tate (F)	Henry St. George Tucker Sr. (DR)	William McCoy (DR)	James Breckinridge (F)	Daniel Sheffey (F)	Ballard Smith (DR)	Joseph Lewis Jr. (F)	John Hungerford (DR)	Aylett Hawes (DR)	Philip P. Barbour (DR)	William H. Roane (DR)	Burwell Bassett (DR)	William A. Burwell (DR)	John Kerr (DR)	John Randolph (DR)	James Pleasants (DR)	Thomas M. Nelson (DR)	Peterson Goodwyn (DR)	James Johnson (DR)	Thomas Newton Jr. (DR)	Hugh Nelson (DR)	John Tyler (DR)
15th (1817–1819)	James Pindall (F)	Edward Colston (F)	Henry St. George Tucker Sr. (DR)	William McCoy (DR)	John Floyd (DR)	Alexander Smyth (DR)	Ballard Smith (DR)	Charles F. Mercer (F)	William Lee Ball (DR)	George Strother (DR)	Philip P. Barbour (DR)	Robert S. Garnett (DR)	Burwell Bassett (DR)	William A. Burwell (DR)	William J. Lewis (DR)	Archibald Austin (DR)	James Pleasants (DR)	Thomas M. Nelson (DR)	Peterson Goodwyn (DR)	James Johnson (DR)	Thomas Newton Jr. (DR)	Hugh Nelson (DR)	John Tyler (DR)
15th (1817–1819)	James Pindall (F)	Edward Colston (F)	Henry St. George Tucker Sr. (DR)	William McCoy (DR)	John Floyd (DR)	Alexander Smyth (DR)	Ballard Smith (DR)	Charles F. Mercer (F)	William Lee Ball (DR)	George Strother (DR)	Philip P. Barbour (DR)	Robert S. Garnett (DR)	Burwell Bassett (DR)	William A. Burwell (DR)	William J. Lewis (DR)	Archibald Austin (DR)	James Pleasants (DR)	Thomas M. Nelson (DR)	John Pegram (DR)	James Johnson (DR)	Thomas Newton Jr. (DR)	Hugh Nelson (DR)	John Tyler (DR)
16th (1819–1821)	James Pindall (F)	Thomas Van Swearingen (F)	Jared Williams (DR)	William McCoy (DR)	John Floyd (DR)	Alexander Smyth (DR)	Ballard Smith (DR)	Charles F. Mercer (F)	William Lee Ball (DR)	George Strother (DR)	Philip P. Barbour (DR)	Robert S. Garnett (DR)	Severn E. Parker (DR)	William A. Burwell (DR)	George Tucker (DR)	John Randolph (DR)	James Pleasants (DR)	Mark Alexander (DR)	James Jones (DR)	James Johnson (DR)	Thomas Newton Jr. (DR)	Hugh Nelson (DR)	John Tyler (DR)
16th (1819–1821)	Edward B. Jackson (DR)	Thomas Van Swearingen (F)	Jared Williams (DR)	William McCoy (DR)	John Floyd (DR)	Alexander Smyth (DR)	Ballard Smith (DR)	Charles F. Mercer (F)	William Lee Ball (DR)	Thomas Love Moore (DR)	Philip P. Barbour (DR)	Robert S. Garnett (DR)	Severn E. Parker (DR)	William A. Burwell (DR)	George Tucker (DR)	John Randolph (DR)	William S. Archer (DR)	Mark Alexander (DR)	James Jones (DR)	John C. Gray (DR)	Thomas Newton Jr. (DR)	Hugh Nelson (DR)	John Tyler (DR)
17th (1821–1823)	Edward B. Jackson (DR)	Thomas Van Swearingen (F)	Jared Williams (DR)	William McCoy (DR)	John Floyd (DR)	Alexander Smyth (DR)	William Smith (DR)	Charles F. Mercer (F)	William Lee Ball (DR)	Thomas Love Moore (DR)	Philip P. Barbour (DR)	Robert S. Garnett (DR)	Burwell Bassett (DR)	Jabez Leftwich (DR)	George Tucker (DR)	John Randolph (DR)	William S. Archer (DR)	Mark Alexander (DR)	James Jones (DR)	Arthur Smith (DR)	Thomas Newton Jr. (DR)	Hugh Nelson (DR)	Andrew Stevenson (DR)
17th (1821–1823)	Edward B. Jackson (DR)	James Stephenson (F)	Jared Williams (DR)	William McCoy (DR)	John Floyd (DR)	Alexander Smyth (DR)	William Smith (DR)	Charles F. Mercer (F)	William Lee Ball (DR)	Thomas Love Moore (DR)	Philip P. Barbour (DR)	Robert S. Garnett (DR)	Burwell Bassett (DR)	Jabez Leftwich (DR)	George Tucker (DR)	John Randolph (DR)	William S. Archer (DR)	Mark Alexander (DR)	James Jones (DR)	Arthur Smith (DR)	Thomas Newton Jr. (DR)	Hugh Nelson (DR)	Andrew Stevenson (DR)

=== 1823 – 1833: 22 seats ===
Congress	District																					
Congress	1st	2nd	3rd	4th	5th	6th	7th	8th	9th	10th	11th	12th	13th	14th	15th	16th	17th	18th	19th	20th	21st	22nd
18th (1823–1825)	Thomas Newton Jr. (DR) (Note: Supported the Adams-Clay faction in the 1824 United States presidential election)	Arthur Smith (DR) (Note: Supported the Crawford faction in the 1824 United States presidential election)	William S. Archer (DR)	Mark Alexander (DR)	John Randolph (DR)	George Tucker (DR)	Jabez Leftwich (DR)	Burwell Bassett (DR)	Andrew Stevenson (DR)	William Cabell Rives (DR)	Philip P. Barbour (DR)	Robert Garnett (DR)	William Lee Ball (DR)	Charles F. Mercer (DR)	John S. Barbour (DR)	James Stephenson (F)	Jared Williams (DR)	Joseph Johnson (DR) (Note: Supported the Jackson faction in the 1824 United States presidential election)	William McCoy (DR)	John Floyd (DR)	William Smith (DR)	Alexander Smyth (DR)
18th (1823–1825)	Thomas Newton Jr. (DR)	Arthur Smith (DR)	William S. Archer (DR)	Mark Alexander (DR)	John Randolph (DR)	George Tucker (DR)	Jabez Leftwich (DR)	Burwell Bassett (DR)	Andrew Stevenson (DR)	William Cabell Rives (DR)	Philip P. Barbour (DR)	Robert Garnett (DR)	John Taliaferro (DR)	Charles F. Mercer (DR)	John S. Barbour (DR)	James Stephenson (F)	Jared Williams (DR)	Joseph Johnson (DR)	William McCoy (DR)	John Floyd (DR)	William Smith (DR)	Alexander Smyth (DR)
19th (1825–1827)	Thomas Newton Jr. (NR)	James Trezvant (J)	William S. Archer (J)	Mark Alexander (J)	John Randolph (J)	Thomas Davenport (J)	Nathaniel Claiborne (J)	Burwell Bassett (J)	Andrew Stevenson (J)	William Cabell Rives (J)	Robert Taylor (NR)	Robert S. Garnett (J)	John Taliaferro (NR)	Charles F. Mercer (NR)	John S. Barbour (J)	William Armstrong (NR)	Alfred Powell (NR)	Joseph Johnson (J)	William McCoy (J)	John Floyd (J)	William Smith (J)	Benjamin Estil (NR)
19th (1825–1827)	Thomas Newton Jr. (NR)	James Trezvant (J)	William S. Archer (J)	Mark Alexander (J)	George Crump (J)	Thomas Davenport (J)	Nathaniel Claiborne (J)	Burwell Bassett (J)	Andrew Stevenson (J)	William Cabell Rives (J)	Robert Taylor (NR)	Robert S. Garnett (J)	John Taliaferro (NR)	Charles F. Mercer (NR)	John S. Barbour (J)	William Armstrong (NR)	Alfred Powell (NR)	Joseph Johnson (J)	William McCoy (J)	John Floyd (J)	William Smith (J)	Benjamin Estil (NR)
20th (1827–1829)	Thomas Newton Jr. (NR)	James Trezvant (J)	William S. Archer (J)	Mark Alexander (J)	John Randolph (J)	Thomas Davenport (J)	Nathaniel Claiborne (J)	Burwell Bassett (J)	Andrew Stevenson (J)	William Cabell Rives (J)	Philip P. Barbour (J)	John Roane (J)	John Taliaferro (NR)	Charles F. Mercer (NR)	John S. Barbour (J)	William Armstrong (NR)	Robert Allen (J)	Isaac Leffler (NR)	William McCoy (J)	John Floyd (J)	Lewis Maxwell (NR)	Alexander Smyth (J)
21st (1829–1831)	Thomas Newton Jr. (NR)	James Trezvant (J)	William S. Archer (J)	Mark Alexander (J)	Thomas Bouldin (J)	Thomas Davenport (J)	Nathaniel Claiborne (J)	Richard Coke Jr. (J)	Andrew Stevenson (J)	William Cabell Rives (J)	Philip P. Barbour (J)	John Roane (J)	John Taliaferro (NR)	Charles F. Mercer (NR)	John S. Barbour (J)	William Armstrong (NR)	Robert Allen (J)	Philip Doddridge (NR)	William McCoy (J)	Robert Craig (J)	Lewis Maxwell (NR)	Alexander Smyth (J)
21st (1829–1831)	George Loyall (J)	James Trezvant (J)	William S. Archer (J)	Mark Alexander (J)	Thomas Bouldin (J)	Thomas Davenport (J)	Nathaniel Claiborne (J)	Richard Coke Jr. (J)	Andrew Stevenson (J)	William F. Gordon (J)	John M. Patton (J)	John Roane (J)	John Taliaferro (NR)	Charles F. Mercer (NR)	John S. Barbour (J)	William Armstrong (NR)	Robert Allen (J)	Philip Doddridge (NR)	William McCoy (J)	Robert Craig (J)	Lewis Maxwell (NR)	Joseph Draper (J)
22nd (1831–1833)	Thomas Newton Jr. (NR)	John Y. Mason (J)	William S. Archer (J)	Mark Alexander (J)	Thomas Bouldin (J)	Thomas Davenport (J)	Nathaniel Claiborne (J)	Richard Coke Jr. (J)	Andrew Stevenson (J)	William F. Gordon (J)	John M. Patton (J)	John J. Roane (J)	Joseph Chinn (J)	Charles F. Mercer (NR)	John S. Barbour (J)	William Armstrong (NR)	Robert Allen (J)	Philip Doddridge (NR)	William McCoy (J)	Robert Craig (J)	Lewis Maxwell (NR)	Charles C. Johnston (J)
22nd (1831–1833)	Thomas Newton Jr. (NR)	John Y. Mason (J)	William S. Archer (J)	Mark Alexander (J)	Thomas Bouldin (J)	Thomas Davenport (J)	Nathaniel Claiborne (J)	Richard Coke Jr. (J)	Andrew Stevenson (J)	William F. Gordon (J)	John M. Patton (J)	John J. Roane (J)	Joseph Chinn (J)	Charles F. Mercer (NR)	John S. Barbour (J)	William Armstrong (NR)	Robert Allen (J)	Joseph Johnson (J)	William McCoy (J)	Robert Craig (J)	Lewis Maxwell (NR)	Joseph Draper (J)

=== 1833 – 1843: 21 seats ===
Congress	District																				
Congress	1st	2nd	3rd	4th	5th	6th	7th	8th	9th	10th	11th	12th	13th	14th	15th	16th	17th	18th	19th	20th	21st
23rd (1833–1835)	George Loyall (J)	John Y. Mason (J)	William S. Archer (J)	James Gholson (NR)	John Randolph (J)	Thomas Davenport (NR)	Nathaniel Claiborne (J)	Henry A. Wise (J)	William P. Taylor (NR)	Joseph Chinn (J)	Andrew Stevenson (J)	William F. Gordon (J)	John M. Patton (J)	Charles F. Mercer (NR)	Edward Lucas (J)	James M. H. Beale (J)	Samuel M. Moore (NR)	John H. Fulton (J)	William McComas (J)	John J. Allen (NR)	Edgar C. Wilson (NR)
23rd (1833–1835)	George Loyall (J)	John Y. Mason (J)	William S. Archer (J)	James Gholson (NR)	Thomas Bouldin (J)	Thomas Davenport (NR)	Nathaniel Claiborne (J)	Henry A. Wise (J)	William P. Taylor (NR)	Joseph Chinn (J)	Andrew Stevenson (J)	William F. Gordon (J)	John M. Patton (J)	Charles F. Mercer (NR)	Edward Lucas (J)	James M. H. Beale (J)	Samuel M. Moore (NR)	John H. Fulton (J)	William McComas (J)	John J. Allen (NR)	Edgar C. Wilson (NR)
23rd (1833–1835)	George Loyall (J)	John Y. Mason (J)	William S. Archer (J)	James Gholson (NR)	James Bouldin (J)	Thomas Davenport (NR)	Nathaniel Claiborne (J)	Henry A. Wise (J)	William P. Taylor (NR)	Joseph Chinn (J)	John Robertson (NR)	William F. Gordon (J)	John M. Patton (J)	Charles F. Mercer (NR)	Edward Lucas (J)	James M. H. Beale (J)	Samuel M. Moore (NR)	John H. Fulton (J)	William McComas (J)	John J. Allen (NR)	Edgar C. Wilson (NR)
24th (1835–1837)	George Loyall (J)	John Y. Mason (J)	John Winston Jones (J)	George Dromgoole (J)	James Bouldin (J)	Walter Coles (J)	Nathaniel Claiborne (NR)	Henry A. Wise (J)	John Roane (J)	John Taliaferro (NR)	John Robertson (NR)	James Garland (J)	John M. Patton (J)	Charles F. Mercer (NR)	Edward Lucas (J)	James M. H. Beale (J)	Robert Craig (J)	George W. Hopkins (J)	William McComas (NR)	Joseph Johnson (J)	William S. Morgan (J)
24th (1835–1837)	George Loyall (J)	vacant	John Winston Jones (J)	George Dromgoole (J)	James Bouldin (J)	Walter Coles (J)	Nathaniel Claiborne (NR)	Henry A. Wise (J)	John Roane (J)	John Taliaferro (NR)	John Robertson (NR)	James Garland (J)	John M. Patton (J)	Charles F. Mercer (NR)	Edward Lucas (J)	James M. H. Beale (J)	Robert Craig (J)	George W. Hopkins (J)	William McComas (NR)	Joseph Johnson (J)	William S. Morgan (J)
25th (1837–1839)	Francis Mallory (W)	Francis E. Rives (D)	John Winston Jones (D)	George Dromgoole (D)	James Bouldin (D)	Walter Coles (D)	Archibald Stuart (D)	Henry A. Wise (W)	Robert M. T. Hunter (W)	John Taliaferro (W)	John Robertson (W)	James Garland (D)	John M. Patton (D)	Charles F. Mercer (W)	James M. Mason (D)	Isaac S. Pennybacker (D)	Robert Craig (D)	George W. Hopkins (D)	Andrew Beirne (D)	Joseph Johnson (D)	William S. Morgan (D)
25th (1837–1839)	Francis Mallory (W)	Francis E. Rives (D)	John Winston Jones (D)	George Dromgoole (D)	James Bouldin (D)	Walter Coles (D)	Archibald Stuart (D)	Henry A. Wise (W)	Robert M. T. Hunter (W)	John Taliaferro (W)	John Robertson (W)	James Garland (D)	Linn Banks (D)	Charles F. Mercer (W)	James M. Mason (D)	Isaac S. Pennybacker (D)	Robert Craig (D)	George W. Hopkins (D)	Andrew Beirne (D)	Joseph Johnson (D)	William S. Morgan (D)
26th (1839–1841)	Joel Holleman (D)	Francis E. Rives (D)	John Winston Jones (D)	George Dromgoole (D)	John Hill (W)	Walter Coles (D)	William L. Goggin (W)	Henry A. Wise (W)	Robert M. T. Hunter (W)	John Taliaferro (W)	John Botts (W)	James Garland (Con)	Linn Banks (D)	Charles F. Mercer (W)	William Lucas (D)	Green Berry Samuels (D)	Robert Craig (D)	George W. Hopkins (Con)	Andrew Beirne (D)	Joseph Johnson (D)	Lewis Steenrod (D)
26th (1839–1841)	Francis Mallory (W)	Francis E. Rives (D)	John Winston Jones (D)	George Dromgoole (D)	John Hill (W)	Walter Coles (D)	William L. Goggin (W)	Henry A. Wise (W)	Robert M. T. Hunter (W)	John Taliaferro (W)	John Botts (W)	James Garland (Con)	Linn Banks (D)	William M. McCarty (W)	William Lucas (D)	Green Berry Samuels (D)	Robert Craig (D)	George W. Hopkins (Con)	Andrew Beirne (D)	Joseph Johnson (D)	Lewis Steenrod (D)
27th (1841–1843)	Francis Mallory (W)	George B. Cary (D)	John Winston Jones (D)	William Goode (D)	Edmund W. Hubard (D)	Walter Coles (D)	William L. Goggin (W)	Henry A. Wise (W)	Robert M. T. Hunter (I)	John Taliaferro (W)	John Botts (W)	Thomas Gilmer (W)	Linn Banks (D)	Cuthbert Powell (W)	Richard W. Barton (W)	William A. Harris (D)	Alexander Stuart (W)	George W. Hopkins (D)	George W. Summers (W)	Samuel L. Hays (D)	Lewis Steenrod (D)
27th (1841–1843)	Francis Mallory (W)	George B. Cary (D)	John Winston Jones (D)	William Goode (D)	Edmund W. Hubard (D)	Walter Coles (D)	William L. Goggin (W)	Henry A. Wise (W)	Robert M. T. Hunter (I)	John Taliaferro (W)	John Botts (W)	Thomas Gilmer (W)	William Smith (D)	Cuthbert Powell (W)	Richard W. Barton (W)	William A. Harris (D)	Alexander Stuart (W)	George W. Hopkins (D)	George W. Summers (W)	Samuel L. Hays (D)	Lewis Steenrod (D)

=== 1843 – 1853: 15 seats ===
Congress	District														
Congress	1st	2nd	3rd	4th	5th	6th	7th	8th	9th	10th	11th	12th	13th	14th	15th
28th (1843–1845)	Archibald; Atkinson (D)	George; Dromgoole (D)	Walter; Coles (D)	Edmund W. Hubard (D)	Thomas Walker; Gilmer (D)	John Winston; Jones (D)	Henry A. Wise (D)	Willoughby; Newton (W)	Samuel; Chilton (W)	William; Lucas (D)	William; Taylor (D)	Augustus A. Chapman (D)	George W. Hopkins (D)	George W. Summers (W)	Lewis; Steenrod (D)
28th (1843–1845)	Archibald; Atkinson (D)	George; Dromgoole (D)	Walter; Coles (D)	Edmund W. Hubard (D)	William L. Goggin (W)	John Winston; Jones (D)	Thomas H. Bayly (D)	Willoughby; Newton (W)	Samuel; Chilton (W)	William; Lucas (D)	William; Taylor (D)	Augustus A. Chapman (D)	George W. Hopkins (D)	George W. Summers (W)	Lewis; Steenrod (D)
29th (1845–1847)	Archibald; Atkinson (D)	George; Dromgoole (D)	William; Tredway (D)	Edmund W. Hubard (D)	Shelton; Leake (D)	James; Seddon (D)	Thomas H. Bayly (D)	Robert M. T. Hunter (D)	John; Pendleton (W)	Henry; Bedinger (D)	William; Taylor (D)	Augustus A. Chapman (D)	George W. Hopkins (D)	Joseph; Johnson (D)	William G. Brown Sr. (D)
29th (1845–1847)	Archibald; Atkinson (D)	George; Dromgoole (D)	William; Tredway (D)	Edmund W. Hubard (D)	Shelton; Leake (D)	James; Seddon (D)	Thomas H. Bayly (D)	Robert M. T. Hunter (D)	John; Pendleton (W)	Henry; Bedinger (D)	James; McDowell (D)	Augustus A. Chapman (D)	George W. Hopkins (D)	Joseph; Johnson (D)	William G. Brown Sr. (D)
30th (1847–1849)	Archibald; Atkinson (D)	George; Dromgoole (D)	Thomas; Flournoy (W)	Thomas S. Bocock (D)	William L. Goggin (W)	John; Botts (W)	Thomas H. Bayly (D)	Richard L. T. Beale (D)	John; Pendleton (W)	Henry; Bedinger (D)	James; McDowell (D)	William B. Preston (W)	Andrew S. Fulton (W)	Robert A. Thompson (D)	William G. Brown Sr. (D)
30th (1847–1849)	Archibald; Atkinson (D)	Richard; Kidder; Meade (D)	Thomas; Flournoy (W)	Thomas S. Bocock (D)	William L. Goggin (W)	John; Botts (W)	Thomas H. Bayly (D)	Richard L. T. Beale (D)	John; Pendleton (W)	Henry; Bedinger (D)	James; McDowell (D)	William B. Preston (W)	Andrew S. Fulton (W)	Robert A. Thompson (D)	William G. Brown Sr. (D)
31st (1849–1851)	John; Millson (D)	Richard; Kidder; Meade (D)	Thomas H. Averett (D)	Thomas S. Bocock (D)	Paulus; Powell (D)	James; Seddon (D)	Thomas H. Bayly (D)	Alexander; Holladay (D)	Jeremiah; Morton (W)	Richard; Parker (D)	James; McDowell (D)	Henry A. Edmundson (D)	Fayette; McMullen (D)	James M. H. Beale (D)	Alexander Newman (D)
31st (1849–1851)	John; Millson (D)	Richard; Kidder; Meade (D)	Thomas H. Averett (D)	Thomas S. Bocock (D)	Paulus; Powell (D)	James; Seddon (D)	Thomas H. Bayly (D)	Alexander; Holladay (D)	Jeremiah; Morton (W)	Richard; Parker (D)	James; McDowell (D)	Henry A. Edmundson (D)	Fayette; McMullen (D)	James M. H. Beale (D)	Thomas Haymond (W)
32nd (1851–1853)	John; Millson (D)	Richard; Kidder; Meade (D)	Thomas H. Averett (D)	Thomas S. Bocock (D)	Paulus; Powell (D)	John; Caskie (D)	Thomas H. Bayly (D)	Alexander; Holladay (D)	James F. Strother (W)	Charles J. Faulkner (W)	John; Letcher (D)	Henry A. Edmundson (D)	Fayette; McMullen (D)	James M. H. Beale (D)	George W. Thompson (D)
32nd (1851–1853)	John; Millson (D)	Richard; Kidder; Meade (D)	Thomas H. Averett (D)	Thomas S. Bocock (D)	Paulus; Powell (D)	John; Caskie (D)	Thomas H. Bayly (D)	Alexander; Holladay (D)	James F. Strother (W)	Charles J. Faulkner (W)	John; Letcher (D)	Henry A. Edmundson (D)	Fayette; McMullen (D)	James M. H. Beale (D)	Sherrard Clemens (D)

=== 1853 – 1863: 13 seats ===
Congress	District												
Congress	1st	2nd	3rd	4th	5th	6th	7th	8th	9th	10th	11th	12th	13th
33rd (1853–1855)	Thomas H. Bayly (D)	John; Millson (D)	John Caskie (D)	William; Goode (D)	Thomas S. Bocock (D)	Paulus; Powell (D)	William; Smith (D)	Charles J. Faulkner (W)	John; Letcher (D)	Zedekiah; Kidwell (D)	John F. Snodgrass (D)	Henry A. Edmundson (D)	Fayette; McMullen (D)
33rd (1853–1855)	Thomas H. Bayly (D)	John; Millson (D)	John Caskie (D)	William; Goode (D)	Thomas S. Bocock (D)	Paulus; Powell (D)	William; Smith (D)	Charles J. Faulkner (W)	John; Letcher (D)	Zedekiah; Kidwell (D)	Charles S. Lewis (D)	Henry A. Edmundson (D)	Fayette; McMullen (D)
34th (1855–1857)	Thomas H. Bayly (D)	John; Millson (D)	John Caskie (D)	William; Goode (D)	Thomas S. Bocock (D)	Paulus; Powell (D)	William; Smith (D)	Charles J. Faulkner (D)	John; Letcher (D)	Zedekiah; Kidwell (D)	John S. Carlile (KN)	Henry A. Edmundson (D)	Fayette; McMullen (D)
34th (1855–1857)	Muscoe; R. H. Garnett (D)	John; Millson (D)	John Caskie (D)	William; Goode (D)	Thomas S. Bocock (D)	Paulus; Powell (D)	William; Smith (D)	Charles J. Faulkner (D)	John; Letcher (D)	Zedekiah; Kidwell (D)	John S. Carlile (KN)	Henry A. Edmundson (D)	Fayette; McMullen (D)
35th (1857–1859)	Muscoe; R. H. Garnett (D)	John; Millson (D)	John Caskie (D)	William; Goode (D)	Thomas S. Bocock (D)	Paulus; Powell (D)	William; Smith (D)	Charles J. Faulkner (D)	John; Letcher (D)	Sherrard; Clemens (D)	Albert G. Jenkins (D)	Henry A. Edmundson (D)	George W. Hopkins (D)
36th (1859–1861)	Muscoe; R. H. Garnett (D)	John; Millson (D)	Daniel C. DeJarnette; Sr. (ID)	William; Goode (D)	Thomas S. Bocock (D)	Shelton; Leake (ID)	William; Smith (D)	Alexander; Boteler (O)	John T. Harris (ID)	Sherrard; Clemens (D)	Albert G. Jenkins (D)	Henry A. Edmundson (D)	Elbert S. Martin (ID)
36th (1859–1861)	Muscoe; R. H. Garnett (D)	John; Millson (D)	Daniel C. DeJarnette; Sr. (ID)	Roger A. Pryor (D)	Thomas S. Bocock (D)	Shelton; Leake (ID)	William; Smith (D)	Alexander; Boteler (O)	John T. Harris (ID)	Sherrard; Clemens (D)	Albert G. Jenkins (D)	Henry A. Edmundson (D)	Elbert S. Martin (ID)
37th (1861–1863)	Vacant	American Civil War					Charles Upton (U)	American Civil War		William G. Brown Sr. (U)	John S. Carlile (U) (Note: The delegation during the 37th Congress has incomplete district data. In some sources, Carlile and Whaley are shown as both starting on March 4, 1861 — which is the starting date of that Congress — but other sources list them as both being elected in district 11 which contradicts that they both served simultaneously.)	Kellian; Whaley (U)	American; Civil War
37th (1861–1863)	Joseph Segar (U)	American Civil War					Lewis McKenzie (U)	American Civil War		William G. Brown Sr. (U)	Jacob B. Blair (U)	Kellian; Whaley (U)	American; Civil War

=== 1863 – 1873: 8 seats ===
The 1860 census allotted 11 seats to Virginia, but 3 were assigned to West Virginia, established in 1863. Virginia was left with 8 seats. For most of this decade, however, Virginian representatives were not seated in Congress because of Virginia's secession in the Civil War. After January 26, 1870, Virginia was allowed to seat members. The state convention called for a ninth seat, at-large, but the House rejected the credentials of its claimant, Joseph Segar.

Congress	District							
Congress	1st	2nd	3rd	4th	5th	6th	7th	8th
38th, 39th, 40th (1863–1869)	American Civil War and Reconstruction							
41st (1869–1871)	American Civil War and Reconstruction							
41st (1869–1871)	Richard S. Ayer (R)	James H. Platt Jr. (R)	Charles H. Porter (R)	George; Booker (Con)	Robert Ridgway (Con)	William; Milnes Jr. (Con)	Lewis; McKenzie (Con)	James K. Gibson (Con)
41st (1869–1871)	Richard S. Ayer (R)	James H. Platt Jr. (R)	Charles H. Porter (R)	George; Booker (Con)	Richard T. W. Duke (Con)	William; Milnes Jr. (Con)	Lewis; McKenzie (Con)	James K. Gibson (Con)
42nd (1871–1873)	John; Critcher (D)	James H. Platt Jr. (R)	Charles H. Porter (R)	William H. H. Stowell (R)	Richard T. W. Duke (Con)	John T. Harris (D)	Elliott M. Braxton (D)	William; Terry (D)

=== 1873 – 1883: 9 seats ===
Following the 1870 census, Virginia was allotted 9 seats.

Congress	District								
Congress	1st	2nd	3rd	4th	5th	6th	7th	8th	9th
43rd (1873–1875)	James Beverley; Sener (R)	James H. Platt Jr. (R)	J. Ambler; Smith (R)	William H. H. Stowell (R)	Alexander Davis (D)	Thomas; Whitehead (D)	John T. Harris (D)	Eppa Hunton (D)	Rees Bowen (D)
43rd (1873–1875)	James Beverley; Sener (R)	James H. Platt Jr. (R)	J. Ambler; Smith (R)	William H. H. Stowell (R)	Christopher Thomas (R)	Thomas; Whitehead (D)	John T. Harris (D)	Eppa Hunton (D)	Rees Bowen (D)
44th (1875–1877)	Beverly B. Douglas (D)	John Goode (D)	Gilbert C. Walker (D)	William H. H. Stowell (R)	George Cabell (D)	J. Randolph; Tucker (D)	John T. Harris (D)	Eppa Hunton (D)	William Terry (D)
45th (1877–1879)	Beverly B. Douglas (D)	John Goode (D)	Gilbert C. Walker (D)	Joseph; Jorgensen (R)	George Cabell (D)	J. Randolph; Tucker (D)	John T. Harris (D)	Eppa Hunton (D)	Auburn Pridemore (D)
45th (1877–1879)	Richard L. T. Beale (D)	John Goode (D)	Gilbert C. Walker (D)	Joseph; Jorgensen (R)	George Cabell (D)	J. Randolph; Tucker (D)	John T. Harris (D)	Eppa Hunton (D)	Auburn Pridemore (D)
46th (1879–1881)	Richard L. T. Beale (D)	John Goode (D)	Joseph E. Johnston (D)	Joseph; Jorgensen (R)	George Cabell (D)	J. Randolph; Tucker (D)	John T. Harris (D)	Eppa Hunton (D)	James B. Richmond (D)
47th (1881–1883)	George T. Garrison (D)	John F. Dezendorf (R)	George D. Wise (D)	Joseph; Jorgensen (R)	George Cabell (D)	J. Randolph; Tucker (D)	John Paul (RA)	John S. Barbour Jr. (D)	Abram Fulkerson (RA)

=== 1883 – 1933: 10 seats ===
After the 1880 census, Virginia gained one seat. For the 48th Congress, a new at-large seat was added to the 9 districts. Starting in the 49th Congress, however, the state was redistricted into 10 districts.

Congress	District									
Congress	1st	2nd	3rd	4th	5th	6th	7th	8th	9th	At-large
48th (1883–1885)	Robert Mayo (RA)	Harry Libbey (RA)	George D. Wise (D)	Benjamin S. Hooper (RA)	George Cabell (D)	J. Randolph; Tucker (D)	John Paul (RA)	John S. Barbour Jr. (D)	Henry; Bowen (RA)	John Sergeant; Wise (RA)
48th (1883–1885)	George Garrison (D)	Harry Libbey (RA)	George D. Wise (D)	Benjamin S. Hooper (RA)	George Cabell (D)	J. Randolph; Tucker (D)	Charles T. O'Ferrall (D)	John S. Barbour Jr. (D)	Henry; Bowen (RA)	John Sergeant; Wise (RA)
49th (1885–1887)	Thomas; Croxton (D)	Harry Libbey (R)	George D. Wise (D)	James Dennis; Brady (R)	George Cabell (D)	John W. Daniel (D)	Charles T. O'Ferrall (D)	John S. Barbour Jr. (D)	Connally Findlay; Trigg (D)	10th
49th (1885–1887)	Thomas; Croxton (D)	Harry Libbey (R)	George D. Wise (D)	James Dennis; Brady (R)	George Cabell (D)	John W. Daniel (D)	Charles T. O'Ferrall (D)	John S. Barbour Jr. (D)	Connally Findlay; Trigg (D)	J. R. Tucker (D)
50th (1887–1889)	Thomas H. B. Browne (R)	George E. Bowden (R)	George D. Wise (D)	William Gaines (R)	John Robert; Brown (R)	Samuel I. Hopkins (Lab)	Charles T. O'Ferrall (D)	W. H. F. Lee (D)	Henry Bowen (R)	Jacob Yost (R)
51st (1889–1891)	Thomas H. B. Browne (R)	George E. Bowden (R)	George D. Wise (D)	Edward Venable (D)	Posey G. Lester (D)	Paul C. Edmunds (D)	Charles T. O'Ferrall (D)	W. H. F. Lee (D)	John A. Buchanan (D)	Henry St. George; Tucker III (D)
51st (1889–1891)	Thomas H. B. Browne (R)	George E. Bowden (R)	Edmund; Waddill Jr. (R)	John Mercer; Langston (R)	Posey G. Lester (D)	Paul C. Edmunds (D)	Charles T. O'Ferrall (D)	W. H. F. Lee (D)	John A. Buchanan (D)	Henry St. George; Tucker III (D)
52nd (1891–1893)	William; Atkinson; Jones (D)	John W. Lawson (D)	George D. Wise (D)	James F. Epes (D)	Posey G. Lester (D)	Paul C. Edmunds (D)	Charles T. O'Ferrall (D)	W. H. F. Lee (D)	John A. Buchanan (D)	Henry St. George; Tucker III (D)
52nd (1891–1893)	William; Atkinson; Jones (D)	John W. Lawson (D)	George D. Wise (D)	James F. Epes (D)	Posey G. Lester (D)	Paul C. Edmunds (D)	Charles T. O'Ferrall (D)	Elisha E. Meredith (D)	John A. Buchanan (D)	Henry St. George; Tucker III (D)
53rd (1893–1895)	William; Atkinson; Jones (D)	David Gardiner; Tyler (D)	George D. Wise (D)	James F. Epes (D)	Claude A. Swanson (D)	Paul C. Edmunds (D)	Charles T. O'Ferrall (D)	Elisha E. Meredith (D)	James W. Marshall (D)	Henry St. George; Tucker III (D)
53rd (1893–1895)	William; Atkinson; Jones (D)	David Gardiner; Tyler (D)	George D. Wise (D)	James F. Epes (D)	Claude A. Swanson (D)	Paul C. Edmunds (D)	Smith S. Turner (D)	Elisha E. Meredith (D)	James W. Marshall (D)	Henry St. George; Tucker III (D)
54th (1895–1897)	William; Atkinson; Jones (D)	David Gardiner; Tyler (D)	Tazewell Ellett (D)	William McKenney (D)	Claude A. Swanson (D)	Peter J. Otey (D)	Smith S. Turner (D)	Elisha E. Meredith (D)	James A. Walker (R)	Henry St. George; Tucker III (D)
54th (1895–1897)	William; Atkinson; Jones (D)	David Gardiner; Tyler (D)	Tazewell Ellett (D)	Robert Thorp (R)	Claude A. Swanson (D)	Peter J. Otey (D)	Smith S. Turner (D)	Elisha E. Meredith (D)	James A. Walker (R)	Henry St. George; Tucker III (D)
55th (1897–1899)	William; Atkinson; Jones (D)	William Young (D)	John Lamb (D)	Sydney Epes (D)	Claude A. Swanson (D)	Peter J. Otey (D)	James Hay (D)	John Franklin; Rixey (D)	James A. Walker (R)	Jacob Yost (R)
55th (1897–1899)	William; Atkinson; Jones (D)	Richard Wise (R)	John Lamb (D)	Robert Thorp (R)	Claude A. Swanson (D)	Peter J. Otey (D)	James Hay (D)	John Franklin; Rixey (D)	James A. Walker (R)	Jacob Yost (R)
56th (1899–1901)	William; Atkinson; Jones (D)	William Young (D)	John Lamb (D)	Sydney Epes (D)	Claude A. Swanson (D)	Peter J. Otey (D)	James Hay (D)	John Franklin; Rixey (D)	William F. Rhea (D)	Julian M. Quarles (D)
56th (1899–1901)	William; Atkinson; Jones (D)	Richard Wise (R)	John Lamb (D)	Francis R. Lassiter (D)	Claude A. Swanson (D)	Peter J. Otey (D)	James Hay (D)	John Franklin; Rixey (D)	William F. Rhea (D)	Julian M. Quarles (D)
57th (1901–1903)	William; Atkinson; Jones (D)	Harry L. Maynard (D)	John Lamb (D)	Francis R. Lassiter (D)	Claude A. Swanson (D)	Peter J. Otey (D)	James Hay (D)	John Franklin; Rixey (D)	William F. Rhea (D)	Henry D. Flood (D)
57th (1901–1903)	William; Atkinson; Jones (D)	Harry L. Maynard (D)	John Lamb (D)	Francis R. Lassiter (D)	Claude A. Swanson (D)	Carter; Glass (D)	James Hay (D)	John Franklin; Rixey (D)	William F. Rhea (D)	Henry D. Flood (D)
58th (1903–1905)	William; Atkinson; Jones (D)	Harry L. Maynard (D)	John Lamb (D)	Robert G. Southall (D)	Claude A. Swanson (D)	Carter; Glass (D)	James Hay (D)	John Franklin; Rixey (D)	Campbell; Slemp (R)	Henry D. Flood (D)
59th (1905–1907)	William; Atkinson; Jones (D)	Harry L. Maynard (D)	John Lamb (D)	Robert G. Southall (D)	Claude A. Swanson (D)	Carter; Glass (D)	James Hay (D)	John Franklin; Rixey (D)	Campbell; Slemp (R)	Henry D. Flood (D)
59th (1905–1907)	William; Atkinson; Jones (D)	Harry L. Maynard (D)	John Lamb (D)	Robert G. Southall (D)	Edward W. Saunders (D)	Carter; Glass (D)	James Hay (D)	John Franklin; Rixey (D)	Campbell; Slemp (R)	Henry D. Flood (D)
60th (1907–1909)	William; Atkinson; Jones (D)	Harry L. Maynard (D)	John Lamb (D)	Francis R. Lassiter (D)	Edward W. Saunders (D)	Carter; Glass (D)	James Hay (D)	Charles; Creighton; Carlin (D)	Campbell; Slemp (R)	Henry D. Flood (D)
60th (1907–1909)	William; Atkinson; Jones (D)	Harry L. Maynard (D)	John Lamb (D)	Francis R. Lassiter (D)	Edward W. Saunders (D)	Carter; Glass (D)	James Hay (D)	Charles; Creighton; Carlin (D)	C. Bascom; Slemp (R)	Henry D. Flood (D)
61st (1909–1911)	William; Atkinson; Jones (D)	Harry L. Maynard (D)	John Lamb (D)	Francis R. Lassiter (D)	Edward W. Saunders (D)	Carter; Glass (D)	James Hay (D)	Charles; Creighton; Carlin (D)	C. Bascom; Slemp (R)	Henry D. Flood (D)
61st (1909–1911)	William; Atkinson; Jones (D)	Harry L. Maynard (D)	John Lamb (D)	Robert Turnbull (D)	Edward W. Saunders (D)	Carter; Glass (D)	James Hay (D)	Charles; Creighton; Carlin (D)	C. Bascom; Slemp (R)	Henry D. Flood (D)
62nd (1911–1913)	William; Atkinson; Jones (D)	Edward E. Holand (D)	John Lamb (D)	Robert Turnbull (D)	Edward W. Saunders (D)	Carter; Glass (D)	James Hay (D)	Charles; Creighton; Carlin (D)	C. Bascom; Slemp (R)	Henry D. Flood (D)
63rd (1913–1915)	William; Atkinson; Jones (D)	Edward E. Holand (D)	Andrew J. Montague (D)	Walter A. Watson (D)	Edward W. Saunders (D)	Carter; Glass (D)	James Hay (D)	Charles; Creighton; Carlin (D)	C. Bascom; Slemp (R)	Henry D. Flood (D)
64th (1915–1917)	William; Atkinson; Jones (D)	Edward E. Holand (D)	Andrew J. Montague (D)	Walter A. Watson (D)	Edward W. Saunders (D)	Carter; Glass (D)	James Hay (D)	Charles; Creighton; Carlin (D)	C. Bascom; Slemp (R)	Henry D. Flood (D)
64th (1915–1917)	William; Atkinson; Jones (D)	Edward E. Holand (D)	Andrew J. Montague (D)	Walter A. Watson (D)	Edward W. Saunders (D)	Carter; Glass (D)	Thomas W. Harrison (D)	Charles; Creighton; Carlin (D)	C. Bascom; Slemp (R)	Henry D. Flood (D)
65th (1917–1919)	William; Atkinson; Jones (D)	Edward E. Holand (D)	Andrew J. Montague (D)	Walter A. Watson (D)	Edward W. Saunders (D)	Carter; Glass (D)	Thomas W. Harrison (D)	Charles; Creighton; Carlin (D)	C. Bascom; Slemp (R)	Henry D. Flood (D)
65th (1917–1919)	S. Otis Bland (D)	Edward E. Holand (D)	Andrew J. Montague (D)	Walter A. Watson (D)	Edward W. Saunders (D)	James P. Woods (D)	Thomas W. Harrison (D)	Charles; Creighton; Carlin (D)	C. Bascom; Slemp (R)	Henry D. Flood (D)
66th (1919–1921)	S. Otis Bland (D)	Edward E. Holand (D)	Andrew J. Montague (D)	Walter A. Watson (D)	Edward W. Saunders (D)	James P. Woods (D)	Thomas W. Harrison (D)	R. Walton; Moore (D)	C. Bascom; Slemp (R)	Henry D. Flood (D)
66th (1919–1921)	S. Otis Bland (D)	Edward E. Holand (D)	Andrew J. Montague (D)	Patrick H. Drewry (D)	Rorer A. James (D)	James P. Woods (D)	Thomas W. Harrison (D)	R. Walton; Moore (D)	C. Bascom; Slemp (R)	Henry D. Flood (D)
67th (1921–1923)	S. Otis Bland (D)	Joseph T. Deal (D)	Andrew J. Montague (D)	Patrick H. Drewry (D)	Rorer A. James (D)	James P. Woods (D)	Thomas W. Harrison (D)	R. Walton; Moore (D)	C. Bascom; Slemp (R)	Henry D. Flood (D)
67th (1921–1923)	S. Otis Bland (D)	Joseph T. Deal (D)	Andrew J. Montague (D)	Patrick H. Drewry (D)	J. Murray; Hooker (D)	James P. Woods (D)	John Paul Jr. (R)	R. Walton; Moore (D)	C. Bascom; Slemp (R)	Henry St. George; Tucker III (D)
68th (1923–1925)	S. Otis Bland (D)	Joseph T. Deal (D)	Andrew J. Montague (D)	Patrick H. Drewry (D)	J. Murray; Hooker (D)	Clifton A. Woodrum (D)	Thomas W. Harrison (D)	R. Walton; Moore (D)	George C. Peery (D)	Henry St. George; Tucker III (D)
69th (1925–1927)	S. Otis Bland (D)	Joseph T. Deal (D)	Andrew J. Montague (D)	Patrick H. Drewry (D)	Joseph; Whitehead (D)	Clifton A. Woodrum (D)	Thomas W. Harrison (D)	R. Walton; Moore (D)	George C. Peery (D)	Henry St. George; Tucker III (D)
70th (1927–1929)	S. Otis Bland (D)	Joseph T. Deal (D)	Andrew J. Montague (D)	Patrick H. Drewry (D)	Joseph; Whitehead (D)	Clifton A. Woodrum (D)	Thomas W. Harrison (D)	R. Walton; Moore (D)	George C. Peery (D)	Henry St. George; Tucker III (D)
71st (1929–1931)	S. Otis Bland (D)	Mack; Lankford (R)	Andrew J. Montague (D)	Patrick H. Drewry (D)	Joseph; Whitehead (D)	Clifton A. Woodrum (D)	Jacob Garber (R)	R. Walton; Moore (D)	Joseph Shaffer (R)	Henry St. George; Tucker III (D)
72nd (1931–1933)	S. Otis Bland (D)	Mack; Lankford (R)	Andrew J. Montague (D)	Patrick H. Drewry (D)	Thomas G. Burch (D)	Clifton A. Woodrum (D)	John W. Fishburne (D)	Howard W. Smith (D)	John W. Flannagan (D)	Henry St. George; Tucker III (D)
72nd (1931–1933)	S. Otis Bland (D)	Mack; Lankford (R)	Andrew J. Montague (D)	Patrick H. Drewry (D)	Thomas G. Burch (D)	Clifton A. Woodrum (D)	John W. Fishburne (D)	Howard W. Smith (D)	John W. Flannagan (D)	Joel Flood (D)

=== 1933 – 1953: 9 seats ===
After the 1930 census, Virginia lost one seat. For the 73rd Congress (1933–1935), all nine representatives were elected at-large statewide. In all subsequent Congresses, representatives were elected from districts.

Congress	Elected statewide at-large								
Congress	1st seat	2nd seat	3rd seat	4th seat	5th seat	6th seat	7th seat	8th seat	9th seat
73rd (1933–1935)	S. Otis; Bland (D)	Colgate Darden (D)	Andrew J. Montague (D)	Patrick H. Drewry (D)	Thomas G. Burch (D)	Clifton A. Woodrum (D)	A. Willis; Robertson (D)	Howard W. Smith (D)	John W. Flannagan (D)
Congress	District								
Congress	1st	2nd	3rd	4th	5th	6th	7th	8th	9th
74th (1935–1937)	S. Otis; Bland (D)	Colgate Darden (D)	Andrew J. Montague (D)	Patrick H. Drewry (D)	Thomas G. Burch (D)	Clifton A. Woodrum (D)	A. Willis; Robertson (D)	Howard W. Smith (D)	John W. Flannagan (D)
75th (1937–1939)	S. Otis; Bland (D)	Norman R. Hamilton (D)	Andrew J. Montague (D)	Patrick H. Drewry (D)	Thomas G. Burch (D)	Clifton A. Woodrum (D)	A. Willis; Robertson (D)	Howard W. Smith (D)	John W. Flannagan (D)
75th (1937–1939)	S. Otis; Bland (D)	Norman R. Hamilton (D)	Dave E. Satterfield (D)	Patrick H. Drewry (D)	Thomas G. Burch (D)	Clifton A. Woodrum (D)	A. Willis; Robertson (D)	Howard W. Smith (D)	John W. Flannagan (D)
76th (1939–1941)	S. Otis; Bland (D)	Colgate Darden (D)	Dave E. Satterfield (D)	Patrick H. Drewry (D)	Thomas G. Burch (D)	Clifton A. Woodrum (D)	A. Willis; Robertson (D)	Howard W. Smith (D)	John W. Flannagan (D)
77th (1941–1943)	S. Otis; Bland (D)	Colgate Darden (D)	Dave E. Satterfield (D)	Patrick H. Drewry (D)	Thomas G. Burch (D)	Clifton A. Woodrum (D)	A. Willis; Robertson (D)	Howard W. Smith (D)	John W. Flannagan (D)
77th (1941–1943)	S. Otis; Bland (D)	Winder R. Harris (D)	Dave E. Satterfield (D)	Patrick H. Drewry (D)	Thomas G. Burch (D)	Clifton A. Woodrum (D)	A. Willis; Robertson (D)	Howard W. Smith (D)	John W. Flannagan (D)
78th (1943–1945)	S. Otis; Bland (D)	Winder R. Harris (D)	Dave E. Satterfield (D)	Patrick H. Drewry (D)	Thomas G. Burch (D)	Clifton A. Woodrum (D)	A. Willis; Robertson (D)	Howard W. Smith (D)	John W. Flannagan (D)
78th (1943–1945)	S. Otis; Bland (D)	Ralph Hunger; Daughton (D)	Dave E. Satterfield (D)	Patrick H. Drewry (D)	Thomas G. Burch (D)	Clifton A. Woodrum (D)	A. Willis; Robertson (D)	Howard W. Smith (D)	John W. Flannagan (D)
79th (1945–1947)	S. Otis; Bland (D)	Ralph Hunger; Daughton (D)	J. Vaughan; Gary (D)	Patrick H. Drewry (D)	Thomas G. Burch (D)	J. Lindsay; Almond (D)	A. Willis; Robertson (D)	Howard W. Smith (D)	John W. Flannagan (D)
79th (1945–1947)	S. Otis; Bland (D)	Ralph Hunger; Daughton (D)	J. Vaughan; Gary (D)	Patrick H. Drewry (D)	Thomas B. Stanley (D)	J. Lindsay; Almond (D)	Burr; Harrison (D)	Howard W. Smith (D)	John W. Flannagan (D)
80th (1947–1949)	S. Otis; Bland (D)	Porter Hardy Jr. (D)	J. Vaughan; Gary (D)	Patrick H. Drewry (D)	Thomas B. Stanley (D)	J. Lindsay; Almond (D)	Burr; Harrison (D)	Howard W. Smith (D)	John W. Flannagan (D)
80th (1947–1949)	S. Otis; Bland (D)	Porter Hardy Jr. (D)	J. Vaughan; Gary (D)	Watkins; Abbitt (D)	Thomas B. Stanley (D)	Clarence G. Burton (D)	Burr; Harrison (D)	Howard W. Smith (D)	John W. Flannagan (D)
81st (1949–1951)	S. Otis; Bland (D)	Porter Hardy Jr. (D)	J. Vaughan; Gary (D)	Watkins; Abbitt (D)	Thomas B. Stanley (D)	Clarence G. Burton (D)	Burr; Harrison (D)	Howard W. Smith (D)	John W. Flannagan (D)
81st (1949–1951)	Edward J. Robeson Jr. (D)	Porter Hardy Jr. (D)	J. Vaughan; Gary (D)	Watkins; Abbitt (D)	Thomas B. Stanley (D)	Clarence G. Burton (D)	Burr; Harrison (D)	Howard W. Smith (D)	Thomas B. Fugate (D)
82nd (1951–1953)	Edward J. Robeson Jr. (D)	Porter Hardy Jr. (D)	J. Vaughan; Gary (D)	Watkins; Abbitt (D)	Thomas B. Stanley (D)	Clarence G. Burton (D)	Burr; Harrison (D)	Howard W. Smith (D)	Thomas B. Fugate (D)

=== 1953 – 1993: 10 seats ===
In 1953, Virginia gained one seat.

Congress	District									
Congress	1st	2nd	3rd	4th	5th	6th	7th	8th	9th	10th
83rd (1953–1955)	Edward J. Robeson; Jr. (D)	Porter; Hardy Jr. (D)	J. Vaughan; Gary (D)	Watkins; Abbitt (D)	Thomas B. Stanley (D)	Dick; Poff (R)	Burr; Harrison (D)	Howard W. Smith (D)	William C. Wampler (R)	Joel; Broyhill (R)
83rd (1953–1955)	Edward J. Robeson; Jr. (D)	Porter; Hardy Jr. (D)	J. Vaughan; Gary (D)	Watkins; Abbitt (D)	William M. Tuck (D)	Dick; Poff (R)	Burr; Harrison (D)	Howard W. Smith (D)	William C. Wampler (R)	Joel; Broyhill (R)
84th (1955–1957)	Edward J. Robeson; Jr. (D)	Porter; Hardy Jr. (D)	J. Vaughan; Gary (D)	Watkins; Abbitt (D)	William M. Tuck (D)	Dick; Poff (R)	Burr; Harrison (D)	Howard W. Smith (D)	W. Pat; Jennings (D)	Joel; Broyhill (R)
85th (1957–1959)	Edward J. Robeson; Jr. (D)	Porter; Hardy Jr. (D)	J. Vaughan; Gary (D)	Watkins; Abbitt (D)	William M. Tuck (D)	Dick; Poff (R)	Burr; Harrison (D)	Howard W. Smith (D)	W. Pat; Jennings (D)	Joel; Broyhill (R)
86th (1959–1961)	Thomas N. Downing (D)	Porter; Hardy Jr. (D)	J. Vaughan; Gary (D)	Watkins; Abbitt (D)	William M. Tuck (D)	Dick; Poff (R)	Burr; Harrison (D)	Howard W. Smith (D)	W. Pat; Jennings (D)	Joel; Broyhill (R)
87th (1961–1963)	Thomas N. Downing (D)	Porter; Hardy Jr. (D)	J. Vaughan; Gary (D)	Watkins; Abbitt (D)	William M. Tuck (D)	Dick; Poff (R)	Burr; Harrison (D)	Howard W. Smith (D)	W. Pat; Jennings (D)	Joel; Broyhill (R)
88th (1963–1965)	Thomas N. Downing (D)	Porter; Hardy Jr. (D)	J. Vaughan; Gary (D)	Watkins; Abbitt (D)	William M. Tuck (D)	Dick; Poff (R)	John O. Marsh Jr. (D)	Howard W. Smith (D)	W. Pat; Jennings (D)	Joel; Broyhill (R)
89th (1965–1967)	Thomas N. Downing (D)	Porter; Hardy Jr. (D)	David E. Satterfield; III (D)	Watkins; Abbitt (D)	William M. Tuck (D)	Dick; Poff (R)	John O. Marsh Jr. (D)	Howard W. Smith (D)	W. Pat; Jennings (D)	Joel; Broyhill (R)
90th (1967–1969)	Thomas N. Downing (D)	Porter; Hardy Jr. (D)	David E. Satterfield; III (D)	Watkins; Abbitt (D)	William M. Tuck (D)	Dick; Poff (R)	John O. Marsh Jr. (D)	William L. Scott (R)	William C. Wampler (R)	Joel; Broyhill (R)
91st (1969–1971)	Thomas N. Downing (D)	G. William; Whitehurst (R)	David E. Satterfield; III (D)	Watkins; Abbitt (D)	Dan Daniel (D)	Dick; Poff (R)	John O. Marsh Jr. (D)	William L. Scott (R)	William C. Wampler (R)	Joel; Broyhill (R)
92nd (1971–1973)	Thomas N. Downing (D)	G. William; Whitehurst (R)	David E. Satterfield; III (D)	Watkins; Abbitt (D)	Dan Daniel (D)	Dick; Poff (R)	J. Kenneth; Robinson (R)	William L. Scott (R)	William C. Wampler (R)	Joel; Broyhill (R)
92nd (1971–1973)	Thomas N. Downing (D)	G. William; Whitehurst (R)	David E. Satterfield; III (D)	Watkins; Abbitt (D)	Dan Daniel (D)	M. Caldwell; Butler (R)	J. Kenneth; Robinson (R)	William L. Scott (R)	William C. Wampler (R)	Joel; Broyhill (R)
93rd (1973–1975)	Thomas N. Downing (D)	G. William; Whitehurst (R)	David E. Satterfield; III (D)	Robert; Daniel (R)	Dan Daniel (D)	M. Caldwell; Butler (R)	J. Kenneth; Robinson (R)	Stan Parris (R)	William C. Wampler (R)	Joel; Broyhill (R)
94th (1975–1977)	Thomas N. Downing (D)	G. William; Whitehurst (R)	David E. Satterfield; III (D)	Robert; Daniel (R)	Dan Daniel (D)	M. Caldwell; Butler (R)	J. Kenneth; Robinson (R)	Herbert Harris (D)	William C. Wampler (R)	Joe; Fisher (D)
95th (1977–1979)	Paul Trible (R)	G. William; Whitehurst (R)	David E. Satterfield; III (D)	Robert; Daniel (R)	Dan Daniel (D)	M. Caldwell; Butler (R)	J. Kenneth; Robinson (R)	Herbert Harris (D)	William C. Wampler (R)	Joe; Fisher (D)
96th (1979–1981)	Paul Trible (R)	G. William; Whitehurst (R)	David E. Satterfield; III (D)	Robert; Daniel (R)	Dan Daniel (D)	M. Caldwell; Butler (R)	J. Kenneth; Robinson (R)	Herbert Harris (D)	William C. Wampler (R)	Joe; Fisher (D)
97th (1981–1983)	Paul Trible (R)	G. William; Whitehurst (R)	Thomas J. Bliley Jr. (R)	Robert; Daniel (R)	Dan Daniel (D)	M. Caldwell; Butler (R)	J. Kenneth; Robinson (R)	Stan Parris (R)	William C. Wampler (R)	Frank Wolf (R)
98th (1983–1985)	Herb; Bateman (R)	G. William; Whitehurst (R)	Thomas J. Bliley Jr. (R)	Norman; Sisisky (D)	Dan Daniel (D)	Jim Olin (D)	J. Kenneth; Robinson (R)	Stan Parris (R)	Rick; Boucher (D)	Frank Wolf (R)
99th (1985–1987)	Herb; Bateman (R)	G. William; Whitehurst (R)	Thomas J. Bliley Jr. (R)	Norman; Sisisky (D)	Dan Daniel (D)	Jim Olin (D)	D. French; Slaughter (R)	Stan Parris (R)	Rick; Boucher (D)	Frank Wolf (R)
100th (1987–1989)	Herb; Bateman (R)	Owen B. Pickett (D)	Thomas J. Bliley Jr. (R)	Norman; Sisisky (D)	Dan Daniel (D)	Jim Olin (D)	D. French; Slaughter (R)	Stan Parris (R)	Rick; Boucher (D)	Frank Wolf (R)
100th (1987–1989)	Herb; Bateman (R)	Owen B. Pickett (D)	Thomas J. Bliley Jr. (R)	Norman; Sisisky (D)	L. F. Payne Jr. (D)	Jim Olin (D)	D. French; Slaughter (R)	Stan Parris (R)	Rick; Boucher (D)	Frank Wolf (R)
101st (1989–1991)	Herb; Bateman (R)	Owen B. Pickett (D)	Thomas J. Bliley Jr. (R)	Norman; Sisisky (D)	L. F. Payne Jr. (D)	Jim Olin (D)	D. French; Slaughter (R)	Stan Parris (R)	Rick; Boucher (D)	Frank Wolf (R)
102nd (1991–1993)	Herb; Bateman (R)	Owen B. Pickett (D)	Thomas J. Bliley Jr. (R)	Norman; Sisisky (D)	L. F. Payne Jr. (D)	Jim Olin (D)	D. French; Slaughter (R)	Jim Moran (D)	Rick; Boucher (D)	Frank Wolf (R)
102nd (1991–1993)	Herb; Bateman (R)	Owen B. Pickett (D)	Thomas J. Bliley Jr. (R)	Norman; Sisisky (D)	L. F. Payne Jr. (D)	Jim Olin (D)	George Allen (R)	Jim Moran (D)	Rick; Boucher (D)	Frank Wolf (R)

=== 1993 – present: 11 seats ===
In 1993, Virginia gained one more seat, with no subsequent changes since 2003.

Congress	District										
Congress	1st	2nd	3rd	4th	5th	6th	7th	8th	9th	10th	11th
103rd (1993–1995)	Herb; Bateman (R)	Owen B. Pickett (D)	Bobby; Scott (D)	Norman; Sisisky (D)	L. F. Payne Jr. (D)	Bob; Goodlatte (R)	Thomas J. Bliley Jr. (R)	Jim Moran (D)	Rick; Boucher (D)	Frank Wolf (R)	Leslie Byrne (D)
104th (1995–1997)	Herb; Bateman (R)	Owen B. Pickett (D)	Bobby; Scott (D)	Norman; Sisisky (D)	L. F. Payne Jr. (D)	Bob; Goodlatte (R)	Thomas J. Bliley Jr. (R)	Jim Moran (D)	Rick; Boucher (D)	Frank Wolf (R)	Tom Davis (R)
105th (1997–1999)	Herb; Bateman (R)	Owen B. Pickett (D)	Bobby; Scott (D)	Norman; Sisisky (D)	Virgil Goode (D)	Bob; Goodlatte (R)	Thomas J. Bliley Jr. (R)	Jim Moran (D)	Rick; Boucher (D)	Frank Wolf (R)	Tom Davis (R)
106th (1999–2001)	Herb; Bateman (R)	Owen B. Pickett (D)	Bobby; Scott (D)	Norman; Sisisky (D)	Virgil Goode (D)	Bob; Goodlatte (R)	Thomas J. Bliley Jr. (R)	Jim Moran (D)	Rick; Boucher (D)	Frank Wolf (R)	Tom Davis (R)
107th (2001–2003)	Jo Ann; Davis (R)	Ed Schrock (R)	Bobby; Scott (D)	Norman; Sisisky (D)	Virgil Goode (I)	Bob; Goodlatte (R)	Eric Cantor (R)	Jim Moran (D)	Rick; Boucher (D)	Frank Wolf (R)	Tom Davis (R)
107th (2001–2003)	Jo Ann; Davis (R)	Ed Schrock (R)	Bobby; Scott (D)	Randy; Forbes (R)	Virgil Goode (I)	Bob; Goodlatte (R)	Eric Cantor (R)	Jim Moran (D)	Rick; Boucher (D)	Frank Wolf (R)	Tom Davis (R)
108th (2003–2005)	Jo Ann; Davis (R)	Ed Schrock (R)	Bobby; Scott (D)	Randy; Forbes (R)	Virgil Goode (R)	Bob; Goodlatte (R)	Eric Cantor (R)	Jim Moran (D)	Rick; Boucher (D)	Frank Wolf (R)	Tom Davis (R)
109th (2005–2007)	Jo Ann; Davis (R)	Thelma Drake (R)	Bobby; Scott (D)	Randy; Forbes (R)	Virgil Goode (R)	Bob; Goodlatte (R)	Eric Cantor (R)	Jim Moran (D)	Rick; Boucher (D)	Frank Wolf (R)	Tom Davis (R)
110th (2007–2009)	Rob; Wittman (R)	Thelma Drake (R)	Bobby; Scott (D)	Randy; Forbes (R)	Virgil Goode (R)	Bob; Goodlatte (R)	Eric Cantor (R)	Jim Moran (D)	Rick; Boucher (D)	Frank Wolf (R)	Tom Davis (R)
111th (2009–2011)	Rob; Wittman (R)	Glenn Nye (D)	Bobby; Scott (D)	Randy; Forbes (R)	Tom Perriello (D)	Bob; Goodlatte (R)	Eric Cantor (R)	Jim Moran (D)	Rick; Boucher (D)	Frank Wolf (R)	Gerry; Connolly (D)
112th (2011–2013)	Rob; Wittman (R)	Scott Rigell (R)	Bobby; Scott (D)	Randy; Forbes (R)	Robert Hurt (R)	Bob; Goodlatte (R)	Eric Cantor (R)	Jim Moran (D)	Morgan; Griffith (R)	Frank Wolf (R)	Gerry; Connolly (D)
113th (2013–2015)	Rob; Wittman (R)	Scott Rigell (R)	Bobby; Scott (D)	Randy; Forbes (R)	Robert Hurt (R)	Bob; Goodlatte (R)	Eric Cantor (R)	Jim Moran (D)	Morgan; Griffith (R)	Frank Wolf (R)	Gerry; Connolly (D)
113th (2013–2015)	Rob; Wittman (R)	Scott Rigell (R)	Bobby; Scott (D)	Randy; Forbes (R)	Robert Hurt (R)	Bob; Goodlatte (R)	Dave Brat (R)	Jim Moran (D)	Morgan; Griffith (R)	Frank Wolf (R)	Gerry; Connolly (D)
114th (2015–2017)	Rob; Wittman (R)	Scott Rigell (R)	Bobby; Scott (D)	Randy; Forbes (R)	Robert Hurt (R)	Bob; Goodlatte (R)	Dave Brat (R)	Don Beyer (D)	Morgan; Griffith (R)	Barbara; Comstock (R)	Gerry; Connolly (D)
115th (2017–2019)	Rob; Wittman (R)	Scott Taylor (R)	Bobby; Scott (D)	Donald; McEachin (D)	Tom Garrett (R)	Bob; Goodlatte (R)	Dave Brat (R)	Don Beyer (D)	Morgan; Griffith (R)	Barbara; Comstock (R)	Gerry; Connolly (D)
116th (2019–2021)	Rob; Wittman (R)	Elaine Luria (D)	Bobby; Scott (D)	Donald; McEachin (D)	Denver Riggleman (R)	Ben Cline (R)	Abigail; Spanberger (D)	Don Beyer (D)	Morgan; Griffith (R)	Jennifer; Wexton (D)	Gerry; Connolly (D)
117th (2021–2023)	Rob; Wittman (R)	Elaine Luria (D)	Bobby; Scott (D)	Donald; McEachin (D)	Bob Good (R)	Ben Cline (R)	Abigail; Spanberger (D)	Don Beyer (D)	Morgan; Griffith (R)	Jennifer; Wexton (D)	Gerry; Connolly (D)
118th (2023–2025)	Rob; Wittman (R)	Jen Kiggans (R)	Bobby; Scott (D)	Jennifer; McClellan (D)	Bob Good (R)	Ben Cline (R)	Abigail; Spanberger (D)	Don Beyer (D)	Morgan; Griffith (R)	Jennifer; Wexton (D)	Gerry; Connolly (D)
119th (2025–2027)	Rob; Wittman (R)	Jen Kiggans (R)	Bobby; Scott (D)	Jennifer; McClellan (D)	John McGuire (R)	Ben Cline (R)	Eugene Vindman (D)	Don Beyer (D)	Morgan; Griffith (R)	Suhas; Subramanyam (D)	Gerry; Connolly (D)
119th (2025–2027)	Rob; Wittman (R)	Jen Kiggans (R)	Bobby; Scott (D)	Jennifer; McClellan (D)	John McGuire (R)	Ben Cline (R)	Eugene Vindman (D)	Don Beyer (D)	Morgan; Griffith (R)	Suhas; Subramanyam (D)	James; Walkinshaw (D)
120th (2027–2029)	Shannon; Taylor (D)	Elaine; Luria (D)	Bobby; Scott (D)	Jennifer; McClellan (D)	John McGuire (R)	Ben Cline (R)	Eugene Vindman (D)	Don Beyer (D)	Morgan; Griffith (R)	Suhas; Subramanyam (D)	James; Walkinshaw (D)

== Key ==
Anti-Administration (AA)
Conservative (Con)
Democratic (D)
Democratic-Republican (DR)
Federalist (F)
Pro-Administration (PA)
Independent Democrat (ID)
Jacksonian (J)
Know Nothing (KN)
National Republican (NR)
Opposition Southern (O)
Readjuster (RA)
Republican (R)
Union (U)
Whig (W)
Independent (I)

== See also ==
- List of United States congressional districts
- Virginia's congressional districts
- Political party strength in Virginia
