= William B. Oliver =

American politician (1867–1948)

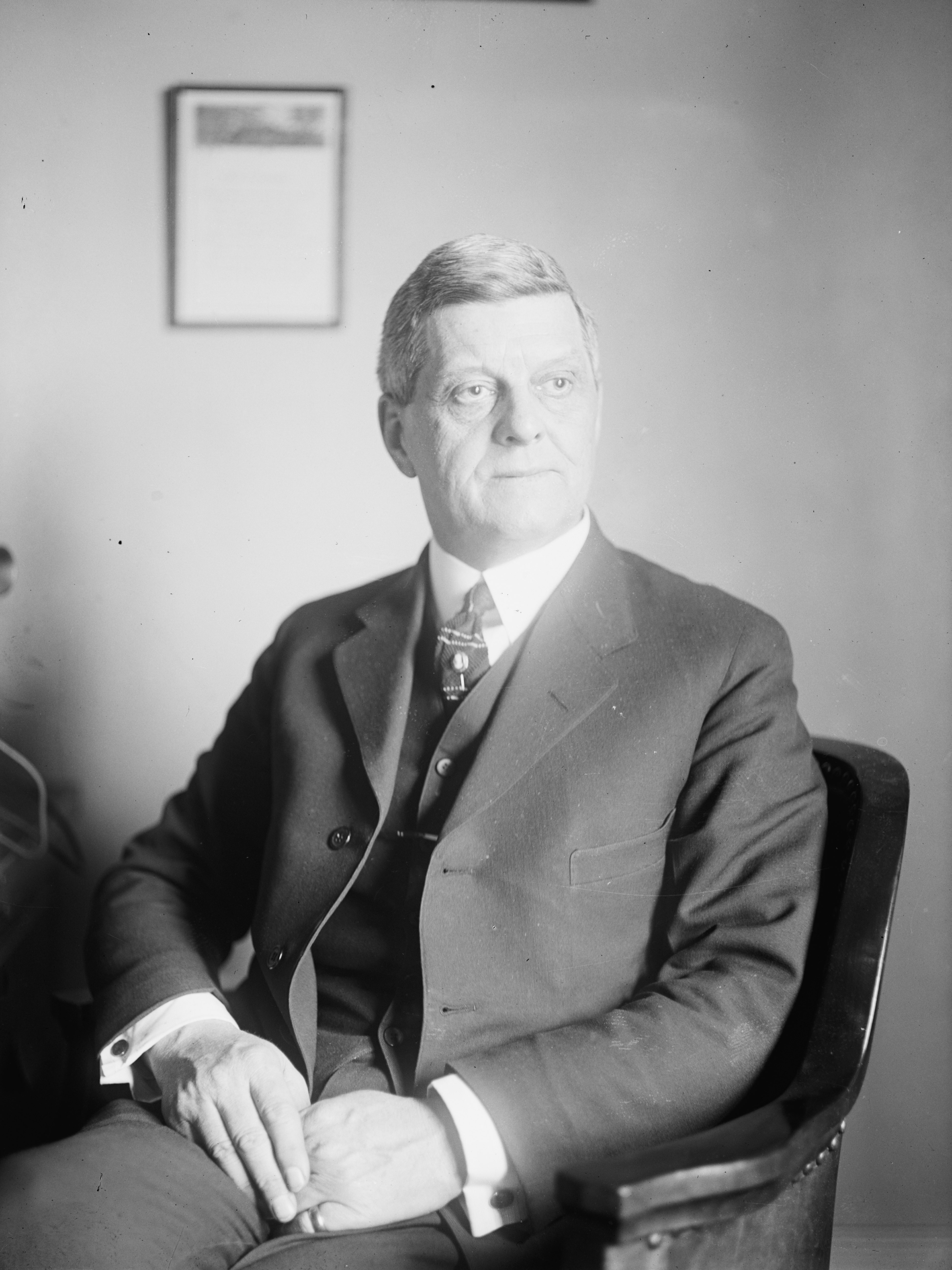
- Oliver in 1921

Member of the U.S. House of Representatives from Alabama's 6th district
- In office March 4, 1915 – January 3, 1937
- Preceded by: Richmond P. Hobson
- Succeeded by: Pete Jarman

Personal details
- Born: William Bacon Oliver; May 23, 1867 Eutaw, Alabama, US
- Died: May 27, 1948 (aged 81) New Orleans, Louisiana, US
- Party: Democratic
- Relations: Sydney Parham Epes (cousin)
- Occupation: Politician

William "Buck" Bacon Oliver (May 23, 1867 – May 27, 1948) was an American politician. A Democrat, he was a member of the United States House of Representatives from Alabama.

Born in Greene County, Alabama, Oliver studied at the University of Alabama and practiced law. He served eleven terms in the House of Representatives. Politically, his stances were syncretic, with him overall leaning liberal.

== Early life and education ==
Oliver was born on May 23, 1867, in Eutaw, Alabama, the son of judge William C. Oliver and Elizabeth S. (née Whitehead) Oliver. Lizzie was his father's second wife; his first wife was Elizabeth Phillips – with whom he had three children – had died. Through his father, he was the cousin of politician Sydney Parham Epes, and thereby a distant relative of James F. Epes.

Oliver was educated at common schools and attended Verner College Preparatory School, graduating in 1883. He studied at the University of Alabama's academic department, then at the University of Alabama School of Law, graduating in 1887 and 1889, respectively; he earned a Bachelor of Laws. He also took a course at the University of Virginia School of Law. He was a member of Phi Beta Kappa.

== Career ==
Oliver was admitted to the Alabama State Bar in 1889, after which he commenced practice in Tuscaloosa. From 1898 until his resignation in 1909, he was solicitor of the 6th Alabama Circuit Court. He was then Dean of the University of Alabama School of Law, from 1909 until his resignation in 1913.

Oliver (right) with Governor William W. Brandon, 1924

Oliver was a Democrat. For multiple years, he was chairman of the Tuscaloosa County central committee. In 1909, he unsuccessfully ran for the United States House of Representatives. He was a member of the United States House of Representatives from March 4, 1915, to January 3, 1937, representing Alabama's 6th district. He lost the following primaries. He was a delegate to the 1924 Democratic National Convention. From July 22, 1939, to May 1, 1944, he was assistant to the United States Attorney General. He then retired.

While in Congress, Oliver served on the Committees on Appropriations and on Naval Affairs. On September 16, 1922, he slapped New York's S. Wallace Dempsey twice in the jaw over a dispute regarding canal development; Oliver later apologized.

Politically, Oliver leaned liberal, such as in his support of government intervention to end the Great Depression, of labor rights, and of women's suffrage. However, he held conservative stances on issues such as immigration, Prohibition, and American involvement in World War I.

== Personal life and legacy ==
On February 20, 1937, Oliver married Beryl D. McCann. The two had known each other since at least 1919. He was Presbyterian. He was a member of the Benevolent and Protective Order of Elks, the Freemasons, the Knights of Pythias, the Knights Templar, and the Woodmen of the World.

Oliver died on May 27, 1948, aged 81, in New Orleans, from heart disease. He was buried on May 28, at Eutaw Cemetery. An archive of his papers is held by the University of Alabama School of Law. The William Bacon Oliver Lock and Dam and William Bacon Oliver Lake, both on the Black Warrior River, are named for him, with the name of the Lock and Dam coming from legislation introduced by Armistead I. Selden Jr.

U.S. House of Representatives
| Preceded by Richmond P. Hobson | Member of the U.S. House of Representatives from Alabama's 6th congressional district 1915–1937 | Succeeded by Pete Jarman |
