= Virginia's 4th congressional district =

U.S. House district for Virginia

Coordinates: 36°58′28″N 77°18′25″W

- Interactive map of district boundaries since 2023
- Representative: Jennifer McClellan; D–Richmond
- Distribution: 73.83% urban; 26.17% rural
- Population (2025): 812,085
- Median household income: $76,454
- Ethnicity: 42.1% White; 40.7% Black; 9.8% Hispanic; 4.0% Two or more races; 2.4% Asian; 1.0% other
- Cook PVI: D+17

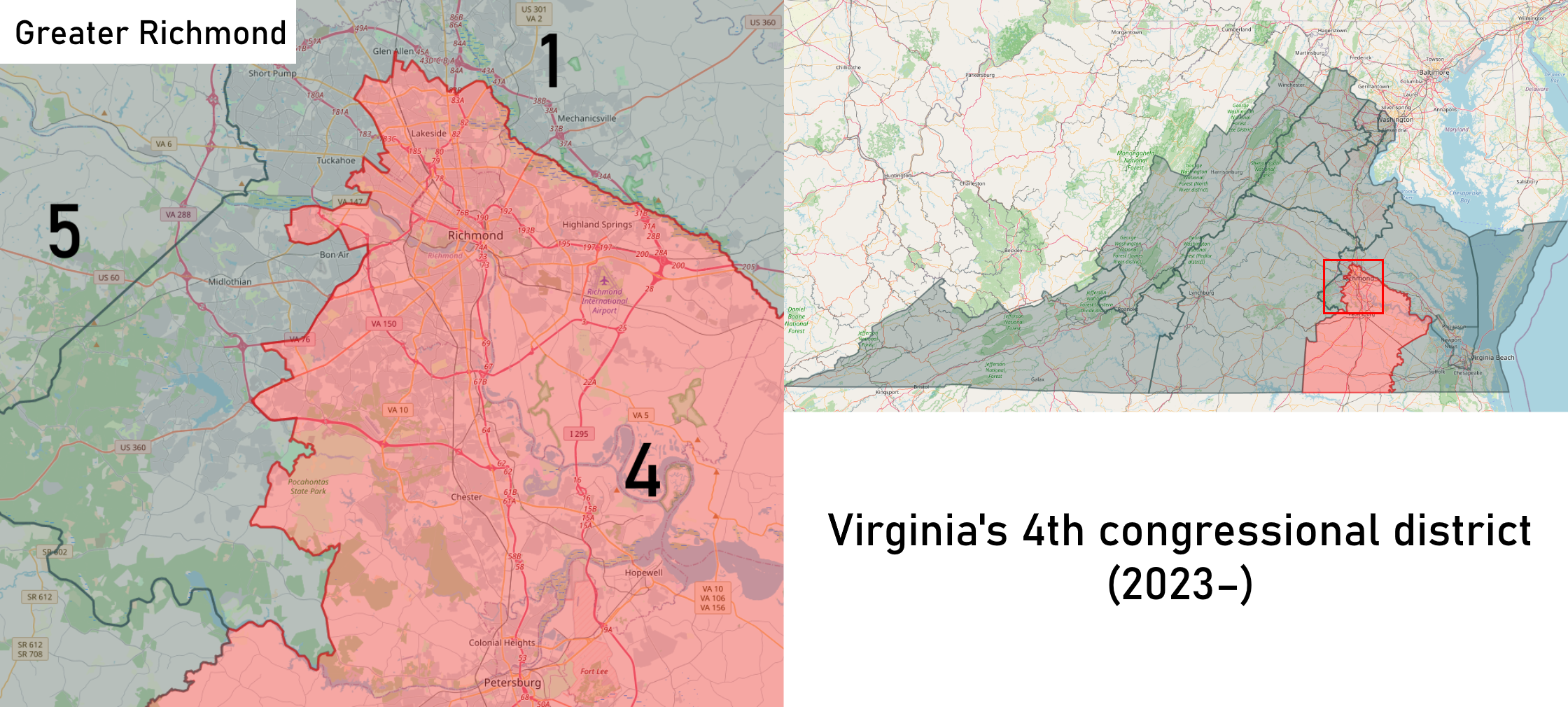
Virginia's 4th congressional district from January 3, 2023

Virginia's fourth congressional district is a majority-minority United States congressional district in the state of Virginia, taking in most of the area between Richmond and the North Carolina state line. It covers the entireties of Brunswick, Charles City, Dinwiddie, Greensville, Prince George, Surry, and Sussex counties, along with parts of Chesterfield, Henrico, and Southampton counties. The district also encompasses all of the independent cities of Colonial Heights, Emporia, Hopewell, Petersburg, and Richmond. The district is currently represented by Democrat Jennifer McClellan, who was elected to the seat in the 2023 Virginia's 4th congressional district special election, caused by the death of incumbent Democrat Donald McEachin on November 28, 2022.

In 2016, the adjacent 3rd district was found unconstitutional, leading court-ordered redistricting which transformed the 4th District from a Republican-leaning district to a safely Democratic seat for the 2016 elections.

== Recent election results ==
=== 2000s ===
2000 Virginia's 4th congressional district election
Party	Candidate	Votes	%
Democratic	Norman Sisisky (incumbent)	189,787	98.9
Write-ins		2,108	1.1
Total votes		191,895	100.00

2001 Virginia's 4th congressional district special election
Party	Candidate	Votes	%
Republican	Randy Forbes	70,917	52.0
Democratic	Louise Lucas	65,190	47.8
Write-ins		208	0.1
Total votes		136,315	100.00

2002 Virginia's 4th congressional district election
Party	Candidate	Votes	%
Republican	Randy Forbes (incumbent)	108,733	97.9
Write-ins		2,308	2.1
Total votes		111,041	100.00

2004 Virginia's 4th congressional district election
Party	Candidate	Votes	%
Republican	Randy Forbes (incumbent)	182,131	64.5
Democratic	Jonathan R. Menefee	100,162	35.8
Total votes		283,027	100.00

2006 Virginia's 4th congressional district election
Party	Candidate	Votes	%
Republican	Randy Forbes (incumbent)	150,967	76.12
Green	Albert P. Burckard	46,487	23.4
Total votes		198,340	100.00

2008 Virginia's 4th congressional district election
Party	Candidate	Votes	%
Republican	Randy Forbes (incumbent)	199,075	59.5
Democratic	Andrea Miller	135,041	23.4
Total votes		334,521	100.00

=== 2010s ===
2010 Virginia's 4th congressional district election
Party	Candidate	Votes	%
Republican	Randy Forbes (incumbent)	123,659	62.3
Democratic	Wynne LeGrow	74,298	37.5
Total votes		198,389	100.00

2012 Virginia's 4th congressional district election
Party	Candidate	Votes	%
Republican	Randy Forbes (incumbent)	199,292	56.9
Democratic	Ella Ward	150,190	42.9
Total votes		350,046	100.00

2014 Virginia's 4th congressional district election
Party	Candidate	Votes	%
Republican	Randy Forbes (incumbent)	120,684	60.2
Democratic	Elliott Fausz	75,270	37.5
Libertarian	Bo Brown	4,427	2.2

2016 Virginia's 4th congressional district election
Party	Candidate	Votes	%
Democratic	Donald McEachin	200,136	57.7
Republican	Mike Wade	145,731	42.0
Total votes		346,656	100.00

2018 Virginia's 4th congressional district election
Party	Candidate	Votes	%
Democratic	Donald McEachin (incumbent)	187,642	62.6
Republican	Ryan McAdams	107,706	35.9
Total votes		299,854	100.00

=== 2020s ===
2020 Virginia's 4th congressional district election
Party	Candidate	Votes	%
Democratic	Donald McEachin (incumbent)	240,510	61.6
Republican	Leon Benjamin	149,481	38.3
Total votes		389,991	100.00

2022 Virginia's 4th congressional district election
Party	Candidate	Votes	%
Democratic	Donald McEachin (incumbent)	159,044	65.0
Republican	Leon Benjamin	85,503	35.0
Write-in		431	0.2
Total votes		245,046	100.00

2023 Virginia's 4th congressional district special election
Party	Candidate	Votes	%
Democratic	Jennifer McClellan	82,040	74.4
Republican	Leon Benjamin	28,083	25.5
Write-In	Write In	129	0.1
Total votes		110,252	100.00

2024 Virginia's 4th congressional district election
Party	Candidate	Votes	%
Democratic	Jennifer McClellan (incumbent)	252,885	67.3
Republican	Bill Moher	121,814	32.4
Write-in		809	0.2
Total votes		375,508	100.0
Democratic hold			

== Recent election results from statewide races ==
Year	Office	Results
2008	President	Obama 65% - 34%
2008	Senate	Warner 73% - 26%
2009	Governor	Deeds 53% - 47%
2009	Lt. Governor	Wagner 54% - 45%
2009	Attorney General	Shannon 52% - 48%
2012	President	Obama 65% - 34%
2012	Senate	Kaine 66% - 34%
2013	Governor	McAuliffe 60% - 31%
2013	Lt. Governor	Northam 69% - 30%
2013	Attorney General	Herring 64% - 36%
2014	Senate	Warner 63% - 35%
2016	President	Clinton 63% - 32%
2017	Governor	Northam 66% - 33%
2017	Lt. Governor	Fairfax 66% - 34%
2017	Attorney General	Herring 66% - 34%
2018	Senate	Kaine 69% - 29%
2020	President	Biden 67% - 31%
2020	Senate	Warner 69% - 31%
2021	Governor	McAuliffe 61% - 37%
2021	Lt. Governor	Ayala 62% - 37%
2021	Attorney General	Herring 63% - 37%
2024	President	Harris 65% - 33%
2024	Senate	Kaine 68% - 32%
2025	Governor	Spanberger 71% - 29%
2025	Lt. Governor	Hashmi 69% - 31%
2025	Attorney General	Jones 67% - 33%

== Composition ==
For the 118th and successive Congresses (based on redistricting following the 2020 census), the district contains all or portions of the following counties and communities:

Brunswick County (6)

All 6 communities

Charles City County (1)

Charles City

Chesterfield County (7)

Bellwood, Bensley, Chester, Enon, Ettrick, Matoaca, Meadowbrook

Dinwiddie County (2)

Dinwiddie, McKenney

Greensville County (1)

Jarratt (shared with Sussex County)

Henrico County (9)

Chamberlayne, Dumbarton, East Highland Park, Glen Allen (part; also 1st), Highland Springs, Lakeside, Laurel, Montrose, Sandston

Prince George County (4)

All 4 communities

Southampton County (4)

Boykins, Branchville, Capron, Newsoms

Surry County (4)

All 4 communities

Sussex County (5)

All 5 communities

Independent cities (5)

Colonial Heights, Emporia, Hopewell, Petersburg, Richmond

== List of members representing the district ==
Representative	Party	Term	Cong ress	Electoral history
District established March 4, 1789
Richard B. Lee (Chantilly)	Pro-Administration	March 4, 1789 – March 3, 1793	1st 2nd	Elected in 1789. Re-elected in 1790. Redistricted to the 17th district.
Francis Preston (Abingdon)	Anti-Administration	March 4, 1793 – March 3, 1795	3rd 4th	Elected in 1793. Results were challenged but upheld. Re-elected in 1795. Retired.
Francis Preston (Abingdon)	Democratic-Republican	March 4, 1795 – March 3, 1797	3rd 4th	Elected in 1793. Results were challenged but upheld. Re-elected in 1795. Retired.
Abram Trigg (Montgomery County)	Democratic-Republican	March 4, 1797 – March 3, 1803	5th 6th 7th	Elected in 1797. Re-elected in 1799. Re-elected in 1801. Redistricted to the 6th district.
David Holmes (Winchester)	Democratic-Republican	March 4, 1803 – March 3, 1809	8th 9th 10th	Redistricted from the 2nd district and re-elected in 1803. Re-elected in 1805. Re-elected in 1807. Retired.
Jacob Swoope (Staunton)	Federalist	March 4, 1809 – March 3, 1811	11th	Elected in 1809. Retired.
William McCoy (Franklin)	Democratic-Republican	March 4, 1811 – March 3, 1823	12th 13th 14th 15th 16th 17th	Elected in 1811. Re-elected in 1813. Re-elected in 1815. Re-elected in 1817. Re-elected in 1819. Re-elected in 1821. Redistricted to the 19th district.
Mark Alexander (Lombardy Grove)	Democratic-Republican	March 4, 1823 – March 3, 1825	18th 19th 20th 21st 22nd	Redistricted from the 18th district and re-elected in 1823. Re-elected in 1825. Re-elected in 1827. Re-elected in 1829. Re-elected in 1831. Retired.
Mark Alexander (Lombardy Grove)	Jackson	March 4, 1825 – March 3, 1833	18th 19th 20th 21st 22nd	Redistricted from the 18th district and re-elected in 1823. Re-elected in 1825. Re-elected in 1827. Re-elected in 1829. Re-elected in 1831. Retired.
James Gholson (Percivals)	Anti-Jackson	March 4, 1833 – March 3, 1835	23rd	Elected in 1833. Lost re-election.
George Dromgoole (Cholsonville)	Jackson	March 4, 1835 – March 3, 1837	24th 25th 26th	Elected in 1835. Re-elected in 1837. Re-elected in 1839. Retired.
George Dromgoole (Cholsonville)	Democratic	March 4, 1837 – March 3, 1841	24th 25th 26th	Elected in 1835. Re-elected in 1837. Re-elected in 1839. Retired.
William Goode (Boydton)	Democratic	March 4, 1841 – March 3, 1843	27th	Elected in 1841. Retired.
Edmund W. Hubard (Curdsville)	Democratic	March 4, 1843 – March 3, 1847	28th 29th	Redistricted from the 5th district and re-elected in 1843. Re-elected in 1845. Retired.
Thomas S. Bocock (Appomattox)	Democratic	March 4, 1847 – March 3, 1853	30th 31st 32nd	Elected in 1847. Re-elected in 1849. Re-elected in 1851. Redistricted to the 5th district.
William Goode (Boydton)	Democratic	March 4, 1853 – July 3, 1859	33rd 34th 35th 36th	Elected in 1853. Re-elected in 1855. Re-elected in 1857. Re-elected in 1859. Died.
Vacant		July 3, 1859 – December 6, 1859	36th	
Roger Pryor (Petersburg)	Democratic	December 7, 1859 – March 3, 1861	36th	Elected to finish Goode's term. Resigned.
District inactive		March 4, 1861 – January 25, 1870	36th 37th 38th 39th 40th 41st	Civil War and Reconstruction
George Booker (Martinsville)	Conservative	January 26, 1870 – March 3, 1871	41st	Elected in 1870. Lost re-election.
William H. H. Stowell (Burkeville)	Republican	March 4, 1871 – March 3, 1877	42nd 43rd 44th	Elected in 1870. Re-elected in 1872. Re-elected in 1874. Retired.
Joseph Jorgensen (Petersburg)	Republican	March 4, 1877 – March 3, 1883	45th 46th 47th	Elected in 1876. Re-elected in 1878. Re-elected in 1880. Retired.
Benjamin Hooper (Farmville)	Readjuster	March 4, 1883 – March 3, 1885	48th	Elected in 1882. Lost re-election.
James Brady (Petersburg)	Republican	March 4, 1885 – March 3, 1887	49th	Elected in 1884. Retired.
William E. Gaines (Burkeville)	Republican	March 4, 1887 – March 3, 1889	50th	Elected in 1886. Retired.
Edward Venable (Petersburg)	Democratic	March 4, 1889 – September 23, 1890	51st	Election invalidated.
John Langston (Petersburg)	Republican	September 23, 1890 – March 3, 1891	51st	Elected in 1890. Lost re-election.
James F. Epes (Blackstone)	Democratic	March 4, 1891 – March 3, 1895	52nd 53rd	Elected in 1890. Re-elected in 1892. Retired.
William McKenney (Petersburg)	Democratic	March 4, 1895 – May 2, 1896	54th	Election invalidated
Robert Thorp (Boydton)	Republican	May 2, 1896 – March 3, 1897	54th	Elected in 1896. Lost re-election.
Sydney Epes (Blackstone)	Democratic	March 4, 1897 – March 23, 1898	55th	Election invalidated.
Robert Thorp (Boydton)	Republican	March 23, 1898 – March 3, 1899	55th	Elected in 1898. Lost re-election.
Sydney Epes (Blackstone)	Democratic	March 4, 1899 – March 3, 1900	56th	Elected in 1898. Died.
Vacant		March 4, 1900 – April 18, 1900	56th	
Francis Lassiter (Petersburg)	Democratic	April 19, 1900 – March 3, 1903	56th 57th	Elected to finish Epes's term. Re-elected in 1900. Lost re-election.
Robert G. Southall (Amelia)	Democratic	March 4, 1903 – March 3, 1907	58th 59th	Elected in 1902. Re-elected in 1904. Lost re-election.
Francis Lassiter (Petersburg)	Democratic	March 4, 1907 – October 31, 1909	60th 61st	Elected in 1906. Re-elected in 1908. Died.
Vacant		November 1, 1909 – March 7, 1910	61st	
Robert Turnbull (Lawrenceville)	Democratic	March 8, 1910 – March 3, 1913	61st 62nd	Elected to finish Lassiter's term. Re-elected in 1910. Lost re-election.
Walter Watson (Jennings Ordinary)	Democratic	March 4, 1913 – December 24, 1919	63rd 64th 65th 66th	Elected in 1912. Re-elected in 1914. Re-elected in 1916. Re-elected in 1918. Died.
Vacant		December 25, 1919 – April 26, 1920	66th	
Patrick Drewry (Petersburg)	Democratic	April 27, 1920 – March 3, 1933	66th 67th 68th 69th 70th 71st 72nd	Elected to finish Watson's term. Re-elected in 1920. Re-elected in 1922. Re-elected in 1924. Re-elected in 1926. Re-elected in 1928. Re-elected in 1930. Redistricted to the at-large seat.
District inactive		March 4, 1933 – January 3, 1935	73rd	
Patrick Drewry (Petersburg)	Democratic	January 3, 1935 – December 21, 1947	74th 75th 76th 77th 78th 79th 80th	Elected in 1934. Re-elected in 1936. Re-elected in 1938. Re-elected in 1940. Re-elected in 1942. Re-elected in 1944. Re-elected in 1946. Died.
Vacant		December 21, 1947 – February 17, 1948	80th	
Watkins Abbitt (Appomattox)	Democratic	February 17, 1948 – January 3, 1973	80th 81st 82nd 83rd 84th 85th 86th 87th 88th 89th 90th 91st 92nd	Elected to finish Drewry's term. Re-elected in 1948. Re-elected in 1950. Re-elected in 1952. Re-elected in 1954. Re-elected in 1956. Re-elected in 1958. Re-elected in 1960. Re-elected in 1962. Re-elected in 1964. Re-elected in 1966. Re-elected in 1968. Re-elected in 1970. Retired.
Robert Daniel (Prince George)	Republican	January 3, 1973 – January 3, 1983	93rd 94th 95th 96th 97th	Elected in 1972. Re-elected in 1974. Re-elected in 1976. Re-elected in 1978. Re-elected in 1980. Lost re-election.
Norman Sisisky (Petersburg)	Democratic	January 3, 1983 – March 29, 2001	98th 99th 100th 101st 102nd 103rd 104th 105th 106th 107th	Elected in 1982. Re-elected in 1984. Re-elected in 1986. Re-elected in 1988. Re-elected in 1990. Re-elected in 1992. Re-elected in 1994. Re-elected in 1996. Re-elected in 1998. Re-elected in 2000. Died.
Vacant		March 29, 2001 – June 19, 2001	107th	
Randy Forbes (Chesapeake)	Republican	June 19, 2001 – January 3, 2017	107th 108th 109th 110th 111th 112th 113th 114th	Elected to finish Sisisky's term. Re-elected in 2002. Re-elected in 2004. Re-elected in 2006. Re-elected in 2008. Re-elected in 2010. Re-elected in 2012. Re-elected in 2014. Redistricted to the 2nd district and lost renomination.
Donald McEachin (Richmond)	Democratic	January 3, 2017 – November 28, 2022	115th 116th 117th	Elected in 2016. Re-elected in 2018. Re-elected in 2020. Re-elected in 2022, but died before next term began.
Vacant		November 28, 2022 – March 7, 2023	117th 118th	
Jennifer McClellan (Richmond)	Democratic	March 7, 2023 – present	118th 119th	Elected to finish McEachin's term. Re-elected in 2024. Re-elected in 2026.

== Historical district boundaries ==
The Virginia Fourth District started in 1788 covering the counties of Prince William, Stafford, Loudoun, Fairfax, King George and Fauquier.

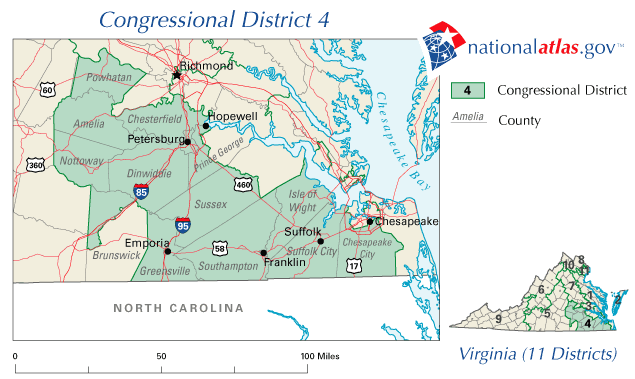
2003–2013

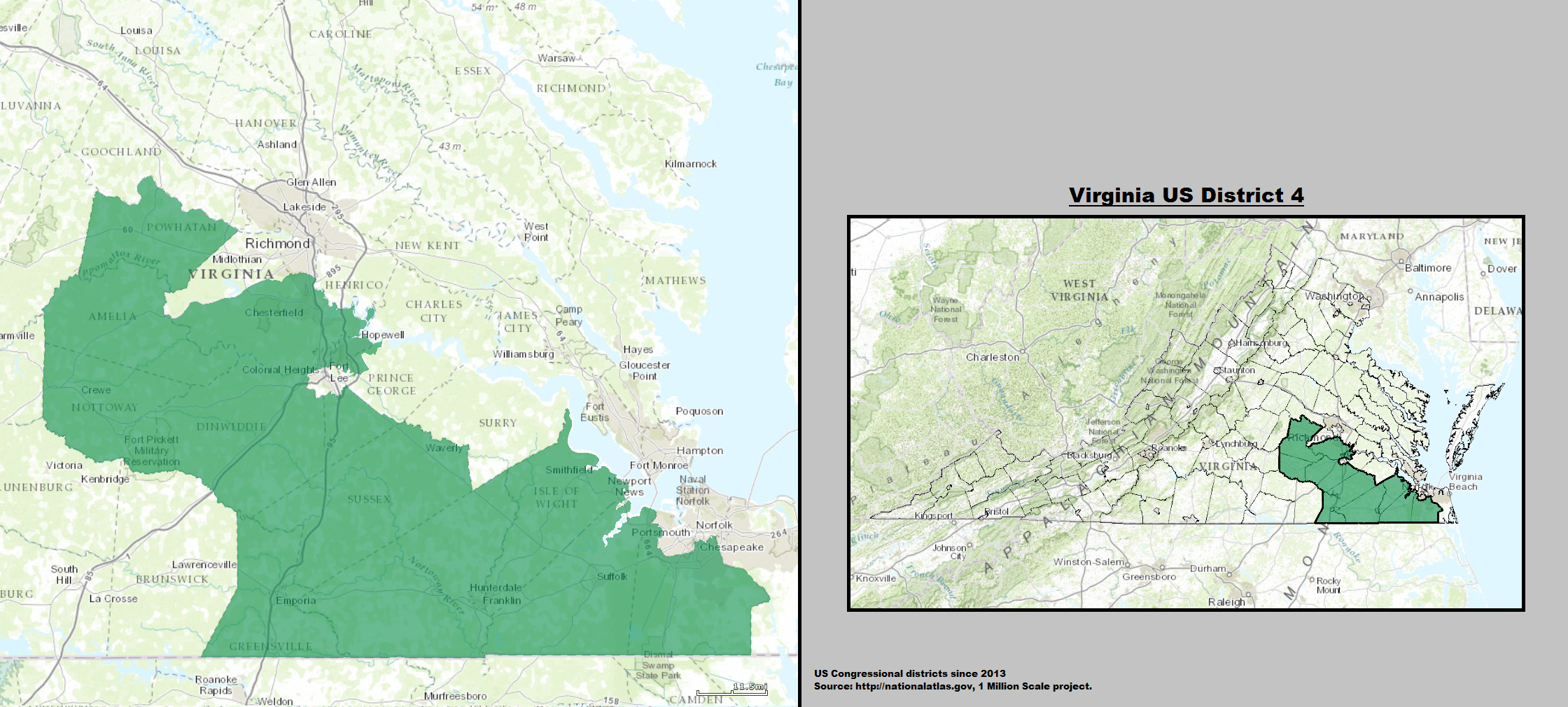
2013–2017

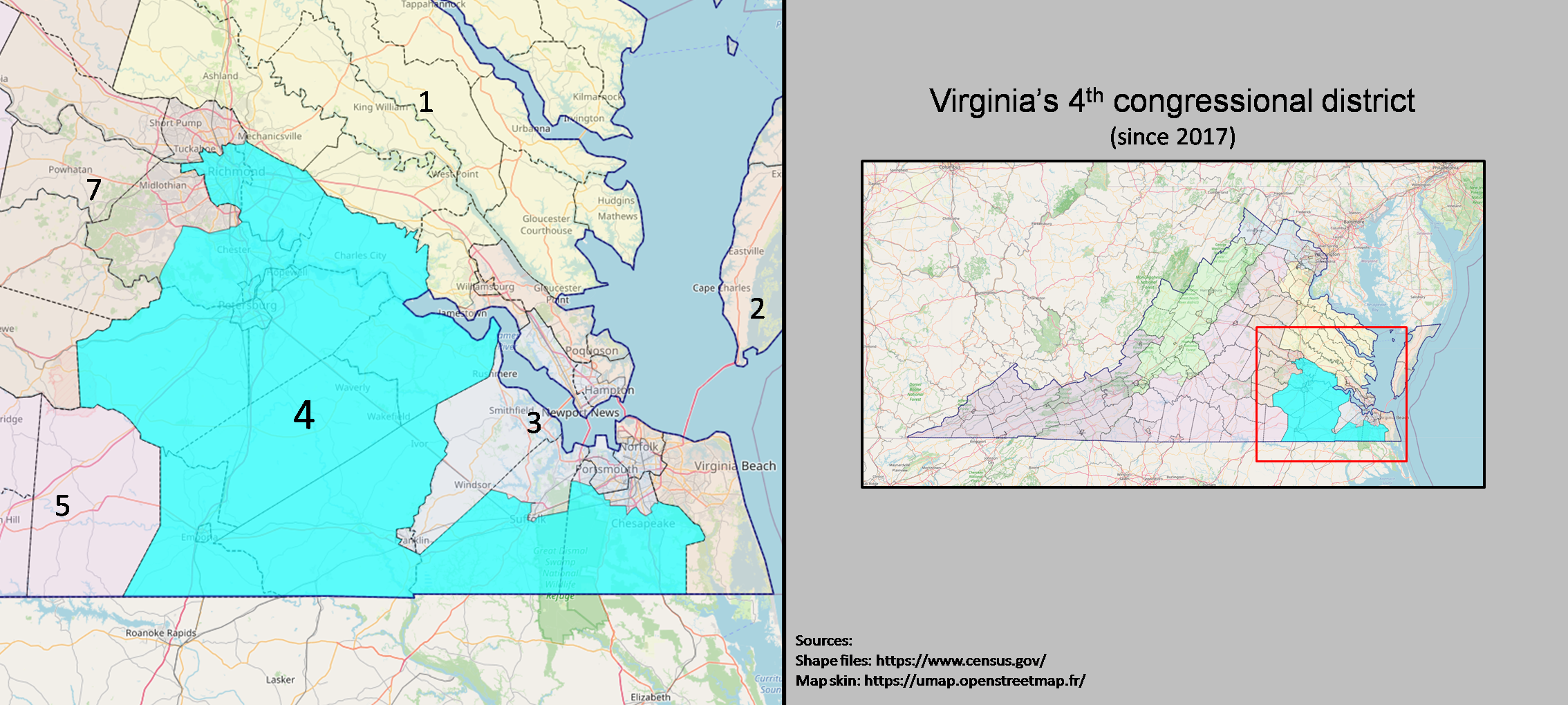
2017–2023

== See also ==
- Virginia's congressional districts
- List of United States congressional districts
