= Thomas G. Burch =

American politician

Thomas Granville Burch
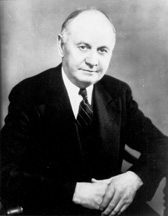

United States Senator from Virginia
- In office May 31, 1946 – November 5, 1946
- Appointed by: William M. Tuck
- Preceded by: Carter Glass
- Succeeded by: A. Willis Robertson

Member of the U.S. House of Representatives from Virginia's 5th district
- In office March 4, 1931 – May 31, 1946 at-large: March 4, 1933 – January 3, 1935
- Preceded by: Joseph Whitehead
- Succeeded by: Thomas B. Stanley

Personal details
- Born: July 3, 1869 Henry County, Virginia, U.S.
- Died: March 20, 1951 (aged 81) Martinsville, Virginia, U.S.
- Party: Democratic

Thomas Granville Burch (July 3, 1869 – March 20, 1951) was an American farmer, tobacco manufacturer, and politician from Martinsville, Virginia. He represented Virginia in the U.S. House of Representatives from 1931 until 1946. In 1946 he served as a U.S. senator after Carter Glass died in office until a successor was elected.

== Biography ==
Burch was born near the community of Dyer's Store in Henry County, Virginia. Early in his life, he worked as a farmer and for a tobacco manufacturing company. After his move to Martinsville, where he was elected mayor, Burch worked in banking, and later in the real estate and insurance businesses, owning a business devoted to both. Burch was elected as a Democrat to the 72nd Congress in 1931, and served until May 1946, when he was appointed to the United States Senate. Thomas 'Tom' Burch was married April 22, 1903 to Mary Ellen Anson, the daughter of Rev. Alfred W. Anson, an Episcopal priest born at Windsor Castle, son of Hon. Rev. Frederick Anson.

On March 20, 1951, Burch died of a heart attack in Martinsville and was buried in the city's Oakwood Cemetery.

== Elections ==
- 1930; Burch was elected to the U.S. House of Representatives unopposed.
- 1932; Burch was re-elected with the Democratic slate in Virginia's at-large Congressional district, he won 8.29% in a 24-way race.
- 1934; Burch was re-elected with 88.18% of the vote, defeating Republican Henry P. Wilder and Socialist Ira C. Wentz.
- 1936; Burch was re-elected with 64.96% of the vote, defeating Republican Taylor G. Vaughan.
- 1938; Burch was re-elected unopposed.
- 1940; Burch was re-elected unopposed.
- 1942; Burch was re-elected with 93.14% of the vote, defeating Socialist Howard Hearnes Carwile.
- 1944; Burch was re-elected with 84.61% of the vote, defeating now-Independent Carwile.

U.S. House of Representatives
Preceded by Joseph Whitehead	Member of the U.S. House of Representatives from Virginia's 5th congressional district 1931–1933	Succeeded by District abolished Himself after district re-established in 1935
Preceded by District re-established John S. Wise before district abolished in 1885	Member of the U.S. House of Representatives from Virginia's at-large congressional seat 1933–1935	Succeeded by District abolished
Preceded by District re-established Himself before district abolished in 1933	Member of the U.S. House of Representatives from Virginia's 5th congressional district 1935–1946	Succeeded by Thomas B. Stanley
U.S. Senate
Preceded by E. Carter Glass	U.S. senator (Class 2) from Virginia; 1946; Served alongside: Harry F. Byrd	Succeeded by A. Willis Robertson
