= Virginia's at-large congressional seat =

Former US congressional district

After the 1880 census, a tenth seat in the United States House of Representatives was added to Virginia's nine districts. For the 48th Congress (March 4, 1883 – March 4, 1885), that seat was elected at-large statewide. In 1885, Virginia redistricted its seats into ten geographic districts, thereby eliminating the at-large seat.

For the 73rd Congress (March 4, 1933 – January 3, 1935), Virginia elected all of its representatives at-large (i.e., statewide). The district format returned in the election to the 74th Congress (January 3, 1935 – January 3, 1937) and has remained in effect ever since.

== List of members representing the district ==
| Member | Party | Years | Cong ress | Electoral history |
|---|---|---|---|---|
District established March 4, 1883
| John S. Wise (Richmond) | Readjuster | March 4, 1883 – March 3, 1885 | 48th | Elected in 1882. Retired. |
District dissolved March 3, 1885
District re-established March 4, 1933
| S. Otis Bland (Newport News) | Democratic | March 4, 1933 – January 3, 1935 | 73rd | Elected in 1932. Redistricted from and to the 1st district. |
| Colgate Darden (Norfolk) | Democratic | March 4, 1933 – January 3, 1935 | 73rd | Elected in 1932. Redistricted to the 2nd district. |
| Andrew J. Montague (Richmond) | Democratic | March 4, 1933 – January 3, 1935 | 73rd | Elected in 1932. Redistricted from and to the 3rd district. |
| Patrick H. Drewry (Petersburg) | Democratic | March 4, 1933 – January 3, 1935 | 73rd | Elected in 1932. Redistricted from and to the 4th district. |
| Thomas G. Burch (Martinsville) | Democratic | March 4, 1933 – January 3, 1935 | 73rd | Elected in 1932. Redistricted from and to the 5th district. |
| Clifton A. Woodrum (Roanoke) | Democratic | March 4, 1933 – January 3, 1935 | 73rd | Elected in 1932. Redistricted from and to the 6th district. |
| A. Willis Robertson (Lexington) | Democratic | March 4, 1933 – January 3, 1935 | 73rd | Elected in 1932. Redistricted to the 7th district. |
| Howard W. Smith (Alexandria) | Democratic | March 4, 1933 – January 3, 1935 | 73rd | Elected in 1932. Redistricted from and to the 8th district. |
| John W. Flannagan Jr. (Bristol) | Democratic | March 4, 1933 – January 3, 1935 | 73rd | Elected in 1932. Redistricted from and to the 9th district. |
District dissolved January 3, 1935
