= William Robertson McKenney =

American politician (1851–1916)

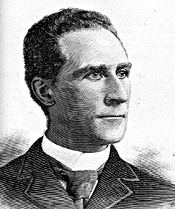

Member of the U.S. House of Representatives from Virginia's 4th district
- In office March 4, 1895 – May 2, 1896
- Preceded by: James F. Epes
- Succeeded by: Robert T. Thorp

Personal details
- Born: December 2, 1851 Petersburg, Virginia
- Died: January 3, 1916 (aged 64) Petersburg, Virginia
- Resting place: Blandford Cemetery, Petersburg, Virginia
- Party: Democratic
- Education: University of Virginia
- Profession: lawyer

William Robertson McKenney (December 2, 1851 – January 3, 1916) was a lawyer and U.S. Representative from Virginia.

== Biography ==
Born in Petersburg, Virginia, Mckenney was the son of Robert Armstrong and Virginia Bland Robertson McKenney. He attended McCabe's University School at Petersburg and the University of Virginia at Charlottesville. He taught school. He graduated from the law school of the University of Virginia in June 1876. He was admitted to the bar and practiced in Petersburg, Virginia. On December 2, 1878, McKenney married Clara J. Pickrell. Among their children were, Anne Pickrell, William Robertson, Clara Justine, and Virginia Spotswood.

McKenney was elected president of the city council of Petersburg in 1888 and served six years. He served as delegate to the Democratic National Convention in 1892. He served as member of the Democratic State executive committee, and presented credentials as a Democratic Member-elect to the Fifty-fourth Congress and served from March 4, 1895, to May 2, 1896, when he was succeeded by Robert T. Thorp, who successfully contested his election. He resumed the practice of law in Petersburg, Virginia. Unlike many alumni, McKenney supported the establishment of a co-ordinate college for women at the University of Virginia.

William Robertson McKenney died in Petersburg on January 3, 1916. He was interred in Blandford Cemetery.

In 1923, Clara J. McKenney deeded property to the city of Petersburg for a public library that would serve as memorial to her husband, William R. McKenney. The basement of the building was designated for Black citizens, and the upper floors for Whites. In February and March 1960, the segregated library facilities became the site of civil rights protests at which the Rev. Wyatt Tee Walker, the Rev. R. G. Williams, Mrs. Cassie L. Walker and a number of college and high school students were arrested. William and Clara McKenney's daughter, Virginia McKenney Claiborne, wrote two letters to Mayor Walter Edens urging the city council to desegregate the library. The effort was ultimately successful, and the William R. McKenney library became the first integrated public building in Petersburg. In late 2021, plans were announced to transform the building into an African American history museum.

== Electoral history ==
- 1894; McKenney was elected to the U.S. House of Representatives with 48.05% of the vote, defeating Republican Robert Taylor Thorp, Independents J. Haskins Hobson and Lee Thornton, and Populist B.R. Horner; however, Thorp successfully contested the results and was seated.

== Sources ==
- United States Congress. "William Robertson McKenney (id: M000502)". Biographical Directory of the United States Congress.

U.S. House of Representatives
| Preceded by James F. Epes | Member of the U.S. House of Representatives from Virginia's 4th congressional district 1895–1896 | Succeeded by Robert T. Thorp |
