= Sydney Parham Epes =

American politician (1865–1900)

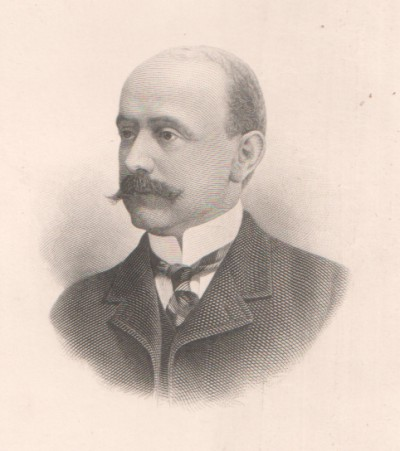

Member of the U.S. House of Representatives from Virginia's 4th district
- In office March 4, 1899 – March 3, 1900
- Preceded by: Robert T. Thorp
- Succeeded by: Francis R. Lassiter
- In office March 4, 1897 – March 23, 1898
- Preceded by: Robert T. Thorp
- Succeeded by: Robert T. Thorp

Member of the Virginia House of Delegates from Amelia and Nottoway Counties
- In office 1892–1893
- Preceded by: Henry Johnson
- Succeeded by: R.T. Vaughan

Personal details
- Born: August 20, 1865 Nottoway Court House, Virginia
- Died: March 3, 1900 (aged 34) Washington, D.C.
- Resting place: Lake View Cemetery, Blackstone, Virginia
- Party: Democratic
- Profession: lawyer

Sydney Parham Epes (August 20, 1865 – March 3, 1900) was a U.S. representative from Virginia, serving briefly for parts of two terms at the end of the 19th century.

He was the cousin of James F. Epes and William Bacon Oliver.

== Biography ==
Born near Nottoway Court House, Virginia, Epes moved with his parents to Kentucky and settled near Franklin, Kentucky, where he attended the public schools. He returned to Virginia in 1884 and edited and published a Democratic newspaper at Blackstone, Virginia.

=== Political career ===
He served as member of the Virginia House of Delegates in 1891 and 1892. He served as register of the Virginia land office from 1895 to 1897, and presented credentials as a Member-elect to the Fifty-fifth Congress and served from March 4, 1897, until March 23, 1898, when he was succeeded by Robert T. Thorp, who contested the election.

=== Congress and death ===
Epes was elected as a Democrat to the Fifty-sixth Congress and served from March 4, 1899, until his death from peritonitis in Washington, D.C., March 3, 1900. He was interred in Lake View Cemetery, Blackstone, Virginia.

== Elections ==
- 1896; Epes was elected to the U.S. House of Representatives with 54.5% of the vote, defeating Republican Robert Taylor Thorp and Independent Republican J.L. Thorp; however, the election was invalidated and Robert Taylor Thorp was seated.
- 1898; Epes was elected again with 57.5% of the vote, defeating Republicans Thorp and Booker Ellis, ColR (?) Thomas L. Jones, and Independent J.H. Beran.

== See also ==
- List of members of the United States Congress who died in office (1900–1949)

== Sources ==
- United States Congress. "Sydney Parham Epes (id: E000196)". Biographical Directory of the United States Congress.

U.S. House of Representatives
Preceded by Robert T. Thorp	Member of the U.S. House of Representatives from Virginia's 4th congressional district 1897–1898	Succeeded by Robert T. Thorp
Preceded by Robert T. Thorp	Member of the U.S. House of Representatives from Virginia's 4th congressional district 1899–1900	Succeeded by Francis R. Lassiter
