= Robert Taylor Thorp =

American politician

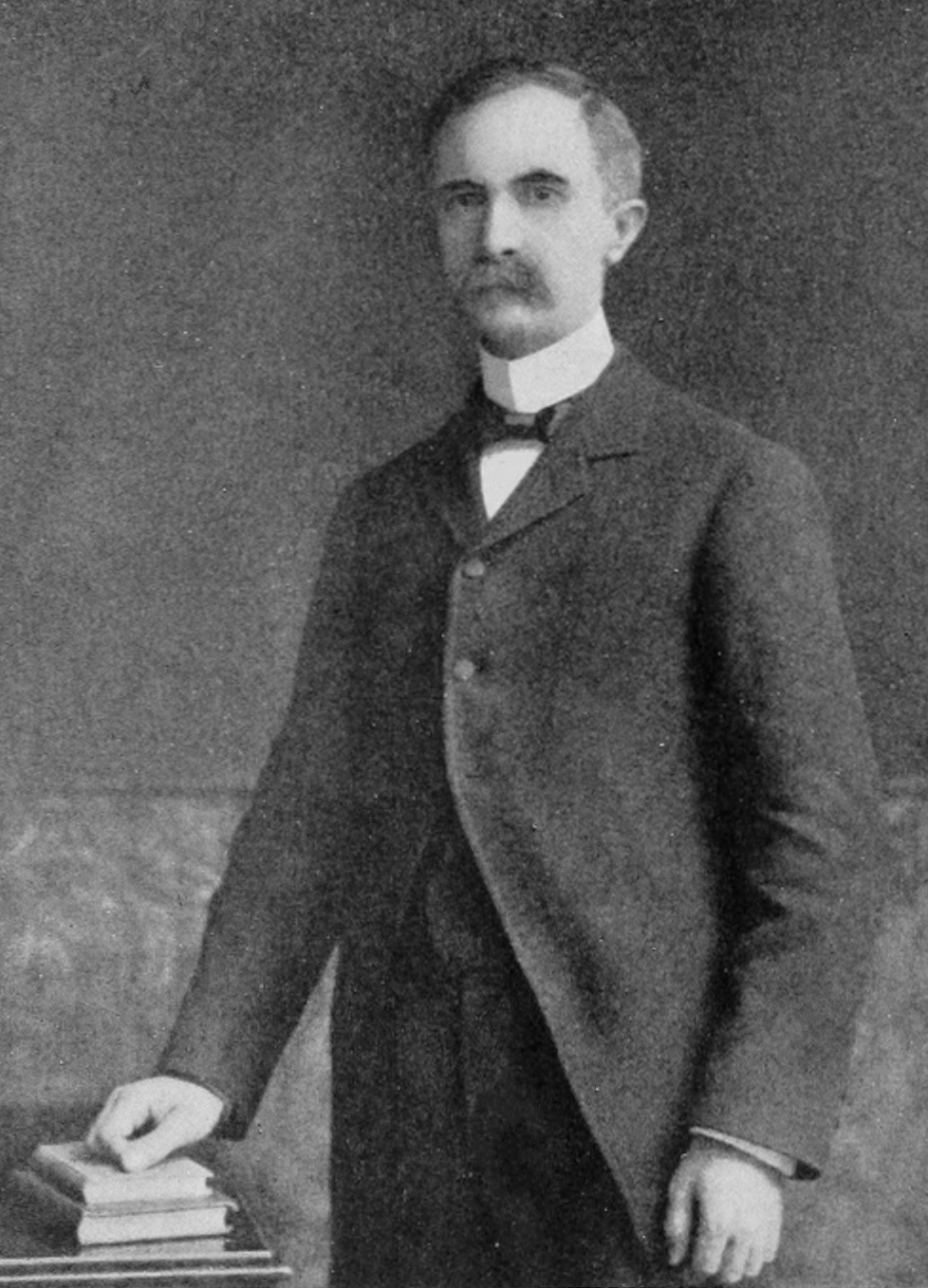

Member of the U.S. House of Representatives from Virginia's 4th district
- In office March 23, 1898 – March 3, 1899
- Preceded by: Sydney P. Epes
- Succeeded by: Sydney P. Epes
- In office May 2, 1896 – March 3, 1897
- Preceded by: William R. McKenney
- Succeeded by: Sydney P. Epes

Commonwealth's Attorney for Mecklenburg County
- In office 1877–1895
- Preceded by: Philip Lockett
- Succeeded by: E. Chambers Goode

Personal details
- Born: March 12, 1850 Oxford, North Carolina, U.S.
- Died: November 26, 1938 (aged 88) Virginia Beach, Virginia, U.S.
- Resting place: Forest Lawn Cemetery, Norfolk, Virginia
- Party: Republican
- Education: University of Virginia (LLB)
- Occupation: Lawyer; politician

Robert Taylor Thorp (March 12, 1850 – November 26, 1938) was a U.S. representative from Virginia.

== Biography ==
Born near Oxford, North Carolina, Thorp attended Horner Military Academy, Oxford, North Carolina, and was graduated from the law department of the University of Virginia at Charlottesville in 1870. He was admitted to the bar in 1870 and commenced practice in Boydton, Virginia, in 1871. Commonwealth attorney for that county 1877-1895. He successfully contested as a Republican the election of William R. McKenney to the Fifty-fourth Congress and served from May 2, 1896, to March 3, 1897. He successfully contested the election of Sydney P. Epes to the Fifty-fifth Congress and served from March 23, 1898, to March 4, 1899. He was an unsuccessful candidate for reelection in 1898 to the Fifty-sixth Congress. He moved to Norfolk, Virginia, and continued the practice of law. He moved to Virginia Beach, Virginia, in 1934 and died November 26, 1938. He was interred in Forest Lawn Cemetery, Norfolk, Virginia.

== Sources ==
- United States Congress. "Robert Taylor Thorp (id: T000244)". Biographical Directory of the United States Congress.

U.S. House of Representatives
Preceded by William R. McKenney	Member of the U.S. House of Representatives from Virginia's 4th congressional district 1896–1897	Succeeded by Sydney P. Epes
Preceded by Sydney P. Epes	Member of the U.S. House of Representatives from Virginia's 4th congressional district 1898–1899	Succeeded by Sydney P. Epes
