= James F. Epes =

American politician (1842–1910)

James Fletcher Epes
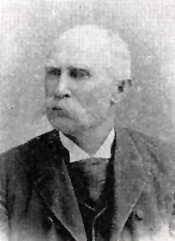

Member of the U.S. House of Representatives from Virginia's 4th district
- In office March 4, 1891 – March 3, 1895
- Preceded by: John M. Langston
- Succeeded by: William R. McKenney

Personal details
- Born: May 23, 1842 Blackstone, Virginia
- Died: August 24, 1910 (aged 68) "The Old Place," Blackstone, Virginia
- Party: Democratic
- Education: University of Virginia; Washington and Lee University
- Profession: lawyer

Military service
- Allegiance: Confederate States
- Branch/service: Confederate States Army
- Rank: Corporal
- Unit: 3rd Virginia Cavalry Regiment
- Battles/wars: American Civil War

James Fletcher Epes (May 23, 1842 – August 24, 1910) was a U.S. representative from Virginia, cousin of Sidney Parham Epes.

== Biography ==
Born near Blackstone, Virginia, Epes attended private schools and the University of Virginia at Charlottesville. During the Civil War he served in the Confederate States Army in Company E, Third Virginia Cavalry. He was graduated from the law department of Washington and Lee University, Lexington, Virginia, in 1867. He was admitted to the bar the same year and commenced practice at Nottoway Court House, Virginia. He also engaged in agricultural pursuits. He served as prosecuting attorney for Nottoway County during the years 1870–1883.

Epes was elected as a Democrat to the Fifty-second and Fifty-third Congresses (March 4, 1891 – March 3, 1895). He was not a candidate for renomination in 1894. He retired to his plantation, "The Old Place," near Blackstone, and engaged in agricultural pursuits until his death there August 24, 1910. He was interred in Lake View Cemetery, Blackstone, Virginia.

== Elections ==
- 1890; Epes was elected to the U.S. House of Representatives with 57.15% of the vote, defeating Republican John Mercer Langston.
- 1892; Epes was re-elected with 52.19% of the vote, defeating Populist J. Thomas Goode.

== Sources ==
- United States Congress. "James F. Epes (id: E000195)". Biographical Directory of the United States Congress.

U.S. House of Representatives
Preceded by John M. Langston	Member of the U.S. House of Representatives from Virginia's 4th congressional district 1891–1895	Succeeded by William R. McKenney
