= Virginia's 5th congressional district =

U.S. House district for Virginia

Coordinates: 37°3′31.8″N 79°5′11.2″W

- Interactive map of district boundaries since 2023
- Representative: John McGuire; R–Manakin Sabot
- Distribution: 64.7% rural; 35.3% urban
- Population (2025): 808,626
- Median household income: $76,198
- Ethnicity: 69.1% White; 20.7% Black; 5.3% Two or more races; 4.3% Hispanic; 2.5% other; 2.4% Asian
- Cook PVI: R+6
- Created: 1789

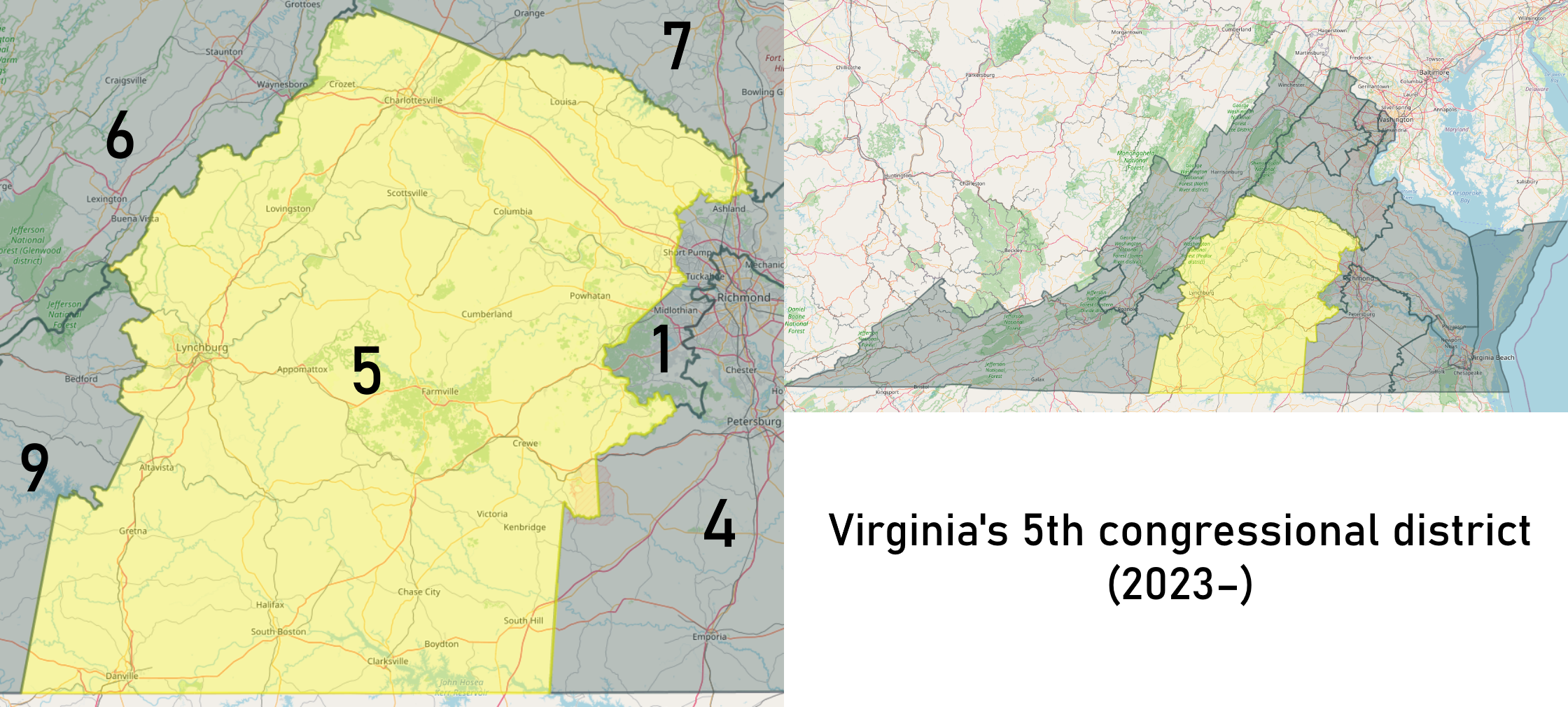
Virginia's 5th congressional district from January 3, 2023

Virginia's fifth congressional district is a United States congressional district in the commonwealth of Virginia. The 5th district includes the majority of rural Southside Virginia, though it stretches as far as the Richmond suburbs. Within the district are the cities of Charlottesville, Danville, and Lynchburg. It has been represented by Republican John McGuire since 2025.

The district's first representative in Congress was James Madison, who defeated James Monroe in the district's first congressional election. Madison and Monroe would go on to serve as the 4th and 5th Presidents of the United States. The current Congressman is Republican John McGuire.

Historically, the 5th was one of the first districts of Virginia to turn Republican in presidential elections. Southside was one of the fountainheads for the Byrd Organization, and the region's Democrats began splitting their tickets in presidential elections as early as the 1930s. Large portions of the area's limited and almost entirely white electorate who preferred conservative positions on black civil rights supported either Republicans or "States' Rights" nominees Strom Thurmond and Thomas Coleman Andrews. The district was to be one of two in Virginia which gave a plurality of the vote to segregationist George Wallace in 1968, and has never supported a Democrat for president since Harry S. Truman in 1948.

Despite this, the congressional seat long remained in the hands of Democrats who were very conservative even by Virginia standards. This ended in 1999, when Virgil Goode became an independent; he became a Republican in 2002. In 2008, Democrat Tom Perriello defeated Goode with significant Democratic down-ballot coattails from the Obama campaign. Republican Robert Hurt defeated Perriello in 2010, going on to serve three terms. After Hurt left office, the district continued to elect Republicans, including Tom Garrett, Denver Riggleman, who both served one term, and Bob Good, who was re-elected in 2022. However, Republican State Senator John McGuire successfully primaried Good in June 2024 and won the general election.

Redistricting after the 2020 census added Lynchburg to the district; most of its suburbs have been in the 5th for decades. It was also pushed as far east as Hanover County on Richmond's northern fringe.

== Demographics ==
According to the APM Research Lab's Voter Profile Tools (featuring the U.S. Census Bureau's 2019 American Community Survey), the district contained about 580,000 potential voters (citizens, age 18+). Of these, 75% are White and 20% are Black. Immigrants make up 3% of the district's potential voters. Median income among households (with one or more potential voter) in the district is about $57,700, while 12% of households live below the poverty line. As for the educational attainment of potential voters in the district, 12% of those 25 and older have not earned a high school degree, while 27% hold a bachelor's or higher degree.

== Area covered ==
For the 118th and successive Congresses (based on redistricting following the 2020 census), the district contains all or portions of the following counties and communities:

Albemarle County (15)

All 15 communities

Amelia County (1)

Amelia Court House

Amherst County (2)

Amherst, Madison Heights

Appomattox County (3)

All 3 communities

Bedford County (1)

Forest

Buckingham County (3)

All 3 communities

Campbell County (5)

All 5 communities

Charlotte County (4)

All 4 communities

Cumberland County (2)

Cumberland, Farmville (shared with Prince Edward County)

Fluvanna County (4)

All 4 communities

Goochland County (1)

Goochland

Halifax County (9)

All 9 communities

Hanover County (0)

No incorporated or census-recognized communities

Louisa County (3)

All 3 communities

Lunenberg County (3)

All 3 communities

Mecklenburg County (11)

All 11 communities

Nelson County (7)

All 7 communities

Nottoway County (4)

All 4 communities

Powhatan County (1)

Powhatan

Pittsylvania County (6)

All 6 communities

Prince Edward County (3)

All 3 communities

Independent cities (3)

Charlottesville, Danville, Lynchburg

== Recent election results from statewide races ==
Year	Office	Results
2008	President	McCain 52% - 47%
2008	Senate	Warner 61% - 37%
2009	Governor	McDonnell 63% - 37%
2009	Lt. Governor	Bolling 62% - 38%
2009	Attorney General	Cuccinelli 63% - 37%
2012	President	Romney 54% - 45%
2012	Senate	Allen 54% - 46%
2013	Governor	Cuccinelli 52% - 40%
2013	Lt. Governor	Jackson 51% - 48%
2013	Attorney General	Obenshain 58% - 42%
2014	Senate	Gillespie 54% - 43%
2016	President	Trump 53% - 42%
2017	Governor	Gillespie 54% - 45%
2017	Lt. Governor	Vogel 57% - 43%
2017	Attorney General	Donley Adams 56% - 44%
2018	Senate	Stewart 50% - 48%
2020	President	Trump 53% - 45%
2020	Senate	Gade 52% - 48%
2021	Governor	Youngkin 60% - 39%
2021	Lt. Governor	Earle-Sears 60% - 40%
2021	Attorney General	Miyares 60% - 40%
2024	President	Trump 55% - 43%
2024	Senate	Cao 55% - 45%
2025	Governor	Earle-Sears 54% - 46%
2025	Lt. Governor	Reid 55% - 45%
2025	Attorney General	Miyares 57% - 43%

== Recent election results ==
=== 2024 ===
2024 Virginia's 5th congressional district election

Republican John McGuire III, who had ousted Bob Good in the Republican primary, defeated Democrat Gloria Witt in the November general election on Tuesday, November 5, 2024.

Candidate	Party	Votes	Percentage
John McGuire III	Republican	249,564	57.26%
Gloria Witt	Democratic	184,229	42.27%
Write-in		2,046	0.47%
Total votes cast		435,839	100.0%

=== 2022 ===
2022 Virginia's 5th congressional district election

Incumbent Bob Good defeated Josh Throneburg in the November general election on Tuesday, November 8, 2022.

Candidate	Party	Votes	Percentage
Bob Good	Republican	177,191	57.57%
Josh Throneburg	Democratic	129,996	42.24%
Write-in		603	0.20%
Total votes cast		307,790	100.0%

=== 2020 ===
2020 Virginia's 5th congressional district election

Republican Bob Good defeated Dr. Cameron Webb in the November general election on Tuesday, November 3, 2020.

Candidate	Party	Votes	Percentage
Bob Good	Republican	210,988	52.6%
Cameron Webb	Democratic	190,315	47.4%
Total votes cast		401,303	100.0%

=== 2018 ===
2018 Virginia's 5th congressional district election

Took place on Tuesday, November 6, 2018, with Republican Denver Riggleman winning the election. The incumbent, Tom Garrett, did not run for re-election.

Candidate	Party	Votes	Percentage
Denver Riggleman	Republican	165,339	53.18%
Leslie Cockburn	Democratic	145,040	46.65%
All others	Write In	547	0.18%
Total votes cast		310,926	100.0%

=== 2016 ===
2016 Virginia's 5th congressional district election

Candidate	Party	Votes	Percentage
Tom Garrett	Republican	207,758	58.2%
Jane Dittmar	Democratic	148,339	41.6%
All others		668	0.2%
Total votes cast		356,765	100.0%

== List of members representing the district ==
Member	Party	Term	Cong ress	Electoral history
District established March 4, 1789
James Madison (Montpelier)	Anti-Administration	March 4, 1789 – March 3, 1793	1st 2nd	Elected in 1789. Re-elected in 1790. Redistricted to the 15th district.
George Hancock (Fotheringay)	Pro-Administration	March 4, 1793 – March 3, 1795	3rd 4th	Elected in 1793. Re-elected in 1795. Retired.
George Hancock (Fotheringay)	Federalist	March 4, 1795 – March 3, 1797	3rd 4th	Elected in 1793. Re-elected in 1795. Retired.
John J. Trigg (Liberty)	Democratic-Republican	March 4, 1797 – March 3, 1803	5th 6th 7th	Elected in 1797. Re-elected in 1799. Re-elected in 1801. Redistricted to the 13th district.
Thomas Lewis Jr. (Kanawha County)	Federalist	March 4, 1803 – March 5, 1804	8th	Election invalidated.
Andrew Moore (Lexington)	Democratic-Republican	March 5, 1804 – August 11, 1804	8th	Elected in 1804. Resigned when appointed U.S. senator.
Vacant		August 12, 1804 – December 3, 1804	8th	
Alexander Wilson	Democratic-Republican	December 4, 1804 – March 3, 1809	8th 9th 10th	Elected to finish Moore's term. Re-elected in 1805. Re-elected in 1807. Lost re-election.
James Breckinridge (Fincastle)	Federalist	March 4, 1809 – March 3, 1817	11th 12th 13th 14th	Elected in 1809. Re-elected in 1811. Re-elected in 1813. Re-elected in 1815. Retired.
John Floyd (Newbern)	Democratic-Republican	March 4, 1817 – March 3, 1823	15th 16th 17th	Elected in 1817. Re-elected in 1819. Re-elected in 1821. Redistricted to the 20th district.
John Randolph (Charlotte)	Democratic-Republican	March 4, 1823 – March 3, 1825	18th 19th	Redistricted from the 16th district and re-elected in 1823. Re-elected in 1825. Resigned when appointed U.S. senator.
John Randolph (Charlotte)	Jacksonian	March 4, 1825 – December 26, 1825	19th	Redistricted from the 16th district and re-elected in 1823. Re-elected in 1825. Resigned when appointed U.S. senator.
Vacant		December 27, 1825 – January 20, 1826	19th	
George W. Crump (Cumberland)	Jacksonian	January 21, 1826 – March 3, 1827	19th	Elected to finish Randolph's term. Retired.
John Randolph (Charlotte)	Jacksonian	March 4, 1827 – March 3, 1829	20th	Elected in 1827. Retired.
Thomas Bouldin (Charlotte)	Jacksonian	March 4, 1829 – March 3, 1833	21st 22nd	Elected in 1829. Re-elected in 1831. [data missing] Lost re-election.
John Randolph (Charlotte)	Jacksonian	March 4, 1833 – May 24, 1833	23rd	Elected in 1833. Died.
Vacant		May 25, 1833 – August 25, 1833	23rd	
Thomas Bouldin (Charlotte)	Jacksonian	August 26, 1833 – February 11, 1834	23rd	Elected to finish Randolph's term. Died.
Vacant		February 12, 1834 – March 14, 1834	23rd	
James Bouldin (Charlotte)	Jacksonian	March 15, 1834 – March 3, 1837	23rd 24th 25th	Elected to finish his brother's term. Re-elected in 1835. Re-elected in 1837. Retired.
James Bouldin (Charlotte)	Democratic	March 4, 1837 – March 3, 1839	23rd 24th 25th	Elected to finish his brother's term. Re-elected in 1835. Re-elected in 1837. Retired.
John Hill (Buckingham)	Whig	March 4, 1839 – March 3, 1841	26th	Elected in 1839. Lost re-election.
Edmund W. Hubard (Curdsville)	Democratic	March 4, 1841 – March 3, 1843	27th	Elected in 1841. Redistricted to the 4th district.
Thomas W. Gilmer (Charlottesville)	Democratic	March 4, 1843 – February 18, 1844	28th	Elected in 1843. Resigned to become U.S. Secretary of the Navy
Vacant		February 19, 1844 – May 9, 1844	28th	
William L. Goggin (Liberty)	Whig	May 10, 1844 – March 3, 1845	28th	Elected to finish Gilmer's term. Lost re-election.
Shelton Leake (Charlottesville)	Democratic	March 4, 1845 – March 3, 1847	29th	Elected in 1845. Lost re-election.
William L. Goggin (Liberty)	Whig	March 4, 1847 – March 3, 1849	30th	Elected in 1847. Lost re-election.
Paulus Powell (Amherst)	Democratic	March 4, 1849 – March 3, 1853	31st 32nd	Elected in 1849. Re-elected in 1851. Redistricted to the 6th district.
Thomas S. Bocock (Appomattox)	Democratic	March 4, 1853 – March 3, 1861	33rd 34th 35th 36th	Redistricted from the 4th district and re-elected in 1853. Re-elected in 1855. Re-elected in 1857. Re-elected in 1859. Resigned.
District inactive		March 4, 1861 – January 26, 1870	37th 38th 39th 40th 41st	Civil War and Reconstruction
Robert Ridgway (Cool Well)	Conservative	January 27, 1870 – October 16, 1870	41st	Elected in 1870. Died.
Vacant		October 17, 1870 – November 7, 1870	41st	
Richard T. W. Duke Sr. (Charlottesville)	Conservative	November 8, 1870 – March 3, 1871	41st 42nd	Elected to finish Ridgway's term. Re-elected in 1870. Lost re-election.
Richard T. W. Duke Sr. (Charlottesville)	Democratic	March 4, 1871 – March 3, 1873	41st 42nd	Elected to finish Ridgway's term. Re-elected in 1870. Lost re-election.
Alexander Davis (Independence)	Democratic	March 4, 1873 – March 5, 1874	43rd	Election invalidated.
Christopher Y. Thomas (Martinsville)	Republican	March 5, 1874 – March 3, 1875	43rd	Elected in 1874. Lost re-election.
George C. Cabell (Danville)	Democratic	March 4, 1875 – March 3, 1887	44th 45th 46th 47th 48th 49th	Elected in 1874. Re-elected in 1876. Re-elected in 1878. Re-elected in 1880. Re-elected in 1882. Re-elected in 1884. Lost re-election.
John R. Brown (Martinsville)	Republican	March 4, 1887 – March 3, 1889	50th	Elected in 1886. Lost re-election.
Posey G. Lester (Floyd)	Democratic	March 4, 1889 – March 3, 1893	51st 52nd	Elected in 1888. Re-elected in 1890. Retired.
Claude A. Swanson (Chatham)	Democratic	March 4, 1893 – January 30, 1906	53rd 54th 55th 56th 57th 58th 59th	Elected in 1892. Re-elected in 1894. Re-elected in 1896. Re-elected in 1898. Re-elected in 1900. Re-elected in 1902. Re-elected in 1904. Elected Governor of Virginia.
Vacant		January 31, 1906 – November 5, 1906	59th	
Edward W. Saunders (Rocky Mount)	Democratic	November 6, 1906 – February 29, 1920	59th 60th 61st 62nd 63rd 64th 65th 66th	Elected to finish Swanson's term. Re-elected in 1906. Re-elected in 1908. Re-elected in 1910. Re-elected in 1912. Re-elected in 1914. Re-elected in 1916. Re-elected in 1918. Resigned to become Virginia Supreme Court justice.
Vacant		March 1, 1920 – May 31, 1920	66th	
Rorer A. James (Danville)	Democratic	June 1, 1920 – August 6, 1921	66th 67th	Elected to finish Saunders's term. Re-elected in 1920. Died.
Vacant		August 7, 1921 – November 7, 1921	67th	
J. Murray Hooker (Stuart)	Democratic	November 8, 1921 – March 3, 1925	67th 68th	Elected to finish James's term. Re-elected in 1922. Retired.
Joseph Whitehead (Chatham)	Democratic	March 4, 1925 – March 3, 1931	69th 70th 71st	Elected in 1924. Re-elected in 1926. Re-elected in 1928. Lost re-election.
Thomas G. Burch (Martinsville)	Democratic	March 4, 1931 – March 3, 1933	72nd	Elected in 1930. Redistricted to the at-large seat.
District inactive		March 4, 1933 – January 3, 1935	73rd	
Thomas G. Burch (Martinsville)	Democratic	January 3, 1935 – May 31, 1946	74th 75th 76th 77th 78th 79th	Elected in 1934. Re-elected in 1936. Re-elected in 1938. Re-elected in 1940. Re-elected in 1942. Re-elected in 1944. Resigned when appointed U.S. senator.
Vacant		May 31, 1946 – November 5, 1946	79th	
Thomas B. Stanley (Stanleytown)	Democratic	November 5, 1946 – February 3, 1953	79th 80th 81st 82nd 83rd	Elected to finish Burch's term. Re-elected in 1946. Re-elected in 1948. Re-elected in 1950. Re-elected in 1952. Resigned to run for Governor of Virginia.
Vacant		February 3, 1953 – April 14, 1953	83rd	
William M. Tuck (South Boston)	Democratic	April 14, 1953 – January 3, 1969	83rd 84th 85th 86th 87th 88th 89th 90th	Elected to finish Stanley's term. Re-elected in 1954. Re-elected in 1956. Re-elected in 1958. Re-elected in 1960. Re-elected in 1962. Re-elected in 1964. Re-elected in 1966. Retired.
Dan Daniel (Danville)	Democratic	January 3, 1969 – January 23, 1988	91st 92nd 93rd 94th 95th 96th 97th 98th 99th 100th	Elected in 1968. Re-elected in 1970. Re-elected in 1972. Re-elected in 1974. Re-elected in 1976. Re-elected in 1978. Re-elected in 1980. Re-elected in 1982. Re-elected in 1984. Re-elected in 1986. Died.
Vacant		January 23, 1988 – June 14, 1988	100th	
Lewis F. Payne Jr. (Nellysford)	Democratic	June 14, 1988 – January 3, 1997	100th 101st 102nd 103rd 104th	Elected to finish Daniel's term. Re-elected in 1988. Re-elected in 1990. Re-elected in 1992. Re-elected in 1994. Retired.
Virgil H. Goode Jr. (Rocky Mount)	Democratic	January 3, 1997 – January 27, 2000	105th 106th 107th 108th 109th 110th	Elected in 1996. Re-elected in 1998. Re-elected in 2000. Re-elected in 2002. Re-elected in 2004. Re-elected in 2006. Lost re-election.
Virgil H. Goode Jr. (Rocky Mount)	Independent	January 27, 2000 – August 1, 2002	105th 106th 107th 108th 109th 110th	Elected in 1996. Re-elected in 1998. Re-elected in 2000. Re-elected in 2002. Re-elected in 2004. Re-elected in 2006. Lost re-election.
Virgil H. Goode Jr. (Rocky Mount)	Republican	August 1, 2002 – January 3, 2009	105th 106th 107th 108th 109th 110th	Elected in 1996. Re-elected in 1998. Re-elected in 2000. Re-elected in 2002. Re-elected in 2004. Re-elected in 2006. Lost re-election.
Tom Perriello (Charlottesville)	Democratic	January 3, 2009 – January 3, 2011	111th	Elected in 2008. Lost re-election.
Robert Hurt (Chatham)	Republican	January 3, 2011 – January 3, 2017	112th 113th 114th	Elected in 2010. Re-elected in 2012. Re-elected in 2014. Retired.
Tom Garrett (Ruckersville)	Republican	January 3, 2017 – January 3, 2019	115th	Elected in 2016. Retired.
Denver Riggleman (Afton)	Republican	January 3, 2019 – January 3, 2021	116th	Elected in 2018. Lost renomination.
Bob Good (Evington)	Republican	January 3, 2021 – January 3, 2025	117th 118th	Elected in 2020. Re-elected in 2022. Lost renomination.
John McGuire (Manakin Sabot)	Republican	January 3, 2025 – present	119th	Elected in 2024. Re-elected in 2026.

== Historical district boundaries ==
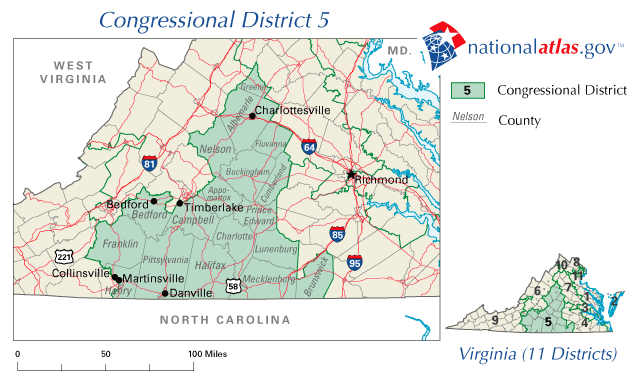
2003–2013

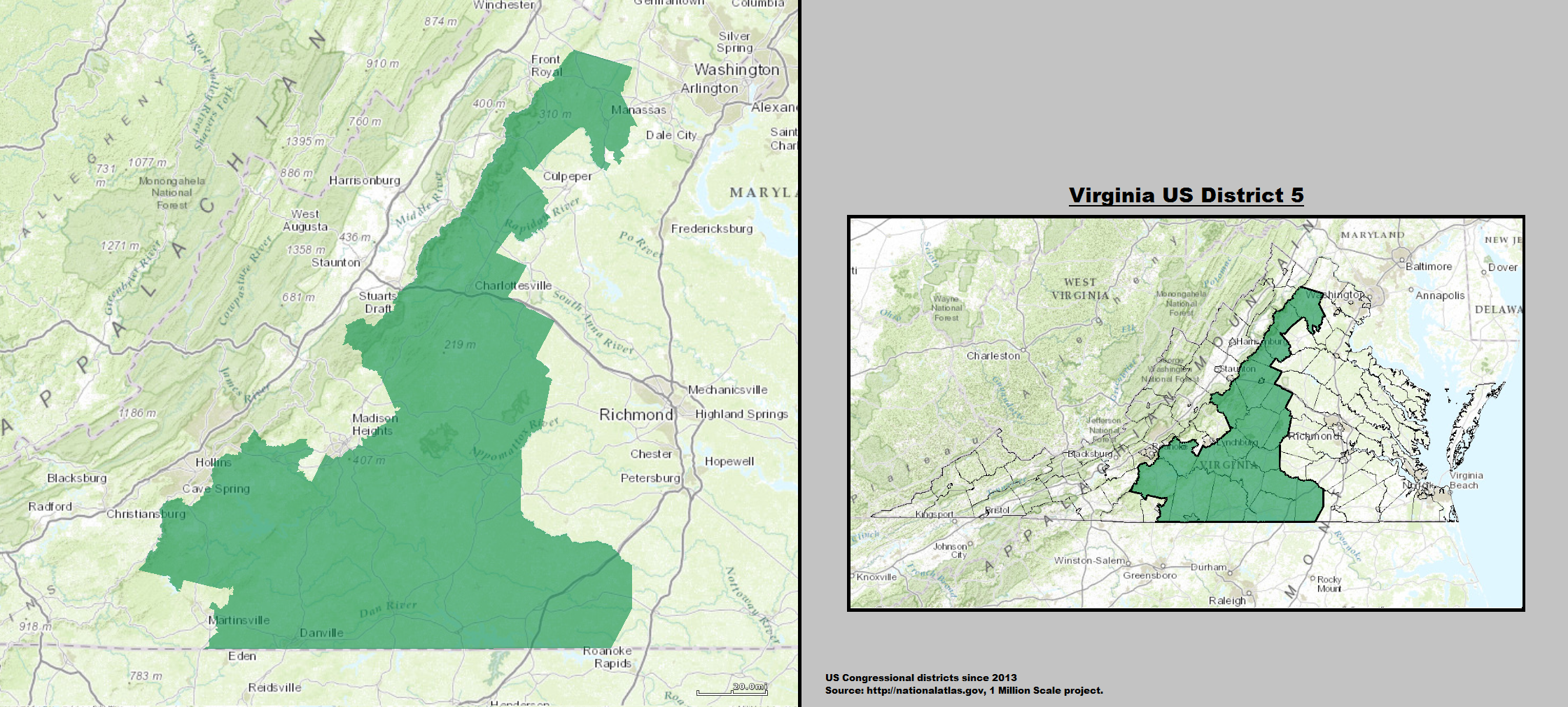
2013–2023

The Virginia Fifth District was originally created in 1788, including the counties of Albemarle, Amherst, Fluvanna, Goochland, Louisa, Spotsylvania, Orange, and Culpepper.

== See also ==
- Virginia's congressional districts
- List of United States congressional districts
