= John Hill (Virginia politician) =

U.S. Representative from Virginia

Member of the U.S. House of Representatives from Virginia's 5th district
- In office March 4, 1839 – March 4, 1841
- Preceded by: James Bouldin
- Succeeded by: Edmund W. Hubard

Personal details
- Born: July 18, 1800 New Canton, Virginia
- Died: April 19, 1880 (aged 79) Buckingham Court House, Virginia
- Party: Whig
- Education: Washington Academy
- Profession: lawyer, judge

John Hill (July 18, 1800 – April 19, 1880) was a U.S. representative from Virginia, cousin of John Thomas Harris.

== Biography ==
Born in New Canton, Virginia, Hill completed preparatory studies and was graduated from Washington Academy (now Washington and Lee University), Lexington, Virginia, in 1818. He studied law and was admitted to the bar in 1821.

Hill was elected as a Whig to the Twenty-sixth Congress (March 4, 1839 – March 3, 1841). He was an unsuccessful candidate for reelection in 1840 to the Twenty-seventh Congress.

Hill then resumed the practice of law. He served as member of the Virginia constitutional convention in 1850–1851. He worked as a Commonwealth attorney for several years, before becoming county judge of Buckingham County from 1870 to 1879.

He died at Buckingham Court House, Virginia, April 19, 1880. He was interred in the Presbyterian Cemetery.

== Electoral history ==
1839; Hill was elected to the U.S. House of Representatives with 54.12% of the vote, defeating Democrat Daniel A. Wilson.

== Sources ==
- United States Congress. "John Hill (id: H000595)". Biographical Directory of the United States Congress.

U.S. House of Representatives
| Preceded by James Bouldin | Member of the U.S. House of Representatives from Virginia's 5th congressional district 1839–1841 | Succeeded by Edmund W. Hubard |
