= 1789 Virginia's 5th congressional district election =

- February 2, 1789
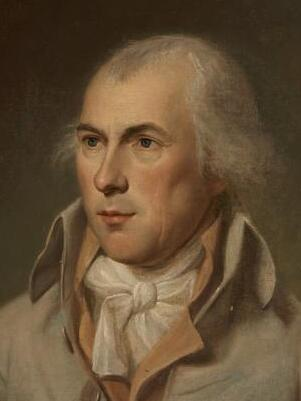

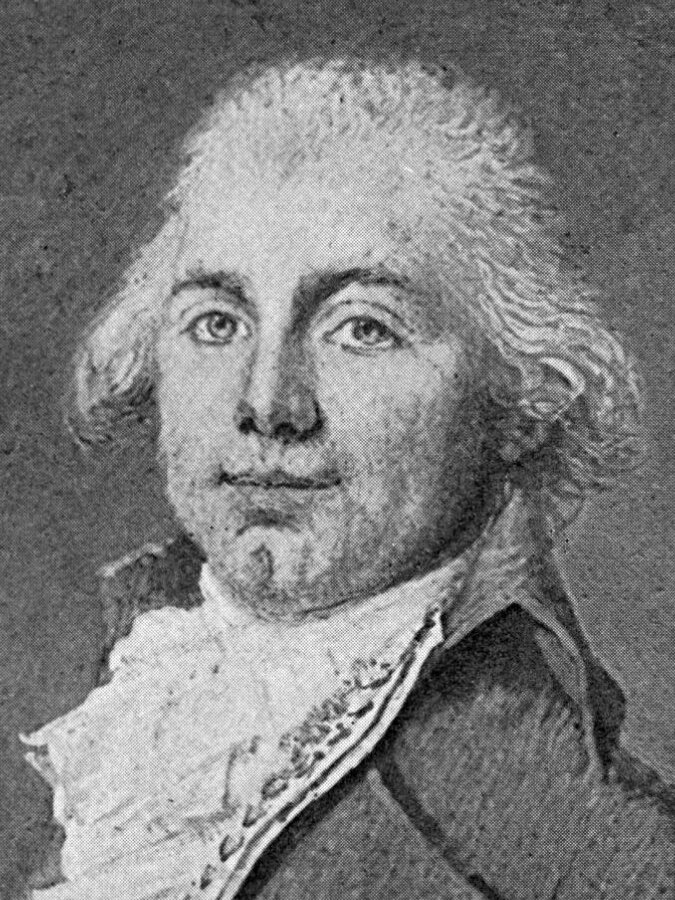
Nominee	James Madison	James Monroe
Party	Federalist	Anti-Federalist
Popular vote	1,308	972
Percentage	57.4%	42.6%
County results
Madison
60–70%
70–80%
90–100%
Monroe
50–60%
60–70%
Elected U.S. Representative
James Madison
Federalist

The first election for Virginia's 5th congressional district took place on February 2, 1789, for a two-year term to commence on March 4 of that year. In a race that turned on the candidates' positions on the need for amendments (the Bill of Rights) to the recently ratified U.S. Constitution, James Madison defeated James Monroe for a place in the House of Representatives of the First Congress. It is the only congressional election in U.S. history in which two future presidents opposed each other.

The race came about when former governor Patrick Henry and other Anti-Federalists in the Virginia General Assembly, who had opposed the state's ratification of the Constitution, sought to defeat Madison, who had been a strong advocate for ratification, and who wanted to become a member of the new House of Representatives; they had already defeated him in the legislative election to choose Virginia's first U.S. senators. They put forward Monroe, a young but experienced politician who was a war hero wounded at the 1776 Battle of Trenton, as a candidate for the seat. Monroe did not seek the contest, but once drafted campaigned vigorously. Despite bitterly cold weather, the two candidates debated outdoors; traveling after one such meeting, Madison suffered frostbite on his face.

Although Madison had earlier stated that amendments to the Constitution were not necessary, during the campaign he took the position that they were, but should be proposed by Congress, rather than by an Article V Convention that Anti-Federalists such as Monroe and Henry supported. Madison won the election comfortably, to the satisfaction of his supporters such as President-elect George Washington. The race did not affect Madison's friendship with Monroe, who was elected to the Senate in 1790, and who would serve as Madison's Secretary of State and succeed him as president in 1817.

== Background ==
James Madison was born on March 16, 1751 (March 5, 1750, Old Style), at the Belle Grove plantation near Port Conway, Virginia. He grew up on his parents' estate of Montpelier, and was involved in politics from a young age, serving on the local Committee of Safety at age 23. He represented Orange County in the Fifth Virginia Convention of 1776. After service on the Virginia Council of State, where he forged a lifelong friendship with Governor Thomas Jefferson, he was elected to the Second Continental Congress becoming its youngest member. In the following years, he became a strong advocate of closer ties between the states, and when in 1784 he returned home and became a member of the Virginia House of Delegates (the lower house of the Virginia General Assembly, the state legislature), he helped defeat a plan by Patrick Henry to impose taxes to support the Christian religion. He was one of Virginia's delegates to the Constitutional Convention in 1787, and helped persuade General George Washington to be its chair, which gave the convention the moral authority to propose a new plan of government. He was the originator of the Virginia Plan that became the basis of the federal government proposed by the convention.

James Monroe was born April 28, 1758, in Westmoreland County, Virginia, the son of prosperous planters, Spence Monroe and Elizabeth Jones Monroe. By 1774, the year he entered the College of William & Mary, both his parents had died. In early 1776, he joined the Virginia militia and became an officer in the Continental Army, later that year being severely wounded at the Battle of Trenton. He left Continental service in 1779, and was made a colonel in the state militia. After the war, Monroe studied law under Jefferson and was elected to the House of Delegates in 1782, and to the Congress of the Confederation in New York in 1783, where he sought to expand the powers of that body.

In 1784, Madison was told by Jefferson that Monroe wanted to begin a correspondence with him, beginning a relationship that would last until Monroe's death in 1831. The two men differed over whether their state should ratify the Constitution at the Virginia Ratifying Convention, with Madison in favor and Monroe against. Opponents deemed the proposed national government to be too powerful, and many wanted a second constitutional convention in order to place limits on it. Despite their efforts, Virginia narrowly ratified the Constitution on June 25, 1788. Monroe, like Jefferson, believed that there needed to be a Bill of Rights protecting fundamental liberties from infringement by the new federal government.

== Selection of candidates ==
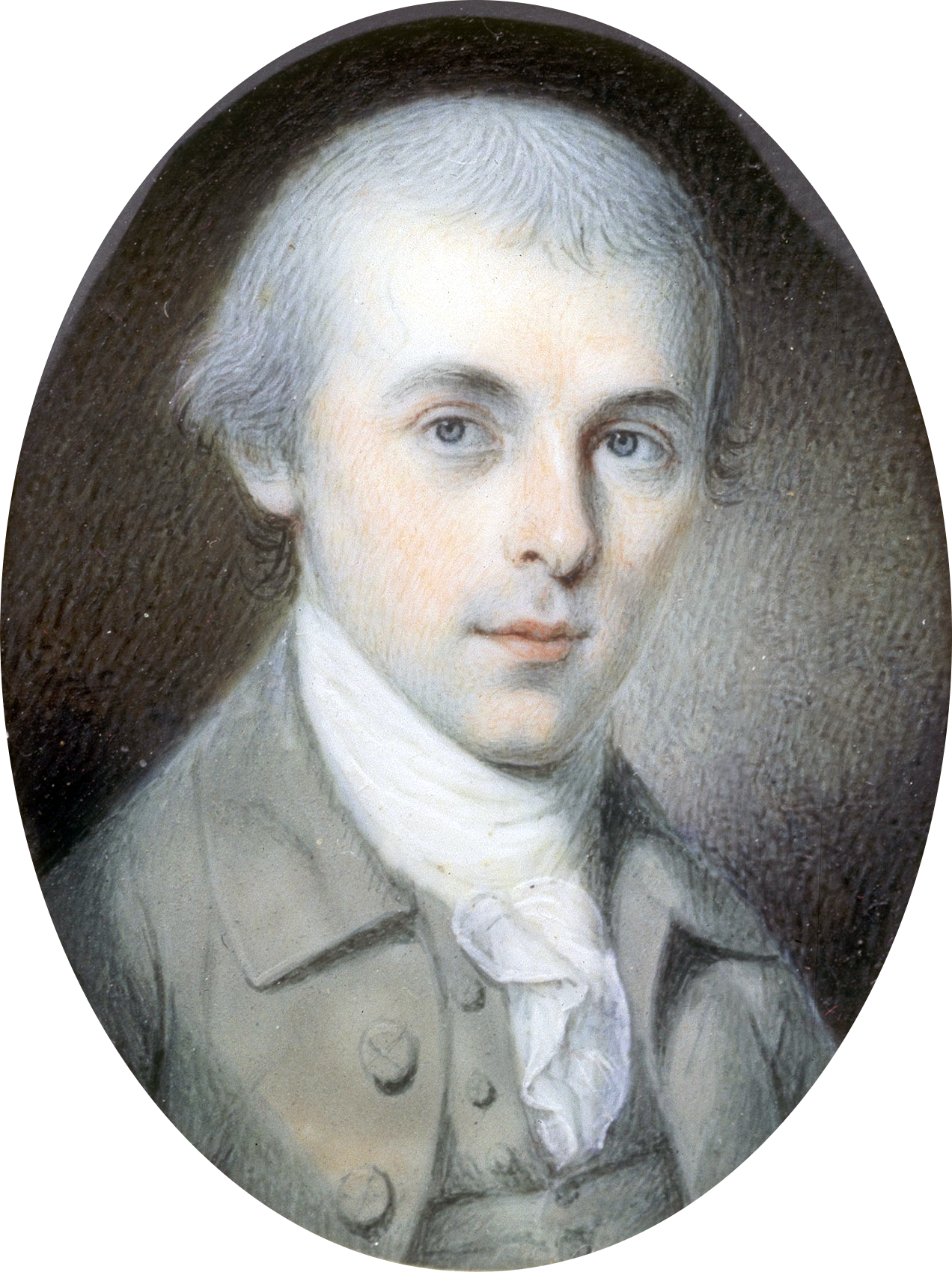
Madison in 1783, by Charles Willson Peale

Ratification had not been a major issue in the Virginia legislative elections of 1788, since it was expected to be decided by the Ratifying Convention that had just been chosen by the voters. When the General Assembly convened in October 1788, though, it had a majority of Anti-Federalist members, and was led by Henry, a member of the House of Delegates for Prince Edward County. Henry sought to avenge the Anti-Federalist defeat at the Ratifying Convention, and also believed Madison would not seek amendments, or would do so in a lukewarm fashion. On October 31, the General Assembly re-elected Madison to his seat in the lame-duck Confederation Congress, a body that would cease to exist with the coming of the new federal government. Henry's motives in allowing this are uncertain, with some historians stating it was to keep Madison in New York, far from the elections for Congress taking place in Virginia. Historian Chris DeRose hypothesizes that Madison's seat there was his if he wanted it, and his acceptance meant that he expected to remain in New York (where the new Congress would convene) and win his seat in Virginia without needing to campaign. The Anti-Federalists were not seeking to prevent the Federal government from coming into existence as some Federalists alleged, for they could have blocked the necessary bills for elections for Congress and for presidential electors, but they were determined to have members of their faction elected to those posts.

Madison, who sought election to the House of Representatives, yielded to Washington and the Federalist minority in the legislature and allowed his name to be put forward in the legislature's election for Virginia's two U.S. senators—until 1913, senators were elected by the state legislatures. Henry nominated two Anti-Federalists, Richard Henry Lee and William Grayson, while Madison was the sole Federalist named. Henry told the General Assembly that Madison was "unworthy of the confidence of the people" and that his election "would terminate in producing rivulets of blood throughout the land". Henry's nominees were elected, Lee with 98 votes and Grayson with 86, while the defeated Madison gained 77.

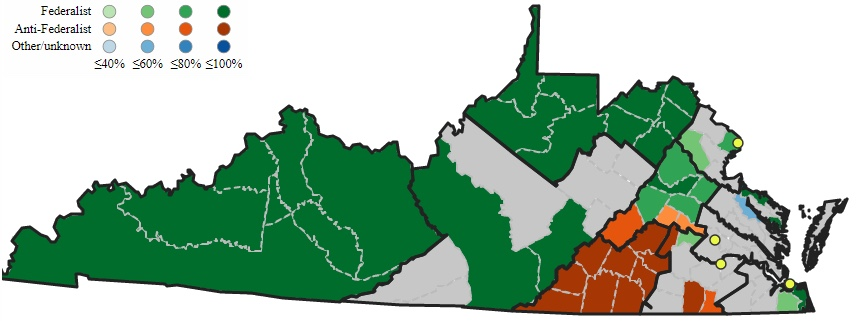
Virginia congressional districts of 1789. The Fifth District is towards the right, immediately above the entirely-brown Sixth District. Virginia then included the present states of Kentucky and West Virginia.

The General Assembly turned its attention to dividing the state into congressional districts. Madison's home county, Orange, was placed in a district with seven others, five of which had elected representatives to the Ratifying Convention who had opposed ratification, while Orange and one other had voted in favor and one county's delegation had split its vote. The General Assembly required that candidates live in the district, a qualification not found in the federal Constitution. Fauquier County, closely associated with Orange both geographically and economically, had supported ratification, but was excluded despite the efforts of Federalists. Despite some stating that Henry had contrived a district in which Madison was sure to be defeated, Thomas Rogers Hunter in a journal article examined the question, and concluded, "the district was compact and bounded on all sides by natural geographic features. Simply put, Patrick Henry did not attempt to gerrymander James Madison out of a seat in the first U.S. Congress." Virginia's 5th congressional district consisted of the counties of Albemarle, Amherst, Culpeper, Fluvanna, Goochland, Louisa, Orange and Spotsylvania. Some of these counties were later divided, so the district that Madison contested also included the present-day counties of Greene, Madison, Nelson and Rappahannock.

French Strother, a long-time Virginia legislator from Culpeper County who had opposed ratification at the Virginia Convention, was solicited as a candidate to oppose Madison, but declined. William Cabell, of Amherst County, was also considered as an Anti-Federalist candidate but Monroe was selected instead. Both Strother and Cabell threw their support behind Monroe. A resident of Spotsylvania County, Monroe was reluctant to run against his friend Madison, but was probably encouraged by Henry, George Mason and other Anti-Federalists, though discouraged by his uncle, Joseph Jones. His service in the Revolutionary War, and his political service after it, were electoral assets. Monroe wrote to Jefferson after the election, "those to whom my conduct in publick life has been acceptable, press'd me to come forward in this Govt. on its commencement; and that I might not lose an opportunity of contributing my feeble efforts, in forwarding an amendment of its defects, nor shrink from the station those who confided in me [would] wish to place me, I yielded." Monroe's reluctance clashed with his ambition and desire for honorable public service, and as his biographer, Tim McGrath, put it, "He truly did not want to run against his friend, but who could refuse Patrick Henry?" David O. Stewart, in his book on Madison's key relationships, takes another perspective: "A simpler explanation is more credible: Monroe disagreed with Madison over whether, how, and how soon the Constitution should be amended, and he thought he just might win the race."

The selection of Monroe was enough to worry Washington: "Sorry indeed should I be if Mr. Madison meets the same fate in the district of which Orange composes a part as he has done in the [General] Assembly and to me it seems not at all improbable." Others were less concerned; Alexander Hamilton of New York wrote to Madison that if he was defeated, "I could console myself ... from a desire to see you in one of the Executive departments". Federalist Henry Lee wrote to him, "I profess myself pleased with your exclusion from the senate & I wish it may so happen in the lower house [in which case] you will be left qualified to take part in the administration, which is the place proper for you". Nevertheless, Henry Lee believed Madison would win, calling Monroe "the beau". Former Confederation congressman Edward Carrington wrote to Madison, assuring him that he need not seek election in another district, "each County [in the Fifth District] will have several active Characters in your behalf," and there was "every reason to think your Election will be tolerably safe at home". Madison disliked electioneering, but realized he would have to campaign hard to win the race. The Fifth District race would be the only congressional election in history to oppose two future U.S. presidents.

== Issues ==
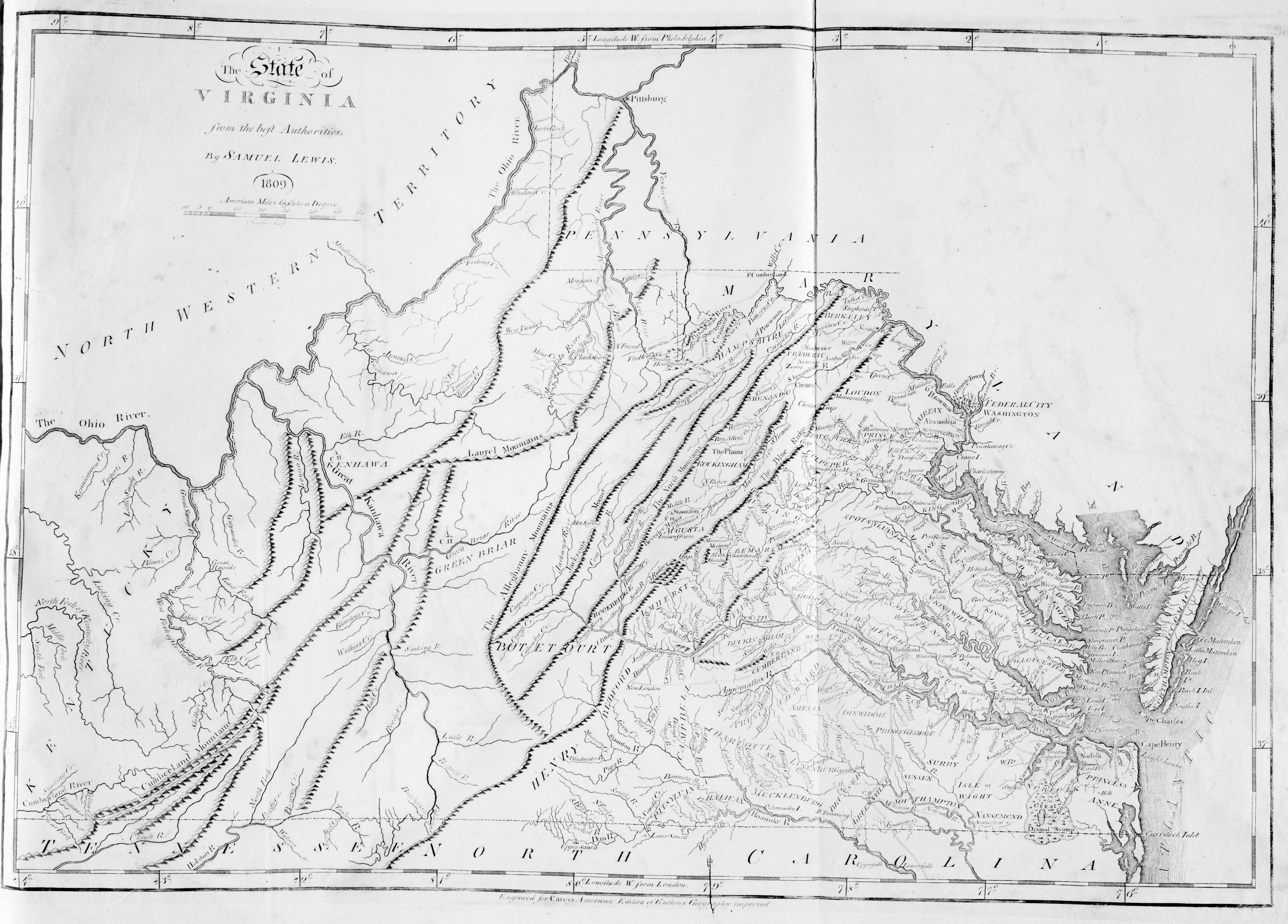
1809 map of Virginia, showing county locations

The largest issue in the campaign was the question of a Bill of Rights protecting personal freedoms as amendments to the Constitution. Madison's view had been that these were unnecessary as the Federal government had only limited power and that in any event, the new government should be allowed to operate for a time before changes were made to the Constitution. To take such a stance in the campaign would be political suicide, and Madison recognized that there was widespread support for such amendments. But he felt it to be important that Congress proposed them, believing that route to be a quicker, easier, and safer means of passage than an Article V convention, which was favored by the Anti-Federalists such as Monroe. Nevertheless, he was skeptical about the effect of such amendments, calling them "parchment barriers", ineffective if the Federal government was determined to bypass them. He told the voters that if elected, he would work diligently for the passage of a Bill of Rights.

Although Monroe was unwilling to indulge in negative campaigning against his friend Madison, supporters of his such as Henry and Cabell did not feel so bound, and a number of pamphlets and letters were published against Madison, alleging that he supported direct taxation of individuals by the Federal government (he had supported including such a power in the Constitution for use in time of war or other need) and that he had pronounced the Constitution perfect and not in need of any change (he had admitted there were imperfections in it, but had not initially supported amending it with a Bill of Rights). Madison's earlier stances made it easy to depict him in this light.

Madison's pledge to support a Bill of Rights if elected left the question of direct taxation as the major difference between them. Monroe believed the power of the Federal government to directly tax the citizens to be not only unnecessary, but injurious to American liberty. He felt the government could raise money by tariffs, by the sale of public lands, or by borrowing. Madison responded that were the Federal government unable to tax citizens directly, tariffs would be the major source of revenue, and this would disproportionately hurt the South, which had few manufactures and imported heavily from overseas. He also stated that having federal taxes paid in each state would help bind the nation together as giving each a financial stake in the Union's success.

== Campaign ==
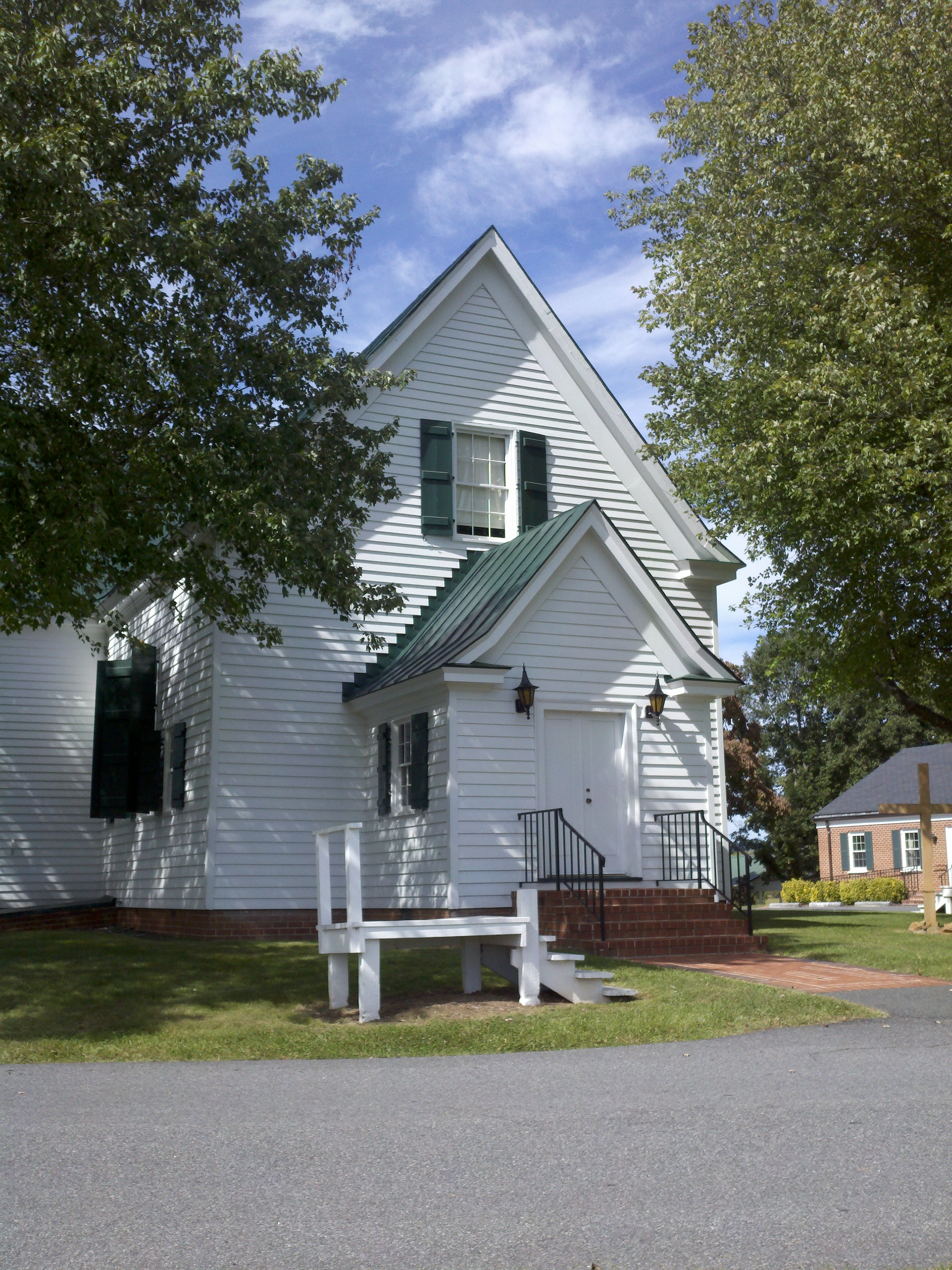
Madison and Monroe debated outside the Hebron Lutheran Church (seen in 2012).

Madison had been in New York, helping to wrap up the affairs of the old Congress of the Confederation. He received letters from other parts of Virginia from those who believed the residency requirement unconstitutional, offering to have him run there, but he preferred to run in his home district, and he declined. A trip to Virginia on horseback or in a carriage would be personally hard on Madison, then suffering from a bad case of hemorrhoids. On December 8, 1788, he wrote to Jefferson (who was in Paris) that he would return to Virginia to campaign for his election, a decision prompted in part by warnings from Virginians that he could not win without personally fighting for the seat. He arrived at Washington's plantation, Mount Vernon, on December 18, for a visit that lasted until he returned home to Orange County and his estate, Montpelier, just after Christmas. From the time Madison arrived in Virginia, the weather was unusually cold and snowy; the candidates often had to speak in freezing conditions, and the last weekend before the election saw 10 inches (250 mm) of snow.

Aware he was not an orator of Henry's quality, Madison launched a letter-writing campaign, advocating for the new Constitution; though initially taken by surprise, Monroe also set out his positions in letters. It was Madison's intent, in writing to key citizens in each community, both to enlist support, and have the recipients circulate the letters locally or publish them in local newspapers. For Monroe's part, according to DeRose, he "poured himself into the campaign with frenetic energy, determined to campaign everywhere, to personally engage voters, and to make liberal use of his pen to correspond with community leaders. From the first days of the race, Monroe wrote letter after letter to voters and mailed them to a county's prominent Anti-Federalists, who would then distribute them personally to the intended recipients." Strother wrote a letter in support of Monroe, calling him "a man who possesses great abilities integrity and a most amiable Character ... Considering him as being able to render his Country Great Services on this important occasion".

On January 7, 1789, Virginians chose electors who would vote for the first U.S. president. The districts for this were not coextensive with congressional districts, since Virginia was entitled to 12 electors but only 10 congressmen. Still, six of the counties in the Fifth District were in the same district for choosing an elector, and the race featured a Federalist and Anti-Federalist, though both were pledged to vote for Washington for president. Goochland and Louisa counties were not in that electoral district, but Buckingham County was. The Federalist, Edward Stevens, was elected, and outpolled his opponent within the Fifth District, but both parties took hope from the result, with the Anti-Federalists cheered by the fact that Stevens had easily taken Spotsylvania County, where the local favorite Monroe would presumably do better.

The candidates sought to appeal to the local religious communities, of which the Baptists were the most influential. That community had taken the position that the Constitution did not provide sufficient protection for their religious liberty. Madison wrote to one of their clergymen, George Eve, on January 2, 1789, stating that "it is my sincere opinion that the Constitution ought to be revised, and that the first Congress meeting under it, ought to prepare and recommend to the states for ratification, the most satisfactory provisions for all essential rights, particularly the rights of conscience [religion] in the fullest latitude, the freedom of the press, trials by jury, security against general warrants, etc." Eve became a powerful advocate for Madison against Monroe surrogates who sought the endorsement of Baptist congregations for their candidate. Madison's pledge of support for amendments defused much of the Anti-Federalist anger against him.

The two men were quite friendly with each other, and decided to travel together between debates, riding from courthouse to courthouse, making speeches before large crowds. These debates showed the physical contrast between the tall, athletic Monroe, who had a full head of brown hair, and the short, slender Madison and his receding hairline. They often rode together, ate together, and lodged in the same room. In 18th century Virginia, Court Day, a different day in each local county, was not only an opportunity for lawyers and judges to try cases, but a social gathering, including fairs, markets, and other events. The candidates addressed those present, sometimes speaking for hours to the largest crowds they were likely to find during the campaign. On January 14, Madison reported to Washington that he had "pursued my pretensions much farther than I had premeditated; having not only made great use of epistolary means [letter writing], but actually visited two Counties, Culpeper & Louisa, and publicly contradicted the erroneous reports propagated agst. me". Henry Lee wrote to Washington three days later, "Mr Madison is gaining ground fast but still he is involved in much doubt & difficulty. Powerful & active supporters appear in every county for him—his presence has done good & will do more."

The debate that DeRose deemed perhaps the most significant of the race took place one evening at the Hebron Lutheran Church in Culpeper (today in Madison County). The Lutherans, like the Baptists, had been persecuted in America, and generally voted as a bloc to maximize their influence. Monroe and Madison attended the worship service, after which there was musical entertainment featuring fiddles. They and the congregation then went outside, and the two candidates debated on the front porch as the congregation stood in the bitter cold, with snow on the ground, likely for hours. Riding away afterwards, likely home to Montpelier, Madison suffered a frostbitten nose. In his old age, former president Madison would tell the story of that night, and point to the left side of his nose, (Note: By other accounts, his left ear. See Hunter, p. 798) saying he had battle scars.

== Election ==
White males who were 21 years of age or older and who owned 50 acres (20 ha) of unimproved land or half that with a house were eligible to vote in the Fifth District. Approximately 5,189 voters formed the district's electorate. Per the 1790 census, there were 11,231 free white males age over 16 in the district, so about half of free white men were able to vote. The total population (including women, slaves and children) of the district was 91,007, so the electorate made up less than 6% of the total population, and perhaps 12–15% of those aged over 21.

There was no secret ballot in Virginia elections in 1789; voters entered the local courthouse and publicly declared their votes, to be recorded by a clerk. The elections were administered by county sheriffs, normally the senior justice of the peace who had not already served in that capacity. Due to the bitterly cold weather in the Fifth District, the sheriffs in some counties extended voting beyond February 2, allowing more voters to reach their county courthouse. This was not authorized by Virginia law, but had also occurred in the voting for presidential electors the previous month.

To get out the vote, Madison's supporters sent wagons around to transport voters to the polls. They brought one very old man from a distance, and he listened to them talk and asked if the Monroe spoken of was the son of Spence Monroe, formerly of Westmoreland County. On being told he was, the man declared he would vote for James Monroe, for "I do not know James Madison", but Spence Monroe had once fed him, clothed him and sheltered him.

Once the polls closed, the local sheriff went to the door of the courthouse and proclaimed the result. It took time for complete results to be compiled; partial returns were printed in newspapers. On February 10, the sheriffs of the eight counties of the Fifth District met at Albemarle's courthouse, as the county first named in the election statute, to certify the results. Their returns indicated that Madison won the election with 1,308 votes to 972 for Monroe.

In Madison's home county of Orange, he received 216 votes to Monroe's 9, in Culpeper 256 to Monroe's 103; he won Albemarle County by 69 votes and Louisa by 104. Madison had given considerable attention to Orange, apparently spending the day of the polls there despite the urgings of some supporters to base himself for the day in a more populous county, and two-thirds of his margin of victory came from Orange. Strong Baptist support for Madison there contributed to the outcome. Madison had been able to hold down the margin in strongly Anti-Federalist Amherst to 246–145 for Monroe, who also took his home county of Spotsylvania by 74 votes, Fluvanna by 21 and Goochland by 1 vote.

The Baptists favored Madison due to his record of support for religious liberty. Washington congratulated Madison on the "respectable majority of the suffrages of the district for which you stood." Monroe stated of Madison, "It would have given me concern to have excluded him."

== Aftermath and assessment ==
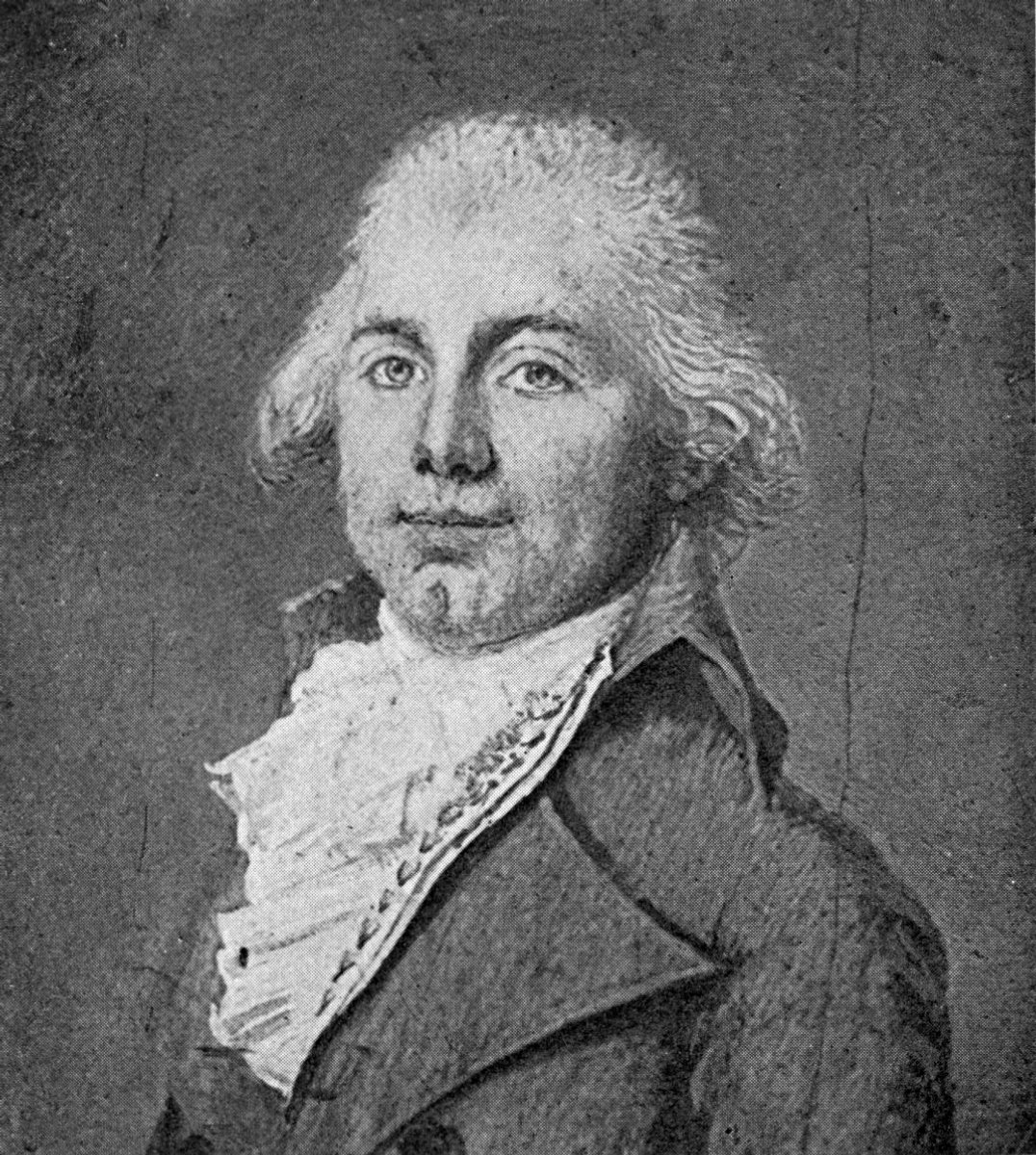
Monroe in 1794

After the election, Madison wrote to Jefferson, "It was my misfortune to be thrown into a contest with our friend, Col. Monroe. The occasion produced considerable efforts among our respective friends. Between ourselves, I have no reason to doubt that the distinction was duly kept in mind between political and personal views, and that it has saved our friendship from the smallest diminution." He wrote in later years, "Perhaps there never was another instance of two men brought so often, and so directly at points [of disagreement], who retained their cordiality towards each other unimpaired through the whole. We used to meet in days of considerable excitement, and address the people on our respective sides; but there never was an atom of ill will between us." Within ten weeks of the election, the two were exchanging friendly letters, and Monroe purchased for Madison four tickets in the Fredericksburg Academy lottery, one of which won. According to Stewart, "Barely thirty years old, Monroe had time to make his way. Losing to the prominent Madison was no disgrace."

In the House of Representatives, Madison introduced and guided to passage the amendments that became known as the Bill of Rights. He broke with Washington over the administration's policies, and allied with Jefferson, helping gain the latter's election to the presidency, and became his Secretary of State in 1801. He succeeded Jefferson as president in 1809. Although defeated for Congress, Monroe's frequent court appearances as a lawyer kept him in the public eye in Virginia. In 1790, after Grayson's death, the General Assembly elected him to the U.S. Senate. He served thereafter in a number of offices, including, twice, Governor of Virginia, and in 1811 Madison named Monroe as Secretary of State. Monroe was elected president in succession to Madison in 1816, taking office the following year.

Early Monroe biographer George Morgan wrote, "There have been hundreds of exciting congressional races, but was there ever another quite as curious as this?" Hunter stated, "Unlike most congressional elections, this one had significant ramifications, for had Monroe been victorious, our ultimate constitutional framework might have been quite different ... had it not been for Madison's tireless efforts, twelve would-be amendments—including what we now know as the Bill of Rights—would probably not have passed the First Congress in September 1789 and been sent to the states for ratification". Harlow Giles Unger, in his biography of Monroe, wrote, "By supporting the most important Antifederalist demand and pledging to sponsor a bill of rights in the First Congress, Madison had extended a hand of compromise to moderate Antifederalists and effectively separated them from Patrick Henry's radicals, who sought to emasculate the new central government."

According to DeRose, "no residents of a U.S. congressional district have ever had a better selection of candidates since the 5th District of Virginia in the election of 1789." He commented, though, that had the Anti-Federalist Monroe been victorious, he would not have been able to persuade the Federalist majority in Congress to pass amendments, as did the Federalist leader Madison, and without such, ultimately the Union would have failed. DeRose wrote, "The high-stakes battle between two Founding Fathers would forever alter the trajectory of the young nation."

== Results ==
1789 Virginia's 5th congressional district election
Party	Candidate	Votes	%
Federalist	James Madison	1,308	57.37
Anti-Federalist	James Monroe	972	42.63
Turnout		2,280	100

=== Results by county ===
County	Madison	Votes	Monroe	Votes
Albemarle	62.37%	174	37.63%	105
Amherst	37.08%	145	62.92%	246
Culpeper	71.31%	256	28.69%	103
Fluvanna	40.00%	42	60.00%	63
Goochland	49.81%	132	50.19%	133
Louisa	64.77%	228	35.23%	124
Orange	96.00%	216	4.00%	9
Spotsylvania	37.83%	115	62.17%	189
Total	57.4%	1308	42.6%	972

== Sources ==
- Ammon, Harry (1990) [1971]. James Monroe: The Quest For National Identity (paperback ed.). University Press of Virginia. ISBN 978-0-8139-1266-0.
- Burstein, Andrew (Spring 1998). "Jefferson's Madison versus Jefferson's Monroe". Presidential Studies Quarterly. 28 (2): 394–408. JSTOR 27551866.
- Bybee, Jay S. (1997). "Ulysses at the Mast: Democracy, Federalism, and the Sirens' Song of the Seventeenth Amendment". Northwestern University Law Review. 91 (1). Northwestern University School of Law.
- DeRose, Chris (2011). Founding Rivals: Madison vs. Monroe, the Bill of Rights and the Election That Saved a Nation. Regnery History. ISBN 978-1-59698-282-6.
- Hunter, Thomas Rogers (Fall 2011). "The first gerrymander? Patrick Henry, James Madison, James Monroe, and Virginia's 1788 congressional districting". Early American Studies. 9 (3): 781–820. doi:10.1353/eam.2011.0023. JSTOR 23546676. S2CID 143700791.
- Ketcham, Ralph (2002). "James Madison". In Graff, Henry F. (ed.). The Presidents: A Reference History (Third ed.). Charles Scribner's Sons. pp. 57–70. ISBN 978-0-684-31226-2.
- Labunski, Richard (2008). James Madison and the Struggle for the Bill of Rights. Oxford University Press. ISBN 978-0-19-534142-3.
- Leibiger, Stuart (1999). Founding Friendship: George Washington, James Madison, and the Creation of the American Republic (eBook ed.). University of Virginia Press. ISBN 978-0-8139-1882-2.
- McGrath, Tim (2020). James Monroe: A Life (eBook ed.). Dutton. ISBN 978-0-698-40889-0.
- Morgan, George (1921). The Life of James Monroe. Small, Maynard and Company. OCLC 3139456.
- Rives, William Cabell (1866). History of the Life and Times of James Madison. Vol. 2. Little, Brown. OCLC 970971673.
- Slaughter, Philip (1877). A History of St. Mark's Parish. Innes & Co. OCLC 11513375.
- Stewart, David O. (2015). Madison's Gift: Five Partnerships that Built America (eBook ed.). Simon & Schuster. ISBN 978-1-4516-8858-0.
- Unger, Harlow Giles (2010) [2009]. The Last Founding Father: James Monroe and a Nation's Call to Greatness (paperback ed.). Da Capo Press. ISBN 978-0-306-81918-6.
