= David Tannenberg =

Organ builder (1728–1804)

- Born: March 21, 1728; Berthelsdorf, Germany
- Died: May 19, 1804 (aged 76); York, Pennsylvania
- Occupation: Organ builder

David Tannenberg (March 21, 1728 – May 19, 1804) was a Moravian organ builder who emigrated to Pennsylvania. He is cited as the most important American organ-builder of his time. He constructed a number of organs during his lifetime, as well as other keyboard instruments. Many of the organs that he built are still in use.

== Biography ==
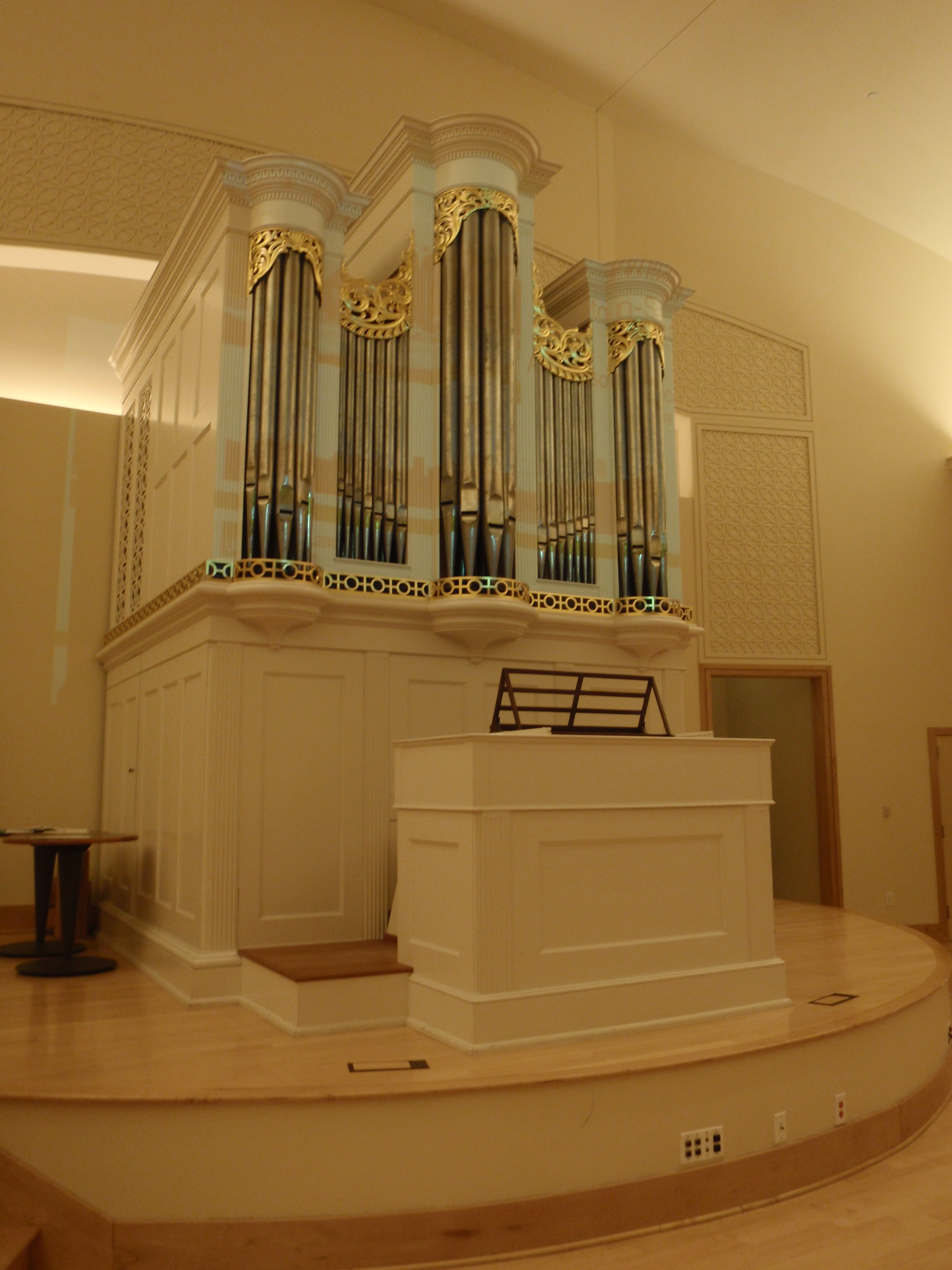
Tannenberg 1800 Home Moravian Church Organ, now located in the Old Salem Visitor Center, Salem, NC

David Tannenberg was born March 21, 1728, in Berthelsdorf, Upper Lusatia. His parents, Johann Tannenberg and Judith Tannenberg, née Nitschmann, had left Moravia as refugees in 1727. Tannenberg attended schools in the Moravian communities of Ronneburg, Marienborn and eventually Herrnhaag.

He received a call to join the Moravian community in Zeist and traveled there in 1748. While in Zeist, Tannenberg began making arrangements to travel with a group of Moravians to Bethlehem, Pennsylvania. He boarded the Moravian ship The Irene and landed in America on May 12, 1749. He arrived in Bethlehem the same year. He married Anna Rosina Kern not long after arriving. Anna Rosina Kern was born on March 2, 1721, in Ebersdorf, Upper Lusatia. According to Moravian church records, the surname Tannenberg was "colloquially, and usually written, Tanneberger." The couple had three daughters, Rosina, Maria Elizabeth, and Anna Maria. They had two sons, David and Samuel.

Tannenberg was a joiner by trade and began to practice that trade in Pennsylvania and played a role in the construction of the homes and buildings of Bethlehem. He designed the steeple of the Moravian Church in Lititz.

In 1778, Tannenberg and twenty-one other members of his congregation took an Oath of Allegiance to the newly formed government of the United States. This caused some controversy, since the church had remained loyal to King George III.

According to music historian Thomas McGeary, "Tannenberg was the most important eighteenth-century American organ-builder."

== Work ==
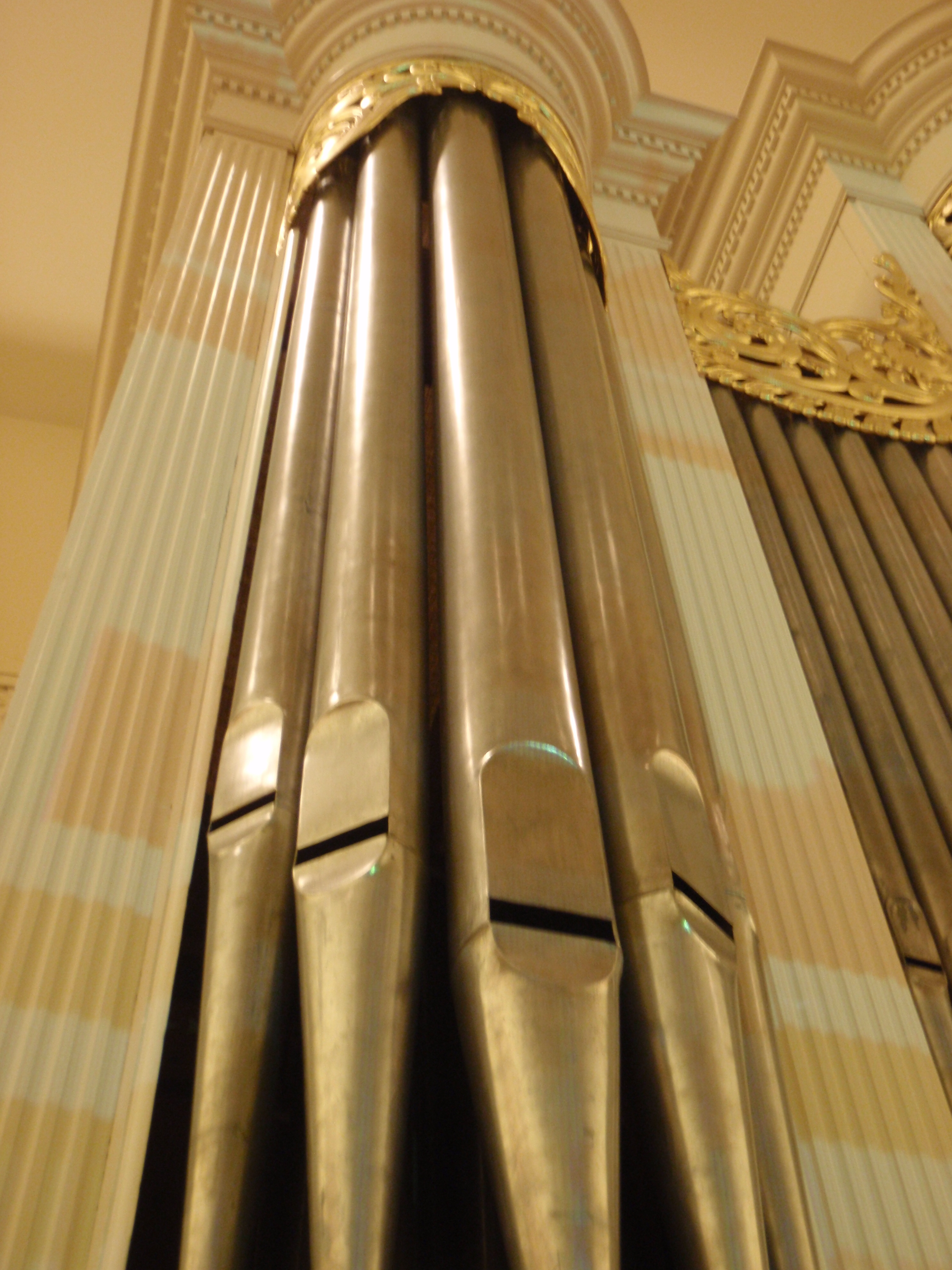
Detail of Home Moravian Church Organ

In late 1757 or early 1758, Tannenberg began learning the craft of organ building from Johann Gottlob Klemm. In 1758, he assisted Klemm in construction of an organ in Nazareth. After Klemm’s death, Tannenberg did not build any organs for three years. Tannenberg moved to Lititz, Pennsylvania, with his family in 1765. There, he purchased the home of one of the settlers of Lititz named George Klein. He worked out of the house until his death. He was active in the collegium musicum of Lititz as an organist and string player of the Moravian congregation there and began building organs for Lutheran, Reformed and Moravian Churches. He was reportedly well regarded in his community. He was a good performer on the violin and a capable tenor singer. He also built pianos, harpsichords, and probably a clavichord. None of those instruments are known to still exist. However, the directions for building a clavichord still survive and offer insights to building techniques of the time.

In 1762, Klemm died, ending Tannenberg's training. He did not build any organs for the next three years. Then, from 1765 until his death in 1804, under Tannenberg's guidance, over forty organs were constructed. These were primarily for churches in Pennsylvania. However, organs were also constructed in Albany, New York, Frederick, Maryland, and Salem, North Carolina. He had an apprentice, Johann Philip Bachmann.

List of known Tannenberg organs	Notes
1765 – Moravian Church, Lancaster, PA	Debuted April 22 with only one stop playing. The cost was £50, as based on this, the organ was probably had 3 or 4 stops organ.
1765 or 1768 – Moravian Church, York, PA	3 stops and possibly a pull-down pedal
1766 – Philadelphia, PA	According to The Philadelphia Moravian, this was built for "a man here in the city."
1767 – Albany, New York	This may have been built for the first church in Albany to have an organ. It is known that Tannenberg had traveled to Albany around that time.
1768 – A Church in Lynn Township, PA.	It is uncertain which church commissioned this organ.
1769 – New Goshenhoppen German Reformed Church, East Greenville, PA	In 1869 this organ was replaced by an organ by Edwin Krauss.
1770 – German Reformed Church, Lancaster, PA	
1770 – German Reformed Church, Frederick, Maryland	This represents work done on a preexisting organ.
1770 – Zion Lutheran Church, Moselem Springs, PA	
1771 – Trinity Lutheran Church, Reading, PA	
1771 – St. Michael's Lutheran Church, Philadelphia	This was a rebuild using parts from an organ previously constructed by Johann Adam Schmahl. Later, the instrument was replaced with another, also using salvaged parts.
1772 – No information as to the place for which this organ was constructed	Records of the time report a large turnout for the debut.
1773 – Moravian Church, Lebanon, PA	Based on cost records, this organ likely had 4 stops. It debuted on November 14 and was destroyed by on July 29, 1858.
1774 – Holy Trinity Lutheran Church, Lancaster, PA	
1775 – St. Mary's Roman Catholic Chapel, Lancaster, PA	This organ was later some to another church. It was later stripped of its pain. The case remains in existence.
1775 – Lutheran Church, Frederick, Maryland	This was a probably a large organ, which may have been replaced in 1825 by an instrument built by Adam Ault. It may have been sold in 1855 to a church in Ohio.
1776 – Union Church (German Reformed & Lutheran), Easton, PA	
1776 – Moravian Chapel, Bethlehem, PA	
1777 – Single Brothers' House, Lititz, PA	This organ debuted on August 30 and probably had 4 stops.
1780 – Residence of John Fischer, York, PA	This was built for a Lutheran clock-maker and artist. After Fisher's death in 1808, the fate of the organ is unknown.
	The organ debuted on November 8. The church departed the town in 1808. The fate of the organ is unclear.
1783 – Hagerstown, Maryland	This was probably built for either a German Reformed Church, or one of two Lutheran Churches. It was most likely built for St John's Lutheran, which had been built in 1770, and lists an organ from 1782 in its records.
1784 – German Reformed Church, York, PA	In July 1797, the church and organ were lost in a fire.
1786 – Union Church (German Reformed & Lutheran), Egypt, PA	This organ probably had 6 stops. A new organ, built by Charles Heintzelman, replaced it in 1869.
1787 – Moravian Congregation, Lititz, PA	
1790 – Zion Lutheran Church, Philadelphia, PA	
1791 – Zion Lutheran Church, Spring City, PA	
1793 – Moravian Chapel, Graceham, Maryland	
1793 – Moravian Congregation, Nazareth, PA	
Ca. 1795 – German Reformed Church, Philadelphia, PA	This organ was replaced in 1836 with and instrument constructed by Henry Knauff.
1795 – St. John's Union Church (German Reformed & Lutheran), Kutztown, PA	The exact location where this organ was built is uncertain.
1795 – St. John's Reformed Church, Wernersville (Lower Heidelberg Township), PA	
1796 – Zion Lutheran Church, Baltimore, Maryland	Based on the organ's cost, it was probably mid-sized. It was destroyed in a fire on March 30, 1840.
1797 – Zion Lutheran Church, Lehigh (Lower Macungie), PA	This two manual and pedal organ was repaired or rebuilt in 1844.
Prior to 1798 – Union Church (German Reformed & Lutheran), Tohickon (Bedminster Township)	The organ was rebuilt by Andrew Krauss in 1839.
1798 – Gemeinhaus Saal (Moravian Chapel), Salem, North Carolina	
1798 – Single Sister's House, Lititz, PA	Probably a four stop instrument.
1799 – Moravian Church, Lancaster, PA	Dedicated on January 20.
1799 – St. John's Lutheran, Center Square, PA	
1800 – Home Moravian Church, Salem, North Carolina	Restored in 2004 at a cost of $600,000 and housed in the Old Salem Visitor Center.
1801 – St. Stephen's German Reformed Church, New Holland, PA	
1802 – Hebron Lutheran Church, Madison, Virginia	
1804 – Christ Lutheran Church, York, PA	

At the time of its opening on October 10, 1790, the organ Tannenberg constructed at the Zion Church in Philadelphia was the largest in the United States and considered the best of its kind. The construction was 24 ft (7.3 m) feet across in the front, by feet deep, by 27 ft (8.2 m) high. The front row of metal pipes numbered 100. There were 2000 pipes in the body. The organ had five sets of keys. There was a fire in the church on December 26, 1794, which destroyed the building. The organ was destroyed, except for a few salvaged pipes. Tannenberg later wrote to a friend that, "On the main manual seven stops are now in place, and the pedal are complete, with the exception of five pipes in the Trombone Bass. The Echo is in place and completed. On the upper manual one stop, the Principal, is finished. When all is drawn out on the lower manual, with Pedal, the church is well filled with the volume of sound."

In May 1797, the committee of the Moravian Church in Philadelphia sold the church organ, as it had fallen into a state of decay. The church paid Tannenberg a sum of eleven shillings and sixpence in November 1797 for tuning of the organ they had commissioned from Peter Kurtz during the interim. Tannenberg's organs at that time were praised for the tones in the diapasons and in the upper registries, including the 12th, 15th, and sesquialtera.

== Legacy ==
Extant organs of David Tannenberg
Year	Location
1770	Zion Lutheran Church, Moselem Springs, PA
1776	Moravian Chapel, Bethlehem, PA
1787	Moravian Congregation, Lititz, PA
1791	Zion Lutheran Church, Spring City, PA
1793	Moravian Chapel, Graceham, Maryland, moved in 1957 to (and currently extant at) Moravian Congregation Chapel, Lititz, PA
1798	Gemeinhaus Saal, Salem, North Carolina
1800	Home Moravian Church, Salem, North Carolina; Restored in 2004 and housed in the Old Salem Visitor Center.
1802	Hebron Lutheran Church, Madison, Virginia
1804	Christ Lutheran Church, York, PA; now in the York County History Center

== Later years and death ==
Tannenberg was tuning an organ he had constructed at the Lutheran Church in York, PA when he suffered an episode of apoplexy. He fell from the bench, struck his head, and was injured. He subsequently died on May 19, 1804. The last organ which he had constructed during his lifetime was played for the first time at his funeral. Children from Lutheran and Moravian congregations sang at graveside services.
