= Thomas Bouldin =

American politician

Thomas T. Building

Member of the U.S. House of Representatives from Virginia's 5th district
- In office August 26, 1833 – February 11, 1834
- Preceded by: John Randolph
- Succeeded by: James Bouldin
- In office March 4, 1829 – March 4, 1833
- Preceded by: John Randolph
- Succeeded by: John Randolph

Personal details
- Born: Thomas Tyler Bouldin; 1781 Charlotte Court House, Virginia
- Died: February 11, 1834 (aged 52–53) Washington, D.C.
- Resting place: "Golden Hills," Drakes Branch, Virginia
- Party: Jacksonian Party
- Profession: Planter, lawyer, judge

Thomas Tyler Bouldin (1781 – February 11, 1834) was an American lawyer and politician who served as a U.S. representative from Virginia, serving non-consecutive terms between 1829 and 1834.

He was the brother of James Wood Bouldin, who succeeded him in Congress following his death.

== Biography ==
Born near Charlotte Court House, Virginia, Thomas Bouldin attended the country schools, then studied law.

=== Early career ===
He was admitted to the bar, December 6, 1802, and began to practice at Charlotte Court House, Virginia. He was appointed judge of the circuit court.

He supported himself and his family through his plantation, "Golden Hills," near Drakes Branch, Virginia, where he held 30 slaves at the time of his death.

=== Congress ===
Bouldin was elected as a Jacksonian to the Twenty-first and Twenty-second Congresses (March 4, 1829 – March 3, 1833). He was an unsuccessful candidate for reelection to the Twenty-third Congress.

Bouldin was subsequently elected to the Twenty-third Congress to fill the vacancy caused by the death of John Randolph. He served from August 26, 1833, until his sudden death in Washington, D.C.

=== Death and burial ===
He died on February 11, 1834, while addressing the House of Representatives. He was delivering a eulogy for his predecessor, John Randolph. His final words were recorded as being: "But I cannot tell the reasons why his death was not announced, without telling what I told a friend I should say, in case..."

He was interred in a private cemetery on his slave plantation. He was succeeded in Congress by his brother James Bouldin.

== Elections ==
- 1829; Bouldin was re-elected to the U.S. House of Representatives with 46.09% of the vote, defeating Independents George William Crump and a man identified only as Miller.
- 1831; Bouldin was re-elected with 58.62% of the vote, defeating Independent Crump.

== See also ==
- List of members of the United States Congress who died in office (1790–1899)

== Sources ==
- United States Congress. "Thomas Bouldin (id: B000663)". Biographical Directory of the United States Congress.

U.S. House of Representatives
Preceded by John Randolph	Member of the U.S. House of Representatives from Virginia's 5th congressional district 1829–1833	Succeeded by John Randolph
Preceded by John Randolph	Member of the U.S. House of Representatives from Virginia's 5th congressional district 1833–1834	Succeeded by James Bouldin
