= Johann Philip Bachmann =

Organ builder (1762–1837)

Johann Philip Bachmann (1762–1837) was an organ builder. He was born in Creuzburg, Thuringia, Germany. Bachmann left home at the age of 16 to work for a master carpenter where he learned about the moravians and eventually moved to Herrnhut germany to commit himself to the creation of musical instruments. He emigrated to the moravian settlement Lititz, Pennsylvania in 1793 and worked with David Tannenberg. In 1793, he married Tannenberg’s youngest daughter Anna Maria, who committed suicide in 1799.

Bachmann’s organ-building career began when Tannenberg, concerned that he lacked an apprentice, asked (and received) permission from the Moravian elders to obtain one from Herrnhut, another Moravian community. Bachmann transported an organ from Tannenberg's shop in Lititz, Pennsylvania to Salem, North Carolina where he installed it at the newly built Home Moravian Church. The organ has been restored by Taylor & Boody, and now resides at Old Salem Visitor Center in Winston-Salem, North Carolina. In 1800, a disagreement occurred between master and apprentice, although Bachmann did install the 1802 Tannenberg organ in Hebron Evangelical Lutheran Church, Madison, Virginia. However, Bachmann did wind up starting his own business — but Tannenberg supplies the pipes of his first organ (built in 1803). In 1837, he became a piano and cabinet builder.

Bachmann suffered from rheumatism for nearly 20 years after his split from Tannenberg. This eventually took his life on November 15, 1837 after several months of being a complete invalid.
