= William Milnes Jr. =

American politician

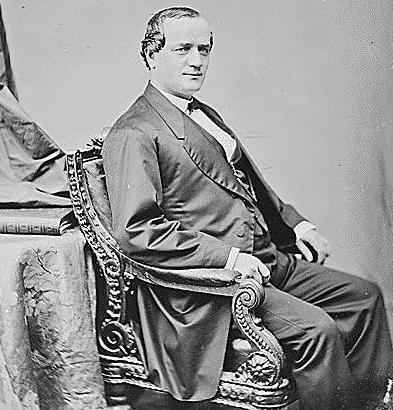

Member of the U.S. House of Representatives from Virginia's 6th district
- In office January 27, 1870 – March 3, 1871
- Preceded by: Shelton Leake (1861)
- Succeeded by: John T. Harris

Member of the Virginia House of Delegates
- In office 1870-1871

Personal details
- Born: December 8, 1827 Yorkshire, England, United Kingdom
- Died: August 14, 1889 (aged 61) Shenandoah, Virginia
- Party: Conservative
- Profession: Politician, Industrialist

William Milnes Jr. (December 8, 1827 – August 14, 1889) was a nineteenth-century congressman and industrialist from Virginia and Pennsylvania.

== Formative years ==
Born in Yorkshire, England on December 8, 1827, Milnes immigrated to the United States with his family in 1829, settling in Pottsville, Pennsylvania. He attended public schools as a child, and went on to learn a machinery trade.

== Career ==
Milnes engaged in mining and coal shipping before moving to Shenandoah, Virginia in 1865. While there, he engaged in the iron business.

A member of the Virginia House of Delegates in 1870 and 1871, Milnes was subsequently elected as a Conservative to the United States House of Representatives in 1869, serving from 1870 to 1871.

Afterwards, he resumed work in the iron business, and continued in that industry until his death.

=== Election of 1869 ===
Milnes ran unopposed and was elected to the U.S. House of Representatives in 1869.

== Death and interment ==
Milnes died in Shenandoah, Virginia on August 14, 1889. He was interred in the family plot in the Methodist Church Cemetery in Shenandoah.

U.S. House of Representatives
Preceded by Shelton Leake^{(1)}	Member of the U.S. House of Representatives from Virginia's 6th congressional district January 27, 1870 – March 3, 1871	Succeeded by John T. Harris
Notes and references
1. Because of Virginia's secession, the House seat was vacant for almost nine years before Milnes succeeded Leake.
