= Paulus Powell =

American politician

Member of the Virginia House of Delegates from Amherst County
- In office 1843–1847
- Preceded by: James Powell
- Succeeded by: William Dillard
- In office 1863–1865 Serving with Henry E. Smith

Member of the U.S. House of Representatives from Virginia
- In office March 4, 1849 – March 3, 1859
- Preceded by: William L. Goggin (5th); John Caskie (6th)
- Succeeded by: Thomas S. Bocock (5th); Shelton Leake (6th)
- Constituency: 5th district (1849-53); 6th district (1853-59)

Personal details
- Born: 1809 Amherst County, Virginia
- Died: June 10, 1874 (aged 64–65) Amherst, Virginia
- Resting place: "Kenmore," Amherst, Virginia
- Party: Democratic
- Profession: Planter, lawyer, judge

Paulus Powell (1809 – June 10, 1874) was a nineteenth-century politician from Virginia who served five terms in the U.S. House of Representatives from 1849 to 1859.

== Biography ==
Born in Amherst County, Virginia, Powell attended private schools as a child and went on to attend Amherst College.

=== Elected official ===
He held several local offices and was a member of the Virginia House of Delegates from 1843 to 1849. He was elected a Democrat to the United States House of Representatives in 1848, serving from 1849 to 1859. After being unsuccessful for reelection in 1858, he returned to the House of Delegates in 1863 and 1864.

=== Death and burial ===
Powell died in Amherst, Virginia, on June 10, 1874, and was interred in the family cemetery on his brother-in-law's estate called "Kenmore" near Amherst.

== Electoral history ==
- 1849; Powell was elected to the U.S. House of Representatives with 50.87% of the vote, defeating Whig William Leftwich Goggin.
- 1851; Powell was re-elected with 51.46% of the vote, defeating Whig Goggin.
- 1853; Powell was re-elected with 52.49% of the vote, defeating Whig Alexander Mosely.
- 1855; Powell was re-elected with 56.68% of the vote, defeating an American identified only as Ligon.
- 1857; Powell was re-elected unopposed.
- 1859; Powell lost his bid for re-election.

U.S. House of Representatives
Preceded by William L. Goggin	Member of the U.S. House of Representatives from Virginia's 5th congressional district March 4, 1849 – March 3, 1853	Succeeded by Thomas S. Bocock
Preceded by John Caskie	Member of the U.S. House of Representatives from Virginia's 6th congressional district March 4, 1853 – March 3, 1859	Succeeded by Shelton Leake
