= James Bouldin =

American politician

James Wood Bouldin

Member of the U.S. House of Representatives from Virginia's 5th district
- In office March 15, 1834 – March 4, 1839
- Preceded by: Thomas Bouldin
- Succeeded by: John Hill

Chairman of the Committee on the District of Columbia
- In office March 4, 1837 – March 4, 1839
- Preceded by: William B. Shepard
- Succeeded by: William C. Johnson

Member of the Virginia House of Delegates from Charlotte County
- In office 1825; Alongside Richard J. Gaines

Personal details
- Born: 1792 Charlotte County, Virginia
- Died: March 30, 1854 (aged 61–62) "Forest Hill," Charlotte County, Virginia
- Party: Democratic-Republican
- Other political affiliations: Jacksonian
- Profession: Planter, lawyer

James Wood Bouldin (1792 – March 30, 1854) was an American U.S. Representative from Virginia, and brother of Thomas Tyler Bouldin.

== Biography ==
Born in Charlotte County, Virginia, Bouldin attended the common schools, then studied law. He was admitted to the bar April 12, 1813, and began to practice at Charlotte Court House, Virginia. He served as member of state house of delegates from 1825 to 1826.

Bouldin was elected as a Jacksonian to the Twenty-third Congress to fill the vacancy caused by the death of his brother Thomas Bouldin. He was reelected to the Twenty-fourth Congress, then as a Democrat to the Twenty-fifth Congress. He served in Congress from March 15, 1834, to March 3, 1839. He served as chairman of the Committee on District of Columbia (Twenty-fifth Congress), and opposed the abolition of slavery in the District of Columbia on the grounds that slaves were "freer, happier, and more intelligent, and more pious" than they would have been as free people in Africa.

Following his departure from Congress, possibly due to alcoholism, he resumed the practice of law and also engaged in agricultural pursuits. He died at his country home, "Forest Hill," Charlotte County, Virginia, March 30, 1854. He was interred in the private burial ground on his estate.

== Elections ==
- 1835; Bouldin was re-elected with 58.98% of the vote, defeating Whig Philip A. Bolling.
- 1837; Bouldin was re-elected unopposed.

== Sources ==
- United States Congress. "James Bouldin (id: B000662)". Biographical Directory of the United States Congress.

U.S. House of Representatives
Preceded by Thomas Bouldin	Member of the U.S. House of Representatives from Virginia's 5th congressional district 1834–1839	Succeeded by John Hill
