= Woodside (Buckingham, Virginia) =

Historic house in Virginia, United States

- U.S. National Register of Historic Places
- Virginia Landmarks Register
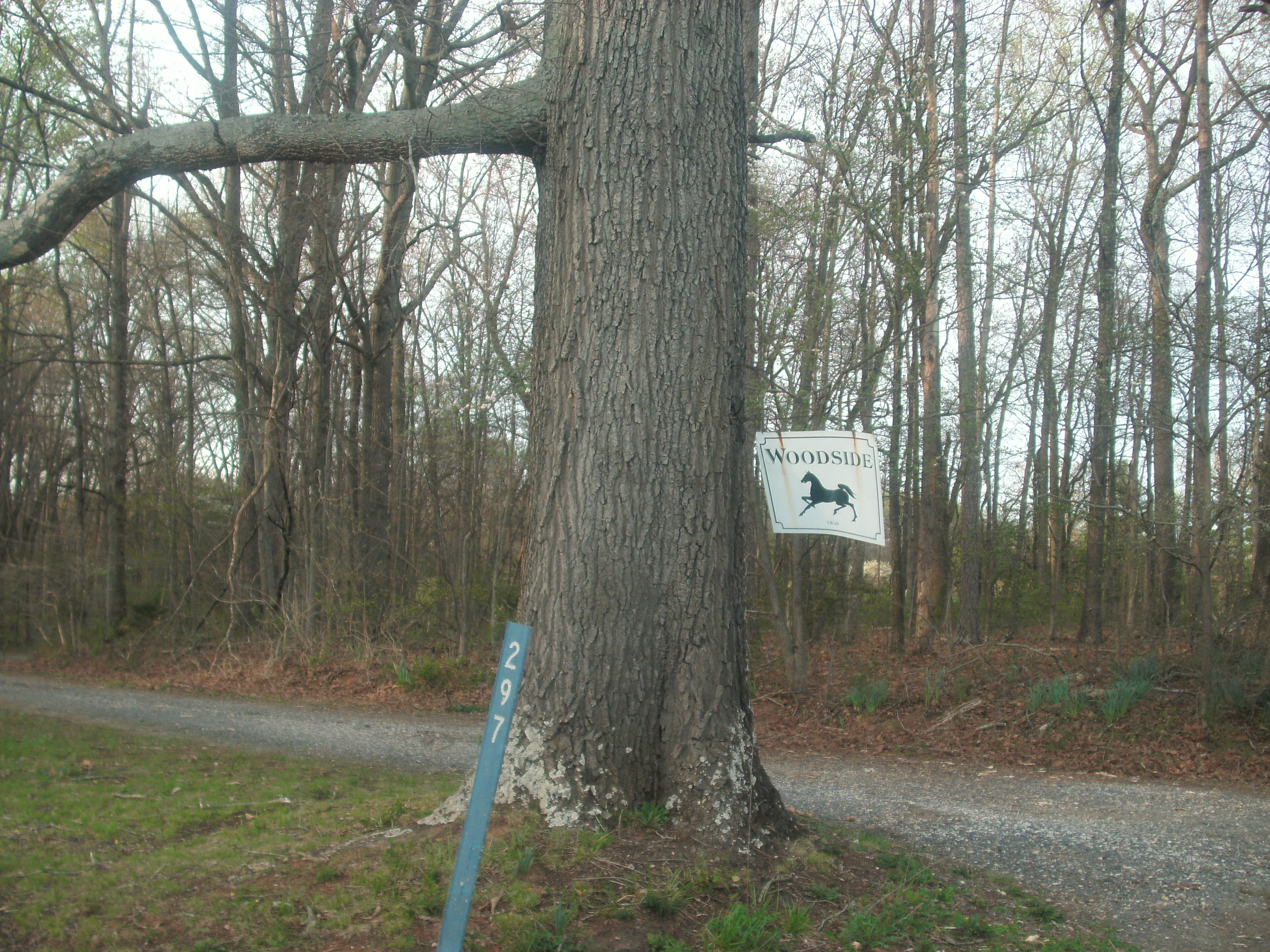
- Sign at the entrance to the property, April 2017

- Location within Virginia Location within the United States
- Location: VA 631 N side, 0.5 mi. SW of jct. with US 60, Buckingham, Virginia
- Coordinates: 37°32′56″N 78°32′59″W
- Area: 62.1 acres (25.1 ha)
- Built: c. 1860; 166 years ago
- Architectural style: Greek Revival
- NRHP reference No.: 93000040
- VLR No.: 014-0041

Significant dates
- Added to NRHP: November 16, 1993
- Designated VLR: December 9, 1992

Woodside is a historic plantation house located at Buckingham, Buckingham County, Virginia. The main house was built about 1860, and is a two-story, five-bay, T-shaped frame dwelling in the Greek Revival style. It consists of a projecting three-bay, pedimented pavilion with flanking one-bay, hip-roofed wings. It has a hipped roof and is sheathed in weatherboard siding. In 1937 a kitchen wing was added to the rear elevation of the dwelling. Also on the property are a contributing smokehouse (c. 1860), a covered well and the sites of an icehouse, kitchen, dairy, and corncrib.

It was listed on the National Register of Historic Places in 1993.
