= Inglewood, Mecklenburg County, Virginia =

Unincorporated community in Virginia, US

Coordinates: 36.628°N 78.414°W

Inglewood is an unincorporated community in Mecklenburg County, Virginia, United States.

The Goode plantation, named Inglewood, was the birthplace of the 19th-century politician William Goode in 1828. He served in the Virginia state legislature and was elected as a member of the U.S. House of Representatives (1841–1843) and (1853–1859), when he died.

== See also ==
- Inglewood, Rockingham County, Virginia
