= 1859 Virginia gubernatorial election =

- May 26, 1859
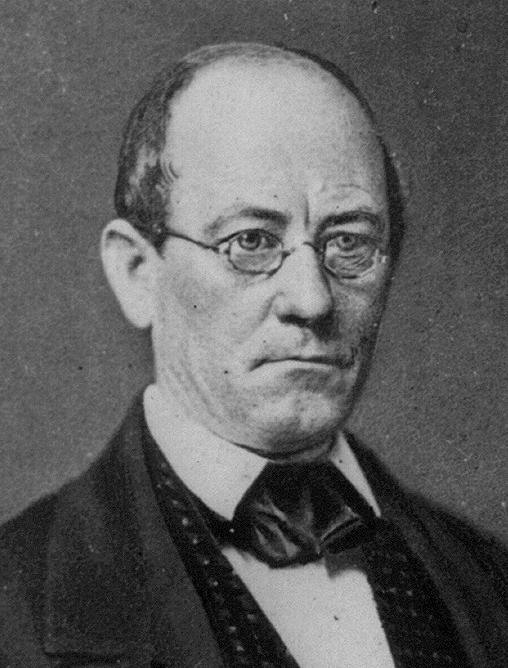

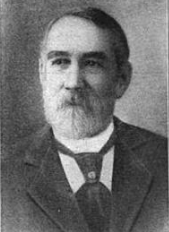
| Nominee | John Letcher | William L. Goggin |
| Party | Democratic | Opposition |
| Popular vote | 77,216 | 71,592 |
| Percentage | 51.89% | 48.11% |
- County results Letcher: 50–60% 60–70% 70–80% 80–90% 90–100% Goggin: 50–60% 60–70% 70–80% No Data/Vote
Governor before election
Henry A. Wise
Democratic
Elected Governor
John Letcher
Democratic

The 1859 Virginia gubernatorial election was held on May 26, 1859, to elect the governor of Virginia.

== Campaign ==
In February 1859, Archibald Campbell and John Curtiss Underwood proposed a coalition between the Republican Party of Virginia and Whig Party. However, the Whigs refused to change their position on slavery. The Republicans did not run a gubernatorial candidate and the party told its members to abstain from the election.

== Results ==
Virginia gubernatorial election, 1859
| Party | Candidate | Votes | % |
|---|---|---|---|
| Democratic | John Letcher | 77,216 | 51.89% |
| Opposition | William L. Goggin | 71,592 | 48.11% |
| Total votes | | 148,808 | 100.00% |
| Democratic hold | | | |

== Works cited ==
- Lowe, Richard (1973). "The Republican Party in Antebellum Virginia, 1856-1860". The Virginia Magazine of History and Biography. 81 (3). Virginia Historical Society: 259–79. doi:10.2307/4247810. JSTOR 4247810.
