= Shelton Leake =

American politician

Member of the U.S. House of Representatives from Virginia
- In office March 4, 1845 – March 4, 1847
- Preceded by: William L. Goggin
- Succeeded by: William L. Goggin
- Constituency: 5th district
- In office March 4, 1859 – March 3, 1861
- Preceded by: Paulus Powell
- Succeeded by: William Milnes, Jr. (1870)
- Constituency: 6th district

1st Lieutenant Governor of Virginia
- In office January 16, 1852 – January 1, 1856
- Governor: Joseph Johnson
- Preceded by: Position established
- Succeeded by: Elisha W. McComas

Member of the Virginia House of Delegates from Albemarle County
- In office 1842; Alongside: Thomas Jefferson Randolph

Personal details
- Born: Shelton Farrar Leake; November 30, 1812 Albemarle County, Virginia
- Died: March 4, 1884 (aged 71) Charlottesville, Virginia
- Resting place: Maplewood Cemetery, Charlottesville, Virginia
- Party: Democratic (before 1858)
- Other political affiliations: Independent Democrat (after 1858)
- Spouse: Rebecca Gray
- Children: Gay Pendleton Leake; Ada Shelton Leake; Hiliah Frances Leake; Shelton Farrar Leake
- Profession: lawyer

Shelton Farrar Leake (November 30, 1812 – March 4, 1884) was a 19th-century American politician, lawyer and teacher from Virginia. He served as Virginia's first lieutenant governor from 1852 to 1856. He also served two non-consecutive terms in the United States House of Representatives.

== Biography ==
Born near Hillsboro, Albemarle County, Virginia to Dr. Samuel Leake and Sophia Farrar, Leake completed preparatory studies, taught school, studied law and was admitted to the bar in 1835, commencing practice in Charlottesville, Virginia.

He was a member of the Virginia House of Delegates in 1842 and 1843.

=== Congress ===
He was elected a Democrat to the United States House of Representatives in 1844, serving from 1845 to 1847. Leake was a presidential elector in 1849. Afterward, Leake resumed practicing law and in 1851 was elected the first Lieutenant Governor of Virginia, serving from 1852 to 1856. He was elected back to the House of Representatives as an Independent Democrat in 1858, serving again from 1859 to 1861.

=== Later career and death ===
Leake again resumed practicing law until his death in Charlottesville, Virginia on March 4, 1884. He was interred in Charlottesville in Maplewood Cemetery.

== Electoral history ==
- 1845; Leake was elected to the U.S. House of Representatives with 52.55% of the vote, defeating an Independent identified only as Irving.
- 1859; Leake was re-elected with 59.17% of the vote, defeating Democrat Paulus Powell.

U.S. House of Representatives
| Preceded by William L. Goggin | Member of the U.S. House of Representatives from Virginia's 5th congressional district 1845–1847 | Succeeded by William L. Goggin |
| Preceded by Paulus Powell | Member of the U.S. House of Representatives from Virginia's 6th congressional district 1859–1861 | Succeeded by William Milnes, Jr.^{(1)} |
Political offices
| Preceded by Position established | Lieutenant Governor of Virginia; 1852–1856 | Succeeded by Elisha W. McComas |
Notes and references
1. Because of Virginia's secession, the House seat was vacant for almost nine years before Milnes succeeded Leake.
