= Edmund W. Hubard =

American politician

Edmund Wilcox Hubard

Member of the U.S. House of Representatives from Virginia
- In office March 4, 1841 – March 3, 1847
- Preceded by: John Hill (5th); William Goode (4th)
- Succeeded by: Thomas W. Gilmer (5th); Thomas S. Bocock (4th)
- Constituency: 5th district (1841-43); 4th district (1843-47)

Personal details
- Born: February 20, 1806 Farmville, Virginia
- Died: December 9, 1878 (aged 72) Farmville, Virginia
- Resting place: Farmville, Virginia
- Party: Democratic
- Education: University of Virginia
- Occupation: planter

Military service
- Allegiance: Confederate States of America
- Branch/service: Virginia state militia
- Years of service: 1864
- Rank: colonel
- Battles/wars: American Civil War

Edmund Wilcox Hubard (February 20, 1806 – December 9, 1878) was a nineteenth-century American politician, appraiser and justice of the peace from Virginia.

== Early life and education ==
Born near Farmville, Virginia, Hubard attended private schools as a child and went on to attend the University of Virginia in Charlottesville.

== Career ==
He engaged in agricultural pursuits and was a justice of the peace before being elected as a Democrat to the United States House of Representatives in 1840, serving from 1841 to 1847. He represented the district of Lynchburg. Hubard was not a candidate for re-election in 1846 and instead resumed engagements in agricultural pursuits.

During the Civil War, he was a colonel of a militia regiment in 1864 and was an appraiser of the Confederate States Government to regulate the value of the Confederate dollar.

== Electoral history ==
=== 1841 ===
Hubard was elected to the U.S. House of Representatives with 50.42% of the vote, defeating Whig John T. Hill.

=== 1843 ===
Hubard was re-elected with 51.51% of the vote, defeating Whig Richard H. Toler.

=== 1845 ===
Hubard won re-election with 49.93% of the vote, defeating Whig John J. Hill.

== Death ==
Hubard died of pneumonia at his home near Farmville, Virginia, then part of Buckhingham County, on December 9, 1878, and was interred in the family cemetery near the home.

U.S. House of Representatives
Preceded by John Hill	Member of the U.S. House of Representatives from Virginia's 5th congressional district 1841–1843	Succeeded by Thomas W. Gilmer
Preceded by William Goode	Member of the U.S. House of Representatives from Virginia's 4th congressional district 1843–1847	Succeeded by Thomas S. Bocock
