= William Goode (politician) =

American politician & lawyer (1798–1859)

William Osborne Goode
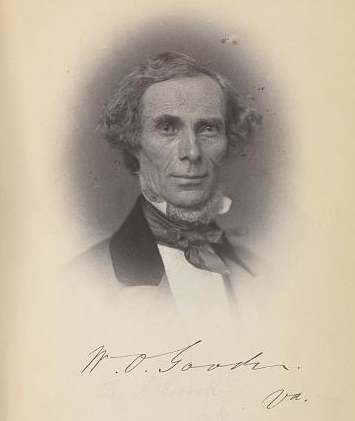
- Portrait of Goode (1859)

Member of the Virginia House of Delegates from Mecklenburg County
- In office 1852 – 1853
- Preceded by: William Baskerville; Edwin Williams
- Succeeded by: John O. Knox
- In office 1845 – 1846; Alongside Mark Alexander, Edwin Williams
- In office 1838 – 1840; Alongside Alexander Dortch, William Baskerville, Francis Boyd
- In office 1824 – 1832; Alongside Nathaniel Alexander, George Tarry, Samuel Lockett, Alexander Knox
- In office 1822; Alongside George Rogers

21st Speaker of the Virginia House of Delegates
- In office 1845 – December 31, 1846
- Preceded by: Valentine W. Southall
- Succeeded by: John Winston Jones

Member of the U.S. House of Representatives from Virginia's 4th district
- In office March 4, 1853 – July 3, 1859
- Preceded by: Thomas S. Bocock
- Succeeded by: Roger Atkinson Pryor
- In office March 4, 1841 – March 3, 1843
- Preceded by: George Dromgoole
- Succeeded by: Edmund W. Hubard

Chairman of the Committee on the District of Columbia
- In office March 4, 1857 – March 3, 1858
- Preceded by: Orlando Ficklin
- Succeeded by: Edward Dodd

Personal details
- Born: September 16, 1798 Inglewood, Mecklenburg County, Virginia, US
- Died: July 3, 1859 (aged 60) Boydton, Virginia, US
- Party: Democratic
- Other political affiliations: Whig (1838)
- Occupation: lawyer

William Osborne Goode (September 16, 1798 – July 3, 1859) was an American politician, slave owner, and lawyer from Virginia.

== Early life and education ==
Goode was born to plantation owner and horse racing enthusiast John Chesterfield Goode (d. 1837) and his wife Lucy Claiborne Goode at their plantation "Inglewood", near the Roanoke River in Mecklenburg County, Virginia. John Goode inherited 13 slaves which were in his estate inventory. William later established a plantation of his own, "Wheatland", about five miles northeast of Boydton. Their noted relative "Race Horse John" Goode predeceased John C. Goode. William Goode graduated from the College of William and Mary in 1819.

== Early legal and planter careers ==
Admitted to the Virginia bar in 1821, William Goode set up a legal practice in Boydton, the Mecklenburg county seat.

Goode farmed at Wheatland using enslaved labor. In the 1830 federal census, his household included ten enslaved Blacks. Two decades later, in the first federal census with detailed slave schedules and the last before his death, Goode owned 41 enslaved people in Mecklenburg county, ranging from 70 and 50 year old Black women, to 15 children 10 years old or younger.

== Political career ==
Mecklenburg County voters elected Goode as one of their representatives in the Virginia House of Delegates for the 1822 to 1823 term. He was re-elected in 1824 and afterward, expecting to serve through the term ending 1833. Goode gave up his seat to make an unsuccessful 1832 run for the United States House of Representatives. During that time, he was also a member of the Virginia Constitutional Convention of 1829. That convention debated increasing representation for western Virginians, as well as codified slavery in the state constitution. As a legislator, Goode had opposed making manumission of slaves easier, as advocated by Thomas Jefferson Randolph.

Goode was re-elected to the House of Delegates (1839–41). He was elected as a Democrat to the United States House of Representatives in 1841, and served from 1841 to 1843. He was elected again to the Virginia House from 1845 to 1847 and was elected as Speaker. He served as delegate to the second Virginia Constitutional Convention in 1850.

Elected again to the US House of Representatives in 1852, Goode served three terms, from 1853 until his death in 1859. He became chairman of the Committee on the District of Columbia from 1857 to 1858.

== Personal life ==
He married twice. In 1820, while in law school, Goode married Sarah Bolling Tazewell of Williamsburg, Virginia. She died on July 9, 1825, aged 22, after her second childbirth, although that son, Tazewell Goode, would die as an infant, as had his brother William O. Goode Jr. In 1829, William Goode married the widow Sarah Maria Waller Massie (1812-1844), who had already born children and bore several more children who lived to adulthood during this marriage, although she also died shortly after childbirth, and that daughter Sarah Massie Goode (1844-1847) died as a child. Three of their sons became Confederate States Army officers after their father's death and Virginia's secession, of whom William Osborne Goode Jr. (1830-1865) died in battle. John Thomas Goode (1835-1916) (who had attended the Virginia Military Institute but resigned before graduation to accept a lieutenant's commission in the U.S. Army, which he relinquished) rose to the rank of Major in the Confederate States Army. Their son Edward Branch Goode (1839-1920) would also become a Confederate officer (in the 34th Virginia Infantry) and survive the war. J. Thomas Goode would marry four times, and his son (this man's grandson), Morton G. Goode would follow the family's traditional careers in law and politics to become president pro tem of the Virginia senate.

== Death and legacy ==
Goode died in Boydton on July 3, 1859. He was buried at his nearby plantation of "Wheatland", which did not survive into the 20th century, although his birthplace "Inglewood" did, and now is the name of an unincorporated community.

=== Electoral history ===
- 1841; Goode was elected to the U.S. House of Representatives with 75% of the vote, defeating Independents Richard H. Baptist and a man identified only as Marshall.
- 1853; Goode was re-elected to the U.S. House of Representatives with 65.34% of the vote, defeating Whig Wyatt Cardwell and Independents William C. Flournoy and William S. Scott.
- 1855; Goode was re-elected with 61.27% of the vote, defeating American Littleton Tazewell.
- 1857; Goode was re-elected with 75.97% of the vote, defeating an American identified only as Collier.
- 1859; Goode was re-elected with 63.79% of the vote, defeating Independent Democrat Flournoy.

== Legacy and honors ==
- A cenotaph was erected in his memory at Congressional Cemetery in Washington, D.C.

== See also ==
- List of members of the United States Congress who died in office (1790–1899)

== Notes ==
U.S. House of Representatives
Preceded by George Dromgoole	Member of the U.S. House of Representatives from Virginia's 4th congressional district 1841–1843	Succeeded by Edmund W. Hubard
Preceded by Thomas S. Bocock	Member of the U.S. House of Representatives from Virginia's 4th congressional district 1853–1859	Succeeded by Roger A. Pryor
Political offices
Preceded by Valentine W. Southall	Speaker of the Virginia House of Delegates; 1845–1846	Succeeded by John W. Jones
