= William L. Goggin =

American politician

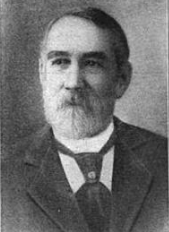

Member of the U.S. House of Representatives from Virginia's 5th district
- In office March 4, 1847 – March 3, 1849
- Preceded by: Shelton Leake
- Succeeded by: Paulus Powell
- In office May 10, 1844 – March 3, 1845
- Preceded by: Thomas Walker Gilmer
- Succeeded by: Shelton Leake

Member of the U.S. House of Representatives from Virginia's 7th district
- In office March 4, 1839 – March 3, 1843
- Preceded by: Archibald Stuart
- Succeeded by: Henry A. Wise

Member of the Virginia House of Delegates from Bedford County
- In office 1836-1837
- Preceded by: Edmund Pate
- Succeeded by: Thomas P. Mitchell

Personal details
- Born: William Leftwich Goggin; May 31, 1807 Bunker Hill, Virginia
- Died: January 3, 1870 (aged 62) Liberty, Virginia
- Resting place: Goggin Cemetery, Bunker Hill, West Virginia
- Party: Whig
- Spouse(s): Mary C. Goggin; Elizabeth C. Goddin
- Education: Winchester Law School
- Profession: lawyer, politician

Military service
- Allegiance: Confederate States of America
- Branch/service: Confederate Home Guard
- Rank: Captain
- Battles/wars: American Civil War

William Leftwich Goggin (May 31, 1807 – January 3, 1870) was a nineteenth-century Whig politician and lawyer from Virginia. He served four terms in the U.S. House of Representatives during three separate stints in Congress between 1839 and 1849.

== Early and family life ==
Born near Bunker Hill in southern Bedford County, Virginia, to Mary Otey Leftwich (1789-1854) and her husband, Pleasant Moorman Goggin (1777-1831), Goggin was descended from prominent families in the area, though only one sister (the future Sarah Steptoe) lived long enough to marry. His younger brother Stephen died in 1844 and his sisters Julia and Lucinda barely survived their father. He received a private education suitable to his class, including at the Pisgah Meeting House, then attended the Winchester Law School in Frederick County, Virginia. In May 1830, Goggin married Mary Cook (1813-1835), though their daughter Sarah survived her mother. In November, 1840 Goggin remarried in nearby Franklin County, to Elizabeth Cook, who survived him. Although several of their children died as infants, Betty (1845-1868), William L. Goggin Jr. (1848-1861) and Samuel Cook Goggin (1850-1928) reached adulthood. The last followed his father's path into law and politics, including a term in the Virginia Senate and also served as clerk of the Bedford County court until his death.

== Career ==
After admission to the Virginia bar in 1828, Goggin moved to Liberty, Virginia, the county seat of Bedford County, Virginia, and began his legal practice. He also farmed using enslaved labor. Liberty was incorporated in 1839, with James F. Johnson, William M. Burwell, John Goode Jr., and Goggin as its leading orators and politicians (and would be renamed "Bedford" after the Civil War). In the 1850 federal census, Goggin characterized himself as a "farmer" and owned 18 enslaved persons.

=== Slaveowner ===
He owned 30 enslaved persons in 1860.

=== Virginia delegate ===
Bedford County voters elected Goggin as one of their representatives (part-time) in the Virginia House of Delegates in 1835, and he served one term from 1836 to 1837, but declined to seek re-election.

=== Congress ===
In 1838 Goggin won election as a Whig to the United States House of Representatives representing Virginia's 5th congressional district (then consisting of Bedford, Amherst, Nelson, Albemarle, Greene, Orange and Madison Counties), and also won re-election in 1841 and 1843 serving from 1839 to 1843, the latter after he unsuccessfully contested the election of Thomas W. Gilmer, but eventually won the off-year election when Gilmer resigned early, so Goggin served again from 1844 to 1845. He later returned for a third time and served from 1847 to 1849, during which time he became chairman of the Committee on Post Office and Post Roads.

He also was selected one of the Board of Visitors of the U.S. Military Academy at West Point by President Millard Fillmore.

=== Campaign for governor ===
In 1859, Goggin ran for Governor of Virginia as the Whig candidate, but lost to Democrat John Letcher. Bedford County voters elected Goggin as a Unionist, as well as Democrat John Goode Jr. to represent them at the Virginia Secession Convention in 1861, but after Lincoln's inaugural address, Goggin advocated for secession.

Goggin's son and namesake enlisted in the 11th Virginia Infantry as a lieutenant on May 15, 1861, as the Civil War began, but fell ill by July and died in September 1861. During the war Goggin became captain of Home Guards for the Confederate Army.

=== Later career and death ===
Afterward, he received a pardon from President Johnson on September 16, 1865, and continued practicing law until his death on January 3, 1870, near Liberty, Virginia. He was interred in his family's burying ground, Goggin Cemetery, near Bunker Hill, West Virginia.

== Electoral history ==
- 1839; Goggin was elected to the U.S. House of Representatives with 52.64% of the vote, defeating Democrat Archibald Stuart, Jr.
- 1841; Goggin was re-elected with 56.54% of the vote, defeating Democrat Stuart.
- 1843; Goggin lost his re-election bid when he was not renominated.
- 1844; Goggin was re-elected with 50.75% of the vote, defeating Democrat William Fitzhugh Gordon.
- 1845; Goggin lost his re-election bid when he was not renominated.
- 1847; Goggin was re-elected with 50.93% of the vote, defeating Democrat Shelton Farrar Leake.
- 1849; Goggin lost his bid for re-election.

Party political offices
First	Opposition nominee for Governor of Virginia; 1859	Succeeded by None
U.S. House of Representatives
Preceded by Archibald Stuart	Member of the U.S. House of Representatives from Virginia's 7th congressional district 1839–1843	Succeeded by Henry A. Wise
Preceded by Thomas W. Gilmer	Member of the U.S. House of Representatives from Virginia's 5th congressional district 1844–1845	Succeeded by Shelton Leake
Preceded by Shelton Leake	Member of the U.S. House of Representatives from Virginia's 5th congressional district 1847–1849	Succeeded by Paulus Powell
