= Hebron Lutheran Church =

Historic church in Virginia, United States

- U.S. National Register of Historic Places
- Virginia Landmarks Register
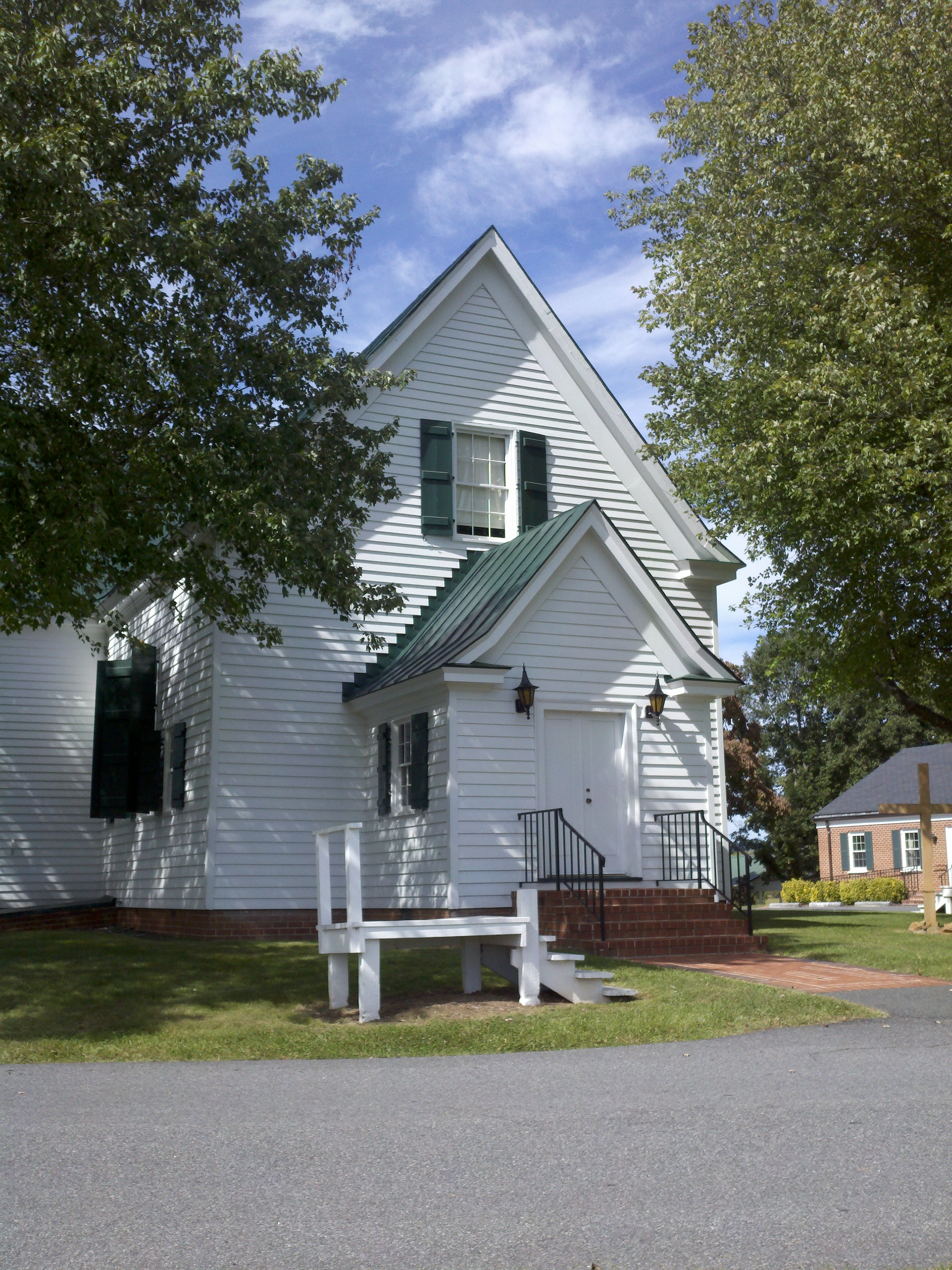
- Hebron Lutheran Church, September 2012

- Location within Virginia Location within the United States
- Location: 1 mi. NE of Madison off U.S. 29, Madison, Virginia
- Coordinates: 38°24′26″N 78°14′51″W
- Area: 9 acres (3.6 ha)
- Built: c. 1740
- Architectural style: Colonial
- NRHP reference No.: 71000986
- VLR No.: 056-0006

Significant dates
- Added to NRHP: July 2, 1971
- Designated VLR: March 2, 1971

Hebron Lutheran Church is a historic Lutheran church located in the countryside northeast of Madison, Madison County, Virginia. The original section was built about 1740, with the south wing added about 1800. It is a one-story, T-shaped, frame building on a stone foundation. The original section measures 50 feet by 26 feet. The building was renovated in 1850 and, in 1885, the flat ceilings were adorned with decorative frescoes of rich Victorian patterns by Giuseppe Oddenino. The building was renovated again in 1961.

It was listed on the National Register of Historic Places in 1971.

In 1802, a new pipe organ made by David Tannenberg, perhaps America's most renowned early builder of pipe organs, was installed in the Hebron Lutheran Church. As the largest remaining and virtually unaltered example of Tannenberg's or any other extant organs from the colonial period, it is of special importance in American organbuilding history. It, like the church wherein it is located, are special examples of American history.

== Pastors ==
The following pastors have served Hebron Lutheran Church.

- John Caspar Stoever 1733-1739
- George Samuel Klug 1739-1764
- Johannes Schwarbach 1765-1775
- Jacob Frank 1775-1778

• Micheal Meyerhoeffer September 1, 1815, to 1821.
