= Buckingham Courthouse Historic District =

Historic place in Buckingham, Virginia

- U.S. National Register of Historic Places
- U.S. Historic district
- Virginia Landmarks Register
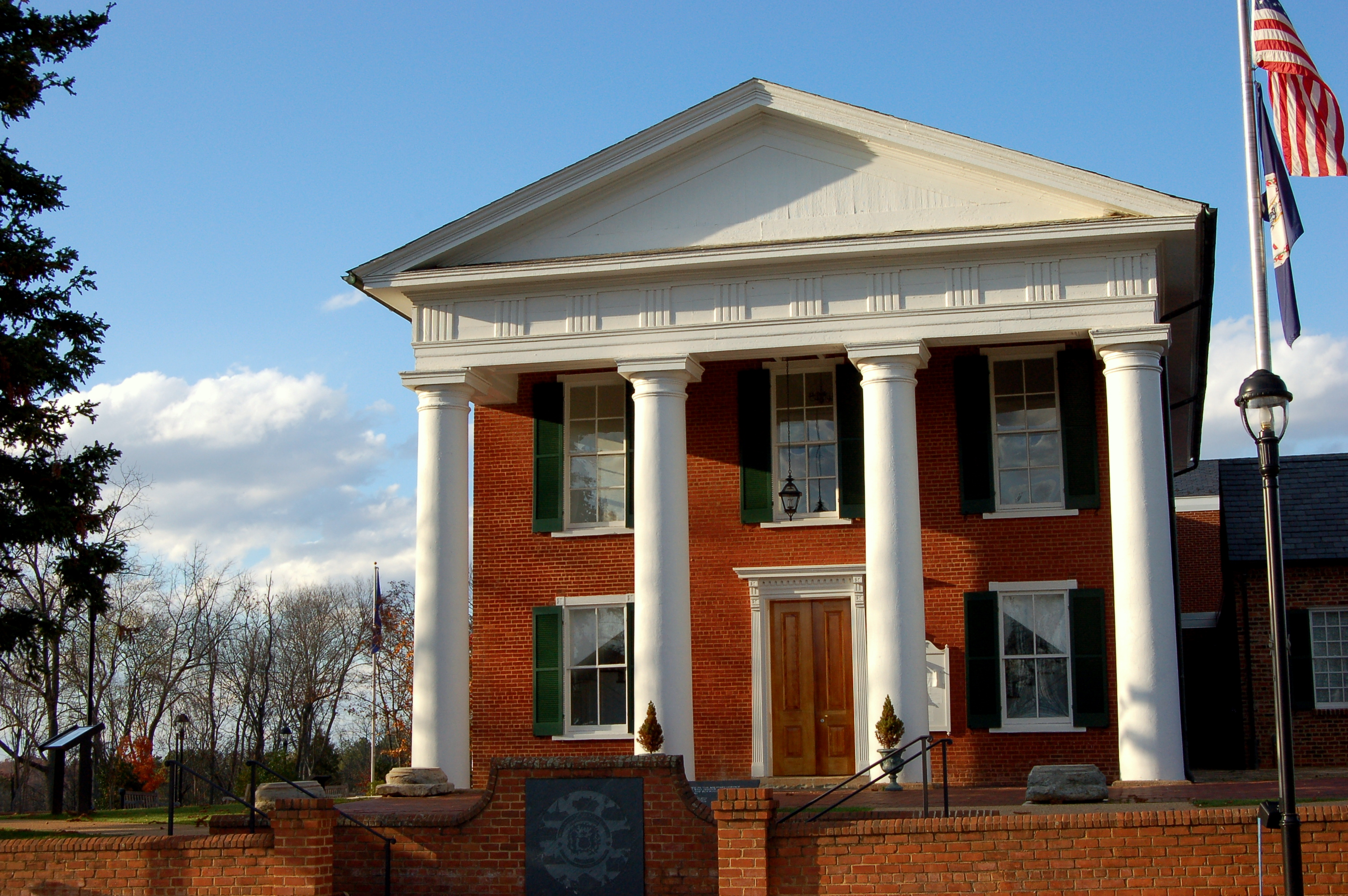
- Buckingham County Courthouse, November 2008

- Location within Virginia Location within the United States
- Location: Both sides of U.S. 60, Buckingham, Virginia
- Coordinates: 37°33′02″N 78°33′22″W
- Area: 0 acres (0 ha)
- Architectural style: Roman Revival
- NRHP reference No.: 69000225
- VLR No.: 014-0111

Significant dates
- Added to NRHP: November 12, 1969
- Designated VLR: September 9, 1969

Buckingham Courthouse Historic District is a historic county courthouse complex and national historic district located at Buckingham, Buckingham County, Virginia. It encompasses 10 contributing buildings and 1 contributing object. The courthouse building was built in 1873, and is a two-story temple-form Greek Revival style building fronted by a pedimented tetrastyle Doric order portico. It replaced an earlier courthouse designed by Thomas Jefferson and built between 1822 and 1824, but burned down in 1869. Also included in the district is the former Buckingham Tavern, former Buckingham Inn, the Leach House, the Presbyterian manse, the Masonic Hall, a brick house called West View, the Trinity Presbyterian Church (c. 1830), and Confederate monument.

It was listed on the National Register of Historic Places in 1969.
