= Buckingham, Virginia =

- Census-designated place
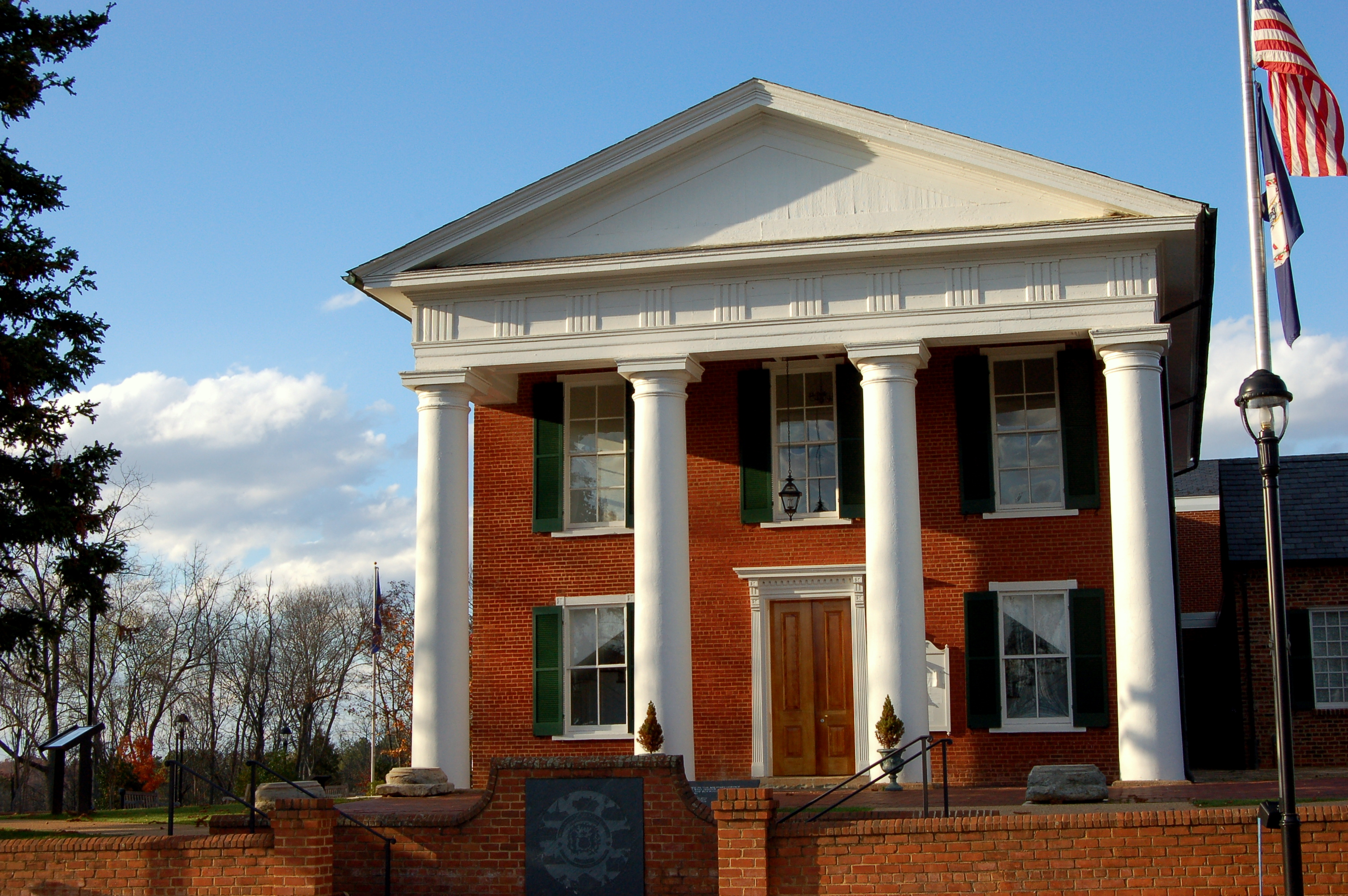
- County courthouse in Buckingham

- Location within Virginia Location within the United States
- Coordinates: 37°33′01″N 78°33′20″W
- Country: United States
- State: Virginia
- County: Buckingham

Area
  - Total: 1.121 sq mi (2.90 km^{2})
  - Land: 1.115 sq mi (2.89 km^{2})
  - Water: 0.006 sq mi (0.016 km^{2})
- Elevation: 449 ft (137 m)

Population (2020)
  - Total: 129
  - Density: 116/sq mi (44.7/km^{2})
- Time zone: UTC-5 (Eastern (EST))
  - Summer (DST): UTC-4 (EDT)
- ZIP Code: 23921
- Area code: 434
- GNIS feature ID: 1498458

Buckingham is a census-designated place (CDP; listed as Buckingham Courthouse) in and the county seat of Buckingham County, Virginia, United States. The population as of the 2020 Census was 129.

The town of Buckingham was established in 1818, and originally named Maysville, before the name was changed to that of the county.

The second courthouse, built between 1822 and 1824, was designed by Thomas Jefferson, but burned down in 1869. The current courthouse was completed on the same site in 1873.

== History ==
The Buckingham Courthouse Historic District and Woodside are listed on the National Register of Historic Places.

== Education ==
Buckingham County High School (9th Grade to 12th Grade) is located in Buckingham. The new Buckingham County Middle School (6th Grade to 8th Grade) is located down the road from the High School. Buckingham Primary School was renovated and became Buckingham Preschool located across the street from the high school. The former middle school and Dillwyn Elementary were expanded and renovated to become Buckingham County Primary (K-2nd Grade) and Buckingham County Elementary (3rd Grade to 5th Grade). In addition due to the expansion and budget cuts, Gold Hill Elementary in Arvonia/New Canton and Dillwyn Primary Schools were closed. The old Buckingham County Primary School which is located in Dillwyn Va. is now the Buckingham Library.

== Demographics ==
Historical population
Census	Pop.	Note	%±
2010	133		—
2020	129		−3.0%
U.S. Decennial Census; 2010 2020

Buckingham Courthouse was first listed as a census designated place in the 2010 U.S. census.

== Notable people ==
- Eugene Allen (July 14, 1919 – March 31, 2010) was a waiter and butler who worked for the White House for 34 years until he retired as the head butler in 1986. Allen's life was the inspiration for the 2013 film The Butler.
- Archibald Austin (1772–1837), born in Buckingham, United States Congressman from Virginia
- Thomas S. Bocock (1815–1891) United States and Confederate States congressman and lawyer, Speaker of the Confederate House of Representatives
- Carter Godwin Woodson (1875–1950), born in Buckingham, was an African American historian, author, journalist, the "Father of Black History," and founder of Black History Month.
- Satchidananda Saraswati (December 22, 1922 – August 19, 2002), also known as Sri Swami Satchidananda, born in Tamil Nadu India, was one of the first spiritual teachers to bring yoga to the United States. He founded Integral yoga (Satchidananda) and established its international headquarters in Buckingham. He opened the 1969 Woodstock Festival and his contributions in fields of interfaith education and preventive medicine have been widely recognized and honored internationally.
