= Gholson =

Gholson is a surname. Notable people with the surname include:

- Christien Gholson, American-born writer
- Christopher James Gholson (born 1983), American producer and rapper
- Ellen Anderson Gholson Glasgow (1873–1945), American novelist
- James Gholson (1798–1848), American politician
- Richard D. Gholson (1804–1862), American lawyer and politician
- Samuel J. Gholson (1808–1883), American judge
- Thomas Gholson, multiple people
- William Y. Gholson (1807–1870), American judge

== See also ==
- Gholson, Mississippi
- Gholson, Texas
