= Oak Corner, Virginia =

Unincorporated community in Virginia, United States

Coordinates: 37°59′49″N 77°18′59″W

Oak Corner is an unincorporated community in Caroline County, in the U.S. state of Virginia.

Spring Grove, the home of Daniel Coleman DeJarnette, Sr. was listed on the National Register of Historic Places in 1976.
