= Charles Fenton Collier =

American politician

Member of the Confederate Congress from Virginia's 4th District
- In office August 1862- February 1864
- Preceded by: Roger Atkinson Pryor
- Succeeded by: Thomas Saunders Gholson

Member of the Virginia House of Delegates from Petersburg
- In office December 5, 1859 – December 2, 1861
- Preceded by: H.P. Brown
- Succeeded by: Henry L. Hopkins

Member of the Virginia House of Delegates from Prince George and Surry Counties
- In office May 1852 – December 2, 1855
- Preceded by: Robert G. Rives
- Succeeded by: Benjamin Drew

Mayor of Petersburg, Virginia
- In office 1865–1868
- Preceded by: W.W. Townes
- Succeeded by: Rush Burgess

Mayor of Petersburg, Virginia
- In office 1889–1898
- Preceded by: T.J. Jarratt
- Succeeded by: John M. Pleasants

Personal details
- Born: September 27, 1828 Petersburg, Virginia, US
- Died: June 29, 1899 (aged 70) Petersburg, Virginia, US
- Party: Democratic, Whig
- Education: University of Virginia, Washington College
- Alma mater: Harvard Law School
- Profession: planter, lawyer, politician, railroad official

Charles Fenton Collier (1828 – June 29, 1899) was a Virginia lawyer and American politician who served in the Virginia House of Delegates representing first Prince George County then his native Petersburg before the American Civil War, then in the Confederate States House of Representatives and afterward twice became Petersburg's mayor.

In 1899, Collier shot himself in the head within his home. According to a news report by The New York Times, he was suffering from insomnia and melancholia at the time of his death. Collier's mentor Edmund Ruffin had previously committed suicide by gunshot.

== Early life, education and family ==
Collier was the first child born to the former Mary Ann Davis (a distant cousin of future Confederate President Jefferson Davis) and her Petersburg-based lawyer husband, Robert Ruffin Collier (1804-1870), son of Nathaniel Collier and grandson of Major John Collier III, who fought in the American Revolutionary War. This Collier's birth family would also include younger brothers James Edwin Collier (1832-1898), Nathaniel M. Collier (1841-1870) and Stirling Kennon Collier (1849-1939) and two sisters.

After education appropriate to his class in local schools, and possibly at a Brunswick County boarding school, Collier was sent in 1844 and 1845 to Charlottesville and Lexington to attend the University of Virginia and Washington College (now Washington and Lee University). He was then sent to Cambridge, Massachusetts to attend Harvard University, and received a law degree in 1848.

Charles Collier married Arabella Gee (1830-1890) from Surry County on March 14, 1848, but they had no children before she died on May 7, 1890. On June 24, 1891, Collier remarried, to 20-year old Mary Epes Jones, who also did not bear children but survived him. Collier was active in the Tabb Street Presbyterian Church, including leading its Sunday school as well as four times represented the East Hanover Presbytery at national assemblies.

== Career ==
Following his father's career path, Collier became a lawyer and practiced in his native Petersburg, but soon moved to Shellbanks, which was either a large plantation near Hampton, Virginia owned by former multi-term Elizabeth City County delegate Charles M. Collier who died in 1827, or a plantation in Prince George County, Virginia owned by Edmund Ruffin (known for his advocacy of slavery as well as advanced agricultural practices) and who made his main home in Petersburg since the 1840s, although the postmaster at Shellbanks in the 1830s. During this agricultural interlude (probably using enslaved labor), Collier won his first elective office, as the sole delegate for Prince George and Surry Counties at the special election following the death of planter and merchant Robert G. Rives. Collier represented the two counties (part-time) from 1852 until 1855, winning re-election in 1853.

Collier owned enslaved people, as did his father. In the 1850 census, Robert R. Collier (who did not list an occupation on the residential census) owned 22 slaves in Dinwiddie county (10 of them 6 years or younger), and 13 slaves at two locations in Petersburg, Charles Collier owned an additional 13 enslaved people in Petersburg in 1850. Ten years later, R.R. Collier owned (probably eight) slaves at three places in Dinwiddie County, and 18 enslaved people in Petersburg (including 2 black men, 7 black women of childbearing years and 6 children 6 years old or younger). During that last prewar census, Charles Collier only owned one 17 year old black woman, and his brother James owned an 11 year old black girl.

In 1857, Collier returned to his native Petersburg, and practiced law with his father. In May 1859, the city's voters elected him as their sole delegate in the Virginia House of Delegates. During the presidential election of 1860, Collier supported Stephen A. Douglas, and may have introduced him at a campaign stop in Petersburg. In the House of Delegates after Abraham Lincoln's election, Collier opposed holding a convention to consider secession (but lost).

After the Secession Convention voted to secede in April 1861, and Petersburg and other Virginia voters ratified that resolution in May, Collier volunteered as an aide to CSA Major General Walter Gwynn, a U.S. Army engineer turned railroad man who had helped plan the attack at Fort Sumter. Collier used the rank of Colonel during his operations near Norfolk. His military service proved short because Petersburg voters re-elected him as their delegate in late 1861, although he resigned that position on May 10, 1862, either because his father won a special election to become the sole state senator representing Petersburg and Prince George Counties, or because Collier himself won a special election to the Confederate Congress. Voters in Virginia's 4th district elected Collier to replace Confederate general Roger Atkinson Pryor in the First Confederate Congress. He took his seat August 18, 1862 and served until February 17, 1864, when his pardon application said he resigned, although it also said he ran for re-election and was defeated in a close contest (26 votes) by local Judge Thomas Saunders Gholson. During this period, his father Robert Ruffin Collier became known for an 1863 speech in the Virginia House of Delegates declaring slavery a Southern cultural institution. While a Confederate congressman, Collier served on a five-member committee investigating fraud in railroad transportation, and also delivered speeches advocating exemptions from draft laws for coal miners, postal workers and men older than 40. He also proposed that all captured African American soldiers become slaves of their captors. In June 1864, Collier withdrew his recount lawsuit and joined the local militia, which repulsed Union troops in June 1864, the beginning of the Siege of Petersburg. Collier then won election to the Petersburg City Council, which exempted him from further military service. His brothers enlisted as privates in the Confederate States Army: Nathaniel Macon Collier with the 12th Virginia Infantry on April 19, 1861, but received a medical discharge on May 23, 1861; James E. Collier with a Cavalry unit; and underage Stirling Kennon Collier as a courier for the quartermaster corps. Councilman Collier accompanied Mayor W.W. Townes and fellow councilman D'Arcy Paul as they surrendered Petersburg to Union forces following the Confederate evacuation on the night of April 2–3, 1865.

After the war, Collier took the required oath of allegiance on June 28, 1865, then petitioned for a presidential pardon, which (after followup) he received from President Andrew Johnson on February 1, 1867. Petersburg voters elected him mayor on May 7, 1866, and he won re-election, but resigned on March 25, 1868, perhaps ceding to federal pressure to remove former Confederates from office. However, this also occurred a week after he became president of the Petersburg Railroad Company, at the time carrying almost $112,800 in debt, which he managed to eliminate over the next four years before the board of directors replaced him on March 20, 1872, shortly before the Panic of 1873 led to the railroad's reorganization, much to the displeasure of Reuben Ragland, whose daughter Rosa Belle married Collier's widowed brother James E. Collier in 1863.

In May 1888, Collier defeated Republican Stith Bolling (a former delegate from Lunenburg County) to become Petersburg's mayor once again. The election proved a complete victory for Democrats in the city and Commonwealth, and ended the rule of former CSA General turned Republican political boss and Senator William Mahone). Collier won re-election to four consecutive two-year terms before losing in the April Democratic primary by five votes in April 1898 (and unsuccessfully sought a recount against former state senator John M. Pleasants; thus serving from 1888 to 1898).

== Death and legacy ==
Collier committed suicide at home during the morning of June 28, 1899 by shooting himself in the head. The New York Times reported the cause as "insomnia, melancholia, and nervous prostration." He was buried in the family gravesite at Petersburg's historic Blandford Cemetery. Following the Confederate surrender, his mentor Edmund Ruffin had committed suicide by gunshot; in 1915, his namesake nephew also committed suicide by gunshot.

== See also ==
- List of mayors of Petersburg, Virginia
