= Needham (Farmville, Virginia) =

Historic house in Virginia, United States

- U.S. National Register of Historic Places
- Virginia Landmarks Register
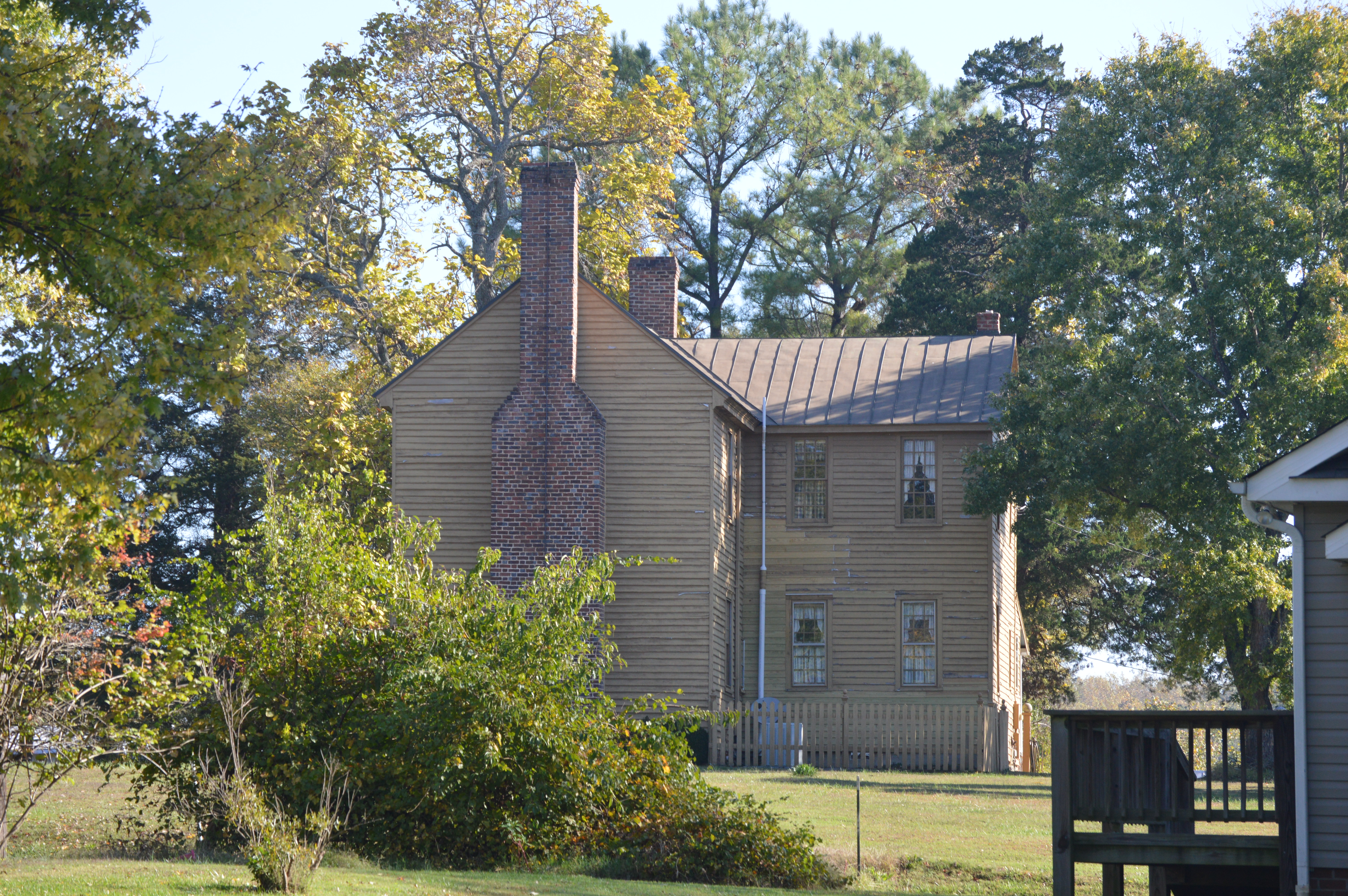
- Roadside view of the house

- Location within Virginia Location within the United States
- Location: State Route 45, 1.4 miles (2.3 km) north of the junction with US 460, near Farmville, Virginia
- Coordinates: 37°19′21″N 78°23′7″W
- Area: 1 acre (0.40 ha)
- Built: 1802
- Architectural style: Federal
- NRHP reference No.: 88002059
- VLR No.: 024-0030

Significant dates
- Added to NRHP: November 10, 1988
- Designated VLR: February 16, 1988

Needham is a historic home located near Farmville, in Cumberland County, Virginia. It was constructed in 1802, and is a two-story, three-bay, single-pile, central hall plan frame dwelling. It has a two-story rear ell, with one-story addition built in 1929, although most of the former outbuildings have now disappeared.

It was the home of educator, jurist, and politician Creed Taylor (1766–1836) as well as his son Creed Taylor Jr. (1791–1873). The elder Taylor established a proprietary law school in Richmond and moved it in the 1820s to this estate (it was Virginia's second law school and the nation's fourth), where it trained about 300 lawyers including U.S. President John Tyler's son, Ohio Supreme Court justice William Y. Gholson and future U.S. Congressmen John Minor Botts, Joseph William Chinn and John Hall Fulton as well as future Missouri governor and Confederate general Sterling Price. Although the law school had closed by 1840 (and perhaps a decade earlier, following the establishment of the University of Virginia Law School in 1829). In 1831 Anne Jane Gholson, the mother of novelist Ellen Glasgow was born at Needham.

Needham has been listed on the National Register of Historic Places since 1988. Virginia erected a historic marker concerning the proprietary law school in 2000.
