= Francis E. Rives =

American politician

Member of the U.S. House of Representatives from Virginia's 2nd district
- In office March 4, 1837 – March 4, 1841
- Preceded by: John Y. Mason
- Succeeded by: George B. Cary

Member of the Virginia Senate from Amelia, Powhatan and Chesterfield Counties and the City of Petersburg
- In office 1848–1850
- Preceded by: James Cox
- Succeeded by: District abolished

Member of the Virginia Senate from Isle of Wight, Prince George, Southampton, Surry and Sussex Counties
- In office 1831–1835
- Preceded by: John Y. Mason
- Succeeded by: George B. Cary

Member of the Virginia House of Delegates from Prince George County
- In office 1821–1830; Alongside Nathaniel Colley, James Temple, Allen Temple, George Harrison
- Preceded by: Multi-member district before 1830
- Succeeded by: William Shands

Personal details
- Born: Francis Everod Rives; January 14, 1792 Prince George County, Virginia
- Died: December 26, 1861 (aged 69) Petersburg, Virginia
- Resting place: Blandford Cemetery, Petersburg, Virginia
- Party: Democratic
- Occupation: planter, businessman

Francis Everod Rives (January 14, 1792 – December 26, 1861) was an American Democratic politician and businessman who served two terms in the United States House of Representatives. After making his fortune as a slave trader, Rives became a planter and soon won election and re-election multiple times to both houses of the Virginia General Assembly before his two terms representing Virginia's 2nd congressional district, and afterward represented several counties near Petersburg in the Virginia Senate as well as served as the city's mayor. Rives also helped establish the state-chartered Petersburg Railroad.

== Early and family life ==
Born in Prince George County, near Petersburg, Virginia, Rives received a private education appropriate to his class. He also served as an ensign in the state militia during the War of 1812, stationed in Norfolk.

Rives in October 1833 married Eliza Jane Pegram Rives (1802–1874), who survived him and bore several children, including a daughter, Mary Chieves Rives Frazer (1821–1851).

== Business and political career ==
In 1818, Rives and his neighbors Peyton Mason Sr. and Jr. formed a slave trading partnership. The business known as "Peyton Mason and Company" bought bondspeople in Virginia and walked them further south. Rives twice personally drove coffles of enslaved people through Fayetteville, North Carolina and westward to Tennessee and some all the way down the Natchez Trace to Natchez, Mississippi.

Having thus made his fortune, Rives became a planter himself, and also sought political office. Prince George County voters elected and re-elected Rives as one of their (part-time) representatives in the Virginia House of Delegates from 1821 to 1831. He then joined the Democratic party and successfully won election to the State senate, where he represented Prince George and neighboring Isle of Wight, Southampton, Surry and Sussex Counties from 1831 to 1836, and later from 1848 to 1851.

Rives may have worked as an agent for the slavetrading firm Franklin and Armfield in the 1830s. In the 1840 census, Rives considered himself a resident of Sussex County and 27 of the 37 people in his household were enslaved. In the 1840s and 1850s, he made Petersburg his official residence. In 1840 he listed his occupation as "Law", and he and his wife lived with a young doctor, an elderly non-relative and young girl (possibly all servants), in 1860, Rives listed himself as "Gentleman" and lived with three other white adults in central Petersburg. Rives also owned 13 enslaved people in the city in 1850, and N.F. Rives an additional 8 persons (6 of them under 12 years old) in Petersburg, A decade later, F.E. Rives owned 33 enslaved people in Petersburg. Moreover, in 1850 John E. Rives owned 34 enslaved people in Sussex County. In 1860, G.E. Rives owned 6 slaves in Prince George County, and John E. Rives owned 35 slaves in Sussex County.

Rives won election and re-election as a Democrat to the Twenty-fifth and Twenty-sixth Congresses (March 4, 1837 – March 3, 1841), but chose not to seek re-election in 1840. While a Congressman, he served as chairman of the Committee on Elections (Twenty-sixth Congress).

In addition to his plantations, Rives worked to build and manage railways in Virginia and North Carolina. He was a principal of the Petersburg Railroad, and sometimes accused of chicanery for his efforts to boost Petersburg at the expense of railroad competitors as well as Portsmouth, its port city rival. Petersburg voters elected him as the city's mayor, and he served from May 6, 1847, to May 5, 1848.

== Death and legacy ==
Francis Rives died in late 1861, possibly on November 30 at Littleton in Sussex County, or on December 26, 1861, in Petersburg. He is interred in Blandford Cemetery in Petersburg.

== Electoral history ==
- 1837; Rives was elected to the U.S. House of Representatives with 80.61% of the vote, defeating fellow Democrat William B. Goodwyn.
- 1839; Rives was re-elected with 57.6% of the vote, defeating Whig James W. Pegram.

== See also ==
- List of mayors of Petersburg, Virginia

== Sources ==
- United States Congress. "Francis E. Rives (id: R000284)". Biographical Directory of the United States Congress.

U.S. House of Representatives
| Preceded by John Y. Mason | Member of the U.S. House of Representatives from Virginia's 2nd congressional district 1837–1841 | Succeeded by George B. Cary |
