= William R. Smith =

William R. Smith may refer to:

- William Ramsay Smith (1859–1937), Australian anthropologist
- Sir William Reardon Smith (1856–1935), British shipowner
- William R. Smith (Utah politician) (1826–1894), Utah territorial politician and Mormon religious leader
- William Redwood Smith (1851–1935), Associate Justice of the Kansas Supreme Court
- William Robert Smith (1863–1924), member of the U.S. House of Representatives from Texas (1903–1916)
- William Robertson Smith (1846–1894), philologist, physicist, archaeologist, and biblical scholar
- William Roy Smith (1876–1938), American historian
- William Roy Smith (politician) (1920–1993), American politician from Virginia
- William Russell Smith (1815–1896), member of the U.S. House of Representatives from Alabama (1851–1856)
- William Rudolph Smith (1787–1868), Attorney General of Wisconsin
- William Ruthven Smith (1868–1941), U.S. army officer and Superintendent of the U.S. Military Academy
- William R. Smith 4-4-0 locomotive, used for a short portion of the 1862 Andrews Railroad Raid

== See also ==
- William Smith (disambiguation)
