= John Caskie =

American politician

John Samuel Caskie
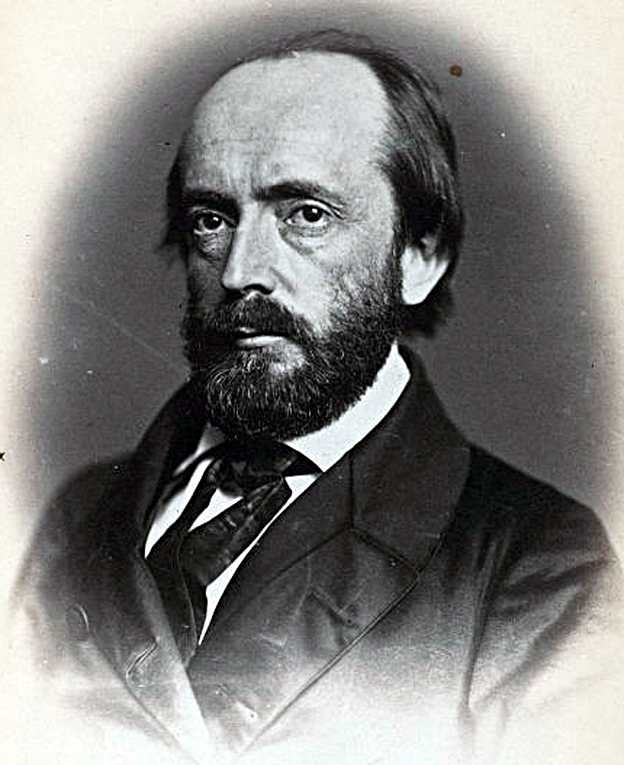

Member of the U.S. House of Representatives from Virginia
- In office March 4, 1851 – March 3, 1859
- Preceded by: James Seddon (6th); Thomas H. Averett (3rd)
- Succeeded by: Paulus Powell (6th); Daniel C. DeJarnette (3rd)
- Constituency: 6th district (1851-53); 3rd district (1853-59)

Personal details
- Born: November 8, 1821 Richmond, Virginia
- Died: December 16, 1869 (aged 48) Richmond, Virginia
- Resting place: Hollywood Cemetery, Richmond, Virginia
- Party: Democratic
- Education: University of Virginia
- Profession: lawyer

John Samuel Caskie (November 8, 1821 – December 16, 1869) was a nineteenth-century congressman, lawyer, judge and Confederate soldier from Virginia.

== Early life and education ==
Born at Manchester (now a neighborhood in Richmond, Virginia), to the former Eliza Randolph Pincham and her husband James Caskie. This boy was the eldest of seven children, with six younger sisters and a much younger brother James who eventually moved to Fauquier County, Virginia. Their father James Caskie and his brother John Caskie had emigrated from Scotland as representatives of a tobacco exporting commercial firm in county Ayr, with John settling in Lynchburg and James near Richmond, where he eventually became president of the Bank of Virginia located there. Young John Caskie received a private education locally and entered the University of Virginia in 1838. He graduated with a M.A. degree in 1841, then read law. However, his health was never robust, and he traveled to Europe with a cousin in 1842.

== Career ==
Admitted to the Virginia bar circa 1843, Caskie began a legal practice in Richmond. In December 1845, Judge Philip Norborne Nicholas appointed him Commonwealth attorney (prosecutor) for Richmond and Henrico County. On March 14, 1850, the Virginia General Assembly elected Caskie to replace the deceased Judge Nicholas as judge of the Richmond and Henrico circuits, but he resigned the position after about 18 months to run for Congress. In the 1850 census, 29 year old Caskie owned no slaves but real estate valued at $1000 in Richmond and lived with his wife (as discussed below) as well as a slightly younger lawyer, Marmaduke Johnson (age 25, possibly his brother in law) and a 19-year-old woman, Harriet Chapman, who may have been a servant or boarder.

Politically a follower of John C. Calhoun, and protege of James Alexander Seddon (who served 2 terms in Congress and eventually became the CSA Secretary of War), Caskie delivered stump speeches for states rights Democrats beginning in 1842, despite the initial political dominance of the Whig part in Richmond and vicinity. When Seddon withdrew from the 1850 congressional campaign, Caskie eagerly took his place and was elected a Democrat to the United States House of Representatives for the Virginia's 6th congressional district in a close 3-way race defeating incumbent John Minor Botts . Despite congressional redistricting following the 1850 census, Caskie was re-elected three times from what had become the Virginia's 3rd congressional district (comprising Caroline, Chesterfield, Goochland, Hanover, Henrico, King William and Goochland Counties). He played an important behind-the scenes role in passage of the Kansas-Nebraska Act, and rose to become a senior member of the Committee on the Judiciary during the last three Congresses in which he served. However, in 1858, Caskie was defeated for re-election in the Democratic primary by Daniel Coleman DeJarnette.

Caskie then resumed practicing law, but did not grow wealthy. During the Civil War, he enlisted several times as a private or corporal in various artillery and reserve infantry units, including on April 25, 1861, but was discharged two months later, possibly because of infirmities or his young and after 1862 motherless family. Following the war, Caskie attempted to revive his legal practice.

== Personal life ==
Caskie married Fannie Johnson, daughter of celebrated Chesterfield county horse breeder William Ransom Johnson, in Richmond circa 1849, and she died in Richmond in 1862. They had five children: four sons (John S. Caskie Jr, James Caskie, William R. J. Caskie, and George Caskie) and daughter Lizzie Caskie (who married D.C. Jackson and moved to Lynchburg). In the 1860 census, Caskie owned an enslaved 75-year-old woman and 45-year-old man in Richmond, both presumably house servants.

== Death and legacy ==
Caskie died at his Richmond, Virginia home on December 16, 1869 and was interred there in Richmond's historic Hollywood Cemetery. His son James Caskie (b. 1852) became a lawyer in Richmond in 1873 and served 8 years as a member of Richmond's common council, including four years as its President. The youngest son, George Caskie, became a lawyer in Lynchburg.

== Elections ==
- 1851; Caskie was elected to the U.S. House of Representatives with 54.49% of the vote, defeating Whig John Minor Botts.
- 1853; Caskie was re-elected with 54.89% of the vote, defeating Whig Clayton G. Coleman.
- 1855; Caskie was re-elected with 52.12% of the vote, defeating American William C. Scott.
- 1857; Caskie was re-elected 63.72% of the vote, defeating American A. Judson Crane.
- 1859; Caskie was defeated for re-election.

U.S. House of Representatives
Preceded by James Seddon	Member of the U.S. House of Representatives from Virginia's 6th congressional district 1851–1853	Succeeded by Paulus Powell
Preceded by Thomas H. Averett	Member of the U.S. House of Representatives from Virginia's 3rd congressional district 1853–1859	Succeeded by Daniel C. DeJarnette
