= George B. Cary =

American horse breeder and politician (1811-1850)

Member of the U.S. House of Representatives from Virginia's 2nd district
- In office March 4, 1841 – March 4, 1843
- Preceded by: Francis E. Rives
- Succeeded by: George Dromgoole

Personal details
- Born: George Booth Cary; 1811 Bonny Doon, Southampton County, Virginia, US
- Died: February 26, 1850 (aged 47–48) Southampton County, Virginia, US
- Party: Democratic-Republican Party
- Occupation: Horse breeder and planter

George Booth Cary (ca. 1802 – February 26, 1850) was an American politician, horse breeder, and planter. He served one term in the United States House of Representatives as a Democrat from Virginia. He was also a planter known for breeding thoroughbred horses,

== Early life ==
Cary was born c. 1802 at his family estate, Bonny Doon, near Courtland, Virginia. His mother was the formerly widowed Elizabeth Booth Yates, the third wife of Southampton County planter Miles Cary. Cary had a slightly younger full sister, as well as half-sisters from his father's previous marriages. His father died in the summer of 1806, followed by his mother in 1815.

His brother-in-law, John Stith of Petersburg, Virginia, took responsibility for Cary's education. Cary had a liberal education. When Cary reached the legal age of 21, he became the guardian of his younger sister until she reached legal age or married.

== Career ==
Cary inherited 75 enslaved people and three plantations in Southampton County, which he (or his guardians until he reached legal age) operated using enslaved labor. He may also have been an attorney. Cary became known as one of the county's leading thoroughbred breeders. He owned about 4,350 acres in Southampton County, much uncultivatable swamp or pine barrens, and about 120 enslaved people on his death.

In 1830, Cary was a trustee of a preparatory board school, located near Jerusalem, Virginia. In 1836, he served on Southampton's corresponding committee for the Martin Van Buren ticket.

In 1840, Cary was elected as a candidate for the Virginia's 2nd Congressional district (at the time including Petersburg as well as Greensville, Prince George, Southampton, Surry and Sussex counties) at the Democratic Republican Convention. In 1841, Cary was elected to the U.S. House of Representatives with 56.52% of the vote, defeating Robert R. Collier, variously identified as an Independent or Whig. He served in the Twenty-seventh Congress from March 4, 1841 to March 3, 1843. Cary supported states' rights, opposed a national bank, and endorsed the veto message for the bank national bank given by fellow Virginian (now U.S. President) Tyler. Cary also unsuccessfully tried to read into the Congressional Record resolutions adopted at a public meeting in Petersburg which denounced protective tariffs. Cary and fellow Virginian John Minor Botts also sponsored a bill to exempt the Petersburg Railway, then under construction, from new tariffs on iron rails, but the bill failed to pass. Cary did not seek re-election.

In July 1844, Governor James McDowell appointed Cary one of three Southampton County commissioners to oversee the selection of electors for the presidential and vice-presidential election.

== Personal life ==
On March 1, 1825, having reached legal age, Cary signed a marriage bond in Southampton County to marry the young widow Martha P. Blunt Urquhart, who died about a decade later having given birth to a daughter, who died young. When he married, Cary had a house built, which he called Midfield, near Capron, Virginia.

Cary spent his final years attending to his plantations and horses. He committed suicide by cutting his throat, probably at his Southampton County home, on February 26, 1850. He was buried in the family cemetery on Bonny Doon.

U.S. House of Representatives
Preceded by Francis E. Rives	Member of the U.S. House of Representatives from Virginia's 2nd congressional district 1841–1843	Succeeded by George Dromgoole
