= Thomas Gholson =

Thomas Gholson may refer to:

- Thomas Gholson Jr. (1780–1816), American lawyer and politician
- Thomas Saunders Gholson (1808–1868), American lawyer, judge and politician
