= Mark Alexander (politician) =

American politician (1792–1883)

Mark Alexander, Jr.

Member of the U.S. House of Representatives from Virginia
- In office March 4, 1819 – March 4, 1833
- Preceded by: Thomas M. Nelson (18th); William McCoy (4th)
- Succeeded by: Joseph Johnson (18th); James Gholson (4th)
- Constituency: 18th district (1819-23); 4th district (1823-33)

Chairman of the Committee on the District of Columbia
- In office March 4, 1825 – March 3, 1829
- Preceded by: Edward Lloyd
- Succeeded by: Gershom Powers

Member of the Virginia House of Delegates from Mecklenburg County
- In office 1845 Serving with William Goode
- Preceded by: William Baskerville
- Succeeded by: Edwin A. Williams
- In office 1815 – 1818 Serving with Armistead Burwell, Edward Tarry and Peyton R. Burwell
- Preceded by: John C. Goode
- Succeeded by: David Shelton

Personal details
- Born: February 7, 1792 "Salem" plantation, Mecklenburg County, Virginia
- Died: July 5, 1883 (aged 91) Scotland Neck, North Carolina
- Resting place: Scotland Neck, North Carolina
- Party: Crawford Democratic-Republican (before 1825)
- Other political affiliations: Jacksonian (after 1825)
- Children: 4 sons, four daughters
- Education: University of North Carolina

Mark Alexander (February 7, 1792 – July 5, 1883) was a nineteenth-century Virginia lawyer, planter and politician who served in the Virginia House of Delegates and the U.S. House of Representatives before possibly becoming the richest man in Mecklenburg County, Virginia. However, the American Civil War ruined him financially, and he died at the North Carolina home of his daughter and son-in-law.

== Early life and education ==
Born on his father's Salem plantation near the Roanoke River and Lombardy Grove as well as Boydton, Virginia in eastern Mecklenburg County, to the former Lucy Bugg (1764-1792) and her planter husband Col. Mark Leigh Alexander (1760-1824). Alexander lost his mother and twin brother around the time of his birth, and his father remarried twice, so this man had two half-brothers and four half-sisters who reached adulthood under his guardianship after their father's death. Both his grandfathers (Col. Moses Alexander Jr. and Jacob Bugg Jr.) fought as patriots during the American Revolutionary War. His father was elected to the Virginia House of Delegates when this man was a boy, and his uncle Nathaniel Alexander would also have a political career, including as a North Carolina legislator, then the state's Governor and a member of Congress (as would this man). Meanwhile, Mark received a private education suitable to his class, first at a local school in Virginia, then an academy in Louisburg, North Carolina. He began attending the University of North Carolina in 1807, and continued for three years but never graduated. He returned to Virginia and read law.

== Legal and political career ==
Admitted to the Virginia bar, Alexander began his legal practice in Boydton, the Mecklenburg county seat, and nearby areas. He won his first election in 1815, becoming one of Mecklenburg County's two (part-time) representatives in the Virginia House of Delegates (1815 to 1819). In 1818 Alexander was elected as a Democratic-Republican to the United States House of Representatives, and won re-election several times before 1833, although his political allegiances changed somewhat so Alexander became a Crawford Republican and eventually a Jacksonian Democrat. Alexander served as chairman of the Committee on the District of Columbia from 1825 to 1829. An advocate of state's rights and strict construction of the Constitution, Alexander associated with North Carolina Congressman Nathaniel Macon, as well as Virginia politicians John Randolph of Roanoke and Littleton Waller Tazewell. Alexander declined to run for another Congressional term in 1832, not long after his marriage described below and decision to concentrate on his plantations. [Nathaniel Alexander who served in both houses of the Virginia General Assembly representing Mecklenburg County in the 1820s—and also Halifax County in the Virginia Senate—was likely his half-brother, born 1796].

Mark Alexander served as one of four delegates to the Virginia Constitutional Convention of 1829-1830, representing a district consisting of Brunswick, Dinwiddie, Lunenburg and Mecklenburg Counties alongside William H. Brodnax, George C. Dromgoole and William O. Goode. In that convention, Alexander spoke relatively little, but in one speech criticized fellow delegates for valuing party over principle, as well as expressed concern over the power being given to the governor. That constitution was the first explicitly recognizing slavery in Virginia, and also granted men from the Commonwealth's western region more voting rights. Mecklenburg County voters elected Alexander to the Virginia House of Delegates one last time in 1845, and served alongside William O. Goode then declined renomination. Also, despite his wishes, Alexander was nominated to become one of six men representing Halifax, Pittsylvania and Mecklenburg Counties in the Virginia Constitutional Convention of 1850, but was not elected.

== Personal life ==
Alexander married Sally Park Turner (1811-1889) on June 1, 1831, although their ages differed by nearly two decades. Her late father, James Turner had served as North Carolina's Governor, as well as in Congress with Alexander. The couple had four sons and four daughters, of whom three sons (James T., Robert and Mark) and two daughters (Mary Elizabeth Alexander Baskerville and Mary Rebecca Alexander Smith) reached adulthood.

== Planter ==
After his marriage Alexander mostly retired from political life and concentrated on managing his large plantations. The family lived at his father's former Salem plantation until 1845, when Alexander finished a new brick house on a plantation slightly to the west that he called "Park Forest." He would lose all his property, including Park Forest, in 1880, although the new owners allowed him and his wife to rent that property for about two years before they moved to live with their daughter Rebecca and her husband, Norfleet Smith, in Scotland Neck, North Carolina.

As the Civil War began, Alexander owned about 4000 acres of land in Virginia, North Carolina and Mississippi, much developed as plantations and operated using enslaved labor. His Mecklenburg County Virginia plantations included about 105 slaves. His eldest son James Turner Alexander (1832-1915) also owned 37 slaves in Mecklenburg County in 1860 One North Carolina plantation had, depending on estimates, between 30 and 100 slaves. His eldest son, CSA Capt. James T. Alexander in early 1862 raised an artillery company in Mecklenburg County called the Oliver Grays, which later was reassigned to an infantry battalion, then after the conflict became active in Confederate veterans' organizations in Virginia and Louisiana.

== Later life and death ==
Shortly before his death, the Richmond Daily Dispatch interviewed Alexander, and other newspapers also recognized him as the oldest living former Congressman, as well as his immediate financial straits. Alexander died on July 5 or 6, 1883, possibly from complications from a broken hip, survived by his widow and several children and grandchildren. He was interred in the Trinity Episcopal Church Cemetery in Scotland Neck, North Carolina. The Virginia Museum of History and Culture has his widow's diaries. Chester Harding painted Alexander's portrait, probably during the 1829-1830 convention.

== Elections ==
- 1823; Alexander was elected to the U.S. House of Representatives unopposed.
- 1825; Alexander was re-elected unopposed.
- 1827; Alexander was re-elected unopposed.
- 1829; Alexander was re-elected unopposed.
- 1831; Alexander was re-elected unopposed.

U.S. House of Representatives
Preceded by Thomas M. Nelson	Member of the U.S. House of Representatives from Virginia's 18th congressional district 1819–1823	Succeeded by Joseph Johnson
Preceded by William McCoy	Member of the U.S. House of Representatives from Virginia's 4th congressional district 1823–1833	Succeeded by James Gholson
