= Thomas Saunders Gholson =

American judge (1808–1868)

Member of the Second Confederate Congress from Prince George, Virginia
- In office March 1864 – May 1865
- Preceded by: Charles Fenton Collier
- Succeeded by: position abolished

Judge of the Virginia Circuit Court in Brunswick County, Virginia
- In office 1858–1863

Personal details
- Born: 9 December 1808 Brunswick County, Virginia, US
- Died: 12 December 1868 (aged 60) Savannah, Georgia, US
- Resting place: Blandford Cemetery, Petersburg, Virginia, US
- Spouse: Cary Ann Gholson
- Occupation: Lawyer, politician, judge

Thomas Saunders Gholson (9 December 1808 – 12 December 1868) was a Virginia lawyer, judge and Confederate politician.

== Early and family life ==
He was born on 9 December 1808, in Gholsonville, Virginia, to Major William Gholson and Mary Saunders, and was the younger brother of James Gholson. Their uncle was Thomas Gholson Jr. He graduated from the University of Virginia in 1827.

On May 14, 1829, Thomas Gholson married his cousin, the congressman's daughter Cary Ann Gholson, and they had two daughters and a son.

== Career ==
After reading law and being admitted to the Virginia bar, around 1836, Thomas Gholson also invested in the Brunswick Land Company, as did his elder and politically active brother and several other prominent local men (including Rev. Richard Kidder Meade). Each bought $1000 shares of the company, which bought, traded and speculated in lands in Texas. In 1847, the Virginia House of Delegates received a complaint against his brother Judge James H. Gholson, alleging favoritism towards Thomas Gholson, among others. When the complainant, R. H. Collier, who had also publicly assaulted one of the Gholsons, refused to testify under oath before the appointed committee, the legislative investigation was dropped, but his brother died the following year. Thomas Gholson was a legal and possibly legislative mentor to Hugh White Sheffey who served in the legislature and also became Speaker of the Virginia House of Delegates during the American Civil War, and later a judge.

Around 1850, after his brother's death, Thomas moved his family to Blandford, which is closer to (and now part of) Petersburg. Although owning only $7500 in property in 1850 (shortly after his brother's death), by 1860 Thomas Saunders Gholson owned $100,000 in real estate and $120,000 in personal property. Petersburg became a railroad hub in this era; Judge Gholson was president of several railroads, and also worked to support a public library in Petersburg.

Virginia's legislators confirmed Thomas Gholson as a state court judge, and he served from 1859 to 1863, when he resigned to serve in the House of Representatives of the Second Confederate Congress. He defeated Petersburg lawyer Charles Fenton Collier (son of Robert Ruffin Collier, possibly the complainant years earlier) and represented Prince George County, Virginia(which adjoins Petersburg) as well as nearby Nottaway, Amelia, Powhatan and Cumberland Counties from 1864 until the war's end in 1865. On February 1, 1865, Gholson delivered a speech concerning the possibility of using Negro troops, which was published. Thomas Gholson received a pardon from President Andrew Johnson on September 6, 1865.

== Death and legacy ==
Gholson died on 12 December 1868, in Savannah, Georgia, and his remains were returned to Virginia for burial at Blandford Cemetery.
