= J. Ambler Smith =

American politician

John Ambler Smith
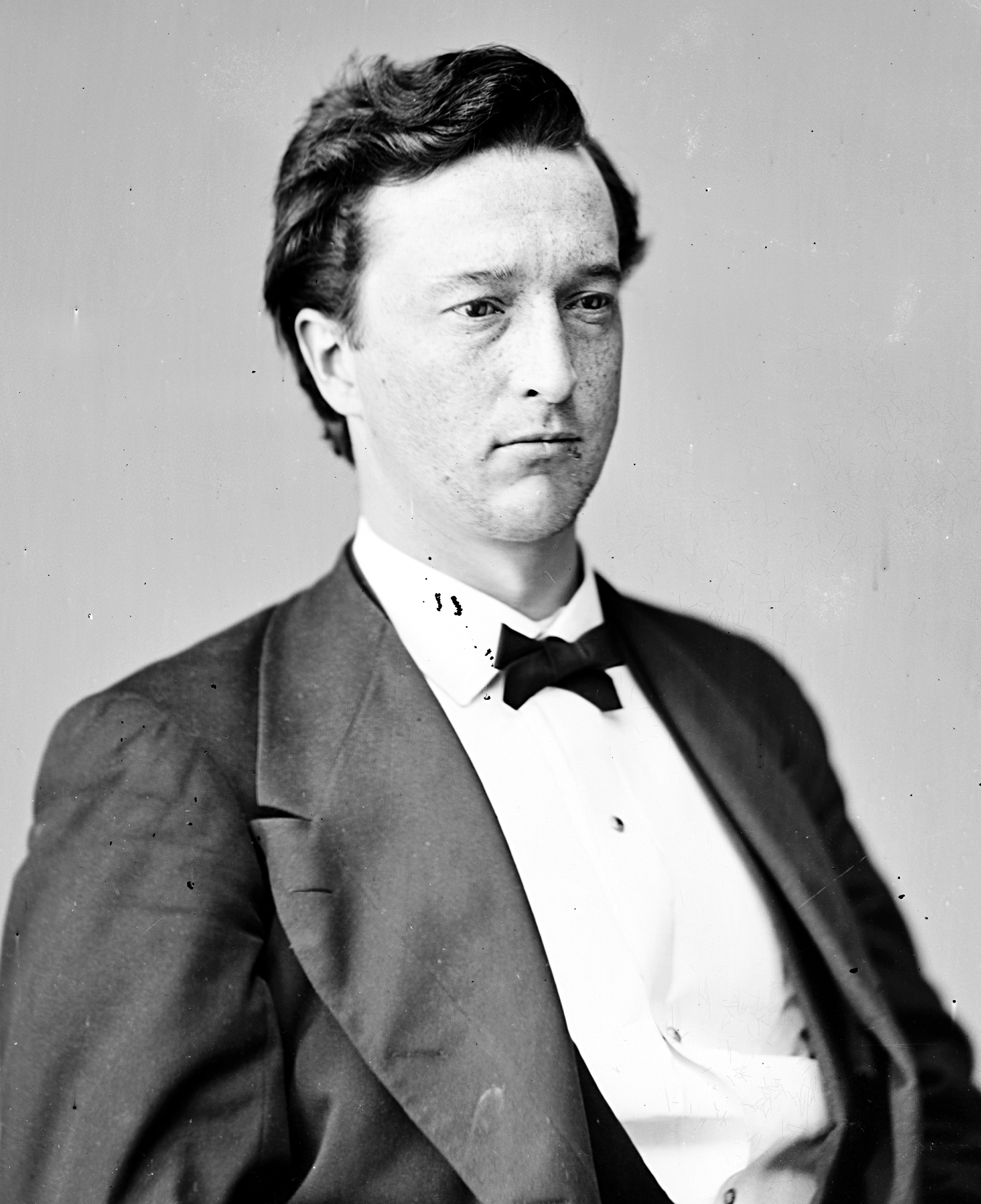

Member of the U.S. House of Representatives from Virginia's 3rd district
- In office March 4, 1873 – March 3, 1875
- Preceded by: Charles H. Porter
- Succeeded by: Gilbert Carlton Walker

Member of the Virginia Senate
- In office 1869

Personal details
- Born: September 23, 1847 Village View, Dinwiddie County, Virginia
- Died: January 6, 1892 (aged 44) Washington, D.C.
- Resting place: Glenwood Cemetery, Washington, D.C.
- Party: Republican
- Education: Richmond College
- Profession: Lawyer

John Ambler Smith (September 23, 1847 – January 6, 1892) was a U.S. representative from Virginia.

== Early and family life ==
Born at Village View plantation, near Dinwiddie Court House, Virginia, to Dr. John Harvie Smith and his wife, Smith was born to the First Families of Virginia. His grandfather Larkin Smith had served in the Virginia House of Delegates representing King and Queen County and even became its Speaker. John received an education appropriate for his class, then traveled to Richmond to attend David Turner's high school while his father was a surgeon for the Confederate States Army, and ran Chimborazo Hospital in that city. Following the American Civil War, he studied law at Richmond College and graduated.

== Career ==
Admitted to the bar in 1867, Smith began a private legal practice in Richmond, Virginia. He was appointed commissioner in chancery of the courts of Richmond in 1868. He served as Commonwealth attorney of Charles City and New Kent Counties. He served as member of the State senate in 1869.

Smith was elected as a Republican to the Forty-third Congress (March 4, 1873 – March 3, 1875) with 51.11% of the vote, defeating Democrat George Douglas Wise. He was an unsuccessful candidate for renomination in 1874. He resumed the practice of law in Washington, D.C. He served as member of the immigration commission to London.

== Death and legacy ==
He died in Washington, D.C., on January 6, 1892. He was interred in Glenwood Cemetery.

== Bibliography ==
- Bailey, N. Louise; Morgan, Mary L.; Taylor, Carolyn R. (1986). Biographical Directory of the South Carolina Senate: 1776-1985. Volume 1. Columbia, S.C.: University of South Carolina Press. ISBN 0872494799.
- United States Congress. "J. Ambler Smith (id: S000568)". Biographical Directory of the United States Congress.

U.S. House of Representatives
Preceded by Charles H. Porter	Member of the U.S. House of Representatives from Virginia's 3rd congressional district 1873–1875	Succeeded by Gilbert Carlton Walker
