= Horace Wilder =

American judge

Ohio Supreme Court Judge
- In office December 12, 1863 – February 9, 1865
- Appointed by: David Tod
- Preceded by: William Y. Gholson
- Succeeded by: Luther Day

Member of the Ohio House of Representatives from the Ashtabula County district
- In office December 1, 1834 – December 6, 1835
- Preceded by: G. W. St. John, Ira Benton
- Succeeded by: Ora H. Knapp, C. Champlin

Personal details
- Born: August 20, 1802 West Hartland, Connecticut, U.S.
- Died: December 26, 1889 (aged 87) Red Wing, Minnesota, U.S.
- Resting place: Conneaut Cemetery, Conneaut, Ohio
- Spouse: Phoebe Jerusha Coleman
- Education: Yale University

Horace Wilder (August 20, 1802 – December 26, 1889) was a Republican politician in Ohio. He was in the Ohio House of Representatives, and was an Ohio Supreme Court Judge from 1863 to 1865.

== Life ==
Horace Wilder was born at West Hartland, Connecticut, and graduated from Yale University in 1823. He moved to Virginia, where he taught school, and was admitted to the bar January, 1826. He returned to Connecticut, then moved to Ohio in 1827. He settled in Ashtabula in 1828, where he was admitted to the Ohio bar.

In 1833, Wilder was elected Prosecuting Attorney of Ashtabula County. He represented Ashtabula County in the Ohio House of Representatives in the 33rd General Assembly, (December, 1834–June, 1835).

In 1855, Wilder was elected common pleas judge for a seven-year term. In 1863, he was appointed by Governor David Tod to the Ohio Supreme Court to fill the vacancy from the resignation of Justice William Y. Gholson. The next year he was elected to fill the remainder of Gholson's term, but was not nominated for re-election. He resumed private practice in Ashtabula, and moved to Red Wing, Minnesota, in May, 1867, where he died December 26, 1889. He was buried next to his wife in the cemetery in Conneaut, Ohio.

Wilder was married March 27, 1833 to Phoebe Jerusha Coleman in Ashtabula. They had five children.

== See also ==
- List of justices of the Ohio Supreme Court
