= Thomas M. Nelson =

American politician (1782–1853)

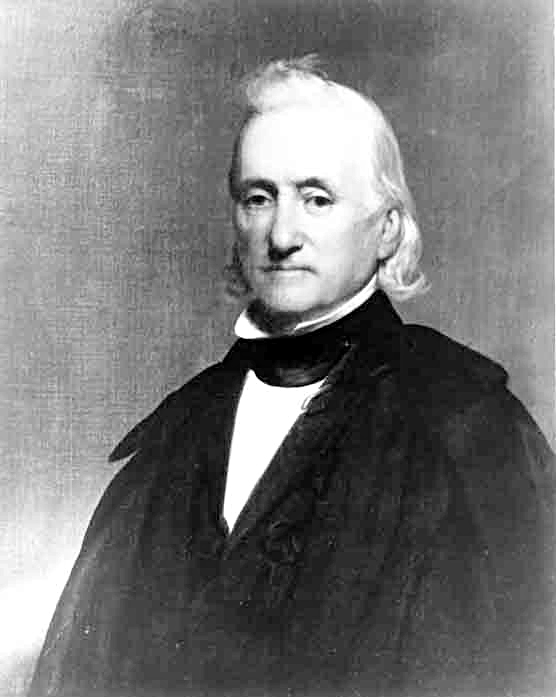

Member of the U.S. House of Representatives from Virginia's 18th congressional district
- In office December 4, 1816 – March 3, 1819
- Preceded by: Thomas Gholson, Jr.
- Succeeded by: Mark Alexander

Personal details
- Born: September 27, 1782 Mecklenburg County, Virginia
- Died: November 10, 1853 (aged 71) Columbus, Georgia
- Resting place: Lindwood Cemetery, Columbus, Georgia
- Party: Democratic-Republican

Military service
- Allegiance: United States
- Branch/service: United States Army
- Years of service: 1812–1815
- Rank: Major
- Battles/wars: War of 1812

Thomas Maduit Nelson (September 27, 1782 – November 10, 1853) was a 19th-century politician from Virginia, United States.

== Early and family life ==
Born in Oak Hill, Mecklenburg County, Virginia, Nelson was born among the First Families of Virginia, to Major John Nelson (d.1827), who established the Oak Hill plantation, and his wife, Ann Carter. His parents had married in the chapel of the College of William and Mary on July 25, 1781. The boy was probably named after his grandfather, Thomas Nelson, a planter and politician who served in both houses of the Virginia General Assembly, particularly as the secretary of the Governor's Council, or his great-grandfather who had emigrated from England and established a successful mercantile company in Yorktown, Virginia. Nelson received an education appropriate to his class.

== Career ==
During the War of 1812, Nelson was commissioned a captain to the 10th Infantry Regiment and was later promoted to major in the 13th and 18th Infantry Regiments. After the war, he was reduced back to a captain and eventually resigned from his commission on May 15, 1815.

Despite his lack of previous legislative experience, upon the death of Thomas Gholson, Nelson was elected a Democratic-Republican to the United States House of Representatives to fill that vacancy in 1816, and won re-election once, thus serving until 1819.

== Death and legacy ==
Nelson moved to Georgia and died near Columbus, Georgia at age 71 and was interred there in Linwood Cemetery.

U.S. House of Representatives
Preceded by Thomas Gholson, Jr.	Member of the U.S. House of Representatives from Virginia's 18th congressional district 1816 – 1819	Succeeded by Mark Alexander
