= Thomas Gholson Jr. =

American politician (1780–1816)

Member of the U.S. House of Representatives from Virginia's 17th district
- In office November 7, 1808 – March 3, 1813
- Preceded by: John Claiborne
- Succeeded by: James Pleasants

Member of the U.S. House of Representatives from Virginia's 18th district
- In office March 3, 1813 – July 4, 1816
- Preceded by: Peterson Goodwyn
- Succeeded by: Thomas M. Nelson

Member of the Virginia House of Delegates from Brunswick County
- In office December 1, 1806 – 1809 Serving with James Harrison
- Preceded by: Thomas Maclin
- Succeeded by: Philip Pryor

Personal details
- Born: 1780 Brunswick, Virginia, US
- Died: July 14, 1816 (aged 35–36) Brunswick County, Virginia, US
- Party: Democratic-Republican
- Spouse: Anne Yates
- Children: William Yates Gholson; Cary Ann Gholson who married Thomas Saunders Gholson; and Thomas Gholson, III
- Profession: lawyer, planter

Thomas Gholson Jr. (1780 – July 14, 1816) was an American lawyer and politician. He represented Virginia from 1808 to 1816 in the United States House of Representatives, after serving in the Virginia House of Delegates from 1806 to 1809.

== Early life and education ==
He was born in 1780, the son of Thomas Gholson and Jane Parry.

== Career ==
After reading law, he was admitted to the bar and began his legal practice in Brunswick County, Virginia. He served as member of the Virginia House of Delegates from 1806 to 1809. Gholson was elected as a Democratic-Republican to the Tenth Congress to fill the vacancy caused by the death of Dr. John Claiborne of Brunswick County. He was reelected to the Eleventh and to the three succeeding Congresses (November 7, 1808 – July 4, 1816), although due to the redistricting after the 1810 census, he was re-elected for the final two times from Virginia's 18th congressional district rather than Virginia's 17th congressional district (both congressional districts having by now become obsolete). During the War of 1812, the British invaded Washington, D.C. and Gholson became a volunteer aide on the staff of General Peter Buell Porter. Wounded, he recovered enough to remain in office and win re-election, although he would ultimately die from its effects two years later. During his final stint (in the Twelfth Congress), Gholson served as chairman of the Committee on Claims. Thomas M. Nelson, who captained Virginia infantry regiments during the War of 1812, succeeded to his congressional seat.

== Personal life ==
On July 28, 1806, Thomas Gholson Jr. married Anne Yates, the daughter of a former Virginia militiaman on General Washington's staff, and granddaughter of Rev. William Yates, the College of William & Mary's fifth president (1761–1764) and the namesake for Yates Hall on the college's campus; and a descendant of William Randolph, a colonist and land owner who played an important role in the history and government of the Commonwealth of Virginia.

Thomas and Ann were the parents of the following children: William Yates Gholson who married Martha Anne Jane Taylor on Christmas Day 1827; Cary Ann Gholson; and Thomas Gholson, III.

== Death and legacy ==
Thomas Gholson Jr. died on July 14, 1816 in Brunswick County, Virginia from the lingering effects of his war wound. After his death, his widow married as her second husband, George Washington Freeman, the second Episcopal bishop of Arkansas and Provisional Bishop of Texas. Their first born son, William Y. Gholson became a lawyer like his father and moved to Mississippi, where he developed strong anti-slavery views. He later freed his slaves, moved to Ohio because it did not permit slavery, then became the law partner of Salmon P. Chase and also active in the new Republican Party. He ran for a position on the Ohio Supreme Court and won in 1869, and served for four years before resigning and returning to his private legal practice in Cincinnati, Ohio. However his son Dr. Samuel Creed Gholson (1828-1910), educated in Virginia, enlisted in Mississippi forces, survived the war, and remained in Mississippi.

Congressman Gholson's nephews James Herbert Gholson and Thomas Saunders Gholson became lawyers and slaveholders and remained in Southside Virginia as well as speculated in Texas real estate. They also became politicians and local judges, although subject to complaints for partiality; Thomas Saunders Gholson married this Thomas' daughter and later became a member of the Second Confederate Congress. A second cousin was Richard D. Gholson, a Kentuckian who like the brothers Gholson invested in Texas and favored the Confederate cause.

Gholsonville, Virginia in Brunswick County is named in honor of this Gholson.

== See also ==
- List of members of the United States Congress who died in office (1790–1899)

U.S. House of Representatives
Preceded by John Claiborne	Member of the U.S. House of Representatives from Virginia's 17th congressional district 1808 – 1813	Succeeded by James Pleasants
Preceded by Peterson Goodwyn	Member of the U.S. House of Representatives from Virginia's 18th congressional district 1813 – 1816	Succeeded by Thomas M. Nelson
