= Charles H. Porter (Virginia politician) =

American politician

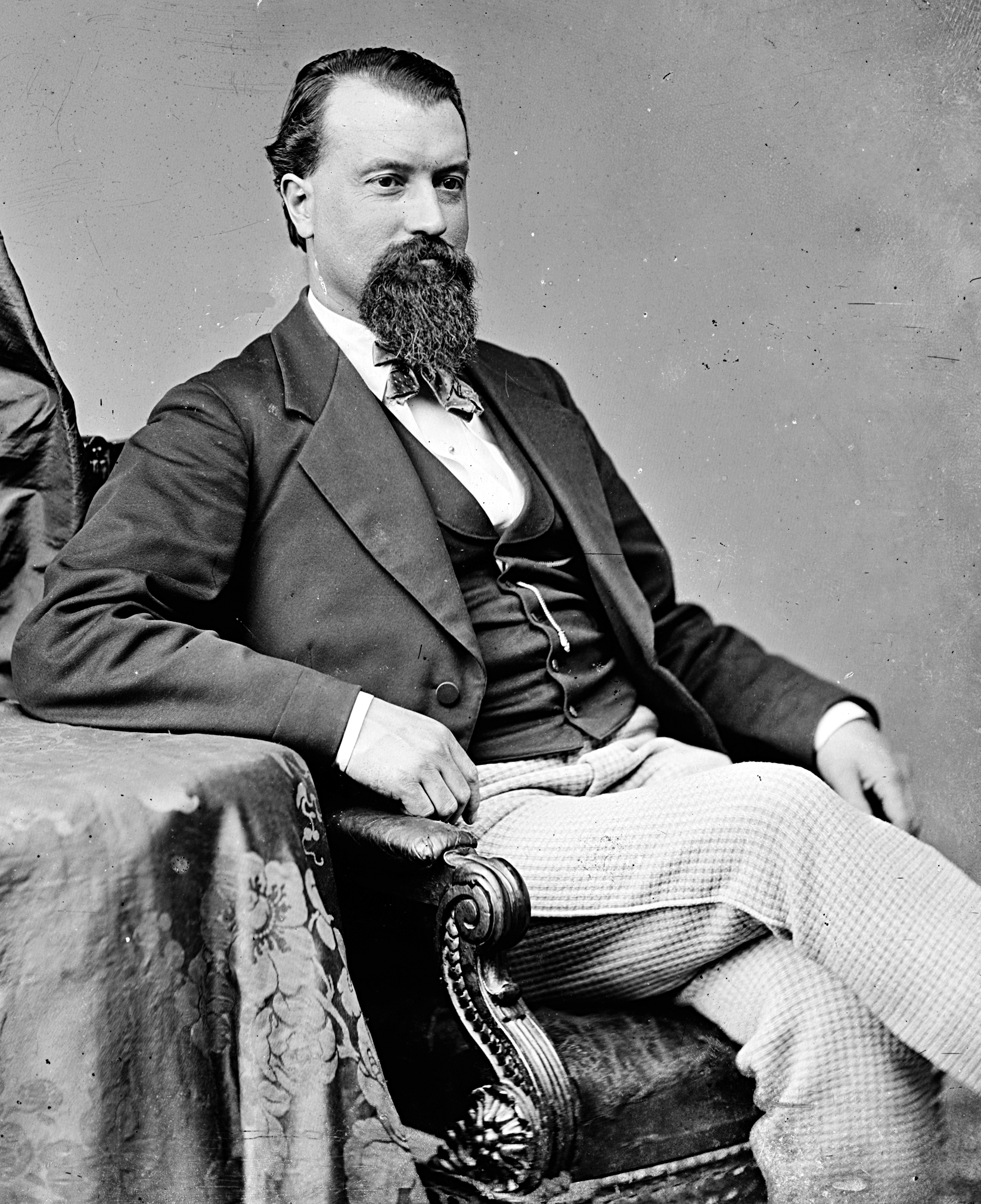

Member of the U.S. House of Representatives from Virginia's 3rd district
- In office January 26, 1870 – March 3, 1873
- Preceded by: Daniel C. DeJarnette (1861)
- Succeeded by: John A. Smith

Personal details
- Born: Charles Howell Porter; June 21, 1833 Cairo, New York
- Died: July 9, 1897 (aged 64) Cairo, New York
- Resting place: Cairo Cemetery, Cairo, New York
- Party: Republican
- Education: Albany Law School
- Profession: lawyer

Military service
- Allegiance: United States of America
- Branch/service: Union Army
- Unit: 1st Regiment New York Mounted Rifles
- Battles/wars: American Civil War

Charles Howell Porter (June 21, 1833 – July 9, 1897) was an attorney and politician who served as a U.S. representative from Virginia from 1870 to 1873.

Born and raised in Cairo, New York, he earned his law degree in Albany and set up a practice. in 1861, with the outbreak of the American Civil War, he joined a New York volunteer unit.

He settled in Norfolk, Virginia during the war and made his career there.

== Biography ==
Born in Cairo, New York, Porter completed preparatory studies. He was graduated from the law university at Albany, New York, in 1853. He was admitted to the bar in 1854 and commenced practice in Ashland, New York.

=== Civil War ===
He entered the Union Army in 1861 as a member of the 1st Regiment New York Mounted Rifles.

He settled in Norfolk, Virginia during the war.

=== Early career ===
He served as city attorney for one year, and as Commonwealth attorney from 1863–1867. He moved to the state capital, Richmond, in 1867.

He served as member of the Virginia Constitutional Convention of 1868.

=== Congress ===
Upon the readmission of Virginia to the US, Porter was elected as a Republican to the Forty-first and Forty-second Congresses, serving from January 26, 1870, to March 3, 1873.

He declined to be a candidate for renomination in 1872 and re-engaged in the practice of law in New York City and Beacon, New York.

=== Death and burial ===
He died in Cairo, New York, July 9, 1897. He was interred in Cairo Cemetery.

== Electoral history ==
- 1869; Porter was elected to the U.S. House of Representatives with 77.16% of the vote, defeating Independents James W. Hunnicutt and John E. Mulford.
- 1870; Porter was re-elected unopposed.

U.S. House of Representatives
Preceded by Daniel C. DeJarnette (1861)	Member of the U.S. House of Representatives from Virginia's 3rd congressional district 1870–1873	Succeeded by John A. Smith
