= Alfred W. Harris =

American politician

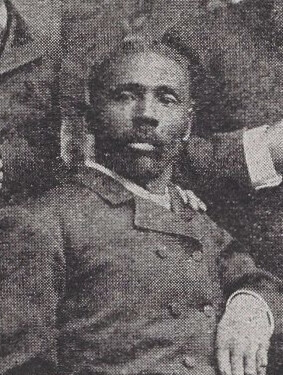

Member of the Virginia House of Delegates for Dinwiddie County
- In office December 7, 1881 – December 3, 1889
- Preceded by: E.H. Smith
- Succeeded by: L.E. Coleman

Personal details
- Born: 1854 Fairfax County, Virginia
- Died: March 24, 1920 (aged 65–66) Petersburg County, Virginia
- Resting place: Blandford Cemetery
- Spouse: Ida
- Children: 5 sons and 2 daughters
- Parent(s): Henry and Jemima
- Education: Howard University Law School
- Occupation: attorney, politician, farmer

Alfred W. Harris (1854-March 24, 1920) was an American lawyer and legislator in Virginia who represented Dinwiddie County in the Virginia House of Delegates from 1881 until 1888.

== Early life ==
Harris was born free in Fairfax County, Virginia, in 1854, the son of Jemima and Henry Harris, whose very large family in Fairfax and neighboring Prince William counties had been free as early as 1776. He attended public schools in Alexandria, Virginia. He read law privately with George W. Mitchell, a Black lawyer, then enrolled in the Howard University Law School in Washington, D.C. and graduated in 1881.

His father had died by 1870, when Harris worked as a laborer and lived with his 55 year old mother Jemima, 23 and 9 year old sisters, 15 year old brother and two other people in Alexandria. A decade later, the census already characterized Harris as a lawyer (and his brother as a medical student), although their youngest sister no longer lived with the family and their household included two adopted siblings.

== Career ==
While in Alexandria, Harris edited the Summer Tribune and in April 1876 joined the editorial staff of the People’s Advocate. Despite being admitted to the Virginia bar in Alexandria in 1880, after graduating from Howard's law school, Harris moved to Dinwiddie County outside Petersburg, Virginia, where he operated a farm of 12.5 acres as well as began a private legal practice. He became associated with the Readjuster Party, which held power in Petersburg. Voters in Petersburg and surrounding Dinwiddie County elected and re-elected Harris to represent them in the Virginia House of Delegates during the Reconstruction era. Harris became known as the best debater among the Black delegates in the Virginia General Assembly of his day. As a legislator, Harris in particular pushed for the creation of Virginia Normal and Collegiate Institute (now Virginia State University).

== Personal and family life ==
In Alexandria on December 31, 1884, Harris married Ida R. Morris of nearby Prince William County, who would bear several children as well as survive him. In the 1900 census, while Harris was again characterized as a lawyer, she was listed as a schoolteacher, and their household included five sons and 2 daughters. In the 1910 census, the couple continued to live in Dinwiddie County with their 23 year old son (Alfred W. Harris Jr.) as well as their 17 year old daughter Alfreda, and younger sons Christopher (15), Franklin(12) and Clarence (10 years old).

== Death and legacy ==
Harris died in Petersburg on March 24, 1920, of arteriosclerosis complicated by a stroke. Alumni and staff of that college erected a gravestone at historic Blandford Cemetery to mark his legislative service.

== See also ==
- African American officeholders from the end of the Civil War until before 1900
