= Blandford Church =

Historic church in Virginia, US

- U.S. National Register of Historic Places
- Virginia Landmarks Register
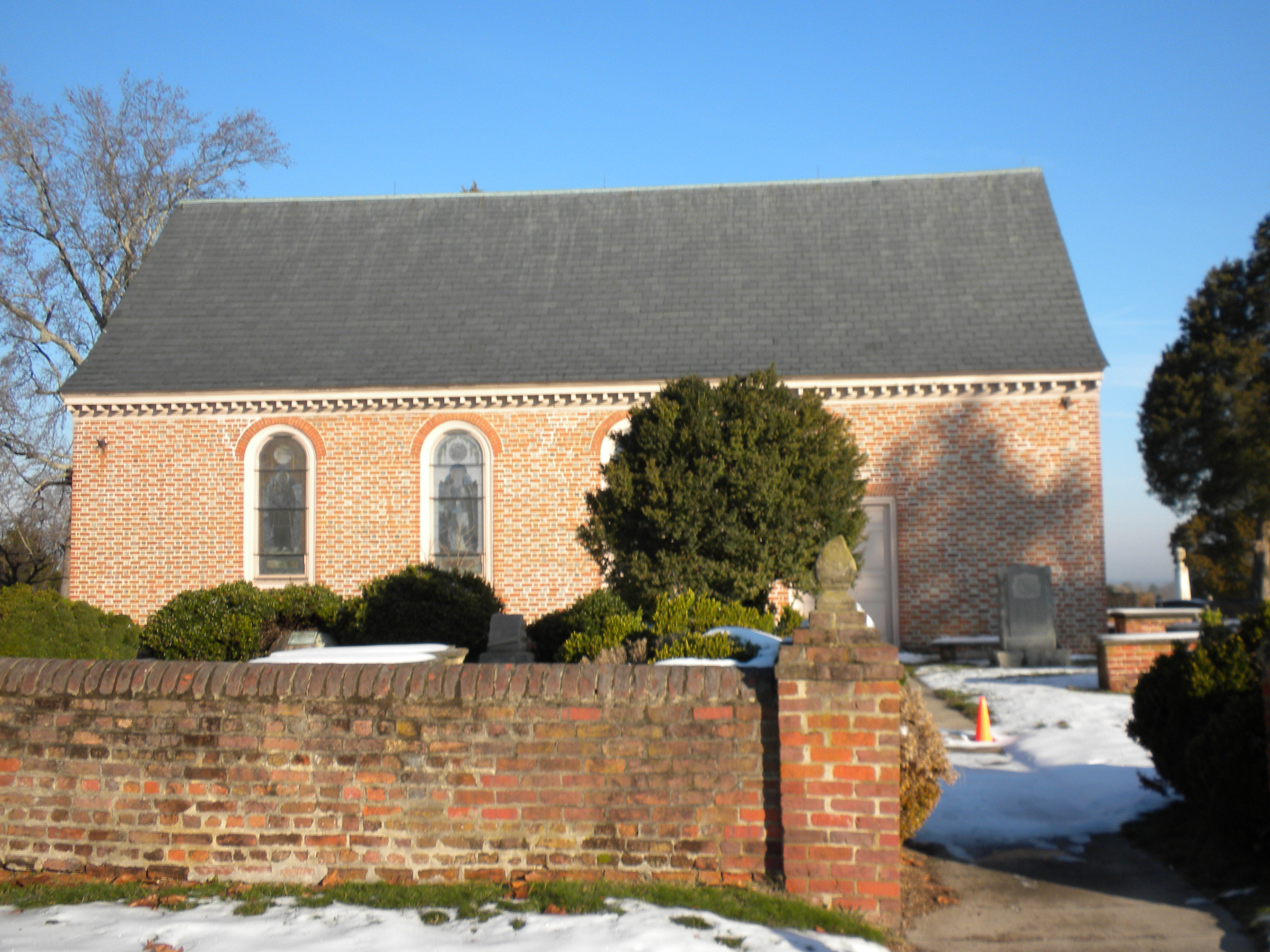
- The church as it looks today.

- Location within Virginia Location within the United States
- Location: 319 S. Crater Rd., Petersburg, Virginia
- Coordinates: 37°13′33″N 77°23′16″W
- Area: 9 acres (3.6 ha)
- Built: 1736
- NRHP reference No.: 72001513
- VLR No.: 123-0039

Significant dates
- Added to NRHP: May 31, 1972
- Designated VLR: April 18, 1972

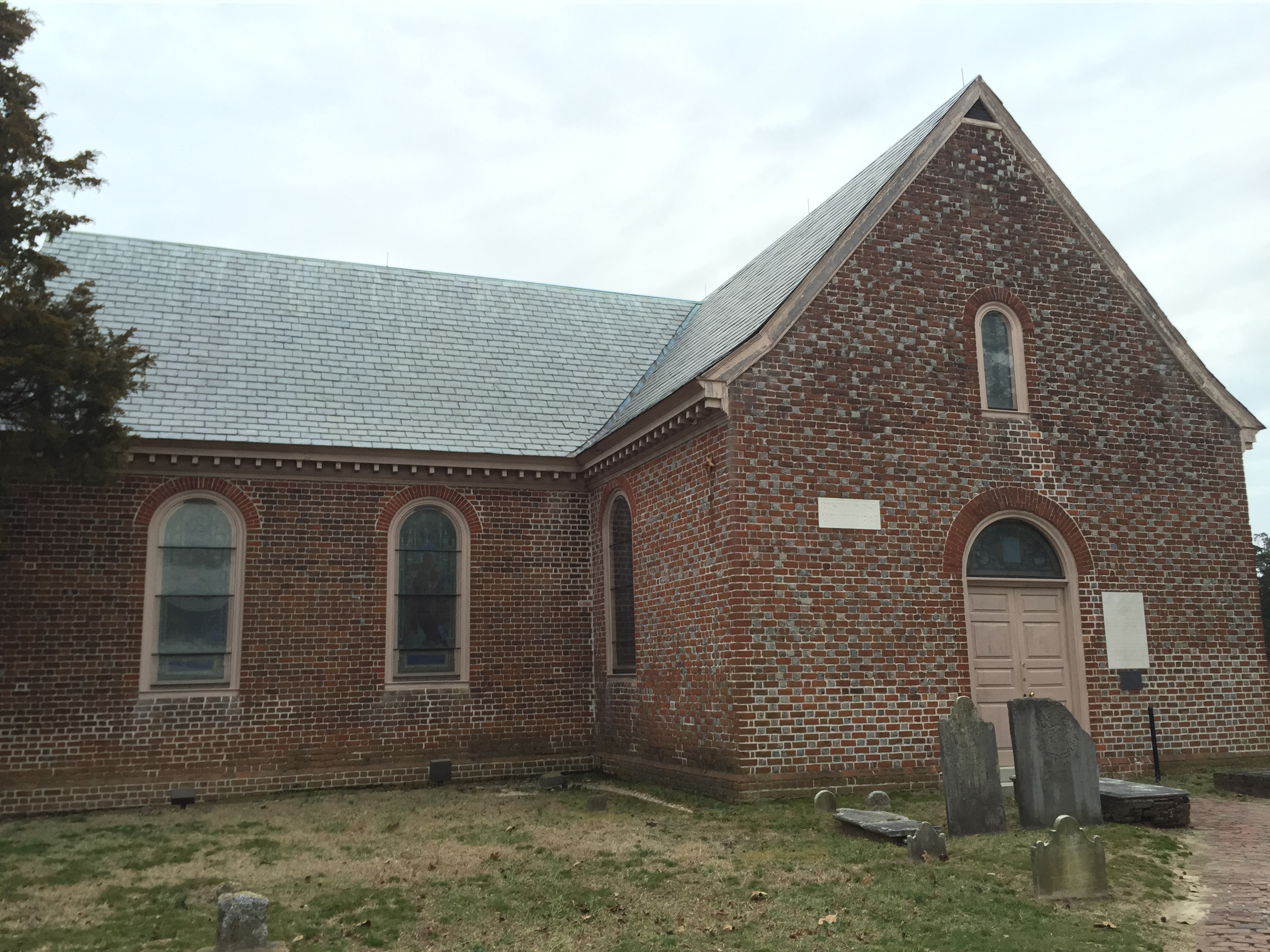
Old Blandford Church Petersburg Virginia - panoramio

The Blandford Church is the oldest building in Petersburg, Virginia whose history is well documented. It is at the highest point in the city, atop Well's Hill. It is today (2019) part of a memorial to Southern soldiers who died during the Civil War. It is adjacent to Blandford Cemetery, one of the oldest, largest and historically significant cemeteries in Virginia. The Blandford Cemetery did not exist until after the church building had been abandoned, in the early 1800s, and the land purchased by the city to use as a cemetery.

The Blandford Church, also known as St. Paul's Church or simply "The Brick Church", was erected in 1736 on Well's Hill, the highest point in Petersburg. In 1781, during the American Revolution, the Battle of Blandford, also known as the Battle of Petersburg, was fought nearby. Following the battle Major General William Phillips was ordered back to Petersburg to meet Lord Cornwallis who was moving north From Wilmington, North Carolina. While in Petersburg awaiting the arrival of Cornwallis, Phillips fell ill and died on 13 May 1781. He was secretly buried somewhere in the churchyard.

The church building was abandoned in 1806 after the construction of another Episcopal church in Petersburg when the Town of Blandford in Prince George County was absorbed by Petersburg. It became "an ivy-clad picturesque shell."

During the Civil War the church served as a major telegraph station. It was used as a field hospital, most notably after the Battle of the Crater on July 30, 1864.

Necessary repairs for its preservation were made by the City of Petersburg in 1882. A Ladies' Memorial Association of Petersburg was founded in 1866 and took on preserving the former church as a memorial to the large number of Confederate soldiers buried in the adjacent cemetery. (Some 30,000 were buried unidentified in mass graves.) It is one of the oldest non-religious women's organizations in the country. Between 1889 and 1905, the Ladies Memorial Association paid for a pulpit and 34 pews. The windows were restored temporarily with clear glass.

The Ladies Memorial Association requested from the eleven Confederate states, plus the slave states of Maryland and Missouri, funds to commission stained-glass windows. (Only Kentucky declined.) Between 1904 and 1912, windows were created and installed by Louis Comfort Tiffany. Each of the large windows contains the image of a Saint, and symbols associated with that Saint. In addition to the thirteen state windows, Tiffany donated one, as did the Ladies Memorial Association.

The stained glass half-round window over the church door contains the name Ladies Memorial Association of Petersburgh, VA, the dates 1866–1909, and in the center, the only Confederate flag Tiffany is known to have made, together with the dates 1861—1865. As the city's Web site puts it, it is a shrine to its 'Lost Cause.'"

== History ==
At their meeting on November 18, 1900, the Ladies' Memorial Association decided to ask permission to make "Old Blandford Church" into a "mortuary and memorial chapel. " Fifteen windows were installed between 1904 and 1912. Most display a state seal, the figure of a saint, and an inscription. Eleven were donated by each of the former Confederate states: North Carolina, South Carolina, Virginia, Mississippi, Alabama, Florida, Texas, Georgia, Louisiana, Tennessee, and Arkansas. Two were donated by Missouri and Maryland. Kentucky, another border state, was the only state that refused to participate. In addition, there is a window of a Christian cross of jewels donated by Louis Comfort Tiffany.

It was listed on the National Register of Historic Places in 1972.

== Confederate state windows and representative saints ==
- Saint John the Evangelist- Virginia
- Saint Paul- Louisiana: The Washington Artillery funded the Louisiana window. It is the only state window that doesn't include a state seal. Instead, it features the insignia of the Washington Artillery.
- Saint Bartholomew- North Carolina
- Saint Philip the Apostle- Tennessee
- Saint James the Less- Mississippi
- Saint Luke- Texas
- Saint Peter- Missouri
- Saint Mark- South Carolina
- Saint Andrew- Alabama
- Saint Thomas the Apostle- Georgia
- Saint Matthew- Florida
