= James Seddon =

American lawyer and politician

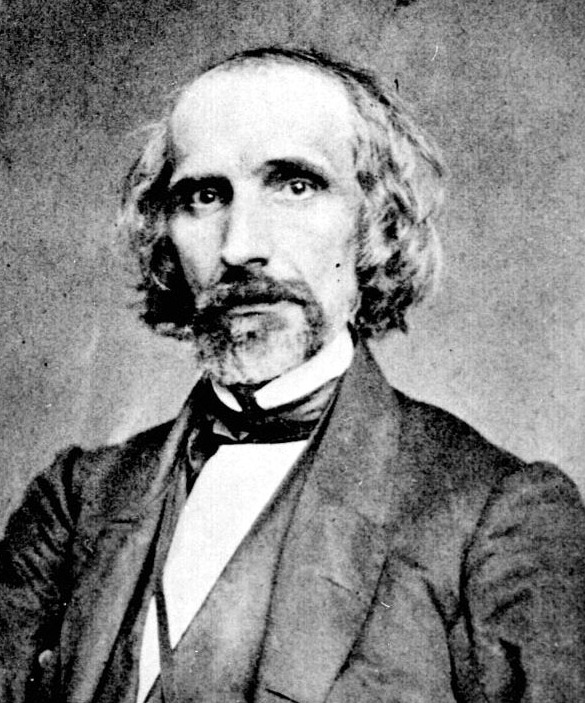

4th Confederate States Secretary of War
- In office November 21, 1862 – February 5, 1865
- President: Jefferson Davis
- Preceded by: George Randolph
- Succeeded by: John Breckinridge

Member of the U.S. House of Representatives from Virginia's 6th district
- In office March 4, 1849 – March 3, 1851
- Preceded by: John Botts
- Succeeded by: John Caskie
- In office March 4, 1845 – March 3, 1847
- Preceded by: John Jones
- Succeeded by: John Botts

Personal details
- Born: James Alexander Seddon; July 13, 1815 Falmouth, Virginia, US
- Died: August 19, 1880 (aged 65) Goochland County, Virginia, US
- Party: Democratic
- Spouse: Sarah Bruce
- Education: University of Virginia

James Alexander Seddon (July 13, 1815 – August 19, 1880) was an American lawyer and politician who served two terms as a representative in the United States Congress, as a member of the Democratic Party. Seddon was appointed Confederate States Secretary of War by Jefferson Davis during the American Civil War.

== Life and career ==
Due to frail health, Seddon was educated primarily at home and became self-taught as a youth. At the age of twenty-one, he entered the University of Virginia School of Law. After graduation, Seddon settled in Richmond, Virginia, establishing a successful law practice. Seddon married Sarah Bruce on December 23, 1845, in Richmond, Virginia.

In 1845, the Democratic Party nominated Seddon for Congress, and he was easily elected. He was renominated two years later but declined due to platform differences with the party. In 1849, Seddon was reelected to Congress, serving from December 1849 until March 1851. Owing to poor health, he declined another nomination at the end of his term. He retired to "Sabot Hill," his plantation located along the James River above Richmond.

Seddon attended the Peace Conference of 1861 held in Washington, D.C., which attempted to devise a means of preventing the impending civil war. Later in the same year, he attended the Provisional Congress of the Confederate States. President Davis named him his fourth Secretary of War, succeeding George W. Randolph. He held this post until January 1, 1865, when he retired from public life to his plantation and was succeeded by John C. Breckinridge. His service of more than twenty-four months as Secretary made him the most durable of the five secretaries.

James Seddon was a strong advocate of secession and served as Confederate secretary of war from November 1862 until his resignation in January 1865.

Upon assuming office in November 1862, Seddon inherited a conscription system established by the April 1862 act, which drafted white males aged 18 to 35, but he directed its rigorous enforcement through the Conscription Bureau to address acute manpower shortages.

In the wake of the Richmond Bread Riot—instigated by a mob of hungry women on the streets of the Confederate capital on April 2, 1863. The New York Times ran a front-page article on April 8, 1863, under the headline: "Bread Riot in Richmond. Three Thousand Hungry Women Raging in the Streets..."

In May 1863, President Jefferson Davis and Secretary of War James Seddon suggested to General Lee that he detach significant forces, to relieve the pressure on Vicksburg, Mississippi, but Robert E Lee objected and began his invasion into Pennsylvania that brought him to Gettysburg and defeat.

After the Confederacy lost the war, Seddon was arrested by Union forces in May 1865, served seven months in prison at Fort Pulaski facing potential charges for mistreating Union prisoners. President Johnson ordered the charges dropped. Mr. Seddon retired from public life and died in Goochland County, Virginia, on August 19, 1880. He is buried at Hollywood Cemetery in Richmond, Virginia.

== Electoral history ==
- 1845; Seddon was elected to the U.S. House of Representatives with 52.28% of the vote, defeating Whig John Minor Botts.
- 1849; Seddon was reelected with 53.64% of the vote, defeating Whig challenger Botts.

U.S. House of Representatives
Preceded by John Jones	Member of the U.S. House of Representatives from Virginia's 6th congressional district 1845–1847	Succeeded by John Botts
Preceded by John Botts	Member of the U.S. House of Representatives from Virginia's 6th congressional district 1849–1851	Succeeded by John Caskie
Political offices
Preceded by George Randolph	Confederate States Secretary of War; 1862–1865	Succeeded by John Breckinridge
