= People's Memorial Cemetery =

Historic cemetery in Petersburg, Virginia

- U.S. National Register of Historic Places
- Virginia Landmarks Register
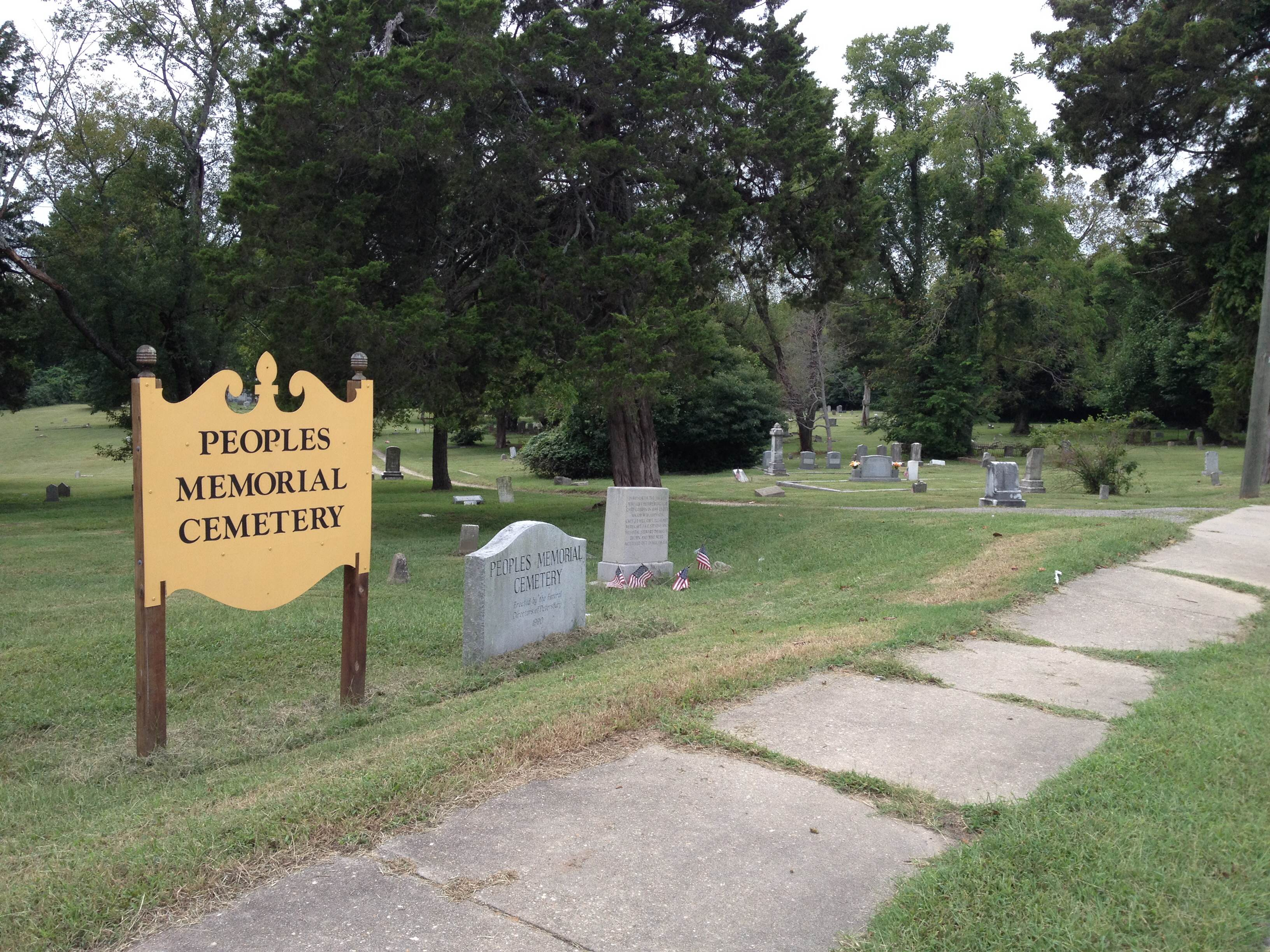

- Location within Virginia Location within the United States
- Location: 334 S. Crater Rd., Petersburg, Virginia
- Coordinates: 37°13′30″N 77°23′20″W
- Area: 8.2 acres (3.3 ha)
- Built: 1840
- MPS: African-American Cemeteries in Petersburg, Virginia MPS
- NRHP reference No.: 08000245
- VLR No.: 123-5031-0001

Significant dates
- Added to NRHP: March 28, 2008
- Designated VLR: December 5, 2007

People's Memorial Cemetery, formerly known as Providence Cemetery, is a historic African-American cemetery located at Petersburg, Virginia. The cemetery was deeded in three sections: the first tract in 1840, the second tract was added in 1865, and the final acres were deeded about 1880. The cemetery reflects the organization of "free persons of color" and is evidence of the evolution of the entrepreneurial efforts of African-American undertakers and stonecutters; the activities of mutual aid societies; and the community's social, religious, and artistic values from 1840 to 1942.

It was listed on the National Register of Historic Places in 2008.

The cemetery is located adjacent to the Blandford Cemetery and portions of the grounds were part of the Negro Burying Ground, a cemetery for slaves that died during the War of 1812.
