= Spring Grove (Oak Corner, Virginia) =

Historic house in Virginia, United States

- U.S. National Register of Historic Places
- Virginia Landmarks Register
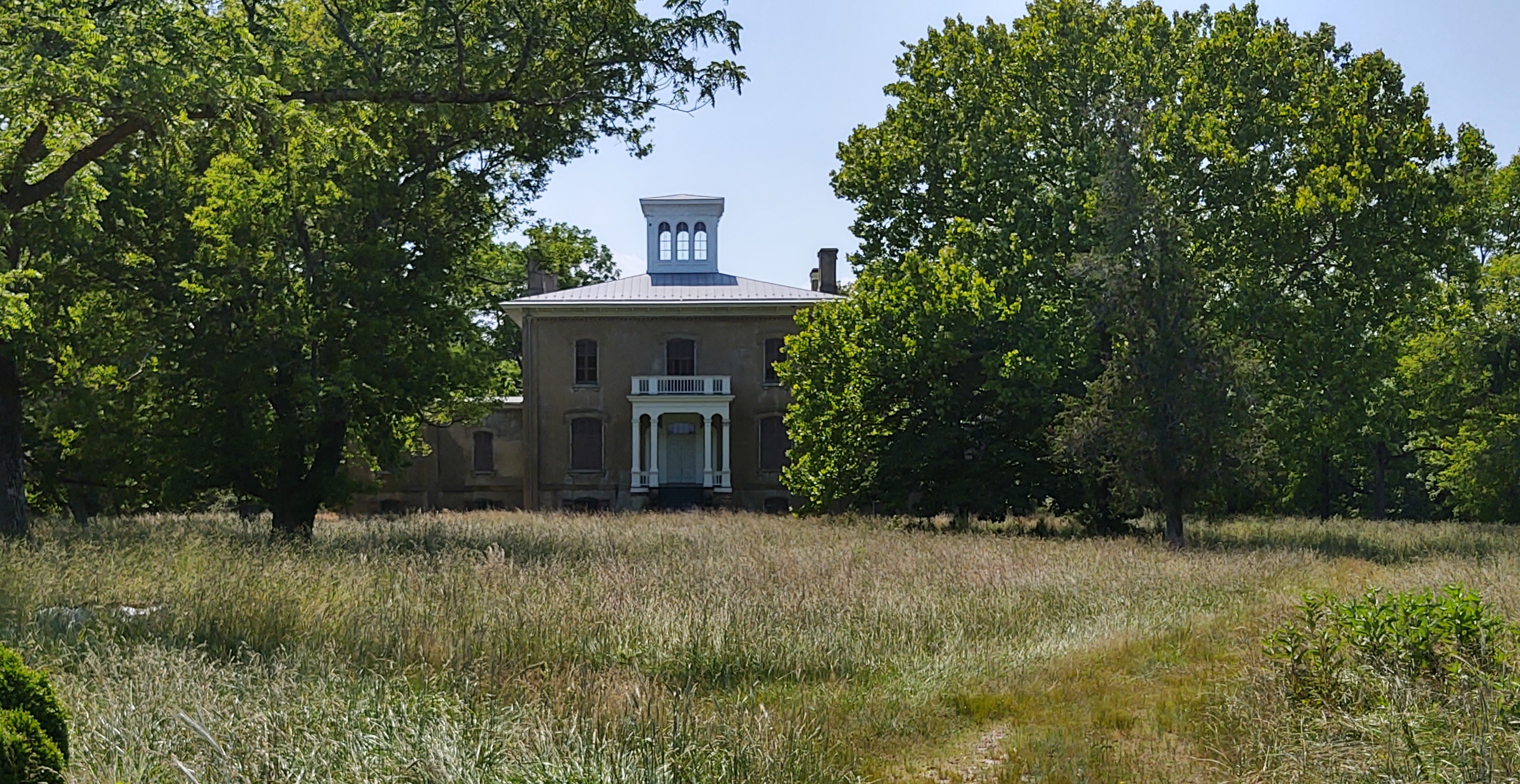
- Spring Grove house

- Location within Virginia Location within the United States
- Nearest city: Oak Corner, Virginia
- Coordinates: 37.97809°N 77.33196°W
- Area: 530 acres (210 ha)
- Built: 1856
- Architectural style: Italianate
- NRHP reference No.: 76002097
- VLR No.: 016-0025

Significant dates
- Added to NRHP: December 12, 1976
- Designated VLR: September 21, 1976

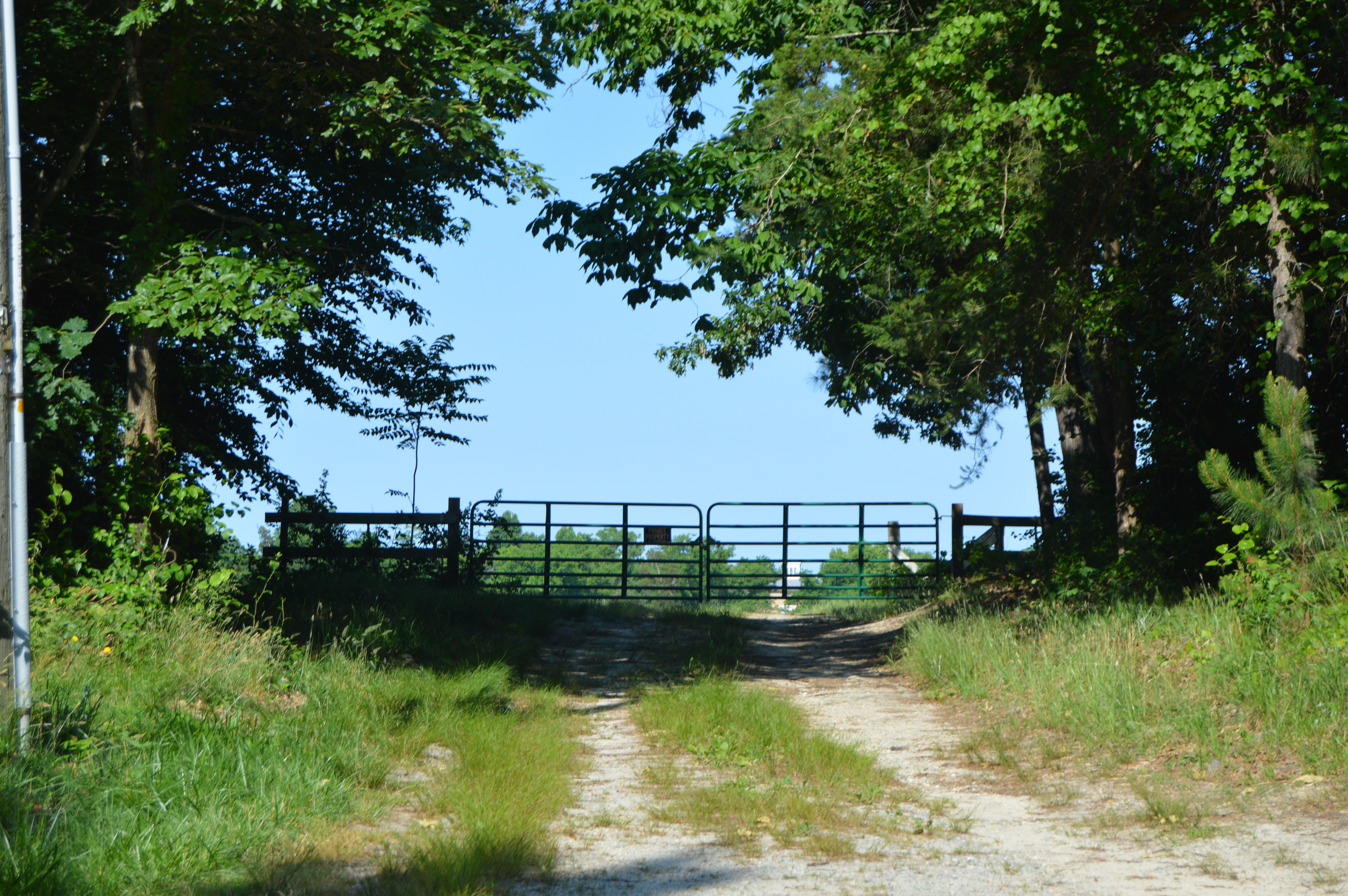
Property entrance

Spring Grove is a historic home located at Oak Corner, Caroline County, Virginia. It was built in 1856, and is an Italian Villa style dwelling built for Daniel Coleman DeJarnette, Sr. (1822–1881) on a plantation that had been owned by the DeJarnette family, French Huguenot immigrants to Virginia, since 1740. The 26 room, 12,000 square foot mansion is the third house to occupy the site.

It was listed on the National Register of Historic Places in 1976.
