= William Y. Gholson =

American judge (1807–1870)

William Yates Gholson
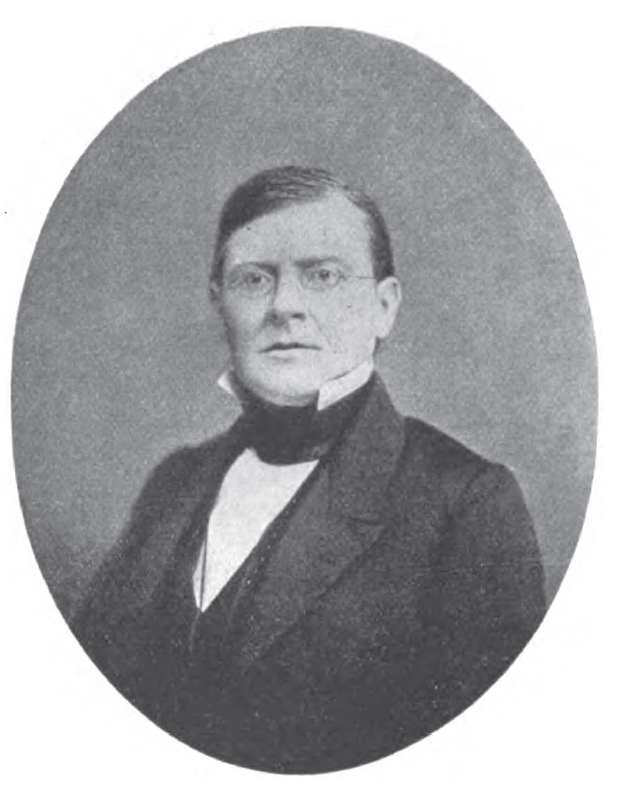

Justice of the Ohio Supreme Court
- In office November 8, 1859 – December 1, 1863
- Preceded by: Joseph Rockwell Swan
- Succeeded by: Horace Wilder

Personal details
- Born: December 25, 1807 Southampton County, Virginia, U.S.
- Died: September 21, 1870 (aged 62) Cincinnati, Ohio, U.S.
- Resting place: Spring Grove Cemetery
- Party: Republican
- Spouses: Martha Anne Jane Taylor; Elvira Wright
- Children: four
- Education: Princeton University

William Yates Gholson (December 25, 1807 – September 21, 1870) was a Republican politician in the U.S. State of Ohio who was an Ohio Supreme Court judge from 1859 to 1863.

== Early life and education ==
William Yates Gholson was born at his father's plantation on Christmas Day in 1807 in Southampton County, Virginia. His father was Thomas Gholson, a member of the United States House of Representatives from 1808 to 1816.

Gholson studied with judge Creed Taylor at his proprietary Virginia law school, then moved to Princeton, New Jersey and graduated from Princeton University and its law school in 1825.

Gholson married Martha Anne Jane Taylor in Virginia, who had two children and died in 1831. He married Elvira Wright in 1839, who also had two children.

== Career ==
Gholson soon moved to Mississippi and established a legal practice. He also helped found the University of Mississippi and was an original member of its board of trustees. Seeing the growing internal slave trade as cotton and other plantations were established in Mississippi following the invention and widespread adoption of the cotton gin, Gholson developed strong anti-slavery views.

This caused Gholson to move to Cincinnati, Ohio. There, he formed a law practice with James P. Holcombe and Salmon P. Chase. In 1854, Gholson was elected Judge of the Superior Court in Cincinnati.

In 1859, he was nominated by the State Republican Convention for the State Supreme Court, and defeated Democrat Henry C. Whitman. Because one existing judge resigned immediately after the election, Gholson was appointed to fill the term in November of that year. He resigned his seat late in 1863, and was replaced by Horace Wilder. He returned to Cincinnati, resumed law practice, and authored several books about legal topics.

== Death and legacy ==
Gholson died September 21, 1870, in Cincinnati. He was buried at Spring Grove Cemetery.

== Notes ==
Legal offices
Preceded by Joseph Rockwell Swan	Associate Justice of the Ohio Supreme Court; 1859–1863	Succeeded by Horace Wilder
