= Daniel Coleman DeJarnette Sr. =

American politician

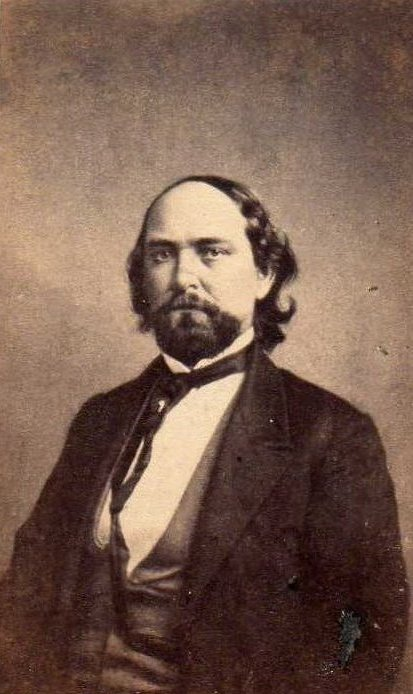

Member of the Confederate House of Representatives from Virginia's 8th congressional district
- In office February 18, 1862 – March 18, 1865
- Preceded by: Position created
- Succeeded by: Position abolished

Member of the U.S. House of Representatives from Virginia's 3rd district
- In office March 4, 1859 – March 3, 1861
- Preceded by: John Caskie
- Succeeded by: Charles H. Porter (1870)

Member of the Virginia House of Delegates
- In office 1853–1858
- Preceded by: William A Buckner
- Succeeded by: George Tyler

Personal details
- Born: October 18, 1822 Spring Grove Manor, Caroline County, Virginia
- Died: August 20, 1881 (aged 58) White Sulphur Springs, West Virginia
- Resting place: Spring Grove Manor, Caroline County, Virginia
- Party: Independent Democrat
- Education: Bethany College

Daniel Coleman DeJarnette Sr. (October 18, 1822 – August 20, 1881) was a Virginia politician, serving in the United States Congress and then in the Confederate Congress during the American Civil War.

== Early and family life ==
DeJarnette was born in Caroline County, Virginia. The DeJarnettes were descended from French Huguenot immigrants who settled in Virginia during the colonial period and had been prominent Virginia planters for generations. His grandfather Joseph DeJarnette had founded the Spring Grove plantation which would be this man's home all his life in 1740, with the main house about a half mile east of the modern Mattaponi River Bridge (Route 301). In addition to operating a plantation using enslaved labor (as would his son and this man), Joseph DeJarnette served as a local road overseer and debt collector/bail bondsman (as was John Woolfolk), and came to own about 5000 acres between the Mattaponi River and Maracossic Creek. His father and grandfather had built a grist mill on Maracossic Creek (that later was known as Smoot's mill after it left family ownership). His father's brothers had left Caroline County, as had their sisters (this man's aunts).

DeJarnette received a private education suitable for his class. His family had been prominent dissenters for generations in Caroline County, initially allied with the Methodist Church. He traveled to what in his lifetime became West Virginia for higher education at the then-new Bethany College, founded by Rev. Alexander Campbell and chartered by Virginia's legislature in 1840.

== Career ==
Like his father and grandfather, DeJarnette operated his plantation using enslaved labor. In 1840, he owned 100 slaves in Caroline County. A decade later, he owned 104 slaves. In the last federal census of slaveholdings, in 1860, DeJarnette owned 32 enslaved people. The decline in his slaveholdings may be due to his financial needs after tearing down the old mansion house at Spring Grove, and building the current (and now historic) mansion, in the Italianate style popular immediately before the American Civil War.

Caroline County voters elected DeJarnette as their representative (part time) in the Virginia House of Delegates in 1853 and re-elected him twice, so he served through 1858. He resigned after winning as an Independent Democrat (or with anti-Administration views) to the United States House of Representatives, with 50.45% of the vote. He defeated Democrat John Caskie, and served from 1859 to 1861, the outbreak of the American Civil War.

DeJarnette represented Virginia in both the First Confederate Congress and the Second Confederate Congress (February 1862-March 1865). His eldest son, Elliott DeJarnette enlisted in the Confederate States Army and survived the conflict.

In 1872 Governor Gilbert Carlton Walker appointed DeJarnette to the Board of Visitors of the newly established Virginia Agricultural and Mechanical College (now Virginia Tech).

== Personal life ==
DeJarnette married a cousin, Louise Jane DeJarnette, the daughter of Elliott DeJarnette. They had at least three sons and three daughters. Their firstborn son Elliott DeJarnette (1846-1898), became a Confederate Army officer and his grandson Edmund Tompkins DeJarnette decades later served in the Virginia House of Delegates, representing nearby Hanover and King William Counties.

== Death and legacy ==
DeJarnette died at White Sulfur Springs, West Virginia in 1881, and his remains were returned to Caroline County for interment.

His home, Spring Grove, then owned by his great-grandson, was listed on the National Register of Historic Places in 1976. Complicating matters, another historic home with the same name operates as a bed and breakfast considerably to the west near Appommattox, Virginia.

Confederate States House of Representatives
Preceded by Position created	Member of the Confederate House of Representatives from Virginia's 8th Congressional District; 1862–1865	Succeeded by Position abolished
U.S. House of Representatives
Preceded by John Caskie	Member of the U.S. House of Representatives from Virginia's 3rd congressional district 1859–1861	Succeeded by Charles H. Porter (1870)
