= William Roy Smith (politician) =

American politician (1920–1993)

Member of the Virginia House of Delegates from the Petersburg, Prince George and Dinwiddie counties district
- In office 1952–1973

Personal details
- Born: July 8, 1920 Petersburg, Virginia, U.S.
- Died: September 17, 1993 (aged 73) Petersburg, Virginia, U.S.
- Resting place: Blandford Cemetery; Petersburg, Virginia, U.S.
- Party: Democratic
- Spouse: Virginia Lee Brown
- Children: 3
- Education: Medical College of Virginia (BS)
- Occupation: Politician; pharmacist; auto dealer

William Roy Smith (July 8, 1920 – September 17, 1993) was an American politician from Virginia. He served as a member of the Virginia House of Delegates from 1951 to 1973.

== Early life ==
William Roy Smith was born on July 8, 1920, in Petersburg, Virginia. His father was a pharmacist. He graduated from the Medical College of Virginia's School of Pharmacy with a bachelor's degree in 1941.

== Career ==
In 1947, Smith's father helped him start his own pharmaceutical firm, Physicians Products Company Inc. In 1963, he sold the firm to International Latex Corporation and it was merged with a Pennsylvania-based subsidiary. He was chief executive officer of the firm until the late 1960s. He was president of the Virginia Pharmaceutical Association and was a member of the American Pharmaceutical Association. In the late 1960s, Smith briefly owned the Triangle Dodge auto dealership and was executive secretary of the Virginia Pharmaceutical Association. In 1969, he joined A. H. Robins Company as a new products planning director. In 1973, he became vice president. He was senior vice president and became general manager of the pharmaceutical division in 1976 and later retired in January 1982.

Smith was a Democrat. He was a member of the Virginia House of Delegates, representing Petersburg, Prince George and Dinwiddie counties, from 1952 to 1973. He was chairman of the appropriations committee. He was a co-sponsor of legislation leading to the construction of the Richmond–Petersburg Turnpike. After serving as a delegate, he was a member of the Coalition, a group of independent and Democratic conservative politicians. The Coalition supported Mills Godwin, John N. Dalton and Chuck Robb for Virginia governor. In 1982, Smith and Godwin were co-chairmen of a steering committee for Paul S. Trible Jr.'s senate bid.

Smith was appointed to the board of visitors of the Virginia Commonwealth University in 1981. He was vice rector for three years and was rector of the board of visitors from 1984 to 1986. He was president of the Medical College of Virginia Alumni Association and the Petersburg Lions Club. He was a founder of what was later named the Southside Virginia Emergency Crew. He was a member of the Southside Virginia Emergency Crew Advisory Board and Petersburg Advisory Board of First & Merchants Bank.

== Personal life ==
Smith married Virginia Lee Brown. They had two sons and a daughter, Robert Worthington Nunnally, Robert Blackwell II and Virginia Lee. He was a member and vestryman of St. Paul's Episcopal Church in Petersburg.

Smith died of cancer on September 17, 1993, at his home in Petersburg. He was buried in Blandford Cemetery in Petersburg.

== Awards ==
In 1949, Smith received the Distinguished Service Award by the Petersburg Jaycees. In 1965, Smith was named Pharmacist of the Year by the Virginia Pharmaceutical Association.
