= George Dromgoole =

American politician

George Coke Dromgoole
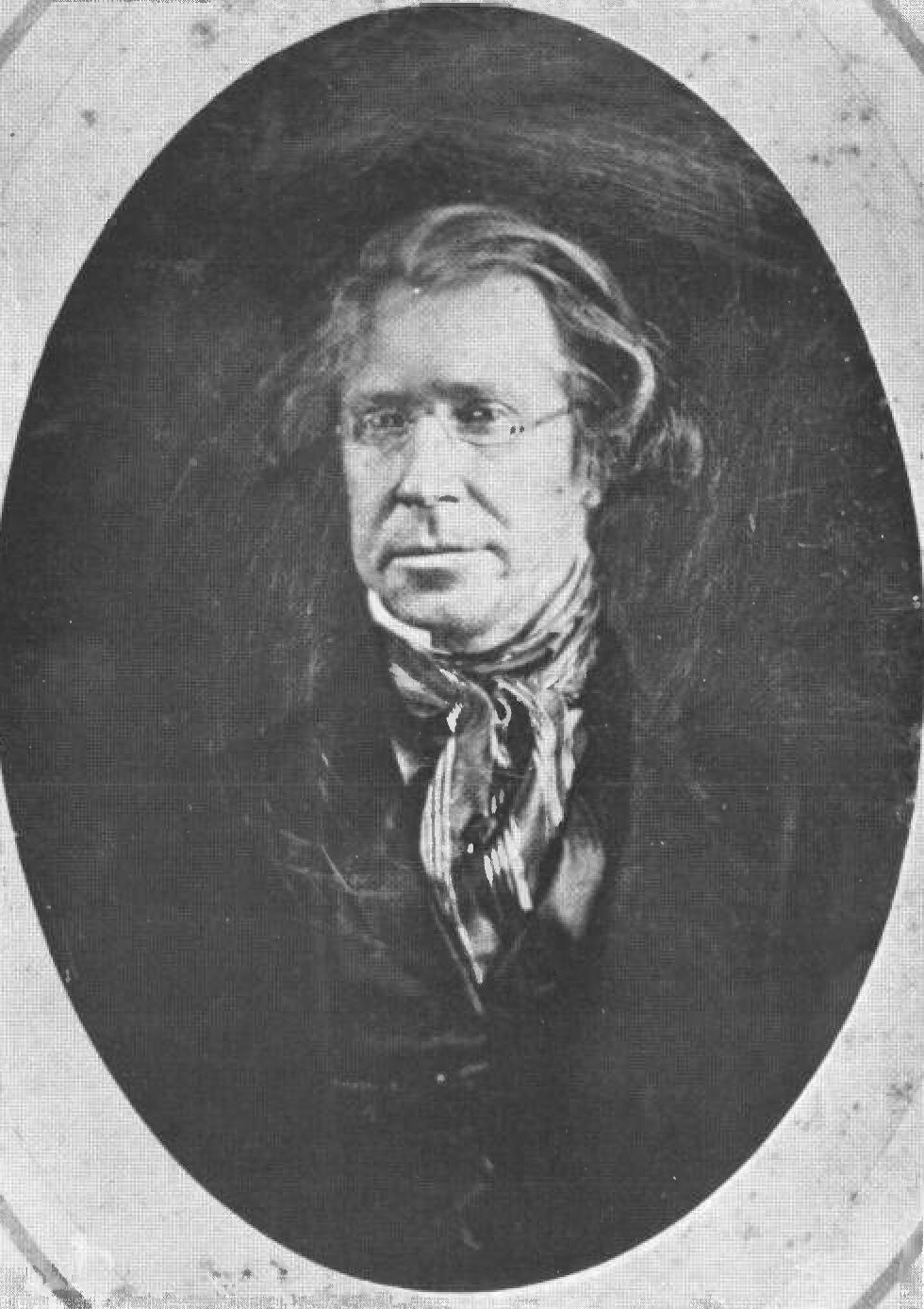

Member of the U.S. House of Representatives from Virginia's 2nd district
- In office March 4, 1843 – April 27, 1847
- Preceded by: George B. Cary
- Succeeded by: Richard K. Meade

Member of the U.S. House of Representatives from Virginia's 4th district
- In office March 4, 1835 – March 3, 1841
- Preceded by: James Gholson
- Succeeded by: William O. Goode

Member of the Virginia Senate from Brunswick, Dinwiddie and Greensville Counties
- In office 1832–1834
- Preceded by: Himself
- Succeeded by: Richard K. Meade
- In office 1830
- Preceded by: District established
- Succeeded by: Himself

Member of the Virginia Senate from Brunswick, Dinwiddie, Lunenburg and Mecklenburg Counties
- In office 1826–1829
- Preceded by: Burwell Goodwyn
- Succeeded by: District abolished

Speaker of the Virginia Senate
- In office 1832–1834
- Preceded by: William Holt
- Succeeded by: Stafford Parker

Member of the Virginia House of Delegates from Brunswick County
- In office 1823–1825; Alongside Jesse Read, James Gholson

Personal details
- Born: May 15, 1797 Lawrenceville, Virginia
- Died: April 27, 1847 (aged 49) Brunswick County, Virginia
- Resting place: Family cemetery south of the Meherrin River
- Party: Democratic (after 1837)
- Other political affiliations: Jacksonian (before 1837)
- Occupation: lawyer

General George Coke Dromgoole (May 15, 1797 – April 27, 1847) (nicknamed the "Brunswick Lion") was a nineteenth-century Virginia lawyer, military officer, planter and politician who served in both houses of the Virginia General Assembly representing his native Brunswick County as well as the U.S. House of Representatives representing first Virginia's 4th congressional district, then Virginia's 2nd congressional district. The youngest son of Irish-born pioneer Methodist circuit rider and patriot Edward Dromgoole was also the uncle of Congressman Alexander Dromgoole Sims of South Carolina.

== Early and family life ==
Born in Lawrenceville, the Brunswick County seat, to Rebecca Walton (or Wallton) and her husband, Rev. Edward Dromgoole. His father had been born in Sligo County, Ireland in 1751 and trained as a linen weaver, but converted from Roman Catholicism to Methodism (then a sect within the Church of England). This caused discord with his family, so Edward Drumgoole emigrated to Frederick, Maryland by 1770. He worked as a tailor while studying for the ministry under the direction of Irish-born Rev. Robert Strawbridge, who had in 1763 established a religious school in New Windsor, Maryland. Rev. Drumgoole was originally assigned to the Baltimore Circuit, then the Kent Circuit, but in 1775 became one of four Methodist preachers assigned to the new Brunswick Circuit, covering Southside Virginia and parts of North Carolina. The pioneering Methodist circuit preacher and patriot (who read the Declaration of Independence aloud in North Carolina) married Rebecca Wallton, whom he had converted in 1777, and the couple received a 200 acre farm in Brunswick County as a wedding present from her father. By 1784 Rev. Drumgoole had stopped his extensive circuit riding and concentrated on chapels near his home, as well as operated a store he called "Sligo." However, in the mid 1790s he had financed the construction of a house on another plantation that Rev. Drumgoole renamed "Canaan". Although the sect's founder, Rev. John Wesley opposed slavery (and his first book prohibited preachers from owning other human beings) and his mentor Rev. Strawbridge also opposed slavery, Brunswick County’s first personal property tax list in 1782 listed John Wallton as owning 12 slaves and also taxed Edward Dromgoole based on his owning 7 slaves. George, as the youngest of their six sons and two daughters who survived (two others died as infants), was thus raised in Brunswick County. He received an education appropriate to his class, then read law.

== Career ==
Admitted to the bar, Drumgoole had a private legal practice in southern Virginia and nearby areas of North Carolina. He also served in the local militia, achieving the rank of brigadier general. Drumgoole was notoriously fond of drink (reportedly declining an offer to run for vice president on a ticket with William Henry Harrison in 1840 conditioned upon abstaining from alcohol), and bred racehorses, the most famous of which was "Wagner". In the 1840 census, the last of his lifetime, Drumgoole owned 20 slaves.

== Politics and duel controversy ==
Brunswick County voters elected and re-elected Drumgoole to the Virginia House of Delegates, a part-time position, and he served from 1823 to 1826. Drumgoole then won election and re-election to the Virginia Senate, serving from 1826 to 1835. He also served as a delegate to the Virginia Constitutional Convention in 1829. In 1834, Dromgoole, a Jacksonian and Democrat defeated Whig James H. Gholson to represent Virginia's 4th congressional district in the United States House of Representatives, serving from 1835 to 1841.

He declined to run for reelection in 1840, reportedly because in early November 1837, Drumgoole shot Daniel Dugger, the owner of a Lawrenceville hotel, in a duel, and Dugger died 21 days later. Although Drumgoole again handily defeated Gholson and won re-election to Congress in 1837, many complained that Dugger had been urged into the duel unfairly. Thus Drumgoole declined to stand for re-election in 1840, made temperance pledges in 1843 and 1844, and financially supported Dugger's widow and educated Duggar's sons, Macon and John (the latter of whom may have represented Brunswick County in the Virginia House of Delegates immediately after the Civil War).

In 1842, Drumgoole was again elected to serve in Congress, this time from Virginia's 2nd congressional district, initially defeating Whig William Robertson and later twice defeateing Whig George W. Bolling. He thus served from 1843 until his death on April 27, 1847, at his estate in Brunswick County, Virginia.

== Death and legacy ==
Drumgoole was interred in the family cemetery south of the Meherrin River. Dromgoole also has a cenotaph at Congressional Cemetery in Washington, D.C.

== Elections ==
- 1835; Dromgoole was elected to the U.S. House of Representatives with 55.65% of the vote, defeating Whig James H. Gholson.
- 1837; Dromgoole was re-elected unopposed,
- 1839; Dromgoole was re-elected with 57.12% of the vote, defeating Whig James H. Gholson.
- 1843; Dromgoole was re-elected with 87.72% of the vote, defeating Whig William Robertson.
- 1845; Dromgoole was re-elected with 56.97% of the vote, defeating Whig George W. Bolling.
- 1847; Dromgoole was re-elected with 50.24% of the vote, defeating Whig George W. Bolling.

== See also ==
- List of members of the United States Congress who died in office (1790–1899)

U.S. House of Representatives
Preceded by James Gholson	Member of the U.S. House of Representatives from Virginia's 4th congressional district 1835–1841	Succeeded by William Goode
Preceded by George B. Cary	Member of the U.S. House of Representatives from Virginia's 2nd congressional district 1843–1847	Succeeded by Richard K. Meade
