= James Gholson =

American politician (1798–1848)

James Herbert Gholson

Member of the U.S. House of Representatives from Virginia's 4th district
- In office March 4, 1833 – March 3, 1835
- Preceded by: Mark Alexander
- Succeeded by: George Dromgoole

Member of the Virginia House of Delegates from Brunswick County
- In office December 6, 1830 – March 3, 1833 Serving with John E. Shell,
- Preceded by: Peter J. Beasley
- Succeeded by: Charles Turnbull

Member of the Virginia House of Delegates from Brunswick County
- In office November 29, 1824 – November 30, 1828 Serving with George Dromgoole, James B. Mallory,
- Preceded by: Jesse Read
- Succeeded by: Peter J. Beasley

Personal details
- Born: 1798 Gholsonville, Virginia
- Died: July 2, 1848 (aged 49–50) Brunswick County, Virginia
- Resting place: Blandford Cemetery, Petersburg, Virginia
- Party: Anti-Jacksonian
- Spouse: Charlotte L. Carey
- Education: Princeton College
- Profession: lawyer, judge

James Herbert Gholson (1798 – July 2, 1848) was a congressman, planter, lawyer and judge from Virginia.

== Early and family life ==
Born in Gholsonville, Brunswick County, Virginia to William Gholson and his wife Mary Saunders. He had a brother Thomas Saunders Gholson. Gholson was educated by tutors, then attended Princeton College and graduated in 1820. He married Charlotte L. Carey in Southampton, Virginia on November 22, 1827.

== Career ==
He studied law and was admitted to the bar, commencing practice in Percivals, Virginia. By 1830, his household included five white persons and 25 enslaved persons.

His uncle Thomas Gholson Jr. who died in 1816 had represented Brunswick County in the Virginia General Assembly and later the U.S. House of Representatives, and James Herbert Gholson soon carried on the family tradition. Voters elected him as one of their part-time representatives in the Virginia House of Delegates, where he served from 1824 to 1828 and again from 1830 until 1833, when he was elected to fill a vacancy caused by the death of Congressman John Claiborne. Sixty percent were the enslaved Brunswick County. He spoke about Nat Turner in Virginia General Assembly.

Elected as an Anti-Jacksonian to the United States House of Representatives in 1832, Gholson failed to win re-election, and his 1834 defeat by his sometimes co-delegate in the Virginia House of Delegates and unsuccessful opponent two years earlier, George Dromgoole, marked the demise of the Whig party in Brunswick County. Afterwards, the Virginia General Assembly elected Gholson as a judge of the circuit court for the Brunswick circuit, and he served for many years despite a controversy the year before his death alleging partiality toward his brother, who would later serve in the Second Confederate Congress.

== Death and legacy ==
Gholson died in Brunswick County on July 2, 1848, and was buried at Blandford Cemetery in Petersburg, Virginia.

== Electoral history ==
- 1833; Gholson was elected to the U.S. House of Representatives with 37.62% of the vote, defeating Democrat George Coke Dromgoole and Independents William Osborne Goode and Alexander G. Knox.
- 1835; Gholson lost his re-election bid to Dromgoole.

U.S. House of Representatives
Preceded by Mark Alexander	Member of the U.S. House of Representatives from Virginia's 4th congressional district 1833–1835	Succeeded by George Dromgoole
