= Gholsonville, Virginia =

Unincorporated community in Virginia, United States

Coordinates: 36°38′52″N 77°53′43″W

Gholsonville is an unincorporated community located in Brunswick County, in the U.S. state of Virginia. It is the birthplace of former United States Representative James Gholson.
