= John Botts =

American politician from Virginia (1802–1869)

John Minor Botts
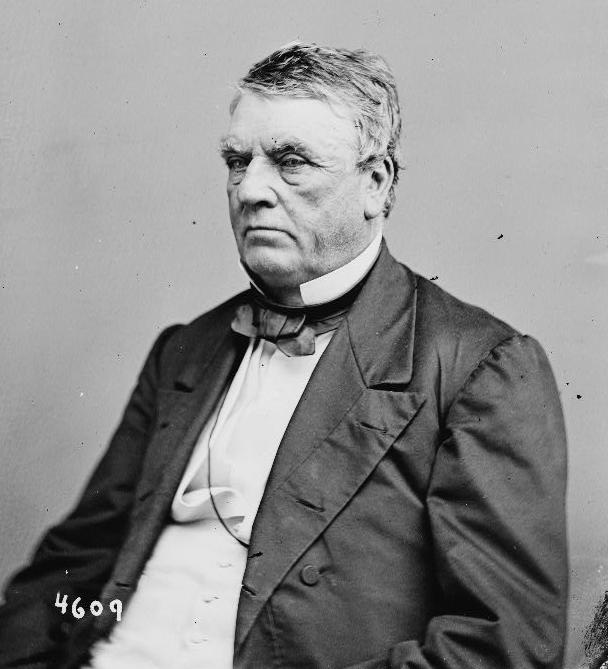

Member of the U.S. House of Representatives from Virginia
- In office March 4, 1847 – March 3, 1849
- Preceded by: James Seddon
- Succeeded by: James Seddon
- Constituency: 6th district
- In office March 4, 1839 – March 3, 1843
- Preceded by: John Robertson
- Succeeded by: William Taylor
- Constituency: 11th district

Chairman of the Committee on Military Affairs
- In office March 4, 1847 – March 3, 1849
- Preceded by: Hugh Haralson
- Succeeded by: Armistead Burt

Member of the Virginia House of Delegates from Henrico County
- In office 1833–1838
- Preceded by: Robert A. Mayo
- Succeeded by: Sherwin McRae

Personal details
- Born: September 16, 1802 Dumfries, Virginia, U.S.
- Died: January 8, 1869 (aged 66) Culpeper, Virginia, U.S.
- Party: Whig
- Other political affiliations: Constitutional Union
- Profession: Politician, Lawyer

John Minor Botts (September 16, 1802 – January 8, 1869) was a nineteenth-century politician, planter and lawyer from Virginia. He was a prominent Unionist in Richmond, Virginia, during the American Civil War.

== Early and family life ==
Botts was born in Dumfries, Virginia, to prominent lawyer Benjamin Gaines Botts and his wife Jane Tyler Botts. Both of his parents died in the Richmond Theatre fire on December 26, 1811, so John and his siblings were raised by relatives in Fredericksburg. Botts attended the common schools in Richmond, Virginia, then studied law.

He married Mary Whiting Blair (1801-1841), and they had several children.

== Career ==
After admission to the Virginia bar in 1830, Botts moved to Henrico County, Virginia, outside Richmond. He operated a plantation called "Half Sink" on the Chickahominy River about nine miles north of downtown Richmond. He used the progressive agricultural methods advocated in the Southern Planter, as well as slave labor. Botts also raised racehorses and practiced law.

=== Political career ===
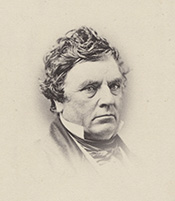
Botts, circa 1850

Botts lost his first run for political office in 1831, but won the following year and represented Henrico County in the Virginia House of Delegates from 1833 to 1839. In 1835, he seemed to lose to William B. Randolph, but successfully challenged the results in court. In 1836, he again appeared to lose, to William N. Whiting, but again won a court challenge and was seated.

In 1838, voters elected Botts as a Whig to the United States House of Representatives and William N. Whiting succeeded him as Henrico's state delegate. Unlike most Whigs, Botts opposed the Second Bank of the United States on constitutional grounds, but also considering President Andrew Jackson's veto of the bank's renewed charter encroachment upon Congress's powers, therefore by 1841 Botts favored a national bank. Botts was one of the few southern representatives to oppose the Democrats' "gag rule" (refusing to receive or air) antislavery petitions, he argued that violated the constitutional right to petition the government and also eliminated an important safety valve which relieved sectional agitation.

Botts served in Congress from 1839 to 1843 however he was defeated for reelection in 1842 (following redistricting after the 1840 census). Although a slaveholder, Botts vehemently opposed extension of slavery into territories, and blamed Democrat John C. Calhoun for increasing sectional animosities by trying to annex Texas. On July 18, 1842, Botts introduced a resolution that levied several charges against President John Tyler and called for a nine-member committee to investigate his behavior, with the expectation of a formal impeachment recommendation. The Botts bill, however, was tabled until the following January, when it was rejected after Botts' defeat for reelection, 127−83. After this defeat, Botts continued to publish letters and articles opposing Texas' annexation.

Botts won election to Congress again in 1846, serving from 1847 to 1849. He was chairman of the Committee on Military Affairs from 1847 to 1849, using it to support the Army (in which his son fought and died) rather than to oppose the war. Botts again lost his reelection bid in 1848, but he was elected again in 1850.

Botts also served as one of six delegates representing the city of Richmond and the counties of Charles City, Henrico, and New Kent in the Virginia Constitutional Convention of 1850-1851. There, Botts chaired the committee on the Bill of Rights and argued for abolishing the death penalty and imprisonment for debt, as well as for extending the franchise and giving more voice to Western Virginians. He also proposed requiring that before any manumission of a slave, the owner must either arrange for the person's travel out of the state or secure legislative permission to remain in the state.

Botts resumed practicing law in Richmond in 1852. With the demise of the Whig party (whose last national convention he attended in 1852), he ran for Congress on the Know Nothing Party ticket in 1854, but lost. His opposition to the admission of Kansas as a slave state also bucked public opinion in Virginia.

=== Prelude and American Civil War ===
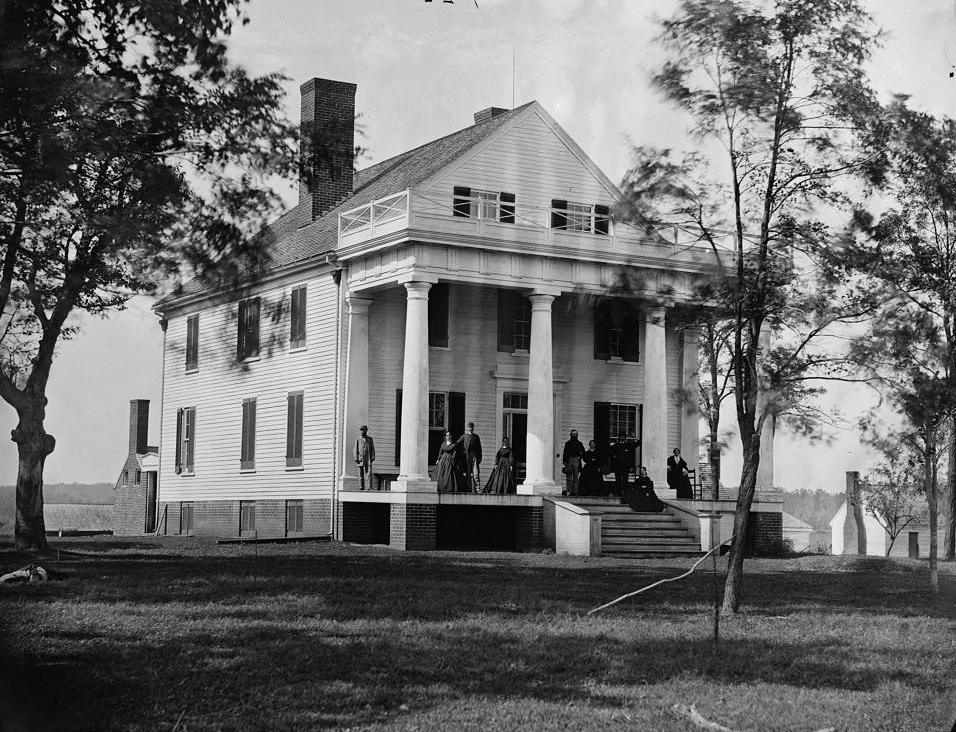
Botts and family on porch of their home in Culpeper, Virginia, September 1863. Photos by Timothy H. O'Sullivan.

Botts was not fond of the Democratic Party. He believed that Virginian governor Henry A. Wise had secretly planned John Brown's 1859 raid to inflame the citizenry. With the support of Anna Ella Carroll, Botts attempted to unite the Know Nothing Party with the new Republican Party, but failed to win the support of either as a presidential candidate in 1860. During the presidential election of 1860, Botts aligned with the United States Constitutional Union Party and supported John Bell. Though Bell was outpolled nationally by both the winning candidate Republican Abraham Lincoln and the Northern Democrat Stephen A. Douglas, Botts continued to support the principles of the Constitutional Union party. Even Carroll before her death acknowledged Botts was too outspoken and brusque to attract enough support.

Botts failed to attract sufficient support as a Unionist delegate to attend Virginia's Secession Convention of 1861, although fellow Unionist John Brown Baldwin was elected. President Lincoln met separately with Baldwin and Botts, who later published different accounts of their meetings, neither of which stopped Virginia from seceding. Botts blamed Baldwin for keeping Lincoln's peace offer secret while his native state moved toward secession.

Botts retired to his Henrico County farm after Virginia declared its secession in the American Civil War, but continued to write letters to newspaper editors and remained uncompromisingly Unionist in his sentiments.

Through the war, Botts refused to fight against Virginia, but remained in the state. On March 2, 1862, Richmond's Confederate provost marshal John H. Winder jailed Botts and fellow Unionist Franklin Stearns without trial for espousing Unionist positions after the Confederacy suspended the right of habeas corpus. About 150 people were eventually picked up, and Stearns was later placed under house arrest in his Richmond warehouse, where his family could care for him. Botts stated that while he was in captivity Captain George W. Alexander attempted to persuade him to join the Confederate army as a brigadier general in exchange for his freedom.

Botts spent eight weeks in solitary confinement. He was released after promising not to publish any more incendiary letters, and in January 1863 moved to a plantation he had won gambling, Auburn, in Culpeper County, Virginia, where Botts entertained both Union and Confederate officers at various times. Botts had promised he would move away from Richmond to ensure his pardon. He was arrested on October 12, 1863, by order of Confederate General J. E. B. Stuart but was released later the same day.

=== Postwar ===
In 1864, the rump general assembly at Alexandria attempted to elect Botts to the U.S. Senate, but he declined. On the night of President Lincoln's assassination, several men arrived at his house and attempted to rob Botts after he answered their knock, but he closed the door in their faces.

In May 1866, Botts presided over a Unionist convention, and became a delegate to the Southern Loyalists' Convention in Philadelphia later that year, where he argued against universal manhood suffrage. Botts proposed gradual emancipation of slaves, and would allow only some African Americans to vote. However, Radical Republicans defeated the Southern Unionists, and the Reconstruction Era began. Botts was defeated when he ran to become a delegate to Virginia's Constitutional Convention of 1867-1868, eventually led by John Curtiss Underwood. Botts last addressed Republicans in February 1868.

== Death ==
Botts died on January 8, 1869, in Culpeper, Virginia.

== Elections of 1846, 1848, 1850 ==
Botts was elected to the U.S. House of Representatives in 1846 with 55.37% of the vote, defeating Democrat Walter D. Leake. He then failed to be re-elected to Congress in races held in 1848 and 1850, but he was elected as a delegate to the Virginia Constitutional Convention of 1850 where he spoke as a reformer to expand the Virginia electorate.

== Memoirs ==
Botts published his memoirs, The Great Rebellion: Its Secret History, Rise, Progress, and Disastrous Failure (1866).

== See also ==
- Virginia Constitutional Convention of 1850

U.S. House of Representatives
Preceded by John Robertson	Member of the U.S. House of Representatives from Virginia's 11th congressional district 1839–1843	Succeeded by William Taylor
Preceded by James Seddon	Member of the U.S. House of Representatives from Virginia's 6th congressional district 1847–1849	Succeeded by James Seddon
