= Blandford Cemetery =

Historic cemetery in Virginia, United States

- U.S. National Register of Historic Places
- Virginia Landmarks Register
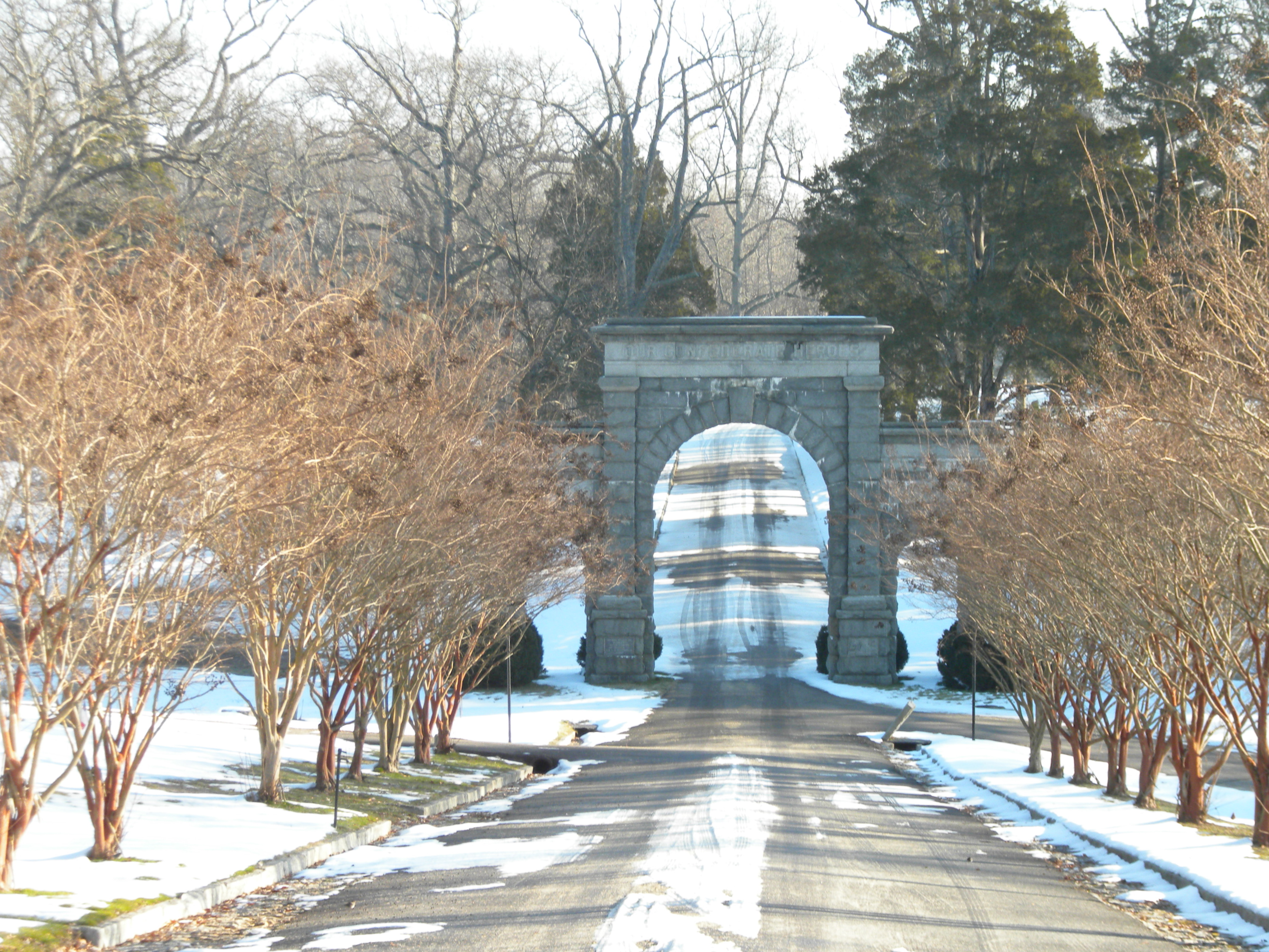
- The Memorial Arch at Blandford Cemetery, constructed in 1913 by Burns and Campbell.

- Location within Virginia Location within the United States
- Location: 319 S. Crater Rd., Petersburg, Virginia
- Coordinates: 37°13′33″N 77°22′50″W
- Area: 189 acres (76 ha)
- Built: 1702
- Architect: Davidson, James; Bowie, McCleary & Wright
- Architectural style: Mid 19th Century Revival, Early Republic, Late Victorian
- NRHP reference No.: 92001371
- VLR No.: 123-0110

Significant dates
- Added to NRHP: October 15, 1992
- Designated VLR: April 22, 1992

Blandford Cemetery is a historic cemetery located in Petersburg, Virginia. It contains remains of people of all classes and races as well as veterans of every American war. Blandford holds a mass grave of 30,000 Confederates killed in the Siege of Petersburg (1864–65) and other battles during the American Civil War. Only 3,700 names of the Confederate soldiers interred are known. Blandford Cemetery was listed on the National Register of Historic Places in 1992, in part through the efforts of Charlotte Irving, first president of the Historic Blandford Cemetery Foundation. In addition to this cemetery's historic African American section discussed below, it is located adjacent to the People's Memorial Cemetery, a historic African-American cemetery, and small cemeteries containing additional dead from the lengthy Siege of Petersburg and Battle of the Crater in 1864.

Historic Blandford Church also adjoins the cemetery. Although deconsecrated for more than a century, it features a Confederate memorial that features a full set of windows designed by Tiffany studios.

== History ==
The Virginia General Assembly established Bristol Parish in 1643 to serve colonists who were moving westward and settling along the James River and its tributary Appomattox River. A year later (in response to a native American uprising) it ordered construction of Fort Henry (under the command of Abraham Wood) and other log forts to defend settlements on the south side of the James River. The fort became a trading center (a post having been established by Wood's son-in-law Peter Jones Jr.) and a graveyard was established nearby, as was a chapel. The oldest stone, marking the grave of Richard Yarbrough, reads 1702, and some controversy exists as to whether Yarborough was buried in that location, especially since a marker for John Herbert (who died in 1704) was moved from his former home "Puddleduck" in the late 19th century. In 1724 Bristol Parish contained 450 families (or about 1100 titheable persons). However, by 1733 Ferry Chapel (built of wood) had fallen into severe disrepair, and in 1735 the parish was divided, with the new Dale and Raleigh parishes serving the western areas. Nonetheless, the vestry acquired land on a scenic overlook above the Appomattox River and established a building committee. Colonel Robert Bolling (who had earlier been authorized to build a tobacco inspection station, indicating the important new trade in the area), Major William Poythress and Captain William Starke contracted with Colonel Thomas Ravenscroft to build a brick church on Well's Hill, which was delayed somewhat by litigation but completed enough to use on August 13, 1737. In early 1738 Petersburg was laid out on the lands of Abraham Jones, and William Poythress soon established a settlement known as Blandford on his lands. The Virginia General Assembly chartered both settlements in 1748. In 1752 it established Dinwiddie County from what had been vast Prince George County, as well as authorized a third town in the area, called Pocahontas, on the north side of the Appomattox River across from both Blandford and Petersburg. A decade later, the vestry authorized a brick wall to enclose the churchyard, and during this period the brick church became known as Blandford Church. However, Petersburg also had burying ground, as did individual plantations. Following the Revolutionary War, the towns of Petersburg, Blandford and Pocahontas were incorporated as the borough of Petersburg, and additional lots laid out on former Bolling land between Blandford and Petersburg. The Blandford Church also acquired additional land and enclosed it by a wall by 1801. However, perhaps in part because of the disestablishment of the Episcopal Church and sale of its glebe lands, the Blandford church was only used a half dozen times per year by 1799 and its glebe lands sold in 1801. Soon, the cemetery was abandoned and fell into ruin and was acquired by the City of Petersburg in 1819.

Between 1820 and 1865, the burying ground transmuted into a municipal cemetery, as well as a showplace for the city's ironwork. Although it never fit the definition of a rural cemetery (and continued its grid plan), its development was effected by that garden and symbol-intensive movement as well as sometimes extreme mourning customs. The city of Petersburg prospered and developed as a manufacturing center, with six tobacco factories by 1835 and by 1850 it had become Virginia's third largest city. In 1840 a group of African American men acquired an acre of land across the road from the Blandford Cemetery, which ultimately became People's Memorial Cemetery and one of Virginia's largest African American cemeteries. Other nearby African American cemeteries were known as East View, Wilkerson's Memorial Cemetery and Little Church cemetery, but in 1851 at the urging of Councilman William Hinton, the Petersburg City Council permitted the burial of African Americans in an isolated area on the eastern edge of Blandford Cemetery, separated by a fence. In 1854, the city bought 20 acres to expand Blandford Cemetery By the decade's end, Robert Buckner Bolling had constructed a granite and marble mausoleum for his family's dead that aspired to be one of the finest and imposing of its type in the Southern States.

During the American Civil War, not only did Petersburg send many troops to fight in the Confederate States Army, it became a crucial manufacturing, hospital and munitions hub. Railroads through Petersburg gave the state and Confederate capital at Richmond crucial supplies, so that it became a target late in the conflict. The Siege of Petersburg lasted from June 15, 1864, until the city surrendered on April 3, 1865, with the cemetery hill becoming a strategic target because of its view over the city and the important railroad bridge over the Appomattox River. The cemetery was directly behind Gracie's Colquitt's and Elliott's salients in the confederate siege line. Over the entrance road a stone arch is inscribed "Our Confederate Heroes" with the dates 1861–1865 and 1866–1913.

Shortly after the war, Nora Fontaine Maury Davidson, a schoolteacher who with her two sisters established a Confederate School (later renamed Davidson's Seminary), became a passionate advocate for transforming Blandford Cemetery into a Confederate shrine. Some accounts claim she led her students to decorate the graves of the fallen in the spring of 1865. However, in her memoir, Cullings from the Confederacy: A collection of Southern Poems, Original and Others, Popular during the War Between the States and Incidents and Facts worth recalling, 1862–1865 (1903), she mentions taking 80 pupils on May 26, 1866, to decorate those killed on the day of Petersburg's evacuation. Davidson denied being a member of the Memorial Society of the Ladies of the City of Petersburg, which was formed on May 20, soon had 200 members and which laid decorations on the graves on June 9, 1866, the anniversary of the "Battle of Old Men and Boys" defending the city. In any event Blandford Cemetery became the site of one of the earliest Decoration Day ceremonies. In March 1868, the wife of Union General John A. Logan visited Blandford Church and noticed flowers and tiny Confederate flags on the soldiers' graves, as she wrote in a 1903 Los Angeles Daily Times article and in her book Remniscences of a Soldier's Wife. On May 5, 1868, General Logan issued General Order No. 11 naming May 30 as the day for decorating the graves of the comrades who died in defense of their country during the rebellion. General Logan also advocated within the Grand Army of the Republic (a very large Union veterans association) calling for the observance of Memorial Day. Locals say that Decoration Day served as the inspiration for the federal Memorial Day, established by Congressional legislation in 1971 as the last Monday in May.

In 2014 Bellware and Gardiner dismissed this claim in The Genesis of the Memorial Day Holiday in America, pointing out that General Logan was aware of the southern observances of Memorial Day prior to his wife's trip to Virginia in 1868 and had mentioned them in a speech in 1866.

In 1884 the Ladies Memorial Association raised money to erect a Gothic arch in iron at the entrance to Memorial Hill, inscribed "Our Confederate Dead" on one side on "Waiting for Reveille" on the back. In 1889, the Ladies Memorial Association laid the cornerstone for a granite monument with a large bronze Confederate soldier atop Memorial Hill, noting that remains had been brought there for reinterment from the great battlefields of Fredericksburg, Manassas, the Wilderness, Spottsylvania and Sharpsburg as well as nearby. In 1912 another monument was dedicated to the 31 members of New Orleans' Washington Artillery who died during the Siege of Petersburg. Further reburials have occurred as late as 1992.

In 1900, the Ladies Memorial Associateion began converting Blandford Church into a mortuary and memorial chapel.

Because of vandalism in 1986 and 1987, including to the Richard Yarbrough gravestone, the Foundation reconstructed the entrances. to make it more secure. The cemetery suffered severe destruction in Hurricane Isabel in 2003, with large and small trees uprooted, and some ironwork and table tombs crushed.

== Notable burials ==
- Confederate Brigadier General Cullen A. Battle
- Colonel Robert Bolling (1646–1709) English-born merchant and planter
- John Herbert Claiborne (1828–1905) politician and medical administrator
- Joseph Cotten (1905–1994) film, stage, radio and television actor
- Patrick H. Drewry (1875–1947) politician
- James Gholson (1798–1848) politician
- Alfred W. Harris, African American lawyer and legislator
- Alva Curtis Hartsfield (?–May 15, 1864): one of 10 students from the Virginia Military Institute killed at the Battle of New Market on May 15, 1864.
- Luther Porter Jackson (1892–1950), American professor and historian
- Francis R. Lassiter (1866–1909), U.S. Representative
- Frank Lyon (1867–1955), American lawyer, newspaper publisher and land developer
- Confederate Major General William Mahone, his wife Otelia and kinfolk
- Benjamin McCandlish, United States Navy Commodore and former Naval Governor of Guam.
- Margherita Wood McCandlish (1892–1954), American former First Lady of Guam.
- William Robertson McKenney, U. S. Representative
- Patricia Medina (1919–2012) British actress.
- Major General William Phillips
- William Roy Smith (1920–1993), member of the Virginia House of Delegates
- Mary Tannahill (1863–1951) artist
- Edward Carrington Venable, U.S. Representative
- Confederate Brigadier General David A. Weisiger
- Florence Saunders Farley (1928–2022), politician who served as the first Black female mayor of Petersburg, Virginia
