= McRae (surname) =

McRae is a surname. Notable people with this surname include:

== Athletes and coaches ==
- Alister McRae (born 1970), British rally champion
- Brian McRae (born 1967), baseball player
- Chann McRae (born 1971), American road bicycle racer
- Charles McRae (born 1968), American football player and business executive
- Colin McRae (1968–2007), British rally driver
- Conrad McRae (1971–2000), American basketball player
- Graham McRae (1940–2021), New Zealand racing driver
- James McRae (born 1987), Australian former representative rower
- Jimmy McRae (born 1943), British rally driver
- Jordan McRae (born 1991), American basketball player
- Ken McRae (born 1968), Canadian ice hockey player
- Mike McRae (long jumper) (born 1955), American long jumper
- Mike McRae (baseball), Canadian baseball coach
- Shaun McRae (born 1959), Australian rugby coach
- Tim McRae (born 1970), American weightlifter
- William McRae (1909–1973), American football player and jurist

== Actors, authors, and singers ==
- Bruce McRae (1867–1927), American actor
- Carmen McRae (1920–1994), American jazz singer
- Hamish McRae, British writer and journalist
- Tate McRae (born 2003), Canadian singer and dancer
- Tom McRae, British singer-songwriter
- Wally McRae (1936–2025), American cowboy poet

== Politicians ==
- Alexander Duncan McRae (1874–1946), Canadian businessman, Army general, and politician
- Chuck McRae (born c. 1939), American jurist from Mississippi
- John J. McRae (1815–1868), American politician
- Thomas Chipman McRae (1851–1929), American politician
- William Plummer McRae (died 1901), American politician from Virginia
- Willie McRae (1923–1985), Scottish politician

== Other people ==
- Cameron Farquhar McRae (1812–1872), Episcopalian minister
- Cameron Farquhar McRae (1873–1954), Episcopalian missionary in China
- Donald McRae (disambiguation), various people
- Dandridge McRae (1829–1899), American Civil War general
- Emma Montgomery McRae (1848–1919), American professor of literature
- Hal McRae (born 1945), baseball manager and player
- James McRae (United States Army officer) (1862–1940), American army officer
- James W. McRae (1910–1960), American engineer
- John Rodney McRae (1934–2005), American murderer
- William McRae (botanist) (1878–1952), Scottish botanist
