= Cameron Farquhar McRae =

Cameron Farquhar McRae may refer to:

- Cameron Farquhar McRae (born 1812) (1812–1872), American Episcopalian minister
- Cameron Farquhar McRae (born 1873) (1873–1954), American Episcopalian missionary in Shanghai
