= All Saints Church, Shanghai =

1925 church in Huangpu, Shanghai

All Saints Church
- 诸圣堂
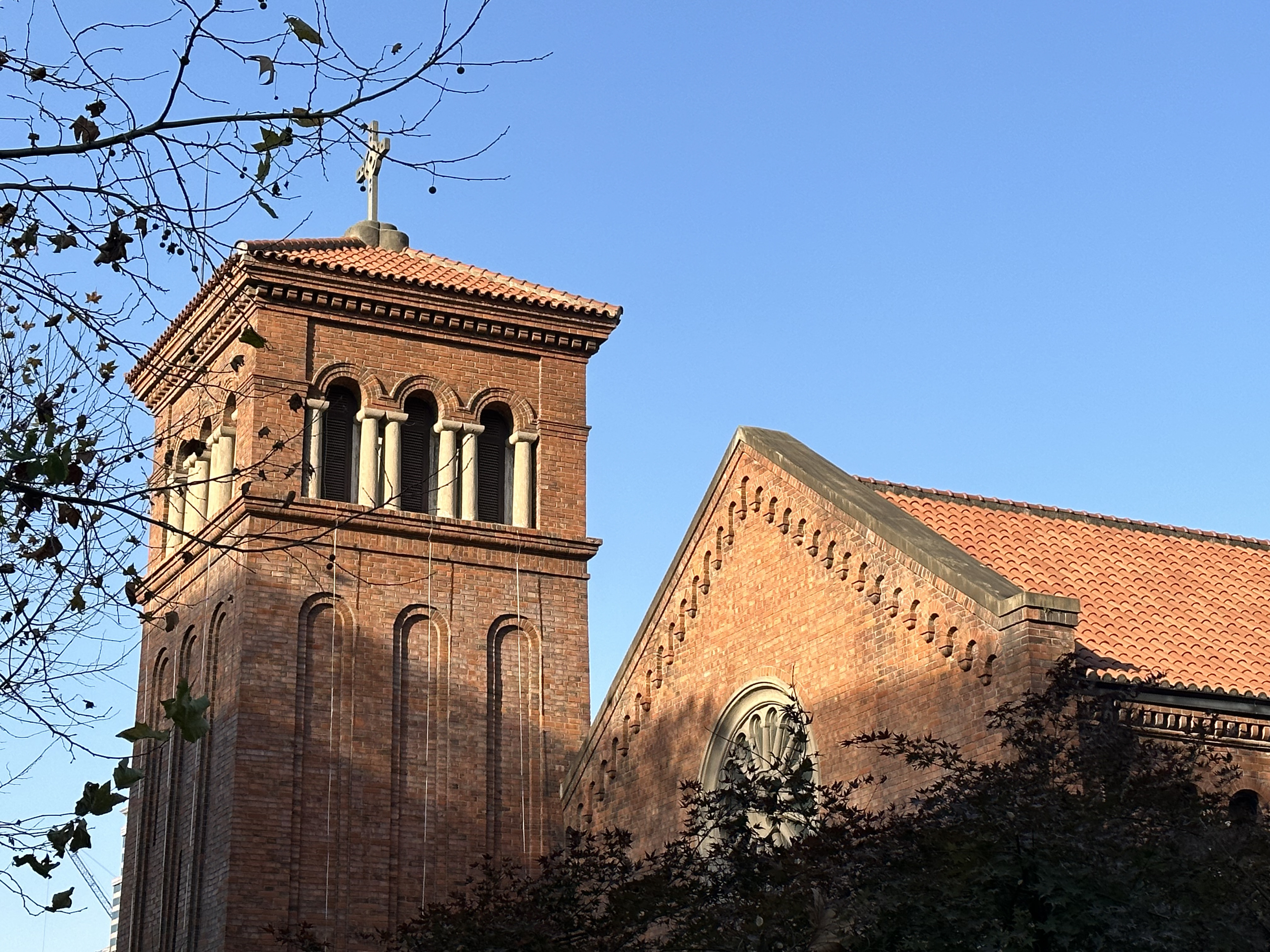
- The Neo-Romanesque tower and sanctuary of All Saints, 2023. The rose window on top of the sanctuary is visible.
- All Saints Church
- 31°13′03″N 121°28′09″E
- Address: 425 Middle Fuxing Rd, Huangpu District, Shanghai
- Country: China
- Denomination: Chung Hua Sheng Kung Hui (1925–1958); Protestant (1958–)

History
- Status: Church
- Founded: 1915
- Founder: Cameron Farquhar McRae

Architecture
- Functional status: Active
- Style: Neo-Romanesque
- Completed: 1925

All Saints Church (Chinese: 诸圣堂; pinyin: Zhūshèng táng) is a Protestant Christian place of worship in Huangpu, Shanghai, China. Originally founded as an Anglican church in 1925, it joined general Protestant worship in 1958. It was closed during the Cultural Revolution, but was reopened in 1982. The only surviving Neo-Romanesque church building in the city, it is listed as one of the Featured Historical Buildings of Shanghai.

== History ==
In 1915, Cameron Farquhar McRae, a missionary of the Episcopal Church, purchased a house in the Shanghai French Concession as his preaching station. In 1919, Bishop Frederick Graves purchased the land that the church currently occupies and built the first church building. The current church building was planned by McRae and Wang Xiaokui (汪孝奎), and was completed and consecrated on Christmas Day in 1925. It was under the administration of the Chung Hua Sheng Kung Hui (the Anglican Church in China, abbr. CHSKH).

On 1 November 1927, Chen Yong'en was consecrated was consecrated as assistant bishop of Fukien at the church. On 9 June 1934, Shen Zigao was consecrated as bishop of Shensi at the church. Shen was the first Anglican diocesan bishop of Chinese origin. In 1949, the church had 633 baptised and 387 confirmed congregants. The pastors at the time were Wei Xiben (魏希本) and Peng Shengyong (彭聖傭).

During the People's Republic of China, Protestant churches in Shanghai started to practice non-denominational joint worship (联合礼拜) since 1958, and All Saints was designated as the joint worship location in Luwan District. The church was closed during the Cultural Revolution, and was reopened in 1982. About 3,400 people were baptised at the church from 1983 to 1994. Since 1985, a special worship service for individuals with blindness on the fourth Sunday of every month. By December 1998, the church had a congregation of 6,200 on record. The church was renovated in 2009 and in 2014.

== Architecture ==
The church was built in the Anglican high church style of the 17th century, and it is the only surviving Neo-Romanesque church in Shanghai. It is in basilica form and is made of red bricks. There is a square tower at the north-west corner of the church.

The church faces west. At the front of the church, there is a narthex with three arched doorways separated by Corinthian columns. Above the narthex there is a rose window. The main sanctuary consists of a nave in the middle and two aisles on the sides, and the roof is supported by five timber frames. There are two smaller chapels at the ends of the transept. In 2009, ground stakes were added to improve the church's structural integrity, and paint was removed inside the sanctuary. In 2014, an Anglican-style church tabernacle was installed, and the pulpit is moved to the side of the choir according to Anglican customs. The 2014 improvements were focused on returning the church interior to the original state in 1925, using an early photograph found in 2011 as reference.

The church has an area of 1,326 square metres (14,270 sq ft). The main sanctuary has a capacity of 500 people, while the chapel and the church annex can host 1,000 people. It is listed as one of the Featured Historical Buildings of Shanghai (优秀历史建筑).

== Gallery ==
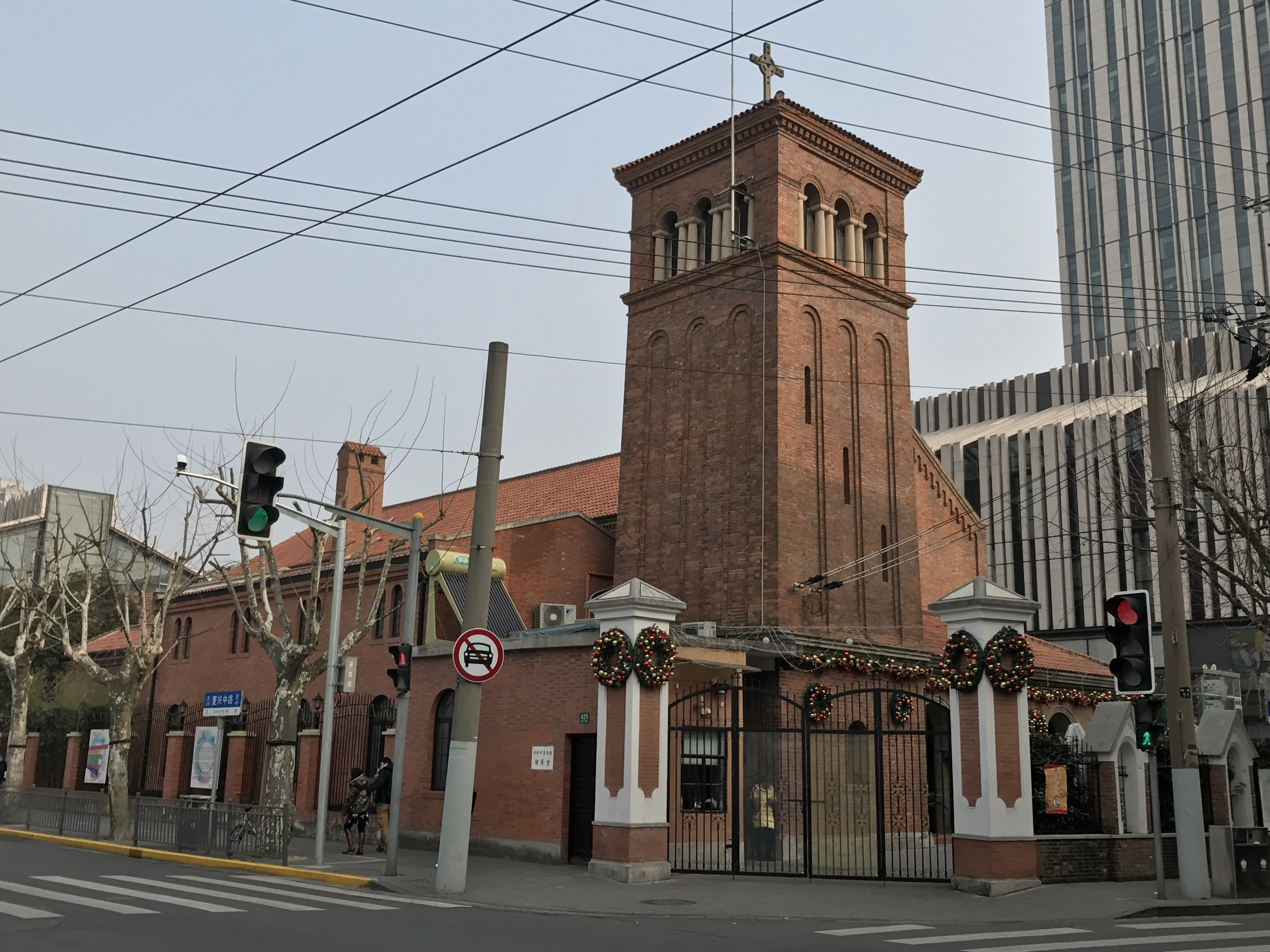
The church seen from Middle Fuxing Road

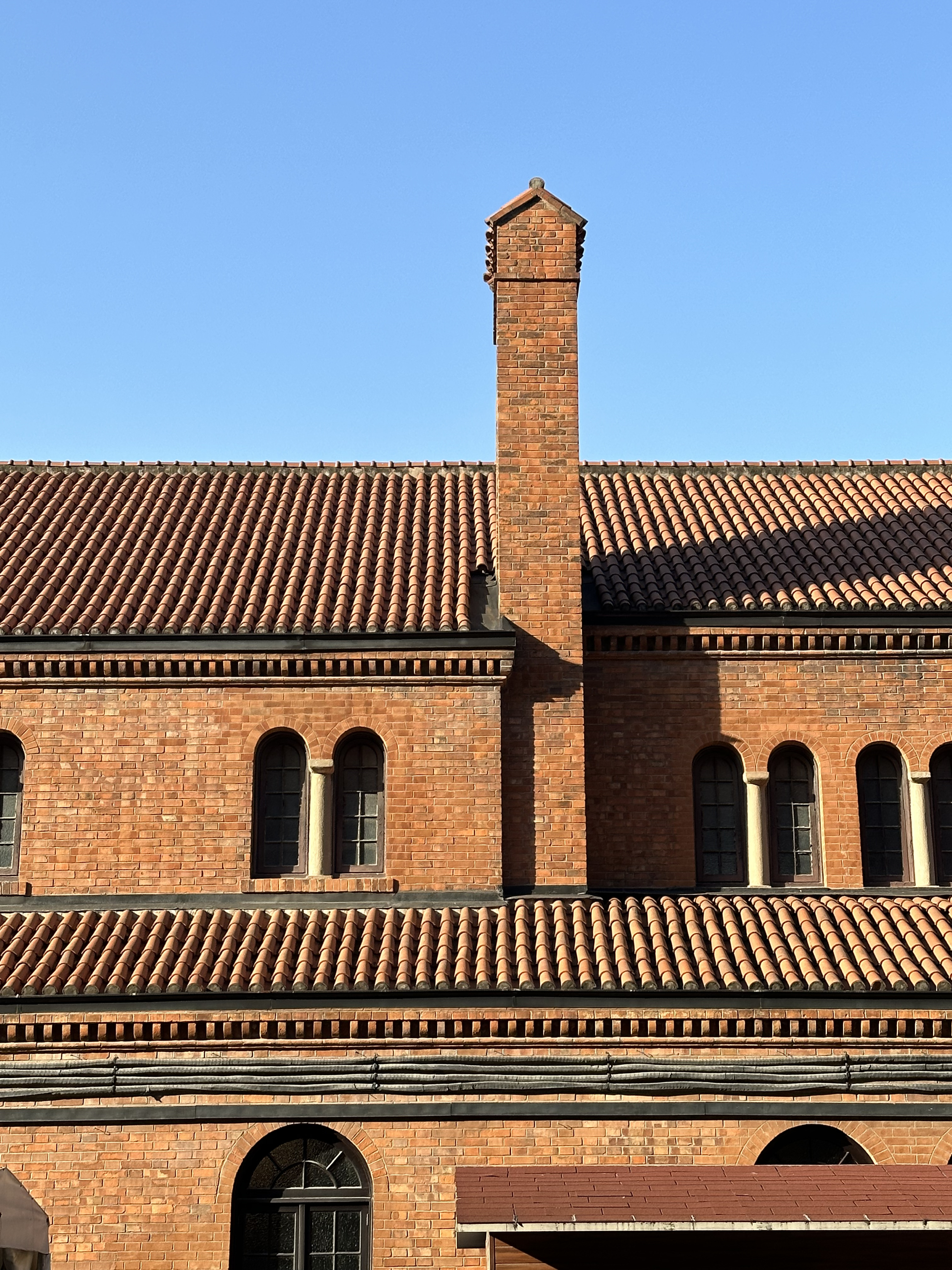
The side view of the church, showing Neo-Romanesque windows

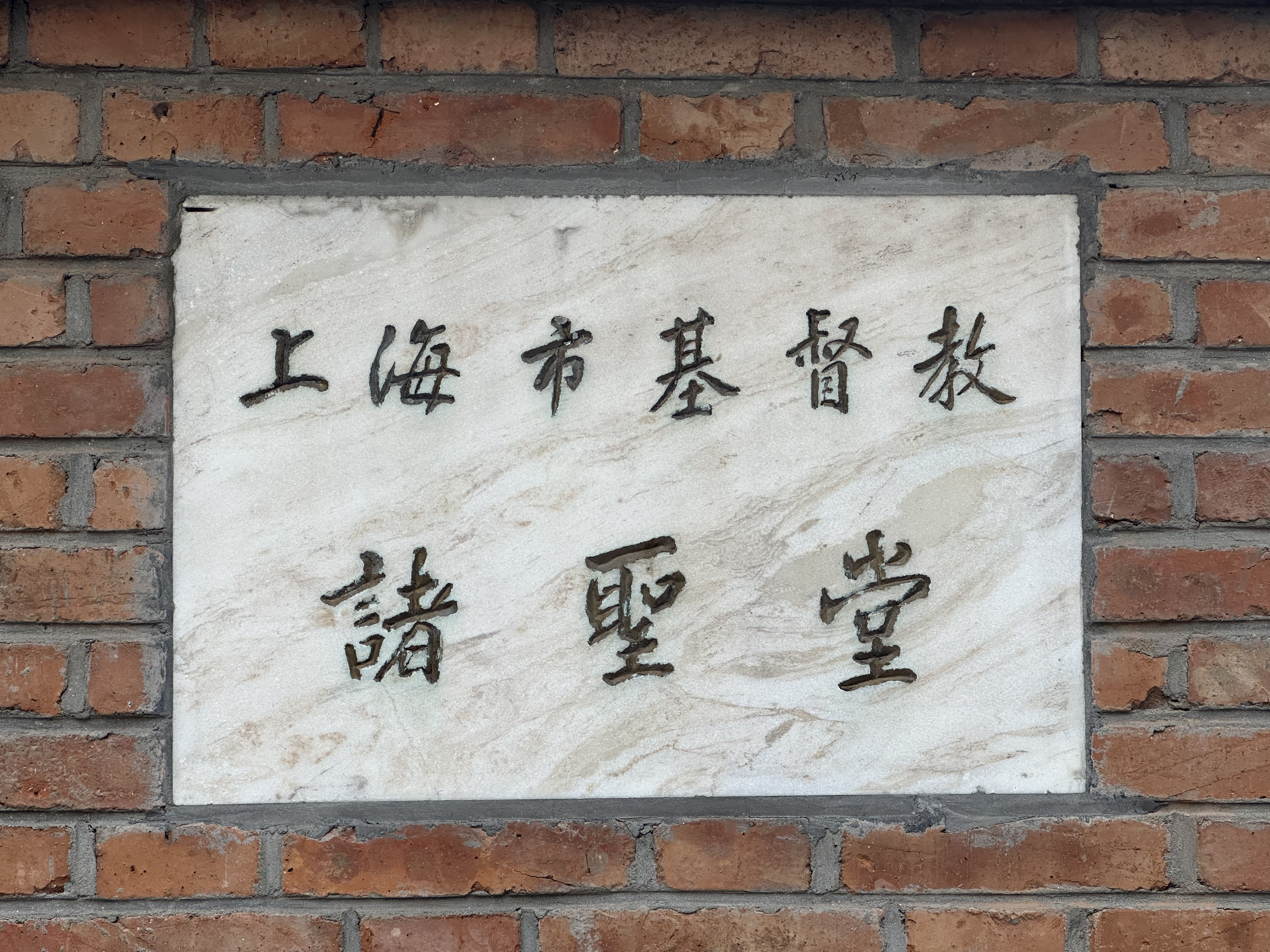
The plaque of the church, displaying its name in Chinese "諸聖堂"

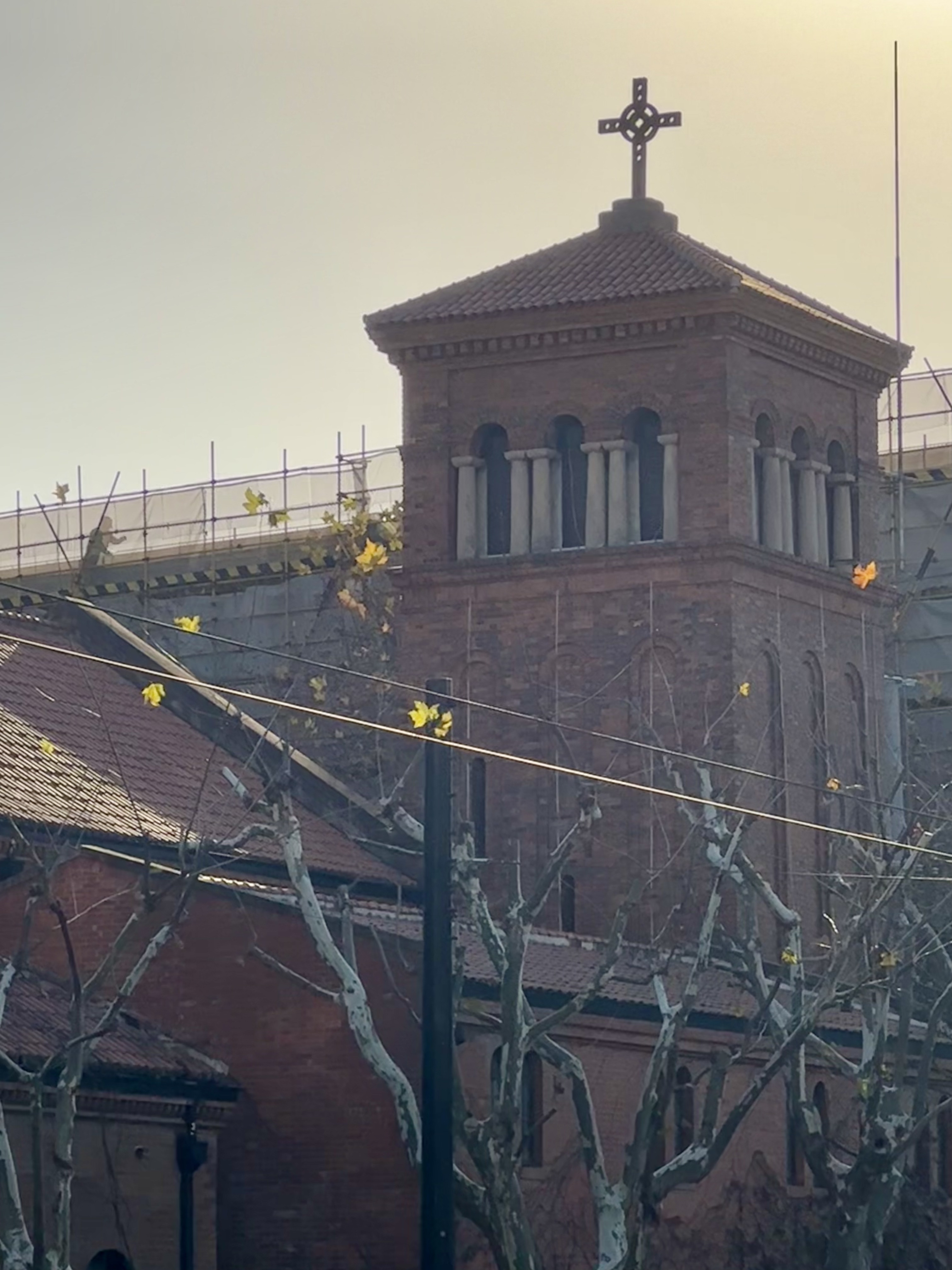
The tower of the church with a cross on top

== See also ==
- List of historic buildings in Shanghai
- Anglican Diocese of Shanghai
- Holy Trinity Cathedral, Shanghai
- Huizhong Church, Shanghai
