= Patrick H. Drewry =

American politician (1875–1947)

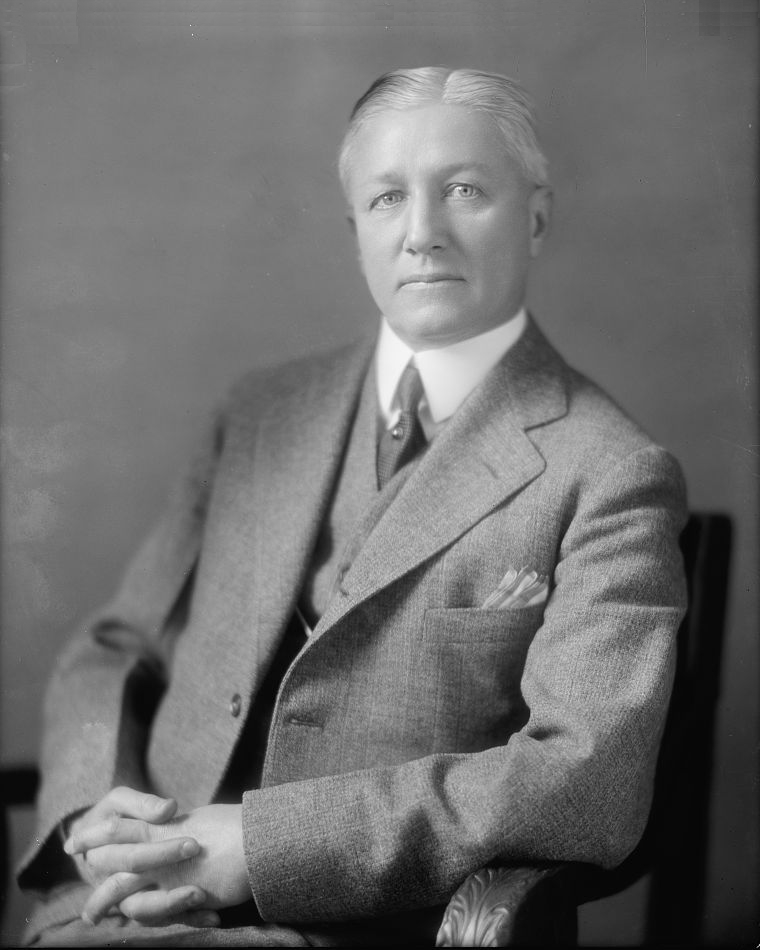

Member of the U.S. House of Representatives from Virginia's 4th district
- In office April 27, 1920 – December 21, 1947 at-large: March 4, 1933 – January 3, 1935
- Preceded by: Walter A. Watson
- Succeeded by: Watkins Abbitt

Member of the Virginia Senate from the 29th district
- In office January 10, 1912 – April 27, 1920
- Preceded by: Charles T. Lassiter
- Succeeded by: Morton G. Goode

Personal details
- Born: Patrick Henry Drewry; May 24, 1875 Petersburg, Virginia, U.S.
- Died: December 21, 1947 (aged 72) Petersburg, Virginia, U.S.
- Party: Democratic
- Spouse: Mary E. Metcalf (m. 1906)
- Education: Randolph-Macon College; University of Virginia

Patrick Henry Drewry (May 24, 1875 – December 21, 1947) was an American lawyer and Democratic politician from Virginia. He served in the Virginia Senate (1912–1920). He also represented Virginia's 4th congressional district in the United States House of Representatives from 1920 until his death in 1947. Drewry was a long-serving member of the House Naval Affairs Committee and was involved in naval expansion efforts during World War II.

== Early life and education ==
Drewry was born on May 24, 1875 in Petersburg, Virginia. He was one of three surviving sons born to Dr. Emmett Arrington Drewry (1838–1891) and his second wife, Altazera (née Laughton). His father was a physician who had served as a surgeon with the 9th Virginia Infantry during the American Civil War and later helped found the Medical Society of Virginia. The Drewry family was established in the region; his paternal grandfather, James Drewry (1808–1878), was a major landowner in Southampton County, Virginia where the town of Drewryville was named in the family's honor. His cousin, Dr. William Francis Drewry, was also active in civic life, serving as the Mayor of Petersburg and as superintendent of the Central State Hospital.

Drewry attended local public schools, including Petersburg High School, and McCabe's University School. He then pursued higher education at Randolph-Macon College in Ashland, Virginia, graduating in 1896. He subsequently studied law at the University of Virginia School of Law. In 1946, a year before his death, he received an honorary LL.D. degree from his alma mater, Randolph-Macon.

In 1906, Drewry married Mary Elizabeth Metcalf in Palmyra, Missouri. The couple settled in Petersburg and had three sons.

== Career ==
After being admitted to the bar in 1901, Drewry began legal practice in Petersburg. He was active in the Washington Street Methodist Church (and wrote a history of it), as well as the Sons of Confederate Veterans (became Commander of the A.P. Hill Camp, i.e. Petersburg chapter). Drewry also was director of the Petersburg Savings and American Trust Co.

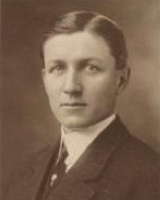
Drewry as a state senator during the 1912 Virginia General Assembly

== Political career ==
A member of the Martin Organization, which evolved into the Byrd Organization, Drewry won his first election in 1911, to the Senate of Virginia, where he replaced Spanish–American War veteran Charles T. Lassiter (brother of Major General William Lassiter and the recently deceased Congressman Francis Rives Lassiter. Drewry represented the city of Petersburg and neighboring Dinwiddie County, and won re-election, thus serving (part-time) from 1912 until 1920. An advocate for medical and charitable causes, Drewry also sponsored the state's vital statistics bill. Drewry was also a delegate to the Democratic State conventions in 1912, 1916, 1920, and 1924. In 1916, he served as delegate to the Democratic National Convention. A fiscal conservative, Drewry became chairman of the Economy and Efficiency Commission of Virginia in 1916–1918. He also accepted appointments as chairman of the State auditing committee (1916 to 1920), and as chairman of the State advisory board (1919).

Drewry won election as a Democrat to the Sixty-sixth Congress to fill the vacancy caused by the death of Walter A. Watson. He won reelection to the Sixty-seventh and thirteen succeeding Congresses. Thus Drewry served from April 27, 1920, until his death. He also served as member of the Board of Visitors to the United States Naval Academy at Annapolis in 1925 and several additional times, as ranking member of the House Naval Affairs Committee. Drewry was a member of the Democratic National Congressional Committee from 1923 to 1927, and chairman of the Democratic National Committee in 1935.

== Death and legacy ==
Drewry died in Petersburg, Virginia on December 21, 1947. Unlike his father, who had been interred in the family graveyard in Drewryville, but like his brothers who practiced in Norfolk and Martinsville and were interred in those locations, Congressman Drewry was interred in Petersburg's historic Blandford Cemetery.

== Elections ==
- 1920; Elected to the U.S. House of Representatives unopposed in a special election, and he won re-election with 92.6% of the vote in the general election, defeating Republican F.L. Mason
- 1922; Re-elected with 86.2% of the vote, defeating Republican Herbert Rogers and Independent W.H. Gill
- 1924; Re-elected unopposed
- 1926; Re-elected unopposed
- 1928; Re-elected unopposed
- 1930; Re-elected unopposed
- 1932; Re-elected as part of the Democratic ticket for Virginia's at-large congressional district; he won 8.2% in a 24-way race
- 1934; Re-elected with 94.4% of the vote, defeating Socialist Dan Killinger and Independent Mary F. Leslie
- 1936; Re-elected with 90.4% of the vote, defeating Republican John Martin and Socialist Killinger
- 1938; Re-elected unopposed
- 1940; Re-elected with 96.0% of the vote, defeating Socialist Cyrus Hotchkiss
- 1942; Re-elected unopposed
- 1944; Re-elected unopposed
- 1946; Re-elected with 87.1% of the vote, defeating Republican Andrew S. Condrey

== See also ==
- List of members of the United States Congress who died in office (1900–1949)

Senate of Virginia
| Preceded by Charles T. Lassiter | Virginia Senator for the 29th District; 1912–1920 | Succeeded by Morton G. Goode |
U.S. House of Representatives
| Preceded by Walter A. Watson | Member of the U.S. House of Representatives from Virginia's 4th congressional district 1920–1933 | Succeeded by District abolished Himself after district re-established in 1935 |
| Preceded by District re-established John S. Wise before district abolished in 1885 | Member of the U.S. House of Representatives from Virginia's at-large congressional district 1933–1935 | Succeeded by District abolished |
| Preceded by District re-established Himself before district abolished in 1933 | Member of the U.S. House of Representatives from Virginia's 4th congressional district 1933–1947 | Succeeded by Watkins M. Abbitt |
