= Zigao =

Zigao (Wade–Giles: Tzu-kao) is a name which may refer to:

== People named Zigao (子高) ==
=== Shang dynasty ===
- Xiao Jia (小甲) (r. 1666–1650 BCE), personal name Zi Gao (子高), the seventh King of the Shang dynasty.

=== Spring and Autumn period ===
- Guo Zigao (国子高), an official of the Qi state in the Spring and Autumn period (771–476 BCE).
- Duke of Ye (叶公) (529–after 479 BCE), courtesy name Zigao (子高), also known as Shen Zhuliang (沈諸梁), general of the Chu state.
- Gongzi Gao (公子高), son of Duke Wen of Jiang Qi and founder of the Gao clan in Qi, grandfather of Gao Xi (fl. 686 BCE).
- Gongzi Qi (公子祁), courtesy name Zigao (子高), son of Duke Hui of Jiang Qi (r. 608–559 BCE).

=== Warring States period ===
- Gongzi Gao (公子高) (fl. 334, 323 BCE), son of King Hui of Wei.
- Kong Chuan (孔穿), courtesy name Zigao (子高), a descendant of Confucius in the Warring States period, possibly a contemporary of Gongsun Long (325–250 BCE).

=== Qin dynasty ===
- Gongzi Gao (公子高) (d. 209 BCE), a son of Qin Shi Huang.

=== Han dynasty ===
- Feng Shang (冯商), courtesy name Zigao (子高), a historian during the reign of Emperor Cheng of Han (r. 51–7 BCE).
- Zhang Chang (張敞) (d. 48 BCE), courtesy name Zigao (子高), Han scholar and official.
- Tang Lin (唐林), courtesy name Zigao (子高), an official during the reign of Emperor Ai of Han (r. 27–1 BCE).
- Liu Hong (劉弘) (fl. 189), courtesy name Zigao (子高), an official of the Eastern Han, appointed as Minister of Works (司空).
- Dong Zhong (董重) (d. 189), courtesy name Zigao (子高), nephew of Empress Dowager Dong, mother of Emperor Ling of Han.

=== Three Kingdoms period ===
- Sun Deng (孫登) (209–241), courtesy name Zigao (子高), the Eastern Wu crown prince.

=== Jin dynasty ===
- Su Jun (蘇峻) (d. 328), courtesy name Zigao (子高), a general of the Eastern Jin dynasty.

=== Southern and Northern dynasties ===
- Xing Kang (邢亢), courtesy name Zigao (子高), son of the Northern Wei official, Xing Yan (478–528).
- Dai Zigao (戴子高), mentioned in Tao Yuanzhen's Yún-Sūn-suí-bǐ and a contemporary of Xiao Lun (507–551), son of Emperor Wu of Liang.
- Han Zigao (韩子高) (538–567), a general of the Chen dynasty.
- Wang Cao (王操), courtesy name Zigao (子高), a prime minister during the reign of Emperor Ming of Western Liang (r. 542–585).

=== Tang dynasty ===
- Zheng Zigao (郑子高), father of the Tang official, Zheng Pei (738–796).

=== Song dynasty ===
- Jia Qiao (郟僑), courtesy name Zigao (子高), son of the Song official, Jia Dan (1038–1103).
- Chen Ke (陳克) (1081–1137), courtesy name Zigao (子高), an official during the reign of Emperor Gaozong of Song.
- Fang Shanjing (方山京), courtesy name Zigao (子高), zhuangyuan (1st ranked Jinshi 進士) in 1262 during the reign of Emperor Lizong of Song.

=== Ming dynasty ===
- Liu Song (劉崧) (1321–1381), courtesy name Zigao (子高), an official during the reign of Hongwu Emperor.
- Lu Zigao (陸子高) (1354–1431), a Ming imperial scholar (Gongshi 貢士) during the reign of Hongwu Emperor.
- Ma Jing (马京) (d. 1411), courtesy name Zigao (子高), a Ming imperial scholar (Jinshi) in 1385.
- Zheng Cen (鄭岑) (b. 1420), courtesy name Zigao (子高), a Ming imperial scholar (Jinshi) in 1454.
- Guo Zigao (郭子高), grandfather of a Ming imperial scholar (Jinshi) in 1475, Guo Shen (1448–1513), and great-grandfather of another in 1517, Guo Xu.
- Sun Sheng (孙升) (1501–1560), courtesy name Zigao (子高) or Zhigao (志高), a Ming imperial scholar (Jinshi) in 1535.
- Li Qiao (李侨) (fl. 1544), courtesy name Zigao (子高), a Ming imperial scholar (Jinshi) in 1544.
- Pan Yigui (潘一桂) (fl. 1559), courtesy name Zigao (子高), a Ming imperial scholar (Jinshi) in 1559.

=== Qing dynasty ===
- Dai Wang (戴望) (1837–1873), courtesy name Zigao (子高), a scholar during the reign of Xianfeng Emperor.

=== Modern China ===
- Zhang Zigao (张子高) (1886–1976), a Hubei-born scientist, professor in Tsinghua University.
- Shen Zigao (沈子高) (1895–1982), an Anglican bishop in Shanxi, China.
- Zhou Zigao (周子高) and Hou Zigao (侯子高), the two soldiers mentioned in 1945 Eighth Route Army Compilation Sequence.
- Ding Zigao (丁子高) (b. 1979), a Hong Kong actor.

== People named Zigao (子羔) ==
- Gao Chai (高柴) (6–5 cc. BCE), courtesy name Zigao (子羔), a disciple of Confucius.
  - Eponymous excavated text from the Shanghai Museum collection.
- Jiang Zigao (姜子羔), a Ming politician and imperial scholar (Jinshi) in 1553, grandson of another imperial scholar in 1502, Jiang Rong.

== People named Zigao (諮皋) ==
- Yu Zigao (俞諮皋) (d. 1628), an admiral and contemporary of Zheng Zhilong.
