= William B. McIlwaine =

American politician

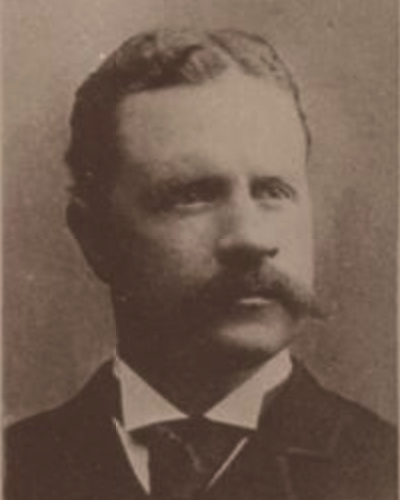

Member of the Virginia Senate from the 29th district
- In office December 6, 1893 – January 10, 1906
- Preceded by: John M. Pleasants
- Succeeded by: Charles T. Lassiter

Member of the Virginia House of Delegates from Petersburg
- In office December 2, 1891 – December 6, 1893 Serving with Edwin M. Clements
- Preceded by: Hugh R. Smith
- Succeeded by: John B. Evans

Personal details
- Born: William Baird McIlwaine; October 4, 1854 Petersburg, Virginia, U.S.
- Died: August 11, 1930 (aged 75) Petersburg, Virginia, U.S.
- Resting place: Blandford Cemetery
- Party: Democratic
- Spouses: Jane Maury Pegram (m. 1877; died 1878); Sarah Joseph Claiborne (m. 1882)
- Education: Hampden–Sydney College

William Baird McIlwaine (October 4, 1854 – August 11, 1930) was an American politician who served in the Virginia House of Delegates and Virginia Senate.
