= Wuxi Christian Church =

- 无锡市基督教堂
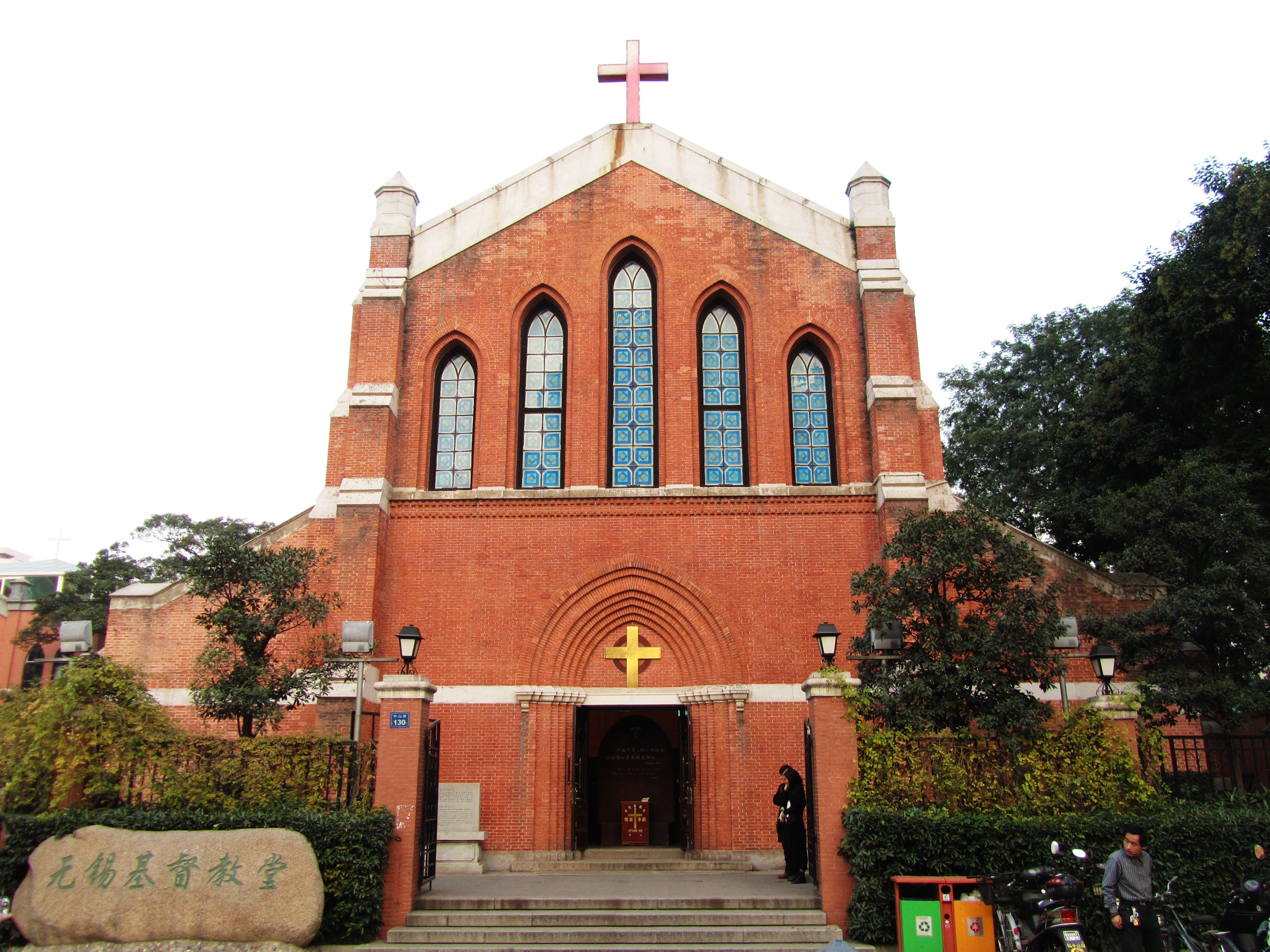
- Wuxi Christian Church.

- Location in Jiangsu. Wuxi Christian Church (China)
- 31.576834°N 120.310547°E
- Location: Liangxi District, Wuxi, Jiangsu
- Country: China
- Denomination: Chinese Protestant
- Previous denomination: Episcopal

History
- Status: Parish church
- Founded: 1915

Architecture
- Functional status: Active
- Architectural type: Church building
- Style: Gothic architecture
- Years built: 1915
- Groundbreaking: 1908
- Completed: 1915

Specifications
- Materials: Bricks

Clergy
- Bishop: Zhang Peifu (张佩富)

Wuxi Christian Church (Chinese: 无锡市基督教堂; pinyin: Wúxīshì Jīdūjiàotáng), formerly Holy Cross Church (Chinese: 聖十字堂; pinyin: Shèng shízì táng), is a Protestant church located in Liangxi District of Wuxi, Jiangsu, China.

== History ==
In 1901, American Episcopal Church Pastor Rev. Cameron Farquhar McRae (Mai Ganlin, 麦甘霖) and Zhu Baoyuan (朱葆元), a Chinese staff of the Episcopal Church, introduced Protestantism to Wuxi and founded the Anglican Church of Wuxi later. Preacher Mu Gaowen (慕高文) bought 26 acres of land here in 1908 to build a church. In 1915 they received a large donation from an American believer and enlarged the church.

In 1958 it was renamed "Wuxi Christian Church". During the Cultural Revolution, it was used as school classrooms. After the 3rd plenary session of the 11th Central Committee of the Chinese Communist Party, according to a policy of some religious freedom, the church was officially reopened to the public in 1980. In January 1994 it was designated as a municipal level cultural relic preservation unit by the local government. The church was inscribed to the Cultural Relics Protection Units List in Jiangsu in March 2019.

== Gallery ==
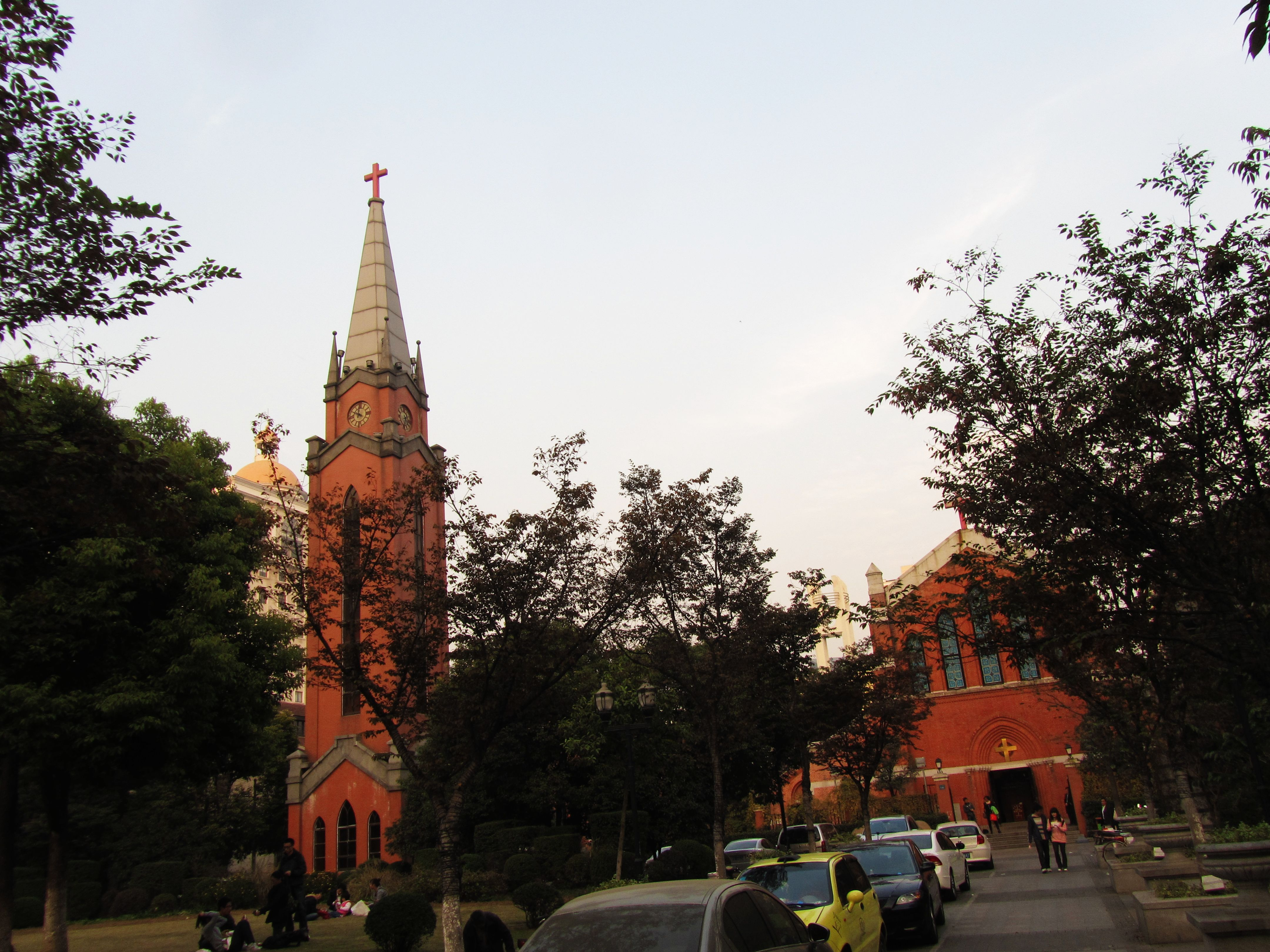
The Bell Tower.

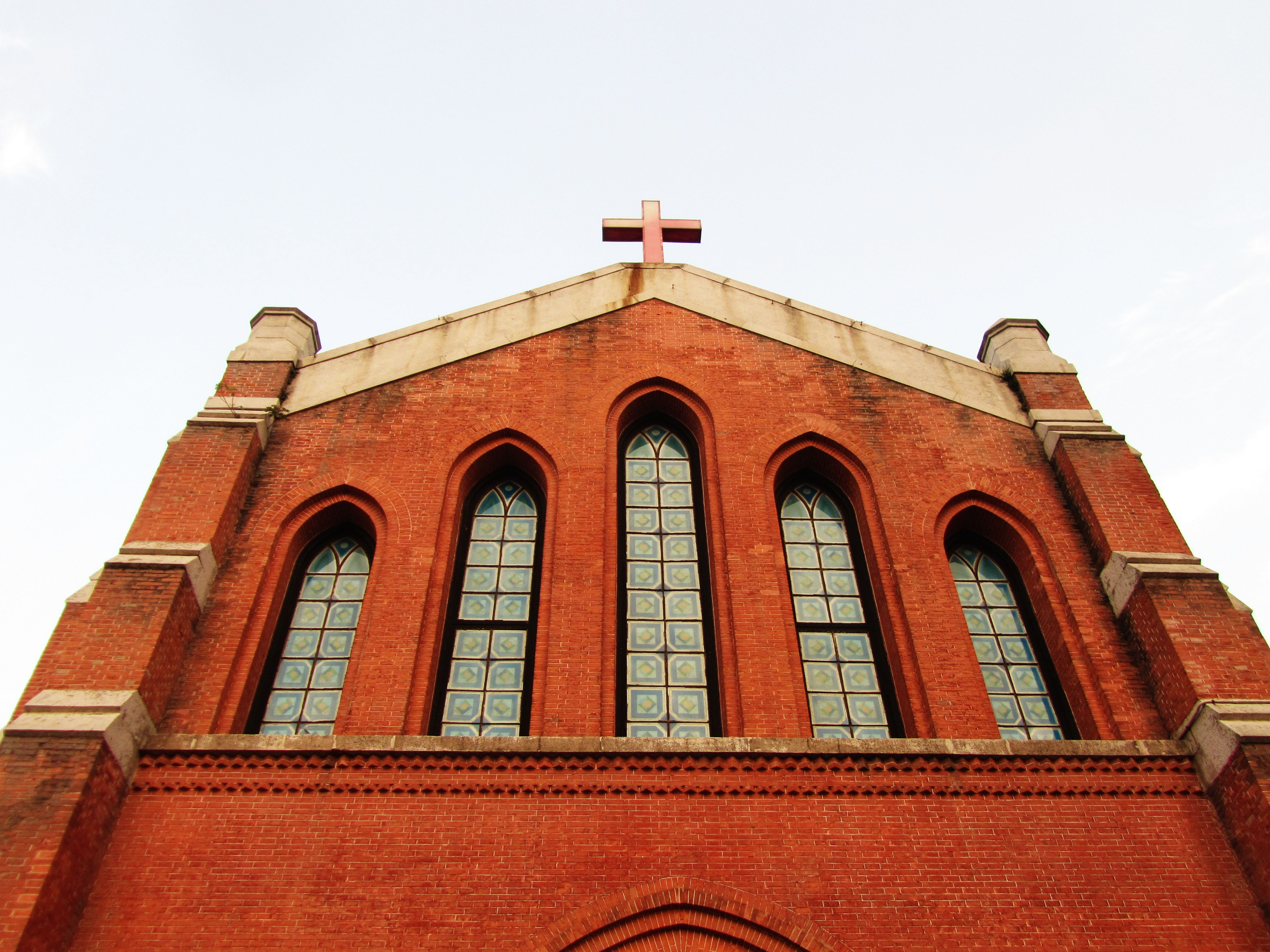
The entrance.

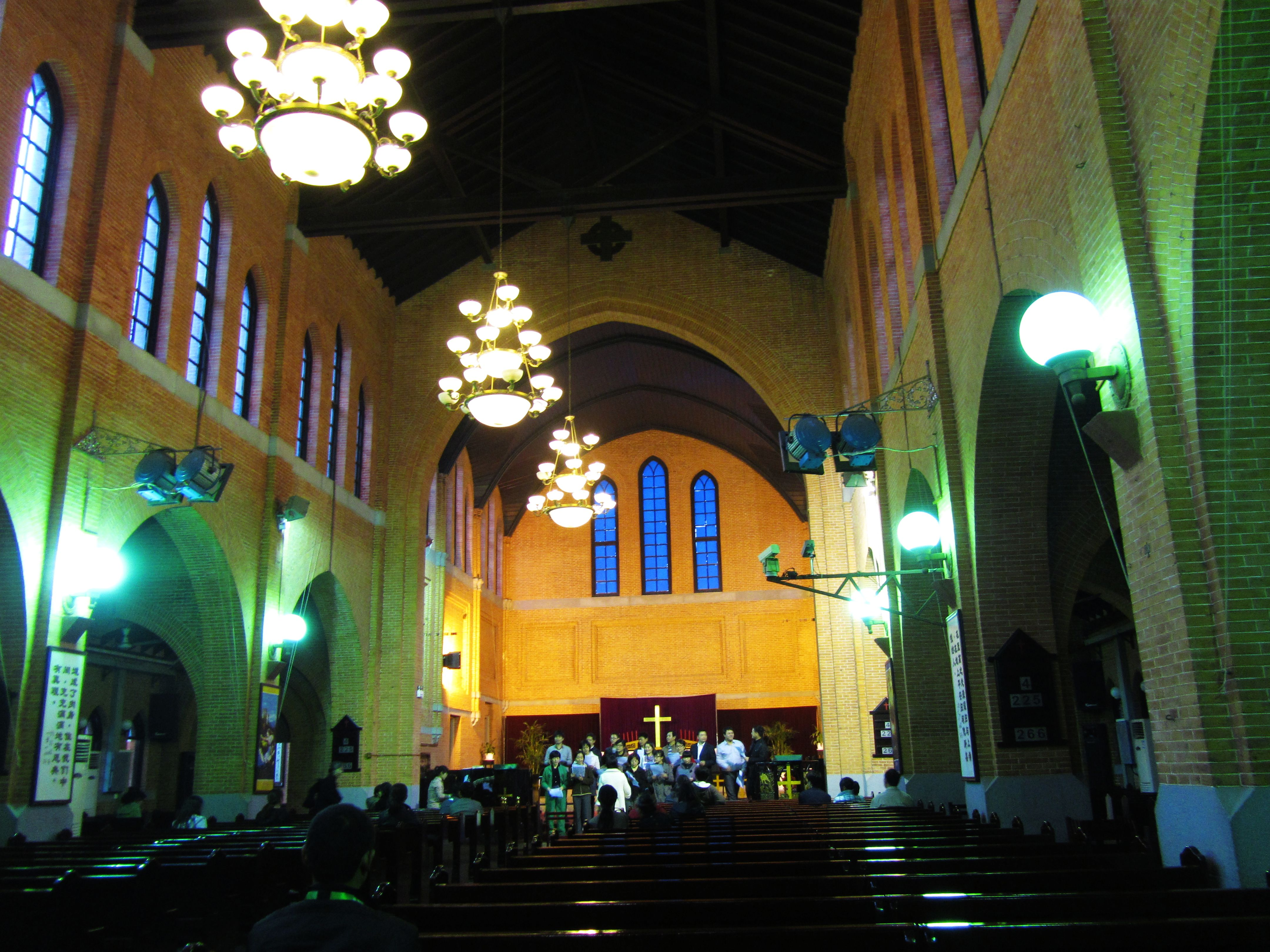
The interior.
