= John Rodney McRae =

American murderer and suspected serial killer

- Born: November 20, 1934; Belleville, Michigan, U.S.
- Died: June 28, 2005 (aged 70); Southern Michigan Correctional Facility, Jackson, Michigan, U.S.
- Conviction: First degree murder (2 counts)
- Penalty: Life imprisonment

Details
- Victims: 2–5+
- Span of crimes: 1950–1987
- Country: United States
- States: Michigan (possibly Florida)
- Date apprehended: October 15, 1997

John Rodney McRae (November 20, 1934 – June 28, 2005) was an American murderer and suspected serial killer. McRae was officially convicted of two sexually motivated murders of young boys, one committed when he was 15, but is the prime suspect in at least three more. He never admitted his guilt and died in prison while serving a life sentence.

== Early life ==
John Rodney McRae was born on November 20, 1934, in the small town of Belleville, Michigan, to John Alexander and Josephine Louise Smith McRae, who also had a younger daughter. In the early 1940s, the family left Michigan and moved to Fort Wayne, Indiana, where McRae attended a military school for some time, before they eventually returned to Michigan in 1946. There, the elder McRae found lodging in suburban St. Clair Shores, where the family earned a positive reputation for leading law-abiding, honest lives. McRae went to the Lakeview High School, where he mainly engaged in sports and was on the football team, but by this time, he also started to engage in small-time crime. In 1948, McRae and a friend ran away from home, for which missing persons reports were filed, only to later be found in an auto repair shop in Fort Wayne, Indiana, where McRae had been working as a day laborer. By the age of 15, he was 5'2" and weighed 90 pounds, but was unpopular in school and the neighborhood because of his aggressive and disruptive behavior towards other children and students. As a result, McRae was frequently disciplined by the school administration, and earned a reputation as a bully.

During this period, he also stole money from his parents and other people's property such as cars and boats, and even more disturbingly, he dissected a dog near the family home. McRae also began to exhibit signs of an apparent sexual disorder, as he started assaulting and sexually harassing children of both sexes who were significantly younger than him.

== Murder of Joseph Housey ==
In early September 1950, 8-year-old Joseph "Joey" Housey Jr. went missing from St. Clair Shores. A search operation was organized by police and local residents, who found the boy's mutilated body in a lovers' lane only two blocks away from his house on September 23. Housey's jugular vein and carotid artery, as well as blood vessels on both wrists, had been slashed with a dull paring knife, after which he had been hit on the head several times with a rock. The body had then been buried in a shallow grave with a small concrete slab, which had been washed away by rain over the following days, allowing the grave to be located. A forensic autopsy concluded that Housey had been sexually abused.

McRae lived near the Houseys and was among the volunteers who assisted the police in the search. Like most local teenagers, he was interrogated by the officers as part of procedure, but quickly became a suspect after he alleged that he "accidentally" discovered the location of a beam headlight Housey had been playing with the day he disappeared. McRae was unable to provide an alibi as to his whereabouts on the day of the disappearance, after which law enforcement officers showed up at his home with an offer that he undergo a polygraph test. However, McRae had fled the day before, leaving behind a note addressed to his mother which read ""I want you to know I hart nothing to do with the Housey boy. I love you and I've caused you too much trouble."

During a search of the house, the officers found a razor stained with dried blood amongst McRae's belongings, which was seized for forensic examination. He was considered missing for a few days before being located in the Canadian city of Sarnia, where his uncle resided. McRae was returned to St. Clair Shores' police station, where he confessed to killing Housey during interrogations on October 1, 1950. However, he refused to admit to raping the victim and was unwilling to explain his motive for the murder, claiming that it had occurred to him in a dream. McRae also stated that shortly before he escaped, he had confessed the killing to his mother and father, who later confirmed this claim. His father later told the policemen that after his son had informed him of the deed, he said the following to him: "If you did do it, you better go out to the lake and start swimming. Its better that way. Remember son, I'm only asking you to swim if you are guilty." According to McRae's father's testimony, after a brief conversation with his son, he shook his hand, asked him to write a letter after his arrival in Canada, and walked him to the coast. McRae later testified that he managed to swim some distance from shore, but was soon forced to turn back due to fatigue, after which he stole a neighbor's motorboat and fled to Sarnia.

In the months that followed, McRae recanted his testimony and declared himself insane. At the request of his attorney, a psychiatric exam was conducted in late October of that year, which found him to be completely sane and aware of his actions. On February 21, 1951, by a jury verdict, McRae was found guilty of killing Joseph Housey, and on February 29, the court imposed a sentence of life imprisonment without parole. During his sentencing, McRae remained calm and showed little to no emotion, and later refused to say anything to the court when the judge asked him. Later on, when reporters asked him for comments, he simply said: "I'm disgusted, that's all."

== Commutation, release and suspected murders ==
Following his conviction, McRae was transferred to the Michigan Reformatory in Ionia, where he learned the trade of an auto mechanic and underwent several sex offender rehabilitation programs. During his incarceration, he never exhibited violent tendencies, was never disciplined and was considered a model prisoner. In 1971, after a series of decisions by the Supreme Court questioned the imposition of the death penalty and life without parole on juvenile offenders, Governor William Milliken commuted McRae's sentence to life imprisonment with a chance of parole by executive order. McRae was paroled from prison on February 2, 1972, after spending 21 years behind bars. He then moved to Crystal, Michigan with his mother where, with the support of his mother, he soon found housing and work. In 1973, he married Barbara Ann Heckman, who gave birth to his son Martin in 1974. The following year, McRae was finally allowed to leave Michigan, moving to Brevard County, Florida, to work as a guard at a juvenile detention facility. One theory purports that McRae provided fake documents that concealed his criminal record upon entering the institution.

For the remainder of his stay in Florida, McRae came under police suspicion several times in connection with the disappearances of local children. On April 28, 1977, 13-year-old Keith Fleming vanished from Cocoa Beach after last being seen on the highway near a beach, just a few hundred yards from McRae's house. While McRae was questioned regarding the case, he was never arrested as no direct evidence indicated his responsibility. Fleming's body was never found.

Two years later, McRae came under police scrutiny again after 12-year-old Kipling Randolph Hess III disappeared. Hess was last seen alive on March 27, 1979, walking on his way to school in the Merritt Island area. However, he never showed up to class that day, and was declared missing. Upon leaving home, the boy left a note addressed to his parents that read "Goodbye, Mom and Dad." During the investigation, McRae became the main and only suspect in his disappearance, as it was determined that he and his son Martin had met Hess at a Catholic church carnival a few days prior to his disappearance. As in the Housey case, McRae joined the volunteer searches and assisted police in the search right up to the time he became a suspect. After the search ended, McRae was questioned while his apartment and the interior of his car were searched. Despite this, no evidence implicating him in Hess's disappearance was uncovered, and Hess remains missing. His body has never been found.

On December 12, 1979, there was an escape from the Brevard Correctional Institution in Sharpes, where McRae worked. It was orchestrated by a 20-year-old inmate named Charles Edward Collingwood, who was serving a four-year sentence for stealing an automobile, but due to his immaculate prison record, he was put in the minimum security section. On the afternoon of December 12, Collingwood was doing landscaping work outside the facility with minimal security personnel, and used his chance to escape. Circumstantial evidence established that McRae may have been involved in the escape. A number of informants told the prison authorities that McRae had been sexually harassing Collingwood for several months, after which Collingwood started blackmailing and threatening to expose him. McRae denied having any inappropriate relations with the prisoner since, according to his testimony, Collingwood himself had been an informant and had given him information about other prisoners' activities. Collingwood was never found. The investigators suspected that Collingwood was murdered by McRae once he was outside, but ultimately, no charges were filed against him due to lack of evidence.

In 1980, McRae was forced to resign from his job, after which he left Florida and returned to Michigan, settling in Clare County, where he purchased a trailer and set it up on a leased piece of land.

== Murder of Randy Laufer and capture ==
In 1987, McRae came under police attention again, in the disappearance of 15-year-old Randy Laufer on September 15. The teenager was a close friend of McRae's son and had even visited his trailer a few times. McRae was questioned, but at the time, no evidence implicating him was found. Months after Laufer vanished, McRae and his family left Michigan and moved to Mesa, Arizona.

In August 1997, Clinton Goodenow, a hired hand who was digging a hole to get rid of junk on McRae's property, found the skeletal remains of what appeared to be a young boy. The skeleton was sent to the county coroner, who soon identified it as belonging to Randy Laufer. Based on the chipped bones on the spine, neck and pelvis, the examiner stated that the victim had been tortured before his death and had been repeatedly stabbed with a knife in various places. Using the bones as evidence, the 63-year-old McRae and his son were arrested in Mesa on October 15. Martin was subsequently released.

== Trial and imprisonment ==
McRae's trial began in September 1998. Since there was no forensic evidence to incriminate him in Laufer's murder, prosecutors used evidence from the Housey trial, arguing that both cases showed a similar modus operandi. In both cases, McRae was the last person seen with the victim and was involved in the searches, while both victims had numerous cuts on their bodies and were found buried near McRae's home.

McRae was convicted of killing Laufer in December 1998, and was sentenced to life imprisonment without parole. His attorneys appealed the decision on the grounds that McRae had been provided ineffective assistance counsel, which the court granted. In the meantime, Martin McRae was convicted for molesting his daughter in Nevada, for which he was given a 10-years-to-life sentence.

In 2004, McRae's conviction was overturned and he was given a new trial, which began on May 3, 2005. Again, he was found guilty, and was re-sentenced to life imprisonment without parole.

== Death ==
In the early 2000s, McRae began having health problems, eventually being diagnosed with a stomach ulcer. On June 28, 2005, just thirteen days after the conclusion of his retrial, he died from complications relating to his ailment at the Southern Michigan Correctional Facility in Jackson.

== See also ==
- List of homicides in Michigan
- List of youngest killers
