= Charles T. Lassiter =

American judge and politician

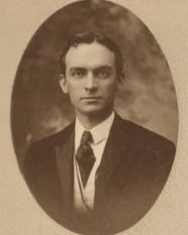
- Official portrait, 1908

Member of the Virginia Senate from the 29th district
- In office January 10, 1906 – January 10, 1912
- Preceded by: William B. McIlwaine
- Succeeded by: Patrick H. Drewry

Member of the Virginia House of Delegates from the Petersburg district
- In office December 4, 1901 – January 13, 1904 Serving with Richard B. Davis
- Preceded by: William P. McRae
- Succeeded by: John Watson

Commonwealth's Attorney for Petersburg
- In office June 1896 – May 12, 1898
- Preceded by: William H. Jones
- Succeeded by: Francis R. Lassiter

Personal details
- Born: Charles Trotter Lassiter; January 30, 1870 Petersburg, Virginia, U.S.
- Died: March 17, 1930 (aged 60) Richmond, Virginia, U.S.
- Resting place: Blandford Cemetery
- Party: Democratic
- Spouse: Sallie Hamilton
- Relatives: Francis R. Lassiter (brother); William Lassiter (brother)
- Education: University of Virginia (LLB)
- Occupation: Lawyer; politician; judge

Military service
- Branch/service: United States Army; U.S. Volunteers
- Years of service: 1898
- Rank: Second lieutenant
- Unit: A. P. Hill Rifles
- Battles/wars: Spanish–American War

Charles Trotter Lassiter (January 30, 1870 – March 17, 1930) was a judge and state legislator in Virginia. He served in the Virginia House of Delegates and the Virginia Senate.

Lassiter graduated from the University of Virginia Law School. Lassiter served in the Virginia House of Delegates from 1901 to 1904. He served in the Virginia Senate from 1906 to 1911. Duke University has a collection his family's papers.

He died March 17, 1930, in hospital after a long illness and was survived by his wife and two daughters.
