= Robert G. Southall =

American politician

Robert Goode Southall

Member of the U.S. House of Representatives from Virginia's 4th district
- In office March 4, 1903 – March 3, 1907
- Preceded by: Francis R. Lassiter
- Succeeded by: Francis R. Lassiter

Member of the Virginia House of Delegates from Nottoway and Amelia Counties
- In office 1900–1903
- Preceded by: James Mann
- Succeeded by: Henry Lee

Personal details
- Born: December 26, 1852 Amelia Court House, Virginia
- Died: May 25, 1924 (aged 71) Baltimore, Maryland
- Resting place: Amelia Cemetery, Amelia Court House, Virginia
- Party: Democratic
- Education: University of Virginia
- Profession: lawyer, judge

Robert Goode Southall (December 26, 1852 – May 25, 1924), was an American politician and lawyer, noteworthy as the U.S. representative from Virginia.

== Biography ==
Born at Amelia Court House, Virginia, Southall attended the Washington Academy and High School of Amelia County, and was Deputy Clerk of Nottoway County in 1873 and 1874.

Southall graduated from the law department of the University of Virginia at Charlottesville in 1876. He was admitted to the bar in 1877, and commenced practice at Amelia Court House. He later served as prosecuting attorney for Amelia County, Virginia, from 1884 to 1902.

Southall served as delegate to the Democratic National Conventions in 1888 and 1896, and served as member of the Virginia House of Delegates from 1899 to 1904. He was elected as a Democrat to the Fifty-eighth and Fifty-ninth Congresses (March 4, 1903 – March 3, 1907).

He then resumed the practice of law in Amelia County, Virginia, and served as a judge of the fourth judicial circuit court of Virginia from January 1912, until his death in Baltimore, Maryland, May 25, 1924 (aged 71).

Southall was interred in Amelia Cemetery, Amelia Court House, Virginia.

== Electoral history ==
- 1902; Southall was elected to the U.S. House of Representatives with 90.16% of the vote, defeating Independent R.T. Vaughan and Republican Thomas A. Jones.
- 1904; Southall was re-elected with 82.85% of the vote, defeating Republican Charles Alexander.

== Sources ==
- United States Congress. "Robert G. Southall (id: S000684)". Biographical Directory of the United States Congress.

U.S. House of Representatives
Preceded by Francis R. Lassiter	Member of the U.S. House of Representatives from Virginia's 4th congressional district 1903–1907	Succeeded by Francis R. Lassiter
