= Walter A. Watson =

American politician

Member of the U.S. House of Representatives from Virginia's 4th district
- In office March 4, 1913 – December 24, 1919
- Preceded by: Robert Turnbull
- Succeeded by: Patrick H. Drewry

Member of the Virginia Senate from the 28th district
- In office December 2, 1891 – December 4, 1895
- Preceded by: J. R. Rawlings
- Succeeded by: Robert Turnbull

Personal details
- Born: Walter Allen Watson; November 25, 1867 Nottoway County, Virginia
- Died: December 24, 1919 (aged 52) Washington, D.C.
- Resting place: "Woodland," Nottoway County, Virginia
- Party: Democratic
- Education: Hampden-Sydney College; University of Virginia
- Profession: lawyer, judge

Walter Allen Watson (November 25, 1867 – December 24, 1919) was a Virginia lawyer and Democratic politician who served in the Virginia Senate and the United States House of Representatives.

== Early and family life ==
The first child born after the Civil War to former Confederate Cavalryman Meredith Watson (1841-1893) (of Lunenburg County and Company E of 3rd Virginia Cavalry) and his wife, the former Josephine Leonora Robertson of Nottoway County, Virginia. Watson was born in 1867 at Woodland plantation near Jennings Ordinary (unlike 3 other homes of the same name in the county), which and his paternal grandparents (Robert A.A. Watson and his wife Mary) had bought from the Dupuy family in 1852. In fact, his great-grandfather Watson had been named a Colonel for Prince Edward County militiamen by then Virginia Governor Thomas Jefferson, and fought in the American Revolutionary War. Both grandparents lived with the young farming family in 1870. The large family (13 children) lost many members in childhood, at least four in 1889 alone. Two younger brothers survived to adulthood, farmed and lived with Watson and their widowed mother at the turn of the century—Meredith Leon Watson and Henry Hunter Watson—as did many sisters (at least one a schoolteacher) and another small family. His maternal grandfather, a Nottoway County plantation owner, and possibly of higher social status than the Watsons, had been killed by a slave in 1847, the year of her birth (but her mother remarried, to George Daniel Horner who joined the 18th Virginia Infantry in 1864 as a private), and her 16-year-old brother died fighting for the Confederacy at the Battle of Williamsburg in May 1862. W.A. Watson attended an "old field" school, then Hampden-Sydney College (where one of his elder brother in laws taught) and graduated in 1887. He studied law at the University of Virginia in Charlottesville in 1888 and 1889.

== Career ==
Admitted to the bar in 1893, Watson began his legal practice in Nottoway and adjoining counties.

=== Early political career ===
Watson aligned with the Martin organization and later with the Byrd Organization. He won election to the Senate of Virginia, and served in that part-time position from 1891 to 1895 (the youngest member of that body those years), then won election as his county's Commonwealth's Attorney and served from 1895 to 1904.

During 1901 and 1902, during the Virginia Constitutional Convention of 1902 of which he was a member and unsuccessfully argued against restricting voting for blacks and poor whites, Watson also was a member of the Democratic state committee.

Legislators elected him a state judge for the 4th judicial circuit, and he served from 1904 to 1912, when he resigned upon being elected to Congress. Judge R.G. Southall succeeded him.

=== Congress ===
In 1912, Watson defeated incumbent Independent Robert Turnbull (of Lawrenceville in Brunswick County) and won election as a Democrat to the 63rd Congress and to the three succeeding Congresses, serving from March 4, 1913, until his death in Washington, D.C., December 24, 1919. In the 65th Congress, Watson served as chairman of the Committee on Elections. Early in Watson's life, Nottoway County had become an important railroad stop halfway between Petersburg and Danville, and his Congressional successor, Patrick H. Drewry, was a Petersburg-based lawyer and former state senator.

== Death and legacy ==
Watson died of mastoiditis in Washington DC in 1919 at the age of 52. He was survived by his widow and sons. He was interred in the family cemetery on Woodland estate. He had been an amateur historian, and had thought of retiring to finish his historical and natural history reminiscences.

With the assistance of the Virginia State Library, his wife edited his notes, which the state in 1925 published as Notes on Southside Virginia, and which were republished by Genealogical Publishing in 1977, so are not freely available online.

== Electoral history ==
- 1912; Watson was elected to the U.S. House of Representatives with 96.41% of the vote, defeating Socialist Fred Herzig and Independent Robert Turnbull.
- 1914; Watson was re-elected with 96.17% of the vote, defeating Socialist Herzig.
- 1916; Watson was re-elected unopposed.
- 1918; Watson was re-elected unopposed.

== See also ==
- List of members of the United States Congress who died in office (1900–1949)

== Sources ==
- United States Congress. "Walter A. Watson (id: W000206)". Biographical Directory of the United States Congress.

U.S. House of Representatives
| Preceded by Robert Turnbull | Member of the U.S. House of Representatives from Virginia's 4th congressional district 1913-1919 | Succeeded by Patrick H. Drewry |
