= Robert Turnbull (American politician) =

American politician

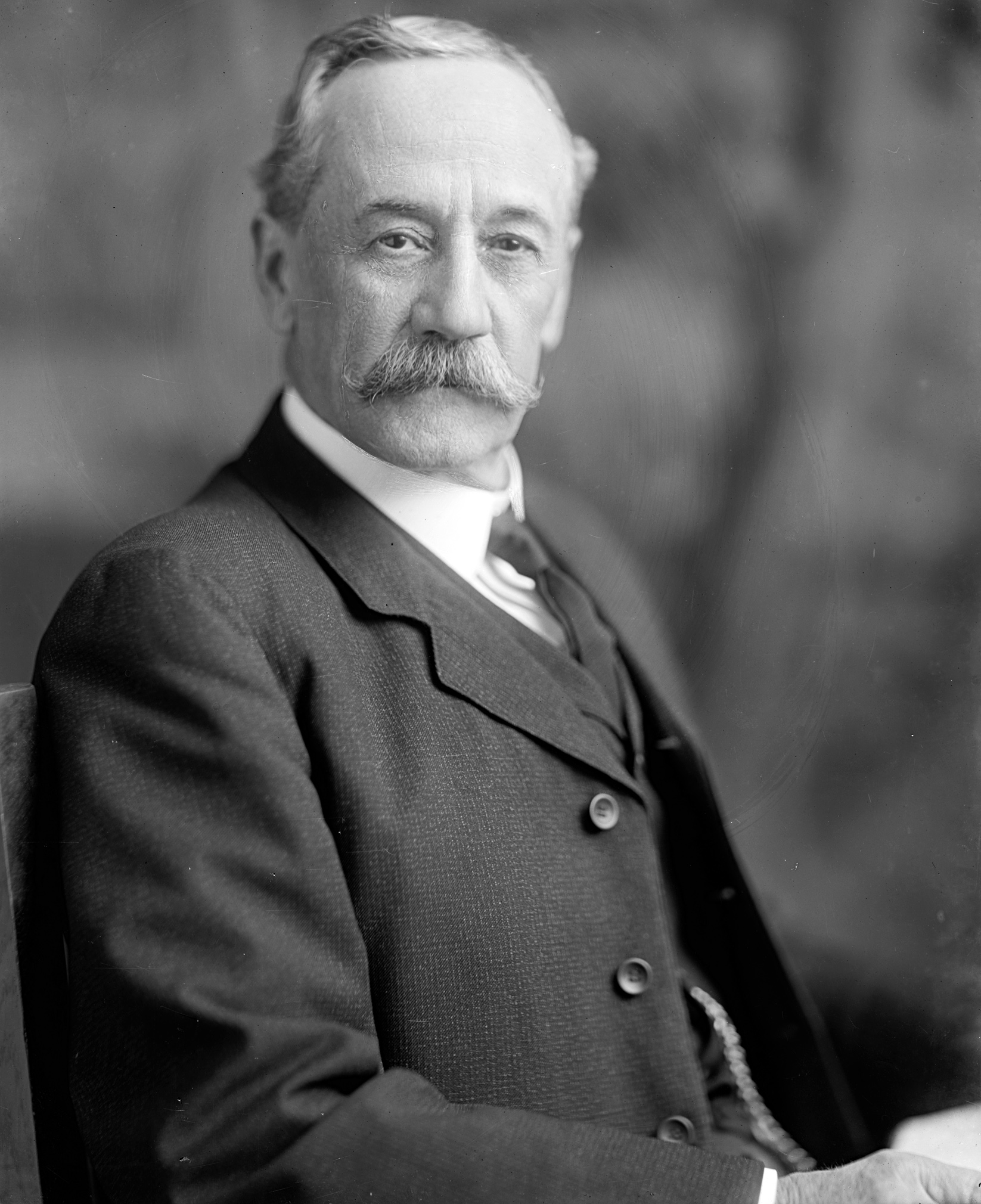

Member of the U.S. House of Representatives from Virginia's 4th district
- In office March 8, 1910 – March 3, 1913
- Preceded by: Francis R. Lassiter
- Succeeded by: Walter A. Watson

Member of the Virginia Senate from the 28th district
- In office December 4, 1895 – December 6, 1899
- Preceded by: Walter A. Watson
- Succeeded by: William Hodges Mann

Personal details
- Born: January 11, 1850 Lawrenceville, Virginia
- Died: January 22, 1920 (aged 70) Lawrenceville, Virginia
- Resting place: Lawrenceville Cemetery, Lawrenceville, Virginia
- Party: Democratic
- Education: University of Virginia
- Profession: lawyer

Robert Turnbull (January 11, 1850 – January 22, 1920) was an American lawyer and politician aligned with the Democratic Party who served as the clerk of his native Brunswick County, Virginia, as well as state senator (1895-1899) and two terms as a Congressman from Virginia (1910 to 1913).

== Early and family life ==
Born in Lawrenceville, the historic Brunswick County seat, to the former Elizabeth Harrison (1830-1864) and her lawyer husband Edward Randolph Turnbull (1822-1885). He was named for a lawyer uncle who lived with his family nearby, and another uncle, Charles Turnbull, also lived and farmed with his family nearby. His father owned 15 enslaved people in 1850, and 20 in 1860. The family included a younger brother Dr. Edward Randolph Turnbull (1856-1935) and at least four sisters who married: Mary M T Patterson (1851-1921), Annie H.T. Wheler (1858-1903), Sarah Jane T. Hardy-Claiborne (1861-1945) and Fannie T. May (1864-1947).

Turnbull received a private education appropriate to his class at Rock Spring Academy, and graduated from the law department of the University of Virginia at Charlottesville in 1871.

== Career ==
Admitted to the bar in 1871, Turnbull began his legal practice in Lawrenceville, and adjoining counties. He won election as clerk of Brunswick County, and served for a decade, from 1891 to 1910. During this period, Turnbull also won election to represent Brunswick and adjoining counties in the Senate of Virginia, and served from 1894 to 1898. Brunswick County voters also elected him as delegate to the Virginia Constitutional Convention of 1902. Turnbull was also a delegate to the Democratic National Conventions in 1896 and 1904.

=== Congress ===
Following the death of Francis R. Lassiter, Turnbull won election as a Democrat to the Sixty-first Congress to fill the vacancy. He won reelection once, to the Sixty-second Congress and served from March 8, 1910, to March 3, 1913. Judge Walter A. Watson of Nottoway County (who unlike Turnbull had voted against restricting voting by blacks and poor whites) defeated Turnbull in the Democratic primary in 1912.

== Personal life ==
He married Mary Louise Harrison (1856-1916) on December 17, 1874, and they had at least two sons—Edward Randolph Turnbull Jr. (1875-1922) and George Harrison Turnbull (1878-1947) and a daughter Sallie Turnbull Starke (1880-1953)

=== Later career and death ===
Turnbull resumed his legal practice in Lawrenceville, and again won election as clerk of the circuit court of Brunswick County, serving from 1916 until his death on January 22, 1920.

== Death and legacy ==
He was interred in Lawrenceville Cemetery, Lawrenceville, Virginia.

== Electoral history ==
- 1910; Turnbull was elected to the U.S. House of Representatives unopposed in a special election and was re-elected in the general election unopposed.
- 1912; Turnbull lost his re-election bid.

U.S. House of Representatives
Preceded by Francis R. Lassiter	Member of the U.S. House of Representatives from Virginia's 4th congressional district 1910–1913	Succeeded by Walter A. Watson
