= Donald MacRae =

Donald MacRae may refer to:

- Donald MacRae (astronomer) (1916–2006), Canadian astronomer
- Donald MacRae (singer) (1941–2026), Scottish Gaelic folk singer
- Donald Gunn MacRae (1921–1997), British sociologist

== See also ==
- Donald McRae (disambiguation)
