= St. John's Church (Savannah, Georgia) =

Episcopal church in Savannah, Georgia

Coordinates: 32.07359°N 81.09477°W

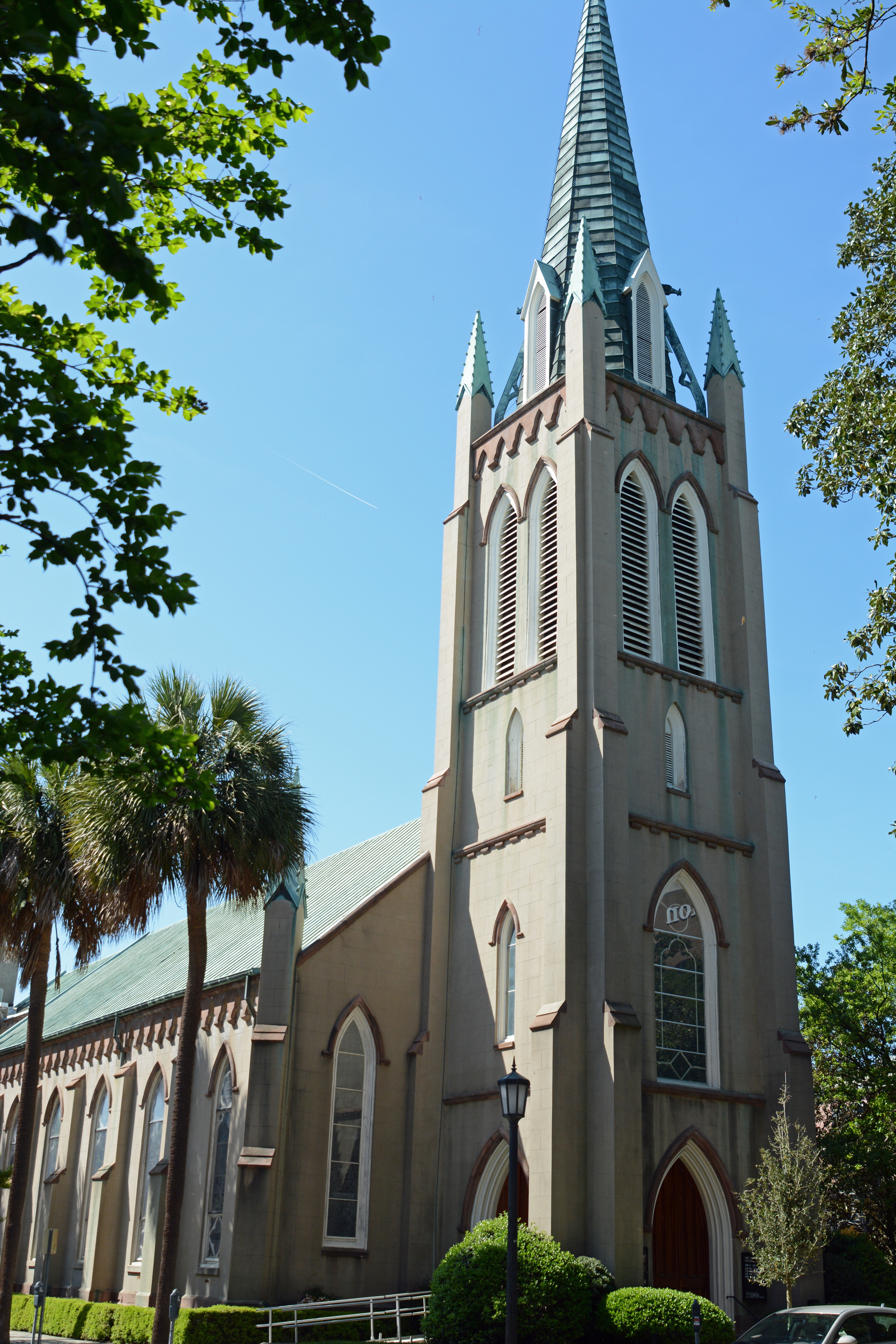
St. John's Episcopal Church

St. John's Church in Savannah is a parish of the Episcopal Diocese of Georgia.

The church was formed in 1841 from the growing Christ Church, Savannah, as part of a plan to increase Episcopal presence in Georgia and to provide for a first bishop of the diocese. One of its founders was local businessman Edward Padelford. After his death in 1870, his name was added to one of the church's stained-glass windows. Eleven other windows are also dedicated to notable early members of the church.

In addition to his Episcopal duties, the bishop would be rector of both St. John's and Christ Church. Stephen Elliott, Jr. was consecrated as Bishop of Georgia in February 1841.

St. John's first building was consecrated in 1843. When the congregation outgrew this building, the construction was undertaken of the current building (which is situated in Madison Square, across from the historic Green-Meldrim House, now the church's parish house). The building was designed by Calvin N. Otis of Buffalo, New York, and was consecrated in May 1853.

The Parish continues to use the 1928 Book of Common Prayer, as the basis for worship. St. John's maintains a cordial relationship with the Episcopal Diocese of Georgia, although the character of the congregation is more traditional than most of the parishes in The Episcopal Church (TEC).

It is included in the Savannah Historic District.

== Rectors ==
Rector	Timespan
Stephen Elliott, Jr.	1841–1845
Rufus M. White	1845–1853
George H. Clark	1853–1861
Cameron Farquhar McRae	1862–1867
Samuel Benedict	1867–1877
Charles Hall Strong	1878–1914
William T. Dakin	1914–1923
William Aimison Jonnard	1924–1929
Charles C. J. Carpenter	1929–1936
Ernest Risley	1936–1965
Paul W. Pritchartt	1970–1973
William H. Ralston, Jr.	1974–1998
Michael L. Carreker	1998–2006
Gavin G. Dunbar	2006–present
