= Donald McRae =

Donald McRae may refer to:

- Don McRae (cricketer) (1914–1986), New Zealand cricketer and football (soccer) international
- Don McRae (politician) (born 1969/1970), Canadian politician
- Donald McRae (Australian cricketer) (1873-1940), Australian cricketer
- Donald McRae (author) (born 1961), South African sports writer
- Donald Malcolm McRae (born 1944), Canadian legal scholar

== See also ==
- Donald MacRae (disambiguation)
