= William Plummer McRae =

American politician and lawyer (died 1901)

Member of the Virginia House of Delegates from the Petersburg district
- In office December 6, 1899 – July 26, 1901 Serving with Thomas B. Ivey
- Preceded by: William Henry Mann
- Succeeded by: Charles T. Lassiter and Richard B. Davis
- In office December 6, 1893 – March 4, 1898 Serving with John B. Evans and Thomas B. Ivey
- Preceded by: Edwin M. Clements and William B. Mellwaine
- Succeeded by: William Henry Mann

Personal details
- Born: 1863 or 1864 Warrenton, North Carolina, U.S.
- Died: July 26, 1901 Nags Head, North Carolina, U.S.
- Parent: Cameron Farquhar McRae (father)
- Relatives: Cameron Farquhar McRae (brother)
- Education: University of Virginia School of Law (LLB)
- Occupation: Politician; lawyer

William Plummer McRae (1863/1864 – July 26, 1901) was an American politician and lawyer from Virginia. He served as a member of the Virginia House of Delegates, representing Petersburg, for three terms, until his death.

== Early life ==
William Plummer McRae was born in 1863 or 1864 in Warrenton, North Carolina, to Susan (née Plummer) and Cameron F. McRae. His father was rector at All Hallows Parish in Anne Arundel County, Maryland. He lived in Anne Arundel County until his father's death and then the family moved to North Carolina. He received his early education in Warrenton, Chapel Hill and McCabe's University School in Petersburg, Virginia. McRae passed the examination for West Point, but was rejected for being under the required age.

In 1881, McRae attended the University of Virginia School of Law for one year. He then taught at McCabe's School for two years before returning to the University of Virginia and graduating after another year of study with a Bachelor of Laws.

== Career ==
After graduating, McRae worked as a lawyer in Petersburg. He served as vice president and general counsel of the Petersburg Banking and Trust Company. He also served as a clerk of the school board in Petersburg.

McRae served as a member of the Virginia House of Delegates, representing Petersburg, from December 6, 1893, to March 4, 1898. He then served from December 6, 1899, to his death. He served on the committee of the American Bar Association on the Uniformity of Laws. At the time of his death, he was chairman of the committee on Courts of Justice.

== Personal life ==
His brother was Cameron Farquhar McRae.

McRae drowned on July 26, 1901, while attempting to rescue a boy in the water at Nags Head, North Carolina.
