= Donald McRae (Australian cricketer) =

Australian cricketer

Personal information
- Born: 13 June 1873; Aldinga, South Australia
- Died: 22 October 1940 (aged 67); Prospect, South Australia
- Source: Cricinfo, 19 August 2020

Donald McRae (13 June 1873 – 22 October 1940) was an Australian cricketer. He played in three first-class matches for South Australia in 1906/07.

== See also ==
- List of South Australian representative cricketers
