= Edwin M. Clements =

American journalist and politician

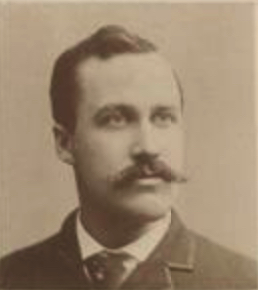
- Clements in 1891

Member of the Virginia House of Delegates from Petersburg
- In office December 4, 1889 – December 6, 1893
- Preceded by: Robert McCandlish Jr.
- Succeeded by: William Plummer McRae

Personal details
- Born: Edwin Manie Clements; October 11, 1863
- Died: March 7, 1920 (aged 56)
- Party: Democratic
- Spouse: Mary Tierney

Edwin Manie Clements (October 11, 1863 – March 7, 1920) was an American journalist and politician who served in the Virginia House of Delegates.
