= Michigan Reformatory =

Prison in Ionia, Ionia County, Michigan

Coordinates: 42°58′32″N 85°05′35″W

Michigan Reformatory (RMI)
- Interactive map of Michigan Reformatory (RMI)
- Location: 1342 W Main Street Ionia, Michigan
- Status: Closed
- Security class: mixed
- Capacity: 1149
- Opened: reopened Nov 2007
- Closed: Nov 2022
- Managed by: Michigan Department of Corrections

The Michigan Reformatory was a state prison for men located in Ionia, Ionia County, Michigan, owned and operated by the Michigan Department of Corrections. The facility has 352 beds at Level II security and 797 beds at Level IV security.

The Reformatory was first opened in 1877 and housed "high-risk offenders". It closed in 2000 with the opening of the nearby Bellamy Creek Correctional Facility, then was reopened in 2007. A Michigan House Appropriation Subcommittee recommended its closure again in 2012. The Michigan Reformatory closed in November 2022 as inmate numbers continue to decline. Inmates were spread around the area and relocated.

== Garrett Heyns ==
Garrett Heyns (1891-1969) was appointed warden of the Ionia Michigan Reformatory by Michigan Governor Frank Murphy as part of the administration's reorganization of Michigan's prison system. The reform efforts included passage of the 1937 Corrections Act which established the Michigan Department of Corrections. Heyns helped transform the Michigan Reformatory. His emphasis was on education and vocational training as a means of reforming prisoners' character. More can be learned about Garrett Heyns by perusing the "Garrett Heyns Collection, 1913-1991" (Collection 348) in Heritage Hall at Calvin University in Grand Rapids Michigan.

Heyns highlights several points about the history of the Ionia prison in his personal diary on Oct. 6, 1937:

"I am the 13th Warden, really the 11th since one named Walker served twice. Reason for starting here was the availability of a spring of water. First prisoners came in Aug 20, 1877. Original name State House of Correction. Changed in 1901 to Michigan Reformatory. Population at height in Mar, 1929-2200. Normal Capacity is 1148. They at one time took out the cells and put in a dormitory system. Changed later again the cell blocks. Aug. 28, 1926 was the big break, 25 escaped. Present cell blocks were built in 1929. Capacity 1050 cells."

== 1981 Riot ==
On the night of May 22, 1981 a riot broke out at a cellblock housing about 500 inmates. 100 corrections officers and state police contained the inmates with tear gas. Three or four corrections officers were reported slightly injured in the disturbance, which began about 8:10 P.M. Arson, looting and vandalism, began shortly after damaging 30 buildings.
