= Francis R. Lassiter =

American politician (1866–1909)

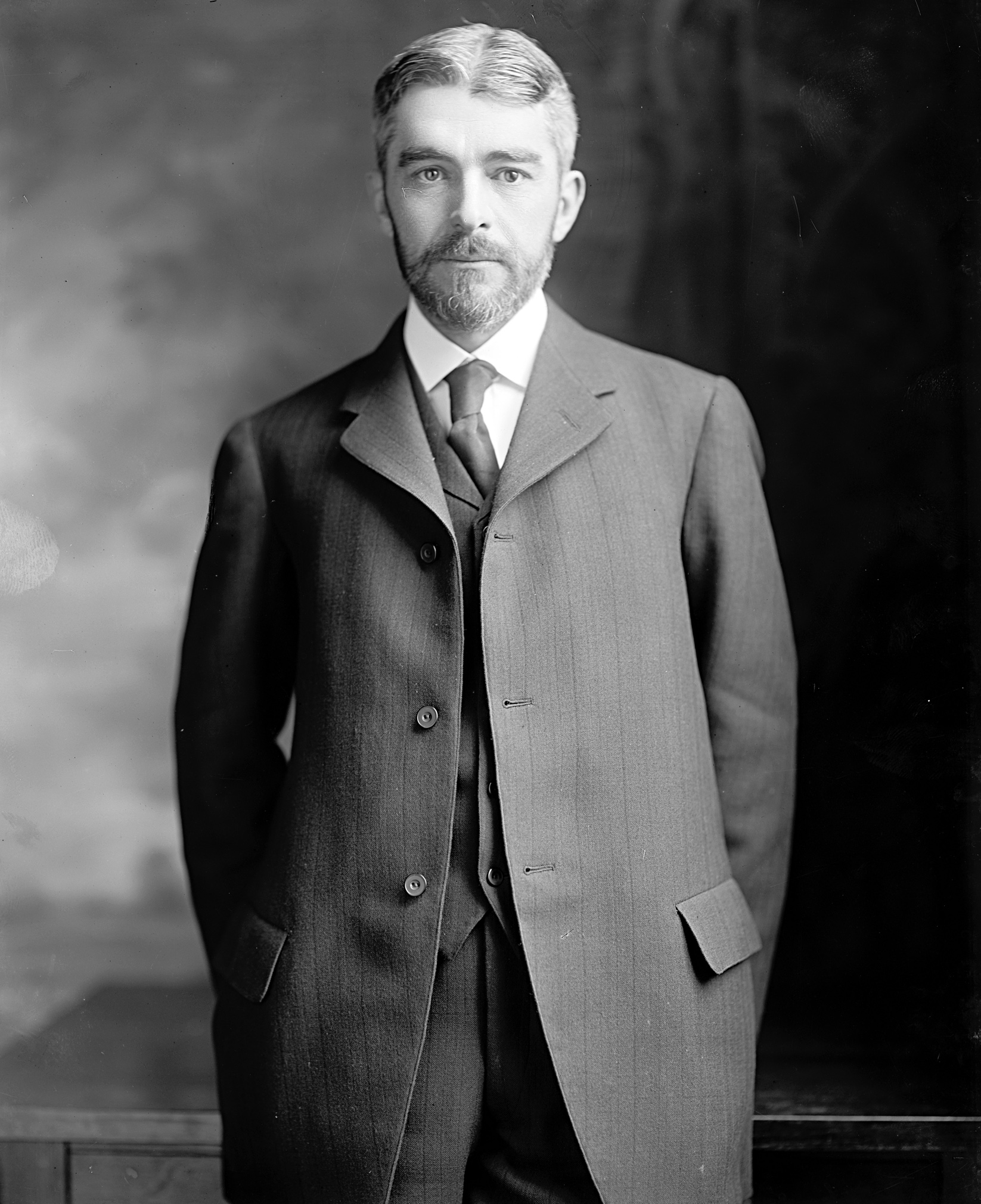

Member of the U.S. House of Representatives from Virginia's 4th district
- In office March 4, 1907 – October 31, 1909
- Preceded by: Robert G. Southall
- Succeeded by: Robert Turnbull
- In office April 19, 1900 – March 3, 1903
- Preceded by: Sydney P. Epes
- Succeeded by: Robert G. Southall

United States Attorney for the Eastern District of Virginia
- In office April 13, 1893 – October 2, 1896
- Appointed by: Grover Cleveland
- Preceded by: Thomas R. Borland
- Succeeded by: William H. White

Personal details
- Born: Francis Rives Lassiter; February 18, 1866 Petersburg, Virginia, U.S.
- Died: October 31, 1909 (aged 43) Petersburg, Virginia, U.S.
- Resting place: Blandford Cemetery
- Party: Democratic
- Relatives: William Lassiter (brother); Charles T. Lassiter (brother)
- Education: University of Virginia (LLB)
- Occupation: Lawyer; politician

Military service
- Branch/service: Virginia State Militia
- Rank: Captain
- Unit: Fourth Infantry Regiment

Francis Rives Lassiter (February 18, 1866 – October 31, 1909) was a U.S. representative from Virginia, great-nephew of Francis E. Rives.

== Early life and education ==
Francie Rives Lassiter was born in Petersburg, Virginia on February 18, 1866, one of the twin sons of Dr. Daniel W. Lassiter (1827-1903, formerly of Northampton County, North Carolina whose mother was a Quaker and who was educated at the University of Virginia and The University of Pennsylvania). During the Siege of Petersburg, on February 8, 1865, he married former Anna Rives Heath (1835-1888), daughter of merchant Hartwell Peebles Heath of Prince George County, Virginia and granddaughter of former congressman Francis E. Rives. All her brothers founght for the Confederacy and Dr. John Francis Heath died in the conflict. His twin brother, William Lassiter, graduated from the United States Military Academy at West Point, New York in 1889 and became a career United States Army officer, rising to the rank of Captain in the Spanish American War, served as inspector-general in the Philippines, and attained the rank of major general. Their younger brother Charles T. Lassiter, studied at the University of Goettingen before graduation from the University of Virginia and also became a lawyer (this man's law partner) and politician, whose major accomplishment was a road construction law passed in 1906. Their younger sister Anna Heath Lassiter Williams (1875-1972) married a doctor who became Virginia's health commissioner and moved to Richmond, but her elder sister Virginia Heath Lassiter (1874-1902) died in a carriage accident in Petersburg.

Lassiter attended McCabe's University School at Petersburg and was graduated from the law department of the University of Virginia at Charlottesville in 1886.

== Career ==
Admitted to the bar in 1887, Lassiter began practicing law in Boston, Massachusetts. He returned to Petersburg, Virginia was admitted to the Virginia bar, served as the City attorney of Petersburg from 1888 to 1893. President Grover Cleveland appointed Lassiter as the United States attorney for the eastern district of Virginia in 1893 and after confirmation by the U.S. Senate, he served until 1896, when he resigned in order unsuccessfully run to become Attorney General of Virginia (losing in the Democratic primary).

Lassiter served as captain of Company G, Fourth Regiment, Virginia State Militia, and later rose to major of the regiment. He volunteered during the Spanish American War but was stationed at Jacksonville, Florida. He also supervised the Twelfth Census for the Fourth Congressional District of Virginia in 1899.

Lassiter was elected as a Democrat to the Fifty-sixth Congress to fill the vacancy caused by the death of Sydney P. Epes. He was reelected to the Fifty-seventh Congress and served from April 19, 1900, to March 3, 1903.

Lassiter was elected to the Sixtieth and Sixty-first Congresses and served from March 4, 1907, until his death in Petersburg, Virginia, October 31, 1909. His signature accomplishment was the Lassiter-Withers Law (1906) which funded road construction.

== Death and legacy ==
Lassiter is interred in Blandford Cemetery. His family papers are held by the Special Collections Research Center at the College of William & Mary.

== Electoral history ==
- 1900; Lassiter was elected to the U.S. House of Representatives with 98.65% of the vote in a special election, defeating Independent James Seldon Cowdon; he was re-elected with 60.06% of the vote in the general election, defeating Republican C.E. Wilson.
- 1906; Lassiter was re-elected unopposed.
- 1908; Lassiter was re-elected unopposed.

== See also ==
- List of members of the United States Congress who died in office (1900–1949)

U.S. House of Representatives
Preceded by Sydney P. Epes	Member of the U.S. House of Representatives from Virginia's 4th congressional district 1900–1903	Succeeded by Robert G. Southall
Preceded by Robert G. Southall	Member of the U.S. House of Representatives from Virginia's 4th congressional district 1907–1909	Succeeded by Robert Turnbull
