= Shen Zigao =

Anglican bishop in China (1895–1982)

Shen Zigao (Chinese: 沈子高; Wade–Giles: Shen Tzu-kao; 1895–1982) was an Anglican bishop in China. He was Bishop of Shensi from 1934 to 1947.

Shen Zigao was born in Shanghai, and studied theology and art at St. John's University, Shanghai. He was a pastor at the Nanjing Anglican Church from 1917 to 1934. He also studied at the University of Oxford and the University of Cambridge, and received a Doctor of Theology degree from St. John's in 1934.

Shen advocated the adaptation of traditional Chinese music and art for use in the church. His son, Shen Yifan, became a bishop of the Three-Self Patriotic Movement in 1988.
