= Cameron Farquhar McRae (born 1812) =

American religious leader (1812–1872)

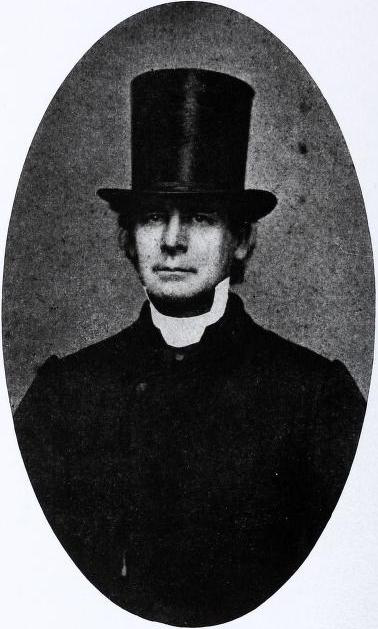
- McRae, c. 1856–1860
- Born: June 1812; Fayetteville, North Carolina, U.S.
- Died: August 1, 1872 (aged 60); Davidsonville, Maryland, U.S.
- Education: University of North Carolina; United States Military Academy; Virginia Theological Seminary
- Occupation: minister
- Organisation: Episcopal Church (United States)
- Spouses: Julia Theodosia Burgoyn (died 1853) Susan Plummer (m. 1861)
- Children: 12, including William and Cameron

Cameron Farquhar McRae (Note: Sometimes spelled MacRae.) (June 1812 – August 1, 1872) was an Episcopalian minister who served as the rector of different parishes in North Carolina, Massachusetts, Pennsylvania, Georgia, and Maryland.

== Early life and education ==
Cameron Farquhar McRae was born in June 1812 in Fayetteville, North Carolina, to Rhoda (née Young) and Duncan McRae. He was educated by John Rogers of Hillsboro. He matriculated at the University of North Carolina as a member of the class of 1829, but did not graduate. In 1827, he attended the United States Military Academy, but left due to ill health after 12 months. He served in the army, but he resigned his position to study for ministry. He then graduated from Virginia Theological Seminary in 1835. He was ordained deacon by Bishop Richard Channing Moore in the same year, and priest by Bishop Levi Silliman Ives in 1836. He was a high church Anglican.

== Career ==
For a brief time, he worked under Bishop Moore at Monumental Church in Richmond, Virginia. He then served at Trinity Episcopal Church in Portsmouth, Virginia. From 1835 to 1838, McRae was the rector of Christ Church in Elizabeth City, North Carolina. He was then the rector of Christ Church, New Bern, from 1838 to 1842. From 1842 to 1852, McRae was the rector of Emmanuel Church, Warrenton, though he was also the rector of the Church of the Holy Innocents, Henderson, from 1847 to January 1, 1849. From 1854 to 1856, he was rector of St. John's in Jamaica Plain. In 1856, he moved to Philadelphia and worked at St. John's Protestant Episcopal Church there. He then worked as assistant minister at Christ Church, Philadelphia. At the start of the American Civil War, he resigned his position and moved back to North Carolina.

During the Civil War, McRae was a chaplain in the 15th North Carolina Infantry Regiment of the Confederate States Army. At the General Council of the Protestant Episcopal Church in the Confederate States of America, McRae was one of the Georgia delegates. From 1863 to 1867, he was in Savannah, Georgia, as the rector of St. John's Church. In 1867, he became rector at All Hallows Church in Anne Arundel County, Maryland. He served in that role until his death.

In his History of the University of North Carolina, Kemp P. Battle called McRae "a prominent Episcopal minister" in several states.

== Personal life ==
McRae married Julia Theodosia Burgoyn, daughter of John F. Burgoyn and granddaughter of Jonathan Edwards, between 1838 and 1842. She died in 1853. They had seven children, including John Burgoyn and Katharine Mary. He married Susan Plummer, daughter of William Plummer, on December 11, 1861. They had five children, including William Plummer, Julia Theodosia and Cameron Farquhar.

McRae died at his home in Davidsonville, Maryland, on August 1, 1872.
