= Cameron Farquhar McRae (born 1873) =

American Episcopal missionary in China (1873–1954)

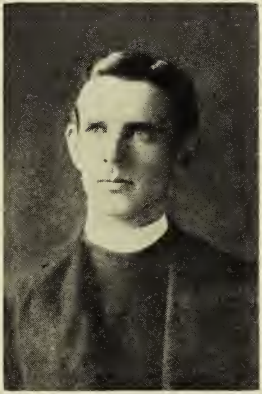
- Portrait of McRae in History of The Theological Seminary in Virginia and Its Historical Background, published in 1923.
- Born: 3 February 1873; Warrenton, North Carolina, US
- Died: 23 January 1954 (aged 80); Richmond, Virginia, US
- Other names: Mai Ganlin (麥甘霖)
- Education: Virginia Military Institute; Columbian College (MA); Virginia Theological Seminary (BD)
- Occupation: missionary in China
- Organisation: Episcopal Church (United States)
- Known for: Holy Cross Church, Wuxi; All Saints Church, Shanghai
- Spouse: Sarah Nicoll Woodward (m. 1908; died 1937)
- Children: 6
- Father: Cameron Farquhar McRae
- Relatives: William Plummer McRae (brother)

Cameron Farquhar McRae (Note: Known in Chinese as Mai Ganlin (Chinese: 麥甘霖).) (February 3, 1873 – January 23, 1954) was an American Episcopalian missionary priest in China. McRae left the United States for China in 1899 and began to work in Shanghai. Outside of his evangelistic work, McRae had been the acting-president of St. John's College, Shanghai, the rector of St. Peter's Church, Shanghai, and the founder of Holy Cross Church, Wuxi, and All Saints Church, Shanghai. In 1942, McRae left China and settled in Virginia, where he died in 1954.

== Biography ==
McRae was born in Warrenton, North Carolina, on February 3, 1873, to Rev. Cameron Farquhar MacRae. His brother was Virginia state delegate William Plummer McRae. He was a member of the 1893 class of the Virginia Military Institute and in 1895 was an instructor at the Horner Military Academy in Oxford, North Carolina. He received his master's degree from Columbian College (now George Washington University). He also studied at Virginia Theological Seminary and received his bachelor of divinity in 1899. Influenced by the foreign missionaries visiting VTS in the 1890s, which included Francis Pott, president of St. John's College, Shanghai, McRae decided to become a missionary in China and left the United States upon graduation.

McRae started working in Shanghai together with his classmate Benjamin Lucius Ancell. In 1901 he was sent to build a church in Wusih with Zhu Baoyuan (朱葆元). A small chapel was built by 1908, and the Holy Cross Church was completed and consecrated on May 10, 1916.

In Shanghai, McRae first taught at St. John's College, and he had been the acting-president of the college twice. McRae then oversaw the evangelistic work of the Episcopal Church in Shanghai and the training of catechists. Later, he became the rector of St. Peter's Church, Shanghai, where he improved its finances and eventually handed it over to the Chinese clergy and congregation. In 1914, St. Peter's Church became the third financially independent Anglican church in Shanghai. McRae had also worked at St. Luke's Hospital, Shanghai, as the chaplain. By 1923 he was planning the construction of All Saints, Shanghai, which was completed in 1925. Meanwhile, McRae married Sarah Nicoll Woodward on February 17, 1908. They had four daughters and two sons. His wife died in 1937.

After the Second Sino-Japanese War began in 1937, the Japanese troops occupied many churches in Shanghai. In 1942 McRae left the Far East and settled in Virginia. He died on January 23, 1954, in a hospital in Richmond, Virginia.

== See also ==
- Chung Hua Sheng Kung Hui, Anglican church in China
- William Jones Boone (father), first missionary bishop of China and Japan
- Frederick Graves, Episcopalian missionary bishop of Shanghai from 1893 to 1937
- Huang Xing, Chinese nationalist revolutionary, baptized at St. Peter's Church, Shanghai, in 1913
