= 1824 Virginia's 13th congressional district special election =

On February 29, 1824, Representative William Lee Ball (DR) of Virginia's 13th district died in office. A special election was held to fill the resulting vacancy.

== Election results ==
Candidate	Party	Votes	Percent
John Taliaferro	Democratic-Republican	455	55.8%
John P. Hungerford	Federalist	359	44.0%
William Hungerford		1	0.1%

== See also ==
- List of special elections to the United States House of Representatives
