= Burwell Bassett Sr. =

American politician (1734–1793)

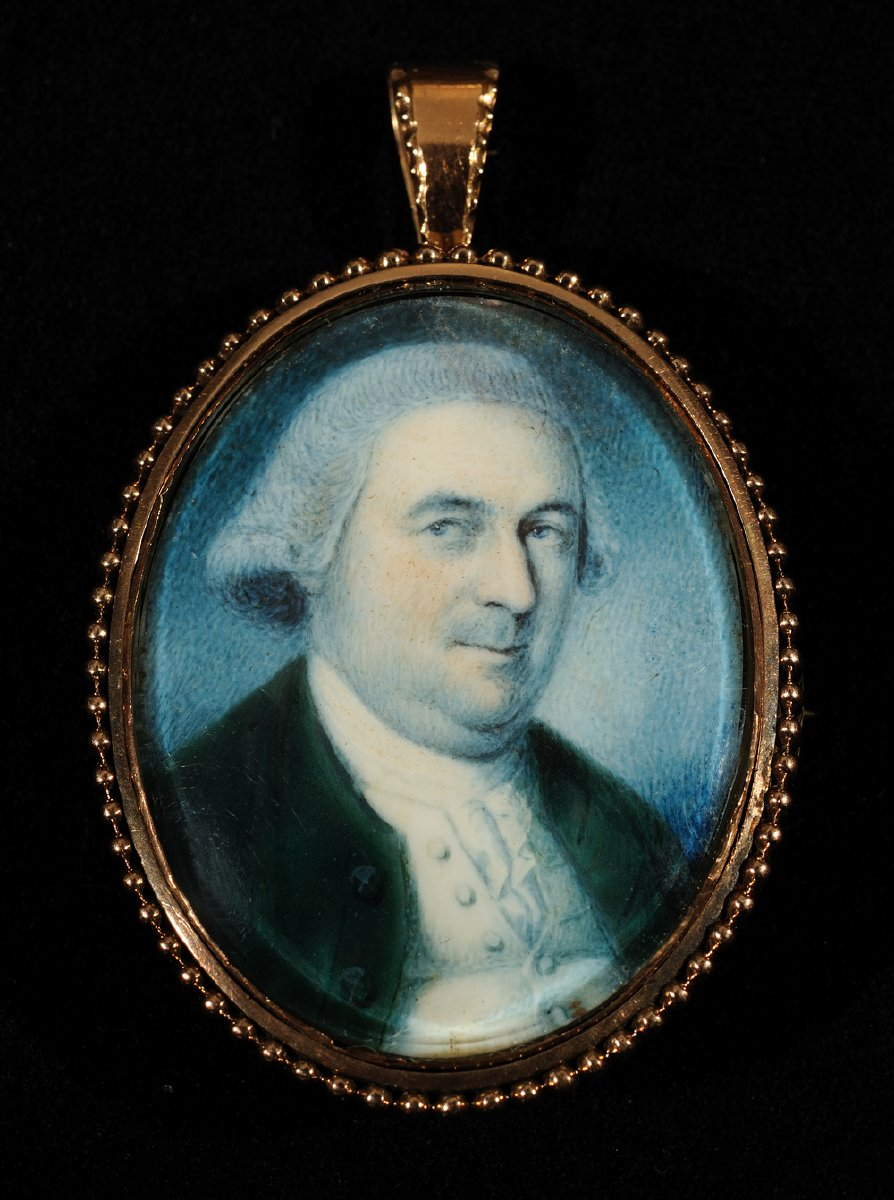
- portrait by Charles Willson Peale

Member of the Virginia Senate for Charles City, James City County and New Kent Counties
- In office May 5, 1777 – January 4, 1793
- Preceded by: John Armistead
- Succeeded by: Burwell Bassett Sr.

Member of the House of Burgesses for New Kent County
- In office 1762–1776 Serving with Richard Adams, William Clayton, Bartholomew Dandridge
- Preceded by: Gil Armistead
- Succeeded by: position abolished

Personal details
- Born: March 3, 1734 Eltham plantation, New Kent County, Province of Virginia
- Died: January 4, 1793 (aged 58) New Kent County, Virginia, US
- Citizenship: Kingdom of Great Britain; United States of America
- Spouse: Anna Marie Dandridge
- Occupation: Planter, militia officer, politician

Burwell Bassett Sr. (March 13, 1734 – January 4, 1793) was an American planter, patriot and politician from New Kent County in the Commonwealth of Virginia, who served in both chambers of the Virginia General Assembly, and in the Virginia Ratification Convention in 1788.

== Early and family life ==
The second son (and fourth of sixth children) born to the former Elizabeth Churchill and her husband, William Bassett, a planter and member of the House of Burgesses, was born at the family's Eltham plantation in New Kent County. Burwell's first name reflects that of his mother's Burwell Family of Virginia. His great-grandfather, Capt. William Bassett, had emigrated from Southampton, England, and settled in New Kent County, and may have donated the land for the county seat. His grandfather, also William Bassett (1670-1723), expanded upon the land he inherited, acquiring a second plantation and building the manor house (Eltham) where this grandson and heir would be born, as well as donated the land when the county courthouse was moved nearer his plantation. Grandfather William Bassett married a daughter of Lewis Burwell II, became the first member of the family to win election to the House of Burgessses (in 1693) and was selected for the Governor's Council in 1707. The other and last William Bassett to serve in the House of Burgesses was his son (this man's father), who died in 1744 during that service, leaving Burwell Bassett as his principal heir since the firstborn son had already died. Bassett's mother thus became a rich widow (whose second husband by law could control a third of her late husband's property until her death, with Burwell Bassett gaining control of 2/3s of the property on reaching legal age). She remarried, to Rev. William Dawson, president of the College of William and Mary and a member of the Governor's Council (1745–1752), who helped raise Burwell.

In 1753, Burwell Bassett married Ann Kidley Chamberlayne, but she died the following year and their daughter never reached adulthood. On May 7, 1757, Bassett remarried, this time to Anna Maria Dandridge, whose father was a member of the House of Burgesses. Her sister Martha Dandridge had married Daniel Parke Custis, who would also leave her a wealthy widow, who married George Washington, then a planter and military officer, who would rise to become General and President of the United States. Anna Marie Bassett bore four sons and four daughters, and those who reached adulthood continued Bassett family tradition by marrying into politically powerful families. Their son Burwell Bassett Jr. would continue the Bassett planter and politician traditions.

== Career ==
One of the wealthiest men in New Kent County, Bassett owned four plantations in 1782, including 5980 acres in New Kent County and another 1000 acres in Hanover County (which the legislature split from New Kent County in his lifetime).

New Kent County voters first elected Bassett as one of their representatives in the House of Burgesses in 1762, following the death of Gil Armistead. While he served alongside Richard Adams for the remainder of the session, voters elected William Clayton in 1766 as his co-delegate and re-elected the pair until the Assembly of 1772, when Bartholomew Dandridge became the other New Kent delegate until Lord Dunmore as the Colony's governor suppressed the assembly. New Kent County voters then elected Bassett and Dandridge then represented New Kent County in the first four of the five Virginia Revolutionary Conventions. William Clayton replaced Bassett for the Fifth Virginia Convention and in the first session of the Virginia House of Delegates, as the upper house of the Virginia General Assembly came to be called following the former colony's first constitution. Iwever, in 1777, voters from New Kent, as well as nearby Charles City and James City Counties elected Bassett to the Virginia Senate, and he continued to win re-election until his death. Bassett also represented New Kent County in the Virginia Ratification Convention of 1788, which ratified the U.S. Constitution.

== Death and legacy ==
Following his death, his son Burwell Bassett Jr. won election to the Virginia Senate seat his father had held for so long. In 1844, one of his descendants sold the Eltham plantation and 60 enslaved people at auction, as he had moved his residence to Clover Lea plantation.

External image
- Image of the Eltham historical marker

The plantation house burned in 1876, but the state of Virginia erected a historical marker remembering this patriot Burwell Bassett and the Eltham manor house.
