= Eltham Manor =

Historic house in Virginia, United States

- U.S. National Register of Historic Places
- Virginia Landmarks Register
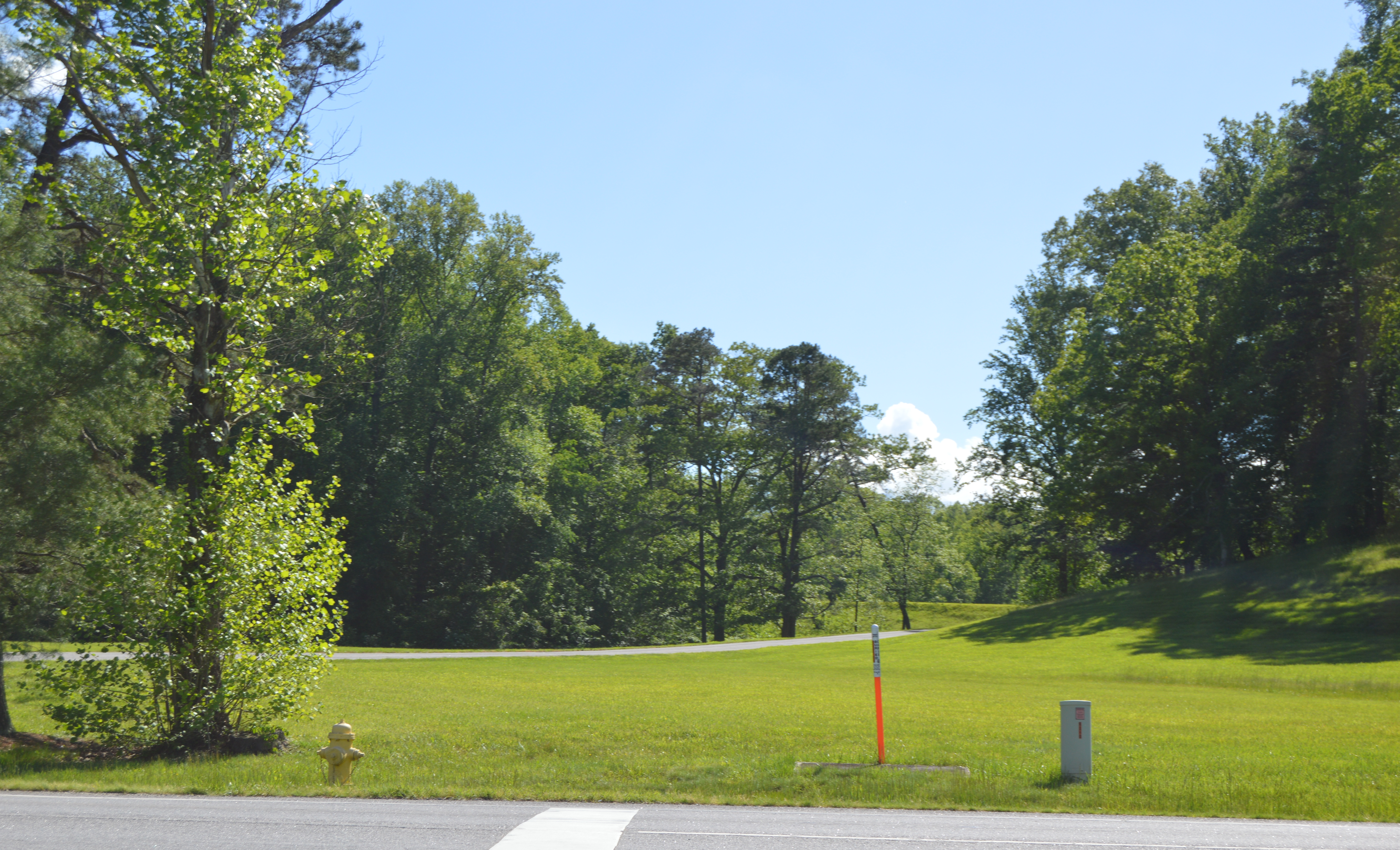
- Entrance to the property

- Location within Virginia Location within the United States
- Location: 405 Riverside Dr., near Bassett, Virginia
- Coordinates: 36°43′57″N 79°58′05″W
- Area: 200 acres (81 ha)
- Built: 1936
- Built by: Millard Mason (barn)
- Architect: William Roy Wallace
- Architectural style: Colonial Revival
- NRHP reference No.: 99000960
- VLR No.: 044-5011

Significant dates
- Added to NRHP: August 5, 1999
- Designated VLR: December 7, 2005

Eltham Manor is a historic estate located near Bassett, Henry County, Virginia. It was built in 1936 by William McKinley Bassett, and is a Colonial Revival brick dwelling. The manor is named for the Burwell Bassett family home, "Eltham Plantation", in Eltham, Virginia, that burned in 1879. It consists of a 2 1/2-story, five-bay, central section flanked by two-story wings, connected by cured hyphens to a two-story garage and servant's quarters at the north end and a one-story open-air pavilion at the south end. The front facade features a Doric order portico with smooth two-story columns. Also on the property are a contributing barn (c. 1936) and lake (c. 1936).

It was listed on the National Register of Historic Places in 1999.
