= List of United States representatives from Virginia =

Page of list of Wikipedia

The following is a list of United States representatives from the commonwealth of Virginia ordered by district number. For chronological tables of members of both houses of the United States Congress from the state (through the present day), see Virginia's congressional delegations. The list of names should be complete, but other data may be incomplete.

== Current representatives ==
As of September 9, 2025

- 1st district: Rob Wittman (R) (since 2007)
- 2nd district: Jen Kiggans (R) (since 2023)
- 3rd district: Bobby Scott (D) (since 1993)
- 4th district: Jennifer McClellan (D) (since 2023)
- 5th district: John McGuire (R) (since 2025)
- 6th district: Ben Cline (R) (since 2019)
- 7th district: Eugene Vindman (D) (since 2025)
- 8th district: Don Beyer (D) (since 2015)
- 9th district: Morgan Griffith (R) (since 2011)
- 10th district: Suhas Subramanyam (D) (since 2025)
- 11th district: James Walkinshaw (D) (since 2025)

== List of members ==
Member	Party	Years served	District	Notes
Watkins M. Abbitt	Democratic	February 17, 1948 - January 3, 1973	4th	[data missing]
Mark Alexander	Democratic-Republican	March 4, 1819 - March 3, 1823	18th	[data missing]
Mark Alexander	Democratic-Republican	March 4, 1823 - March 3, 1825	4th	[data missing]
Mark Alexander	Jacksonian	March 4, 1825 - March 3, 1833	4th	[data missing]
George Allen	Republican	November 5, 1991 - January 3, 1993	7th	[data missing]
John J. Allen	Anti-Jacksonian	March 4, 1833 - March 3, 1835	20th	[data missing]
Robert Allen	Jacksonian	March 4, 1827 - March 3, 1833	17th	[data missing]
J. Lindsay Almond	Democratic	January 22, 1946 - April 17, 1948	6th	Elected Attorney General of Virginia
William S. Archer	Democratic-Republican	January 3, 1820 - March 3, 1823	17th	[data missing]
William S. Archer	Democratic-Republican	March 4, 1823 - March 3, 1825	3rd	[data missing]
William S. Archer	Jacksonian	March 4, 1825 - March 3, 1835	3rd	[data missing]
William Armstrong	Anti-Jacksonian	March 4, 1825 - March 3, 1829	16th	[data missing]
William Armstrong	Anti-Jacksonian	March 4, 1829 - March 3, 1833	16th	[data missing]
Archibald Atkinson	Democratic	March 4, 1843 - March 3, 1849	1st	[data missing]
Archibald Austin	Democratic-Republican	March 4, 1817 - March 3, 1819	16th	[data missing]
Thomas H. Averett	Democratic	March 4, 1849 - March 3, 1853	3rd	[data missing]
Richard S. Ayer	Republican	January 31, 1870 - March 3, 1871	1st	[data missing]
John Baker	Federalist	March 4, 1811 - March 3, 1813	2nd	[data missing]
William L. Ball	Democratic-Republican	March 4, 1817 - March 3, 1823	9th	[data missing]
William L. Ball	Democratic-Republican	March 4, 1823 - February 29, 1824	13th	Died
Linn Banks	Democratic	April 28, 1838 - March 3, 1841	13th	[data missing]
John S. Barbour	Democratic-Republican	March 4, 1823 - March 3, 1825	15th	[data missing]
John S. Barbour	Jacksonian	March 4, 1825 - March 3, 1833	15th	[data missing]
John S. Barbour Jr.	Democratic	March 4, 1881 - March 3, 1887	8th	[data missing]
Philip P. Barbour	Democratic-Republican	September 19, 1814 - March 3, 1825	11th	[data missing]
Philip P. Barbour	Jacksonian	March 4, 1827 - October 15, 1830	11th	Resigned to become U.S. Circuit Court judge
Philip P. Barbour	Jacksonian	1829-1830	11th	[data missing]
Richard W. Barton	Whig	March 4, 1841 - March 3, 1843	15th	[data missing]
Burwell Bassett	Democratic-Republican	March 4, 1805 - March 3, 1813	12th	[data missing]
Burwell Bassett	Democratic-Republican	March 4, 1813 - March 3, 1819	13th	[data missing]
Burwell Bassett	Democratic-Republican	March 4, 1821 - March 3, 1823	13th	[data missing]
Burwell Bassett	Democratic-Republican	March 4, 1823 - March 3, 1825	8th	[data missing]
Burwell Bassett	Jacksonian	March 4, 1825 - March 3, 1829	8th	[data missing]
Herbert H. Bateman	Republican	January 3, 1983 - September 11, 2000	1st	Died
Thomas H. Bayly	Democratic	May 6, 1844 - March 3, 1853	7th	[data missing]
Thomas H. Bayly	Democratic	March 4, 1853 - June 23, 1856	1st	Died
Thomas M. Bayly	Federalist	March 4, 1813 - March 3, 1815	13th	[data missing]
James M. H. Beale	Jacksonian	March 4, 1833 - March 3, 1837	16th	[data missing]
James M. H. Beale	Jacksonian	March 4, 1849 - March 3, 1853	14th	[data missing]
Richard L. T. Beale	Democratic	March 4, 1847 - March 3, 1849	8th	[data missing]
Richard L. T. Beale	Democratic	January 23, 1879 - March 3, 1881	1st	[data missing]
Henry Bedinger III	Democratic	March 4, 1845 - March 3, 1849	10th	[data missing]
Andrew Beirne	Democratic	March 4, 1837 - March 3, 1841	19th	[data missing]
Don Beyer	Democratic	January 3, 2015 – present	8th	Incumbent
Jacob B. Blair	Unionist	December 2, 1861 - March 3, 1863	11th	[data missing]
S. Otis Bland	Democratic	July 2, 1918 - March 3, 1933	1st	[data missing]
S. Otis Bland	Democratic	March 4, 1933 - January 3, 1935	At-large	[data missing]
S. Otis Bland	Democratic	January 3, 1935 - February 16, 1950	1st	Died
Theodorick Bland	Anti-Administration	March 4, 1789 - June 1, 1790	9th	Died
Thomas J. Bliley Jr.	Republican	January 3, 1981 - January 3, 1993	3rd	[data missing]
Thomas J. Bliley Jr.	Republican	January 3, 1993 - January 3, 2001	7th	[data missing]
Thomas S. Bocock	Democratic	March 4, 1847 - March 3, 1853	4th	[data missing]
Thomas S. Bocock	Democratic	March 4, 1853 - March 3, 1861	5th	Resigned
George W. Booker	Conservative	January 26, 1870 - March 3, 1871	4th	[data missing]
Alexander R. Boteler	Opposition	March 4, 1859 - March 3, 1861	8th	[data missing]
John M. Botts	Whig	March 4, 1839 - March 3, 1843	11th	[data missing]
John M. Botts	Whig	March 4, 1847 - March 3, 1849	6th	[data missing]
Rick Boucher	Democratic	January 3, 1983 - January 3, 2011	9th	[data missing]
James W. Bouldin	Jacksonian	March 15, 1834 - March 3, 1837	5th	[data missing]
James W. Bouldin	Democratic	March 4, 1837 - March 3, 1839	5th	[data missing]
Thomas T. Bouldin	Jacksonian	March 4, 1829 - March 3, 1833	5th	[data missing]
Thomas T. Bouldin	Democratic	August 26, 1833 - February 11, 1834	5th	Died
George E. Bowden	Republican	March 4, 1887 - March 3, 1891	2nd	[data missing]
Henry Bowen	Readjuster	March 4, 1883 - March 3, 1885	9th	[data missing]
Henry Bowen	Republican	March 4, 1887 - March 3, 1889	9th	[data missing]
Rees T. Bowen	Democratic	March 4, 1873 - March 3, 1875	9th	[data missing]
James D. Brady	Republican	March 4, 1885 - March 3, 1887	4th	[data missing]
Dave Brat	Republican	November 12, 2014 - January 3, 2019	7th	[data missing]
Elliott M. Braxton	Democratic	March 4, 1871 - March 3, 1873	7th	[data missing]
James Breckinridge	Federalist	March 4, 1809 - March 3, 1817	5th	[data missing]
Richard Brent	Democratic-Republican	March 4, 1795 - March 3, 1799	17th	[data missing]
Richard Brent	Democratic-Republican	March 4, 1801 - March 3, 1803	17th	[data missing]
John Brown	Anti-Administration	March 4, 1789 - June 1, 1792	2nd	Resigned
John R. Brown	Republican	March 4, 1887 - March 3, 1889	5th	[data missing]
William G. Brown	Democratic	March 4, 1845 - March 3, 1849	15th	[data missing]
William G. Brown	Unionist	March 4, 1861 - March 3, 1863	10th	[data missing]
Thomas H. B. Browne	Republican	March 4, 1887 - March 3, 1891	1st	[data missing]
Joel T. Broyhill	Republican	January 3, 1953 - December 31, 1974	10th	Resigned
John A. Buchanan	Democratic	March 4, 1889 - March 3, 1893	9th	[data missing]
Thomas G. Burch	Democratic	March 4, 1931 - March 3, 1933	5th	[data missing]
Thomas G. Burch	Democratic	March 4, 1933 - January 3, 1935	At-large	[data missing]
Thomas G. Burch	Democratic	January 3, 1935 - May 31, 1946	5th	Appointed to the US Senate
William A. Burwell	Democratic-Republican	December 1, 1806 - March 3, 1813	13th	[data missing]
William A. Burwell	Democratic-Republican	March 4, 1813 - February 16, 1821	14th	Died
Clarence G. Burton	Democratic	November 2, 1948 - January 3, 1953	6th	[data missing]
M. Caldwell Butler	Republican	November 7, 1972 - January 3, 1983	6th	[data missing]
Leslie L. Byrne	Democratic	January 3, 1993 - January 3, 1995	11th	[data missing]
George C. Cabell	Democratic	March 4, 1875 –March 4, 1887	5th	[data missing]
Samuel J. Cabell	Democratic-Republican	March 4, 1795 - March 3, 1803	14th	[data missing]
Eric I. Cantor	Republican	January 3, 2001 - August 18, 2014	7th	Resigned
Hugh Caperton	Federalist	March 4, 1813 - March 3, 1815	7th	[data missing]
John S. Carlile	American	March 4, 1855 - March 3, 1857	11th	[data missing]
John S. Carlile	Unionist	March 4, 1861 - July 9, 1861	11th	Resigned after being elected to the US Senate
Charles C. Carlin	Democratic	November 5, 1907 - March 3, 1919	8th	[data missing]
George B. Cary	Democratic	March 4, 1841 - March 3, 1843	2nd	[data missing]
John S. Caskie	Democratic	March 4, 1851 - March 3, 1853	6th	[data missing]
John S. Caskie	Democratic	March 4, 1853 - March 3, 1859	3rd	[data missing]
Augustus A. Chapman	Democratic	March 4, 1843 - March 3, 1847	12th	[data missing]
Samuel Chilton	Whig	March 4, 1843 - March 3, 1845	9th	[data missing]
Joseph W. Chinn	Jacksonian	March 4, 1831 - March 3, 1833	13th	[data missing]
Joseph W. Chinn	Jacksonian	March 4, 1833 - March 3, 1835	10th	[data missing]
John Claiborne	Democratic-Republican	March 4, 1805 - October 9, 1808	17th	Died
Nathaniel H. Claiborne	Jacksonian	March 4, 1825 - March 3, 1835	7th	[data missing]
Nathaniel H. Claiborne	Anti-Jacksonian	March 4, 1835 - March 3, 1837	7th	[data missing]
Thomas Claiborne	Anti-Administration	March 4, 1793 - March 3, 1795	8th	[data missing]
Thomas Claiborne	Democratic-Republican	March 4, 1795 - March 3, 1799	8th	[data missing]
Thomas Claiborne	Democratic-Republican	March 4, 1801 - March 3, 1803	8th	[data missing]
Thomas Claiborne	Democratic-Republican	March 4, 1803 - March 3, 1805	17th	[data missing]
Christopher H. Clark	Democratic-Republican	November 5, 1804 - July 1, 1806	13th	Resigned
Matthew Clay	Democratic-Republican	March 4, 1797 - March 3, 1803	6th	[data missing]
Matthew Clay	Democratic-Republican	March 4, 1803 - March 3, 1813	14th	[data missing]
Matthew Clay	Democratic-Republican	March 4, 1815 - May 27, 1815	15th	Died
Sherrard Clemens	Democratic	December 6, 1852 - March 3, 1853	15th	[data missing]
Sherrard Clemens	Democratic	March 4, 1857 - March 3, 1861	10th	[data missing]
Ben Cline	Republican	January 3, 2019 – present	6th	Incumbent
John Clopton	Democratic-Republican	March 4, 1795 - March 3, 1799	13th	[data missing]
John Clopton	Democratic-Republican	March 4, 1801 - March 3, 1803	13th	[data missing]
John Clopton	Democratic-Republican	March 4, 1803 - March 3, 1813	22nd	[data missing]
John Clopton	Democratic-Republican	March 4, 1813 - September 11, 1816	23rd	Died
Richard Coke Jr.	Jacksonian	March 4, 1829 - March 3, 1833	8th	[data missing]
Isaac Coles	Anti-Administration	March 4, 1789 - March 3, 1791	6th	[data missing]
Isaac Coles	Anti-Administration	March 4, 1793 - March 3, 1795	6th	[data missing]
Isaac Coles	Democratic-Republican	March 4, 1795 - March 3, 1797	6th	[data missing]
Walter Coles	Jacksonian	March 4, 1835 - March 3, 1837	6th	[data missing]
Walter Coles	Democratic	March 4, 1837 - March 3, 1843	6th	[data missing]
Walter Coles	Democratic	March 4, 1843 - March 3, 1845	3rd	[data missing]
Edward Colston	Federalist	March 4, 1817 - March 3, 1819	2nd	[data missing]
Barbara Comstock	Republican	January 3, 2015 - January 3, 2019	10th	[data missing]
Gerry Connolly	Democratic	January 3, 2009 – May 21, 2025	11th	Died
Robert Craig	Jacksonian	March 4, 1829 - March 3, 1833	20th	[data missing]
Robert Craig	Jacksonian	March 4, 1835 - March 3, 1837	17th	[data missing]
Robert Craig	Democratic	March 4, 1837 - March 3, 1841	17th	[data missing]
John Critcher	Democratic	March 4, 1871 - March 3, 1873	1st	[data missing]
Thomas Croxton	Democratic	March 4, 1885 - March 3, 1887	1st	[data missing]
George W. Crump	Jacksonian	January 21, 1826 - March 3, 1827	5th	[data missing]
John W. Daniel	Democratic	March 4, 1885 - March 3, 1887	6th	[data missing]
Robert W. Daniel Jr.	Republican	January 3, 1973 - January 3, 1983	4th	[data missing]
W. C. "Dan" Daniel	Democratic	January 3, 1969 - January 23, 1988	5th	Died
Colgate W. Darden Jr.	Democratic	March 4, 1933 - January 3, 1935	At-large	[data missing]
Colgate W. Darden Jr.	Democratic	January 3, 1935 - January 3, 1937	2nd	[data missing]
Colgate W. Darden Jr.	Democratic	January 3, 1939 - March 1, 1941	2nd	Resigned to run for Governor of Virginia
Ralph H. Daughton	Democratic	November 7, 1944 - January 3, 1947	2nd	[data missing]
Thomas Davenport	Jacksonian	March 4, 1825 - March 3, 1833	6th	[data missing]
Thomas Davenport	Anti-Jacksonian	March 4, 1833 - March 3, 1835	6th	[data missing]
Alexander M. Davis	Democratic	March 4, 1873 - March 5, 1874	5th	Election invalidated
Jo Ann Davis	Republican	January 3, 2001 - October 6, 2007	1st	Died
Thomas M. Davis	Republican	January 3, 1995 - November 24, 2008	11th	Resigned
John Dawson	Democratic-Republican	March 4, 1797 - March 3, 1803	15th	[data missing]
John Dawson	Democratic-Republican	March 4, 1803 - March 3, 1813	10th	[data missing]
John Dawson	Democratic-Republican	March 4, 1813 - March 31, 1814	11th	Died
Joseph T. Deal	Democratic	March 4, 1921 - March 3, 1929	2nd	[data missing]
Daniel C. DeJarnette Sr.	Independent Democratic	March 4, 1859 –March 4, 1861	3rd	[data missing]
John F. Dezendorf	Republican	March 4, 1881 - March 3, 1883	2nd	[data missing]
Philip Doddridge	Anti-Jacksonian	March 4, 1829 - November 19, 1832	18th	Died
Beverly B. Douglas	Democratic	March 4, 1875 - December 22, 1878	1st	Died
Thomas N. Downing	Democratic	January 3, 1959 - January 3, 1977	1st	[data missing]
Thelma D. Drake	Republican	January 3, 2005 - January 3, 2009	2nd	[data missing]
Joseph Draper	Jacksonian	December 6, 1830 - March 3, 1831	22nd	[data missing]
Joseph Draper	Jacksonian	December 6, 1832 - March 3, 1833	22nd	[data missing]
Patrick H. Drewry	Democratic	April 27, 1920 - March 3, 1933	4th	[data missing]
Patrick H. Drewry	Democratic	March 4, 1933 - January 3, 1935	At-large	[data missing]
Patrick H. Drewry	Democratic	January 3, 1935 - December 21, 1947	4th	Died
George C. Dromgoole	Jacksonian	March 4, 1835 - March 3, 1837	4th	[data missing]
George C. Dromgoole	Democratic	March 4, 1837 - March 3, 1841	4th	[data missing]
George C. Dromgoole	Democratic	March 4, 1843 - April 27, 1847	2nd	Died
Richard T. W. Duke Jr.	Conservative	November 8, 1870 - March 3, 1871	5th	[data missing]
Richard T. W. Duke Jr.	Democratic	March 4, 1871 - March 3, 1873	5th	[data missing]
Paul C. Edmunds	Democratic	March 4, 1889 - March 3, 1895	6th	[data missing]
Henry A. Edmundson	Democratic	March 4, 1849 - March 3, 1861	12th	[data missing]
Joseph Eggleston	Democratic-Republican	December 3, 1798 - March 3, 1801	9th	[data missing]
Tazewell Ellett	Democratic	March 4, 1895 - March 3, 1897	3rd	[data missing]
James F. Epes	Democratic	March 4, 1891 - March 3, 1895	4th	[data missing]
Sydney P. Epes	Democratic	March 4, 1897 - March 23, 1898	4th	Election invalidated
Sydney P. Epes	Democratic	March 4, 1899 - March 3, 1900	4th	Died
John W. Eppes	Democratic-Republican	March 4, 1803 - March 3, 1811	16th	[data missing]
John W. Eppes	Democratic-Republican	March 4, 1813 - March 3, 1815	16th	[data missing]
Benjamin Estil	Anti-Jacksonian	March 4, 1825 - March 3, 1827	22nd	[data missing]
Thomas Evans	Federalist	March 4, 1797 - March 3, 1801	12th	[data missing]
Charles J. Faulkner	Whig	March 4, 1851 - March 3, 1853	10th	[data missing]
Charles J. Faulkner	Democratic	March 4, 1853 - March 3, 1859	8th	[data missing]
John W. Fishburne	Democratic	March 4, 1931 - March 3, 1933	7th	[data missing]
Joseph L. Fisher	Democratic	January 3, 1975 - January 3, 1981	10th	[data missing]
John W. Flannagan Jr.	Democratic	March 4, 1931 - March 3, 1933	9th	[data missing]
John W. Flannagan Jr.	Democratic	March 4, 1933 - January 3, 1935	At-large	[data missing]
John W. Flannagan Jr.	Democratic	January 3, 1935 - January 3, 1949	9th	[data missing]
Henry D. Flood	Democratic	March 4, 1901 - December 8, 1921	10th	Died
Joel W. Flood	Democratic	November 8, 1932 - March 3, 1933	10th	[data missing]
Thomas S. Flournoy	Whig	March 4, 1847 - March 3, 1849	3rd	[data missing]
John Floyd	Democratic-Republican	March 4, 1817 - March 3, 1823	5th	[data missing]
John Floyd	Republican	1823–1825	20th	[data missing]
John Floyd	Jacksonian	March 4, 1825 - March 3, 1829	20th	[data missing]
J. Randy Forbes	Republican	June 19, 2001 - January 3, 2017	4th	[data missing]
Thomas B. Fugate	Democratic	January 3, 1949 - January 3, 1953	9th	[data missing]
Abram Fulkerson	Democratic	March 4, 1881 - March 3, 1883	9th	[data missing]
Andrew S. Fulton	Whig	March 4, 1847 - March 3, 1849	13th	[data missing]
John H. Fulton	Jacksonian	March 4, 1833 - March 3, 1835	18th	[data missing]
William E. Gaines	Republican	March 4, 1887 - March 3, 1889	4th	[data missing]
Jacob A. Garber	Republican	March 4, 1929 - March 3, 1931	7th	[data missing]
David S. Garland	Democratic-Republican	January 10, 1810 - March 3, 1811	21st	[data missing]
James Garland	Jacksonian	March 4, 1835 - March 3, 1837	12th	[data missing]
James Garland	Democratic	March 4, 1837 - March 3, 1839	12th	[data missing]
James Garland	Conservative	March 4, 1839 - March 3, 1841	12th	[data missing]
James M. Garnett	Democratic-Republican	March 4, 1805 - March 3, 1809	11th	[data missing]
Muscoe R. H. Garnett	Democratic	December 1, 1856 - March 3, 1861	1st	[data missing]
Robert S. Garnett	Democratic-Republican	March 4, 1823 - March 3, 1825	12th	[data missing]
Robert S. Garnett	Jacksonian	March 4, 1825 - March 3, 1827	12th	[data missing]
Thomas Garrett Jr.	Republican	January 3, 2017 - January 3, 2019	5th	[data missing]
George T. Garrison	Democratic	March 4, 1881 - March 3, 1883	1st	[data missing]
George T. Garrison	Democratic	March 20, 1884 - March 3, 1885	1st	[data missing]
J. Vaughan Gary	Democratic	March 6, 1945 - January 3, 1965	3rd	[data missing]
James H. Gholson	Anti-Jacksonian	March 4, 1833 - March 3, 1835	4th	[data missing]
Thomas Gholson Jr.	Democratic-Republican	November 7, 1808 - March 3, 1813	17th	[data missing]
Thomas Gholson Jr.	Democratic-Republican	March 4, 1813 - July 4, 1816	18th	Died
James K. Gibson	Conservative	January 28, 1870 - March 3, 1871	8th	[data missing]
William B. Giles	Anti-Administration	December 7, 1790 - March 3, 1795	9th	[data missing]
William B. Giles	Democratic-Republican	March 4, 1795 - October 2, 1798	9th	Resigned
William B. Giles	Democratic-Republican	March 4, 1801 - March 3, 1803	9th	[data missing]
Thomas W. Gilmer	Whig	March 4, 1841 - March 3, 1843	12th	[data missing]
Thomas W. Gilmer	Democratic	March 4, 1843 - February 18, 1844	5th	Appointed Secretary of the Navy
E. Carter Glass	Democratic	November 4, 1902 - December 16, 1918	6th	Appointed U.S. Secretary of Treasury
Bob Good	Republican	January 3, 2021 - January 3, 2025	5th	Lost renomination to McGuire
William L. Goggin	Whig	March 4, 1839 - March 3, 1843	7th	[data missing]
William L. Goggin	Whig	May 10, 1844 - March 3, 1845	5th	[data missing]
William L. Goggin	Whig	March 4, 1847 - March 3, 1849	5th	[data missing]
John Goode Jr.	Democratic	March 4, 1875 - March 3, 1881	2nd	[data missing]
Samuel Goode	Democratic-Republican	March 4, 1799 –March 4, 1801	8th	[data missing]
Virgil H. Goode Jr.	Democratic	January 3, 1997 - January 27, 2000	5th	[data missing]
Virgil H. Goode Jr.	Independent	January 27, 2000 - August 1, 2002	5th	[data missing]
Virgil H. Goode Jr.	Republican	August 1, 2002 - January 3, 2009	5th	[data missing]
William O. Goode	Democratic	March 4, 1841 - March 3, 1843	4th	[data missing]
William O. Goode	Democratic	March 4, 1853 - July 3, 1859	4th	Died
Richard W. Goodlatte	Republican	January 3, 1993 - January 3, 2019	6th	[data missing]
Peterson Goodwyn	Democratic-Republican	March 4, 1803 - March 3, 1813	18th	[data missing]
Peterson Goodwyn	Democratic-Republican	March 4, 1813 - February 21, 1818	19th	Died
William F. Gordon	Jacksonian	January 25, 1830 - March 3, 1833	10th	[data missing]
William F. Gordon	Jacksonian	March 4, 1833 - March 3, 1835	12th	[data missing]
Edwin Gray	Democratic-Republican	March 4, 1799 - March 3, 1803	10th	[data missing]
Edwin Gray	Democratic-Republican	March 4, 1803 - March 3, 1813	19th	[data missing]
John C. Gray	Democratic-Republican	August 28, 1820 - March 3, 1821	20th	[data missing]
Samuel Griffin	Pro-Administration	March 4, 1789 - March 3, 1791	10th	[data missing]
Samuel Griffin	Anti-Administration	March 4, 1791 - March 3, 1793	10th	[data missing]
Samuel Griffin	Pro-Administration	March 4, 1793 - March 3, 1795	13th	[data missing]
Thomas Griffin	Federalist	March 4, 1803 - March 3, 1805	12th	[data missing]
Morgan Griffith	Republican	January 3, 2011 – present	9th	Incumbent
Norman R. Hamilton	Democratic	January 3, 1937 - January 3, 1939	2nd	[data missing]
George Hancock	Pro-Administration	March 4, 1793 - March 3, 1795	5th	[data missing]
George Hancock	Federalist	March 4, 1795 - March 3, 1797	5th	[data missing]
Porter Hardy Jr.	Democratic	January 3, 1947 - January 3, 1969	2nd	[data missing]
Herbert E. Harris II	Democratic	January 3, 1975 - January 3, 1981	8th	[data missing]
John T. Harris	Nullifier	March 4, 1859 - March 3, 1861	9th	[data missing]
John T. Harris	Democratic	March 4, 1871 –March 4, 1873	6th	[data missing]
John T. Harris	Democratic	March 4, 1873 - March 3, 1881	7th	[data missing]
William A. Harris	Democratic	March 4, 1841 - March 3, 1843	16th	[data missing]
Winder R. Harris	Democratic	April 8, 1941 - September 15, 1944	2nd	Resigned
Burr P. Harrison	Democratic	November 5, 1946 - January 3, 1963	7th	[data missing]
Carter B. Harrison	Anti-Administration	March 4, 1793 - March 3, 1795	10th	[data missing]
Carter B. Harrison	Democratic-Republican	March 4, 1795 - March 3, 1799	10th	[data missing]
Thomas W. Harrison	Democratic	November 7, 1916 - December 15, 1922	7th	Election invalidated
Thomas W. Harrison	Democratic	March 4, 1923 - March 3, 1929	7th	[data missing]
Aylett Hawes	Democratic-Republican	March 4, 1811 - March 3, 1813	9th	[data missing]
Aylett Hawes	Democratic-Republican	March 4, 1813 - March 3, 1817	10th	[data missing]
James Hay	Democratic	March 4, 1897 - October 1, 1916	7th	appointed justice to the United States Court of Claims
Thomas S. Haymond	Whig	March 4, 1849 - March 3, 1851	15th	[data missing]
Samuel L. Hays	Democratic	March 4, 1841 - March 3, 1843	20th	[data missing]
John Heath	Anti-Administration	March 4, 1793 - March 3, 1795	19th	[data missing]
John Heath	Democratic-Republican	March 4, 1795 - March 3, 1797	19th	[data missing]
John Hill	Whig	March 4, 1839 –March 4, 1841	5th	[data missing]
Alexander R. Holladay	Democratic	March 4, 1849 - March 3, 1853	8th	[data missing]
Edward E. Holland	Democratic	March 4, 1911 - March 3, 1921	2nd	[data missing]
Joel Holleman	Democratic	March 4, 1839 - December 1, 1840	1st	Resigned
David Holmes	Democratic-Republican	March 4, 1797 - March 3, 1803	2nd	[data missing]
David Holmes	Democratic-Republican	March 4, 1803 - March 3, 1809	4th	[data missing]
J. Murray Hooker	Democratic	November 8, 1921 - March 3, 1925	5th	[data missing]
Benjamin S. Hooper	Readjuster	March 4, 1883 - March 3, 1885	4th	[data missing]
George W. Hopkins	Jacksonian	March 4, 1835 - March 3, 1837	18th	[data missing]
George W. Hopkins	Democratic	March 4, 1837 - March 3, 1839	18th	[data missing]
George W. Hopkins	Conservative	March 4, 1839 - March 3, 1841	18th	[data missing]
George W. Hopkins	Democratic	March 4, 1841 - March 3, 1843	18th	[data missing]
George W. Hopkins	Democratic	March 4, 1843 - March 3, 1847	13th	[data missing]
George W. Hopkins	Democratic	March 4, 1857 - March 3, 1859	13th	[data missing]
Samuel I. Hopkins	Union Labor Party	March 4, 1887 - March 3, 1889	6th	[data missing]
Edmund W. Hubard	Democratic	March 4, 1841 - March 3, 1843	5th	[data missing]
Edmund W. Hubard	Democratic	March 4, 1843 - March 3, 1847	4th	[data missing]
John P. Hungerford	Democratic-Republican	March 4, 1811 - November 29, 1811	8th	Election invalidated
John P. Hungerford	Democratic-Republican	March 4, 1813 - March 3, 1817	9th	[data missing]
Robert M. T. Hunter	Whig	March 4, 1837 - March 3, 1843	9th	[data missing]
Robert M. T. Hunter	Democratic	March 4, 1845 - March 3, 1847	8th	[data missing]
Eppa Hunton Jr.	Democratic	March 4, 1873 - March 3, 1881	8th	[data missing]
Robert Hurt	Republican	January 3, 2011 - January 3, 2017	5th	[data missing]
Edward B. Jackson	Democratic-Republican	October 23, 1820 - March 3, 1823	1st	[data missing]
George Jackson	Democratic-Republican	March 4, 1795 - March 3, 1797	3rd	[data missing]
George Jackson	Democratic-Republican	March 4, 1799 - March 3, 1803	3rd	[data missing]
John G. Jackson	Democratic-Republican	March 4, 1803 - September 28, 1810	1st	Resigned
John G. Jackson	Democratic-Republican	March 4, 1813 - March 3, 1817	1st	[data missing]
Rorer A. James	Democratic	June 1, 1920 - August 6, 1921	5th	Died
Albert G. Jenkins	Democratic	March 4, 1857 - March 3, 1861	11th	[data missing]
William P. Jennings	Democratic	January 3, 1955 - January 3, 1967	9th	[data missing]
James Johnson	Democratic-Republican	March 4, 1813 - February 1, 1820	20th	[data missing]
Joseph Johnson	Democratic-Republican	March 4, 1823 - March 3, 1825	18th	[data missing]
Joseph Johnson	Jacksonian	March 4, 1825 - March 4, 1827	18th	[data missing]
Joseph Johnson	Jacksonian	January 21, 1833 - March 4, 1833	18th	[data missing]
Joseph Johnson	Jacksonian	March 4, 1835 - March 3, 1837	20th	[data missing]
Joseph Johnson	Democratic	March 4, 1837 - March 3, 1841	20th	[data missing]
Joseph Johnson	Democratic	March 4, 1845 - March 3, 1847	14th	[data missing]
Charles C. Johnston	Jacksonian	March 4, 1831 - June 17, 1832	22nd	Died
Joseph E. Johnston	Democratic	March 4, 1879 - March 3, 1881	3rd	[data missing]
James Jones	Democratic-Republican	March 4, 1819 - March 3, 1823	19th	[data missing]
John W. Jones	Jacksonian	March 4, 1835 - March 3, 1837	3rd	[data missing]
John W. Jones	Democratic	March 4, 1837 - March 3, 1843	3rd	[data missing]
John W. Jones	Democratic	March 4, 1843 - March 3, 1845	6th	[data missing]
Walter Jones	Democratic-Republican	March 4, 1797 - March 3, 1799	19th	[data missing]
Walter Jones	Democratic-Republican	March 4, 1803 - March 3, 1811	8th	[data missing]
William A. Jones	Democratic	March 4, 1891 - April 17, 1918	1st	Died
Joseph Jorgensen	Republican	March 4, 1877 - March 3, 1883	4th	[data missing]
John Kerr	Democratic-Republican	March 4, 1813 - March 4, 1815	15th	[data missing]
John Kerr	Democratic-Republican	October 30, 1815 - March 3, 1817	15th	[data missing]
Zedekiah Kidwell	Democratic	March 4, 1853 - March 3, 1857	10th	[data missing]
Jen Kiggans	Republican	January 3, 2023 – present	2nd	Incumbent
John Lamb	Democratic	March 4, 1897 - March 3, 1913	3rd	[data missing]
John M. Langston	Republican	September 23, 1890 - March 3, 1891	4th	[data missing]
Menalcus Lankford	Republican	March 4, 1929 –March 4, 1933	2nd	[data missing]
Francis R. Lassiter	Democratic	April 19, 1900 - March 3, 1903	4th	[data missing]
Francis R. Lassiter	Democratic	March 4, 1907 - October 31, 1909	4th	Died
John W. Lawson	Democratic	March 4, 1891 - March 3, 1893	2nd	[data missing]
Shelton F. Leake	Democratic	March 4, 1845 - March 3, 1847	5th	[data missing]
Shelton F. Leake	Independent Democratic	March 4, 1859 - March 3, 1861	6th	[data missing]
Henry Lee	Federalist	March 4, 1799 - March 3, 1801	19th	[data missing]
Richard B. Lee	Pro-Administration	March 4, 1789 - March 3, 1793	4th	[data missing]
Richard B. Lee	Pro-Administration	March 4, 1793 - March 3, 1795	17th	[data missing]
William H. F. Lee	Democratic	March 4, 1887 - October 15, 1891	8th	Died
Isaac Leffler	Anti-Jacksonian	March 4, 1827 - March 3, 1829	18th	[data missing]
Jabez Leftwich	Democratic-Republican	March 4, 1821 - March 3, 1823	14th	[data missing]
Jabez Leftwich	Democratic-Republican	March 4, 1823 - March 3, 1825	7th	[data missing]
Posey G. Lester	Democratic	March 4, 1889 - March 3, 1893	5th	[data missing]
John Letcher	Democratic	March 4, 1851 - March 3, 1853	11th	[data missing]
John Letcher	Democratic	March 4, 1853 - March 3, 1859	9th	[data missing]
Charles S. Lewis	Democratic	December 4, 1854 - March 3, 1855	11th	[data missing]
Joseph Lewis Jr.	Federalist	March 4, 1803 - March 3, 1813	7th	[data missing]
Joseph Lewis Jr.	Federalist	March 4, 1813 - March 3, 1817	8th	[data missing]
Thomas Lewis Jr.	Federalist	March 4, 1803 - March 5, 1804	5th	Election invalidated
William J. Lewis	Democratic-Republican	March 4, 1817 - March 3, 1819	15th	[data missing]
Harry Libbey	Readjuster	March 4, 1883 - March 3, 1885	2nd	[data missing]
Harry Libbey	Republican	March 4, 1885 - March 3, 1887	2nd	[data missing]
John Love	Democratic-Republican	March 4, 1807 - March 3, 1811	9th	[data missing]
George Loyall	Jacksonian	March 9, 1830 - March 3, 1831	1st	[data missing]
George Loyall	Democratic	March 4, 1833 - March 3, 1837	1st	[data missing]
Edward Lucas	Jacksonian	March 4, 1833 - March 3, 1837	15th	[data missing]
William Lucas	Democratic	March 4, 1839 - March 3, 1841	15th	[data missing]
William Lucas	Democratic	March 4, 1843 - March 3, 1845	10th	[data missing]
Elaine Luria	Democratic	January 3, 2019 - January 3, 2023	2nd	Lost re-election to Kiggans
James Machir	Federalist	March 4, 1797 - March 3, 1799	3rd	[data missing]
James Madison	Anti-Administration	March 4, 1789 - March 3, 1793	5th	[data missing]
James Madison	Anti-Administration	March 4, 1793 - March 3, 1795	15th	[data missing]
James Madison	Democratic-Republican	March 4, 1795 - March 3, 1797	15th	[data missing]
Francis Mallory	Whig	March 4, 1837 - March 3, 1839	1st	[data missing]
Francis Mallory	Whig	December 28, 1840 - March 3, 1843	1st	[data missing]
John O. Marsh Jr.	Democratic	January 3, 1963 - January 3, 1971	7th	[data missing]
James W. Marshall	Democratic	March 4, 1893 - March 3, 1895	9th	[data missing]
John Marshall	Federalist	March 4, 1799 - June 7, 1800	13th	Appointed US Secretary of State
Elbert S. Martin	Independent Democratic	March 4, 1859 - March 3, 1861	13th	[data missing]
James M. Mason	Democratic	March 4, 1837 - March 3, 1839	15th	[data missing]
John Y. Mason	Jacksonian	March 4, 1831 - January 11, 1837	2nd	Resigned
Lewis Maxwell	Anti-Jacksonian	March 4, 1827 - March 3, 1829	21st	[data missing]
Lewis Maxwell	Anti-Jacksonian	March 4, 1829 - March 3, 1833	21st	[data missing]
Harry L. Maynard	Democratic	March 4, 1901 - March 3, 1911	2nd	[data missing]
Robert M. Mayo	Readjuster	March 4, 1883 - March 20, 1884	1st	Election invalidated
William M. McCarty	Whig	January 25, 1840 - March 3, 1841	14th	[data missing]
Jennifer McClellan	Democratic	February 21, 2023 – present	4th	Elected in 2023 to complete the term of McEachin. Incumbent.
William McComas	Jacksonian	March 4, 1833 - March 3, 1835	19th	[data missing]
William McComas	Anti-Jacksonian	March 4, 1835 - March 3, 1837	19th	[data missing]
William McCoy	Democratic-Republican	March 4, 1811 - March 3, 1823	4th	[data missing]
William McCoy	Democratic-Republican	March 4, 1823 - March 3, 1825	19th	[data missing]
William McCoy	Jacksonian	March 4, 1825 - March 3, 1833	19th	[data missing]
James McDowell	Democratic	March 6, 1846 - March 3, 1851	11th	[data missing]
Donald McEachin	Democratic	January 3, 2017 - November 28, 2022	4th	Died
John McGuire	Republican	January 3, 2025 – present	5th	Incumbent
William R. McKenney	Democratic	March 4, 1895 - May 3, 1896	4th	Election invalidated
Lewis McKenzie	Unionist	February 16, 1863 - March 4, 1863	7th	[data missing]
Lewis McKenzie	Conservative	January 31, 1870 - March 3, 1871	7th	[data missing]
William McKinley	Democratic-Republican	December 21, 1810 - March 3, 1811	1st	[data missing]
LaFayette McMullen	Democratic	March 4, 1849 - March 3, 1857	13th	[data missing]
Richard K. Meade	Democratic	August 5, 1847 - March 3, 1853	2nd	[data missing]
Charles F. Mercer	Federalist	March 4, 1817 - March 3, 1823	8th	[data missing]
Charles F. Mercer	Democratic-Republican	March 4, 1823 - March 3, 1825	14th	[data missing]
Charles F. Mercer	Anti-Jacksonian	March 4, 1825 - March 3, 1829	14th	[data missing]
Charles F. Mercer	Anti-Jacksonian	March 4, 1829 - March 3, 1837	14th	[data missing]
Charles F. Mercer	Whig	March 4, 1837 - December 26, 1839	14th	Resigned
Elisha E. Meredith	Democratic	December 9, 1891 - March 3, 1897	8th	[data missing]
John S. Millson	Democratic	March 4, 1849 - March 3, 1853	1st	[data missing]
John S. Millson	Democratic	March 4, 1853 - March 3, 1861	2nd	[data missing]
William Milnes Jr.	Conservative	January 27, 1870 - March 3, 1871	6th	[data missing]
Andrew J. Montague	Democratic	March 4, 1913 - March 3, 1933	3rd	[data missing]
Andrew J. Montague	Democratic	March 4, 1933 - January 3, 1935	At-large	[data missing]
Andrew J. Montague	Democratic	January 3, 1935 - January 24, 1937	3rd	Died
Andrew Moore	Anti-Administration	March 4, 1789 - March 3, 1793	3rd	[data missing]
Andrew Moore	Anti-Administration	March 4, 1793 - March 3, 1795	2nd	[data missing]
Andrew Moore	Democratic-Republican	March 4, 1795 - March 3, 1797	2nd	[data missing]
Andrew Moore	Democratic-Republican	March 5, 1804 - August 11, 1804	5th	Appointed to the US Senate
R. Walton Moore	Democratic	April 27, 1919 - March 3, 1931	8th	[data missing]
Samuel M. Moore	Anti-Jacksonian	March 4, 1833 - March 3, 1835	17th	[data missing]
Thomas Love Moore	Democratic-Republican	November 13, 1820 - March 3, 1823	10th	[data missing]
James P. Moran Jr.	Democratic	January 3, 1991 - January 3, 2015	8th	[data missing]
Daniel Morgan	Federalist	March 4, 1797 - March 3, 1799	1st	[data missing]
William S. Morgan	Jacksonian	March 4, 1835 - March 3, 1837	21st	[data missing]
William S. Morgan	Democratic	March 4, 1837 - March 3, 1839	21st	[data missing]
John Morrow	Democratic-Republican	March 4, 1805 - March 3, 1809	2nd	[data missing]
Jeremiah Morton	Whig	March 4, 1849 - March 3, 1851	9th	[data missing]
Hugh Nelson	Democratic-Republican	March 4, 1811 - March 3, 1813	21st	[data missing]
Hugh Nelson	Democratic-Republican	March 4, 1813 - January 14, 1823	22nd	Appointed Minister to Spain
Thomas M. Nelson	Democratic-Republican	December 4, 1816 - March 3, 1819	18th	[data missing]
Joseph Neville	Anti-Administration	March 4, 1793 - March 3, 1795	3rd	[data missing]
Anthony New	Anti-Administration	March 4, 1793 - March 3, 1795	16th	[data missing]
Anthony New	Democratic-Republican	March 4, 1795 - March 3, 1803	16th	[data missing]
Anthony New	Democratic-Republican	March 4, 1803 - March 3, 1805	11th	[data missing]
Alexander Newman	Democratic	March 4, 1849 - September 8, 1849	15th	Died
Thomas Newton Jr.	Democratic-Republican	March 4, 1801 - March 3, 1803	11th	[data missing]
Thomas Newton Jr.	Democratic-Republican	March 4, 1803 - March 3, 1813	20th	[data missing]
Thomas Newton Jr.	Democratic-Republican	March 4, 1813 - March 3, 1823	21st	[data missing]
Thomas Newton Jr.	Democratic-Republican	March 4, 1823 - March 3, 1825	1st	[data missing]
Thomas Newton Jr.	Anti-Jacksonian	March 4, 1825 - March 3, 1829	1st	[data missing]
Thomas Newton Jr.	Anti-Jacksonian	March 4, 1829 - March 9, 1830	1st	Election invalidated
Thomas Newton Jr.	Anti-Jacksonian	March 4, 1831 - March 3, 1833	1st	[data missing]
Willoughby Newton	Whig	March 4, 1843 - March 3, 1845	8th	[data missing]
John Nicholas	Anti-Administration	March 4, 1793 - March 3, 1795	18th	[data missing]
John Nicholas	Democratic-Republican	March 4, 1795 - March 3, 1801	18th	[data missing]
Wilson C. Nicholas	Democratic-Republican	March 4, 1807 - March 3, 1809	21st	[data missing]
Glenn Nye	Democratic	January 3, 2009 - January 3, 2011	2nd	[data missing]
Charles T. O'Ferrall	Democratic	May 5, 1884 - December 28, 1893	7th	Resigned after being elected Governor of Virginia
James R. Olin	Democratic	January 3, 1983 - January 3, 1993	6th	[data missing]
Peter J. Otey	Democratic	March 4, 1895 - May 4, 1902	6th	Died
John Page	Anti-Administration	March 4, 1789 - March 3, 1793	7th	[data missing]
John Page	Anti-Administration	March 4, 1793 - March 3, 1795	12th	[data missing]
John Page	Democratic-Republican	March 4, 1795 - March 3, 1797	12th	[data missing]
Robert Page	Federalist	March 4, 1799 - March 3, 1801	1st	[data missing]
Josiah Parker	Anti-Administration	March 4, 1789 - March 3, 1793	8th	[data missing]
Josiah Parker	Pro-Administration	March 4, 1793 - March 3, 1795	11th	[data missing]
Josiah Parker	Federalist	March 4, 1795 - March 3, 1801	11th	[data missing]
Richard Parker	Democratic	March 4, 1849 - March 3, 1851	10th	[data missing]
Severn E. Parker	Democratic-Republican	March 4, 1819 - March 3, 1821	13th	[data missing]
Stanford E. Parris	Republican	January 3, 1973 - January 3, 1975	8th	[data missing]
Stanford E. Parris	Republican	January 3, 1981 - January 3, 1991	8th	[data missing]
John M. Patton	Jacksonian	November 25, 1830 - March 3, 1833	11th	[data missing]
John M. Patton	Jacksonian	March 4, 1833 - March 3, 1837	13th	[data missing]
John M. Patton	Democratic	March 4, 1837 - April 7, 1838	13th	Resigned
John Paul	Readjuster	March 4, 1881 - March 3, 1883	7th	[data missing]
John Paul Jr.	Republican	December 15, 1922 - March 3, 1923	7th	[data missing]
Lewis F. Payne Jr.	Democratic	June 14, 1988 - January 3, 1997	5th	[data missing]
George C. Peery	Democratic	March 4, 1923 - March 3, 1929	9th	[data missing]
John Pegram	Democratic-Republican	April 21, 1818 - March 3, 1819	19th	[data missing]
John S. Pendleton	Whig	March 4, 1845 - March 3, 1849	9th	[data missing]
Isaac S. Pennybacker	Democratic	March 4, 1837 - March 3, 1839	16th	[data missing]
Tom Perriello	Democratic	January 3, 2009 - January 3, 2011	5th	[data missing]
Owen B. Pickett	Democratic	January 3, 1987 - January 3, 2001	2nd	[data missing]
James Pindall	Federalist	March 4, 1817 - July 26, 1820	1st	Resigned
James H. Platt Jr.	Republican	January 27, 1870 - March 3, 1875	2nd	[data missing]
James Pleasants	Democratic-Republican	March 4, 1811 - March 3, 1813	16th	[data missing]
James Pleasants	Democratic-Republican	March 4, 1813 - December 14, 1819	17th	Resigned after being elected to the US Senate
Richard H. Poff	Republican	January 3, 1953 - August 29, 1972	6th	Appointed Virginia Supreme Court justice
Charles H. Porter	Republican	January 27, 1870 - March 3, 1873	3rd	[data missing]
Alfred H. Powell	Anti-Jacksonian	March 4, 1825 - March 3, 1827	17th	[data missing]
Cuthbert Powell	Whig	March 4, 1841 - March 3, 1843	14th	[data missing]
Leven Powell	Federalist	March 4, 1799 - March 3, 1801	17th	[data missing]
Paulus Powell	Democratic	March 4, 1849 - March 3, 1853	5th	[data missing]
Paulus Powell	Democratic	March 4, 1853 - March 3, 1859	6th	[data missing]
Francis Preston	Anti-Administration	March 4, 1793 - March 3, 1795	4th	[data missing]
Francis Preston	Democratic-Republican	March 4, 1795 - March 3, 1797	4th	[data missing]
William B. Preston	Whig	March 4, 1847 - March 3, 1849	12th	[data missing]
Auburn L. Pridemore	Democratic	March 4, 1877 - March 3, 1879	9th	[data missing]
Roger A. Pryor	Democratic	December 7, 1859 - March 3, 1861	4th	[data missing]
Julian M. Quarles	Democratic	March 4, 1899 - March 3, 1901	10th	[data missing]
John Randolph	Democratic-Republican	March 4, 1799 - March 3, 1803	7th	[data missing]
John Randolph	Democratic-Republican	March 4, 1803 - March 3, 1813	15th	[data missing]
John Randolph	Democratic-Republican	March 4, 1815 - March 3, 1817	16th	[data missing]
John Randolph	Democratic-Republican	March 4, 1819 - March 3, 1823	16th	[data missing]
John Randolph	Democratic-Republican	March 4, 1823 - March 3, 1825	5th	[data missing]
John Randolph	Jacksonian	March 4, 1825 - December 26, 1825	5th	[data missing]
John Randolph	Jacksonian	March 4, 1827 - March 3, 1829	5th	[data missing]
John Randolph	Jacksonian	March 4, 1833 - May 24, 1833	5th	Died
Thomas M. Randolph Jr.	Democratic-Republican	March 4, 1803 - March 3, 1807	21st	[data missing]
William F. Rhea	Democratic	March 4, 1899 - March 3, 1903	9th	[data missing]
James B. Richmond	Democratic	March 4, 1879 - March 3, 1881	9th	[data missing]
Robert Ridgway	Conservative	January 27, 1870 - October 16, 1870	5th	Died
Scott Rigell	Republican	January 3, 2011 - January 3, 2017	2nd	[data missing]
Denver Riggleman	Republican	January 3, 2019 - January 3, 2021	5th	Lost Re-nomination to Good
Francis E. Rives	Democratic	March 4, 1837 - March 3, 1841	2nd	[data missing]
William C. Rives	Democratic-Republican	March 4, 1823 - March 3, 1825	10th	[data missing]
William C. Rives	Jacksonian	March 4, 1825 - April 17, 1829	10th	Resigned after being appointed U.S. Minister to France
John F. Rixey	Democratic	March 4, 1897 - February 8, 1907	8th	Died
John Roane	Democratic-Republican	March 4, 1809 - March 3, 1813	11th	[data missing]
John Roane	Democratic-Republican	March 4, 1813 - March 3, 1815	12th	[data missing]
John Roane	Jacksonian	March 4, 1827 - March 3, 1831	12th	[data missing]
John Roane	Jacksonian	March 4, 1835 - March 3, 1837	9th	[data missing]
John J. Roane	Jacksonian	March 4, 1831 - March 3, 1833	12th	[data missing]
William H. Roane	Democratic-Republican	March 4, 1815 - March 3, 1817	12th	[data missing]
A. Willis Robertson	Democratic	March 4, 1933 - January 3, 1935	At-large	[data missing]
A. Willis Robertson	Democratic	January 3, 1935 - November 5, 1946	7th	Elected to the US Senate
John Robertson	Anti-Jacksonian	December 8, 1834 - March 3, 1837	11th	[data missing]
John Robertson	Whig	March 4, 1837 - March 3, 1839	11th	[data missing]
Edward J. Robeson Jr.	Democratic	May 2, 1950 - January 3, 1959	1st	[data missing]
J. Kenneth Robinson	Republican	January 3, 1971 - January 3, 1985	7th	[data missing]
Robert Rutherford	Anti-Administration	March 4, 1793 - March 3, 1795	1st	[data missing]
Robert Rutherford	Democratic-Republican	March 4, 1795 - March 3, 1797	1st	[data missing]
Green B. Samuels	Democratic	March 4, 1839 - March 3, 1841	16th	[data missing]
David E. Satterfield Jr.	Democratic	November 2, 1937 - February 15, 1945	3rd	Resigned
David E. Satterfield III	Democratic	January 3, 1965 - January 3, 1981	3rd	[data missing]
Edward W. Saunders	Democratic	November 6, 1906 - February 29, 1920	5th	Elected Virginia Supreme Court justice
Edward L. Schrock	Republican	January 3, 2001 - January 3, 2005	2nd	[data missing]
Robert C. Scott	Democratic	January 3, 1993 – present	3rd	Incumbent
William L. Scott	Republican	January 3, 1967 - January 3, 1973	8th	[data missing]
James A. Seddon	Democratic	March 4, 1845 - March 3, 1847	6th	[data missing]
James A. Seddon	Democratic	March 4, 1849 - March 3, 1851	6th	[data missing]
Joseph E. Segar	Unionist	March 16, 1862 - March 3, 1863	1st	[data missing]
James B. Sener	Republican	March 4, 1873 - March 3, 1875	1st	[data missing]
Joseph C. Shaffer	Republican	March 4, 1929 - March 3, 1931	9th	[data missing]
Daniel Sheffey	Federalist	March 4, 1809 - March 3, 1817	6th	[data missing]
Norman Sisisky	Democratic	January 3, 1983 - March 29, 2001	4th	Died
D. French Slaughter Jr.	Republican	January 3, 1985 - November 5, 1991	7th	Resigned
Campbell Slemp	Republican	March 4, 1903 - October 13, 1907	9th	Died
C. Bascom Slemp	Republican	December 17, 1907 - March 3, 1923	9th	[data missing]
Arthur Smith	Democratic-Republican	March 4, 1821 - March 3, 1823	20th	[data missing]
Arthur Smith	Democratic-Republican	March 4, 1823 - March 3, 1825	2nd	[data missing]
Ballard Smith	Democratic-Republican	March 4, 1815 - March 3, 1821	7th	[data missing]
Howard W. Smith	Democratic	March 4, 1931 - March 3, 1933	8th	[data missing]
Howard W. Smith	Democratic	March 4, 1933 - January 3, 1935	At-large	[data missing]
Howard W. Smith	Democratic	January 3, 1935 - January 3, 1967	8th	[data missing]
John Smith	Democratic-Republican	March 4, 1801 - March 3, 1803	1st	[data missing]
John Smith	Democratic-Republican	March 4, 1803 - March 3, 1815	3rd	[data missing]
John A. Smith	Republican	March 4, 1873 - March 3, 1875	3rd	[data missing]
William Smith	Democratic-Republican	March 4, 1821 - March 3, 1823	7th	[data missing]
William Smith	Democratic-Republican	March 4, 1823 - March 3, 1825	21st	[data missing]
William Smith	Jacksonian	March 4, 1825 - March 3, 1827	21st	[data missing]
William Smith	Democratic	December 6, 1841 - March 3, 1843	13th	[data missing]
William Smith	Democratic	March 4, 1853 - March 3, 1861	7th	Resigned
Alexander Smyth	Democratic-Republican	March 4, 1817 - March 3, 1823	6th	[data missing]
Alexander Smyth	Democratic-Republican	March 4, 1823 - March 3, 1825	22nd	[data missing]
Alexander Smyth	Jacksonian	March 4, 1827 - April 17, 1830	22nd	Died
Alexander Smyth	Jacksonian	1829-1830	22nd	Died in office
John F. Snodgrass	Democratic	March 4, 1853 - June 5, 1854	11th	Died
Robert G. Southall	Democratic	March 4, 1903 - March 3, 1907	4th	[data missing]
Abigail Spanberger	Democratic	January 3, 2019 - January 3, 2025	7th	Retired to run for governor.
Thomas B. Stanley	Democratic	November 5, 1946 - February 3, 1953	5th	Resigned to run for Governor of Virginia
Lewis Steenrod	Democratic	March 4, 1839 - March 3, 1843	21st	[data missing]
Lewis Steenrod	Democratic	March 4, 1843 - March 3, 1845	15th	[data missing]
James Stephenson	Federalist	March 4, 1803 - March 3, 1805	2nd	[data missing]
James Stephenson	Federalist	March 4, 1809 - March 3, 1811	2nd	[data missing]
James Stephenson	Federalist	October 28, 1822 - March 3, 1823	2nd	[data missing]
James Stephenson	Federalist	March 4, 1823 - March 3, 1825	16th	[data missing]
Andrew Stevenson	Democratic-Republican	March 4, 1821 - March 3, 1823	23rd	[data missing]
Andrew Stevenson	Democratic-Republican	March 4, 1823 - March 3, 1825	9th	[data missing]
Andrew Stevenson	Jacksonian	March 4, 1825 - March 3, 1833	9th	[data missing]
Andrew Stevenson	Jacksonian	March 4, 1833 - June 2, 1834	11th	Resigned
William H. H. Stowell	Republican	March 4, 1871 - March 3, 1877	4th	[data missing]
John Stratton	Federalist	March 4, 1801 - March 3, 1803	12th	[data missing]
George F. Strother	Democratic-Republican	March 4, 1817 - February 10, 1820	10th	Resigned
James F. Strother	Whig	March 4, 1851 - March 3, 1853	9th	[data missing]
Alexander H. H. Stuart	Whig	March 4, 1841 - March 3, 1843	17th	[data missing]
Archibald Stuart	Democratic	March 4, 1837 - March 3, 1839	7th	[data missing]
Suhas Subramanyam	Democratic	January 3, 2025 – present	10th	Incumbent
George W. Summers	Whig	March 4, 1841 - March 3, 1843	19th	[data missing]
George W. Summers	Whig	March 4, 1843 - March 3, 1845	14th	[data missing]
Claude A. Swanson	Democratic	March 4, 1893 - January 30, 1906	5th	Elected Governor of Virginia
Jacob Swoope	Federalist	March 4, 1809 - March 3, 1811	4th	[data missing]
John Taliaferro	Democratic-Republican	March 4, 1801 - March 3, 1803	19th	[data missing]
John Taliaferro	Democratic-Republican	November 29, 1811 - March 3, 1813	8th	[data missing]
John Taliaferro	Democratic-Republican	March 24, 1824 - March 3, 1825	13th	[data missing]
John Taliaferro	Anti-Jacksonian	March 4, 1825 - March 3, 1829	13th	[data missing]
John Taliaferro	Anti-Jacksonian	March 4, 1829 - March 3, 1831	13th	[data missing]
John Taliaferro	Anti-Jacksonian	March 4, 1835 - March 3, 1837	10th	[data missing]
John Taliaferro	Whig	March 4, 1837 - March 3, 1843	10th	[data missing]
Magnus Tate	Federalist	March 4, 1815 - March 3, 1817	2nd	[data missing]
Robert Taylor	Anti-Jacksonian	March 4, 1825 - March 3, 1827	11th	[data missing]
Scott Taylor	Republican	January 3, 2017 - January 3, 2019	2nd	[data missing]
William Taylor	Democratic	March 4, 1843 - January 17, 1846	11th	Died
William P. Taylor	Anti-Jacksonian	March 4, 1833 - March 3, 1835	9th	[data missing]
Littleton W. Tazewell	Democratic-Republican	November 26, 1800 - March 3, 1801	13th	[data missing]
William Terry	Democratic	March 4, 1871 –March 4, 1873	8th	[data missing]
William Terry	Democratic	March 4, 1875 - March 3, 1877	9th	[data missing]
Christopher Y. Thomas	Republican	March 5, 1874 - March 3, 1875	5th	[data missing]
George W. Thompson	Democratic	March 4, 1851 - July 30, 1852	15th	Resigned to become Circuit Court judge
Philip R. Thompson	Democratic-Republican	March 4, 1801 - March 3, 1803	18th	[data missing]
Philip R. Thompson	Democratic-Republican	March 4, 1803 - March 3, 1807	9th	[data missing]
Robert A. Thompson	Democratic	March 4, 1847 - March 3, 1849	14th	[data missing]
Robert T. Thorp	Republican	May 2, 1896 - March 3, 1897	4th	[data missing]
Robert T. Thorp	Republican	March 23, 1898 - March 3, 1899	4th	[data missing]
William M. Tredway	Democratic	March 4, 1845 - March 3, 1847	3rd	[data missing]
James Trezvant	Jacksonian	March 4, 1825 - March 3, 1831	2nd	[data missing]
Paul S. Trible Jr.	Republican	January 3, 1977 - January 3, 1983	1st	[data missing]
Abram Trigg	Democratic-Republican	March 4, 1797 - March 3, 1803	4th	[data missing]
Abram Trigg	Democratic-Republican	March 4, 1803 - March 3, 1809	6th	[data missing]
Connally F. Trigg	Democratic	March 4, 1885 - March 3, 1887	9th	[data missing]
John J. Trigg	Democratic-Republican	March 4, 1797 - March 3, 1803	5th	[data missing]
John J. Trigg	Democratic-Republican	March 4, 1803 - May 17, 1804	13th	Died
William M. Tuck	Democratic	April 14, 1953 - January 3, 1969	5th	[data missing]
George Tucker	Democratic-Republican	March 4, 1819 - March 3, 1823	15th	[data missing]
George Tucker	Democratic-Republican	March 4, 1823 - March 3, 1825	6th	[data missing]
Henry S. Tucker	Democratic-Republican	March 4, 1815 - March 3, 1819	3rd	[data missing]
Henry S. Tucker III	Democratic	March 4, 1889 - March 3, 1897	10th	[data missing]
Henry S. Tucker III	Democratic	March 21, 1922 - July 23, 1932	10th	Died
John R. Tucker	Democratic	March 4, 1875 - March 3, 1885	6th	[data missing]
John R. Tucker	Democratic	March 4, 1885 - March 3, 1887	10th	[data missing]
Robert Turnbull	Democratic	March 8, 1910 - March 3, 1913	4th	[data missing]
Smith S. Turner	Democratic	January 30, 1894 - March 3, 1897	7th	[data missing]
D. Gardiner Tyler	Democratic	March 4, 1893 - March 3, 1897	2nd	[data missing]
John Tyler Jr.	Democratic-Republican	December 17, 1816 - March 3, 1821	23rd	[data missing]
Charles H. Upton	Unionist	May 23, 1861 - February 27, 1862	7th	Election invalidated
Thomas Van Swearingen	Federalist	March 4, 1819 - August 19, 1822	2nd	Died
Abraham B. Venable	Anti-Administration	March 4, 1791 - March 3, 1793	6th	[data missing]
Abraham B. Venable	Anti-Administration	March 4, 1793 - March 3, 1795	7th	[data missing]
Abraham B. Venable	Democratic-Republican	March 4, 1795 - March 3, 1799	7th	[data missing]
Edward C. Venable	Democratic	March 4, 1889 - September 23, 1890	4th	Election invalidated
Eugene Vindman	Democratic	January 3, 2025 – present	7th	Incumbent
Edmund Waddill Jr.	Republican	April 12, 1890 - March 3, 1891	3rd	[data missing]
James Walkinshaw	Democratic	September 9, 2025 – present	11th	Elected in 2025 to complete the term of Connolly. Incumbent.
Francis Walker	Anti-Administration	March 4, 1793 - March 3, 1795	14th	[data missing]
Gilbert C. Walker	Democratic	March 4, 1875 - March 3, 1879	3rd	[data missing]
James A. Walker	Republican	March 4, 1895 - March 3, 1899	9th	[data missing]
William C. Wampler	Republican	January 3, 1953 - January 3, 1955	9th	[data missing]
William C. Wampler	Republican	January 3, 1967 - January 3, 1983	9th	[data missing]
Walter A. Watson	Democratic	March 4, 1913 - December 24, 1919	4th	Died
Jennifer Wexton	Democratic	January 3, 2019 - January 3, 2025	10th	Retired.
Kellian V. Whaley	Unionist	March 4, 1861 - March 3, 1863	12th	[data missing]
Alexander White	Pro-Administration	March 4, 1789 - March 3, 1793	1st	[data missing]
Francis White	Federalist	March 4, 1813 - March 3, 1815	2nd	[data missing]
Joseph Whitehead	Democratic	March 4, 1925 - March 3, 1931	5th	[data missing]
Thomas Whitehead	Democratic	March 4, 1873 - March 3, 1875	6th	[data missing]
G. William Whitehurst	Republican	January 3, 1969 - January 3, 1987	2nd	[data missing]
Jared Williams	Democratic-Republican	March 4, 1819 - March 3, 1823	3rd	[data missing]
Jared Williams	Democratic-Republican	March 4, 1823 - March 3, 1825	17th	[data missing]
Alexander Wilson	Democratic-Republican	December 4, 1804 - March 3, 1809	5th	[data missing]
Edgar C. Wilson	Anti-Jacksonian	March 4, 1833 - March 3, 1835	21st	[data missing]
Thomas Wilson	Federalist	March 4, 1811 - March 3, 1813	1st	[data missing]
George D. Wise	Democratic	March 4, 1881 - April 11, 1890	3rd	Election invalidated
George D. Wise	Democratic	March 4, 1891 - March 3, 1895	3rd	[data missing]
Henry A. Wise	Jacksonian	March 4, 1833 - March 3, 1837	8th	[data missing]
Henry A. Wise	Whig	March 4, 1837 - March 3, 1843	8th	[data missing]
Henry A. Wise	Democratic	March 4, 1843 - February 12, 1844	7th	Resigned
John S. Wise	Readjuster	March 4, 1883 - March 3, 1885	At-large	[data missing]
Richard A. Wise	Republican	April 26, 1898 - March 3, 1899	2nd	[data missing]
Richard A. Wise	Republican	March 12, 1900 - December 21, 1900	2nd	Died
Robert J. Wittman	Republican	December 11, 2007 – present	1st	Incumbent
Frank R. Wolf	Republican	January 3, 1981 - January 3, 2015	10th	[data missing]
Clifton A. Woodrum	Democratic	March 4, 1923 - March 3, 1933	6th	[data missing]
Clifton A. Woodrum	Democratic	March 4, 1933 - January 3, 1935	At-large	[data missing]
Clifton A. Woodrum	Democratic	January 3, 1935 - December 31, 1945	6th	Resigned
James P. Woods	Democratic	February 25, 1918 - March 3, 1923	6th	[data missing]
Jacob Yost	Republican	March 4, 1887 - March 3, 1889	10th	Lost re-election
Jacob Yost	Republican	March 4, 1897 - March 3, 1899	10th	[data missing]
William A. Young	Democratic	March 4, 1897 - April 26, 1898	2nd	Election invalidated
William A. Young	Democratic	March 4, 1899 - March 12, 1900	2nd	Election invalidated

== See also ==
- List of Confederate representatives from Virginia
- List of United States senators from Virginia
- Virginia's congressional delegations
- Virginia's congressional districts

== Sources ==
- House of Representatives List of Members
