= Elbert S. Martin =

American journalist

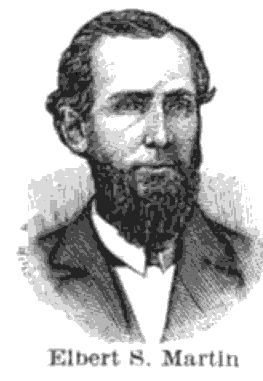

Member of the U.S. House of Representatives from Virginia's 13th district
- In office March 4, 1859 – March 3, 1861
- Preceded by: George W. Hopkins

Personal details
- Born: Elbert Sevier Martin; 1829 Jonesville, Virginia, U.S.
- Died: September 3, 1876 (aged 46–47) Dallas, Texas, U.S.

Elbert Sevier Martin (ca. 1829 – September 3, 1876) was a nineteenth-century Congressman and newspaper publisher from Virginia. He was the brother of John Preston Martin.

== Biography ==
Born near Jonesville, Virginia, Martin attended the public schools as a child and went on to attend Emory and Henry College from 1845 to 1848. He engaged in mercantile pursuits in Jonesville before being elected an Independent Democrat to the United States House of Representatives in 1858, serving from 1859 to 1861, being unsuccessful for reelection in 1860. Martin served in the Confederate Army during the Civil War as captain of a company of volunteers which was formed in his hometown of Jonesville. After the war, Martin moved to Dallas, Texas in 1870 and became interested in the newspaper publishing business. He died in Dallas on September 3, 1876.

U.S. House of Representatives
Preceded by George W. Hopkins	Member of the U.S. House of Representatives from Virginia's 13th congressional district March 4, 1859 – March 3, 1861 (obsolete district)	Succeeded by (none)
