= John Millson =

American politician

John S. Millson
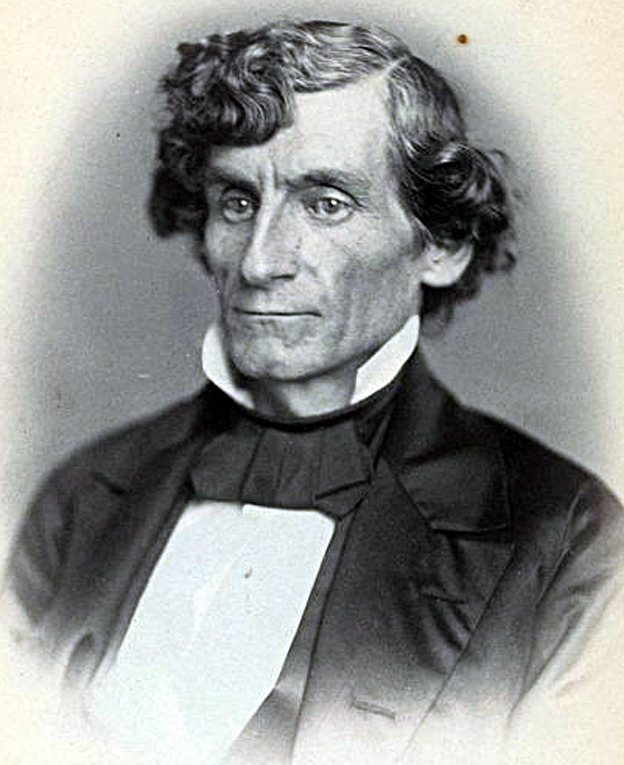

Member of the U.S. House of Representatives from Virginia
- In office March 4, 1849 – March 3, 1861
- Preceded by: Archibald Atkinson (1st); Richard K. Meade (2nd)
- Succeeded by: Thomas H. Bayly (1st); Vacant (2nd)
- Constituency: 1st district (1849-53); 2nd district (1853-61)

Chairman of the Committee on Revolutionary Pensions
- In office March 4, 1851 – March 3, 1853
- Preceded by: Loren P. Waldo
- Succeeded by: William Montgomery Churchwell

Personal details
- Born: John Singleton Millson; October 1, 1808 Norfolk, Virginia
- Died: March 1, 1874 (aged 65) Norfolk, Virginia
- Resting place: Cedar Grove Cemetery
- Occupation: Attorney

John Singleton Millson (October 1, 1808 – March 1, 1874) was an American lawyer and politician who served six consecutive terms as a U.S. representative from Virginia from 1849 to 1861.

== Biography ==
Born in Norfolk, Virginia, Millson pursued an academic course. He studied law. He was admitted to the bar in 1829 and commenced practice in Norfolk.

=== Congress ===
Millson was elected as a Democrat to the Thirty-first and to the five succeeding Congresses (March 4, 1849 – March 3, 1861). He served as chairman of the Committee on Revolutionary Pensions (Thirty-second Congress).

He is notable as of one of only two Southern Democrats to have voted against the Kansas-Nebraska Act, the other being Thomas Hart Benton.

=== Later career ===
After leaving Congress. Millson resumed the practice of law. He died in Norfolk, Virginia, March 1, 1874. He was interred in Cedar Grove Cemetery.

== Electoral history ==
- 1849; Millson was first elected to the U.S. House of Representatives with 51.67% of the vote, defeating a Whig identified only as Watts.
- 1851; Millson was re-elected with 59.58% of the vote, defeating Whig Leopold C.P. Cowper.
- 1853; Millson was re-elected with 56.68% of the vote, defeating Whig Johnathan R. Chambliss and Independent Democrat William D. Roberts.
- 1855; Millson was re-elected with 53.29% of the vote, defeating American Party Watts.
- 1857; Millson was re-elected unopposed.
- 1859; Millson was re-elected with 61.46% of the vote, defeating Independents identified only as Pretlow, Chandler, and Sykes.

== Sources ==
- United States Congress. "John Millson (id: M000780)". Biographical Directory of the United States Congress.

U.S. House of Representatives
Preceded by Archibald Atkinson	Member of the U.S. House of Representatives from Virginia's 1st congressional district 1849–1853	Succeeded by Thomas H. Bayly
Preceded by Richard K. Meade	Member of the U.S. House of Representatives from Virginia's 2nd congressional district 1853–1861	Succeeded by James H. Platt, Jr. (1870)
Political offices
Preceded by Loren P. Waldo; Connecticut	Chairman of House Revolutionary Pensions Committee; 1851–1853	Succeeded by William Montgomery Churchwell; Tennessee
