= Kendall Grove (Eastville, Virginia) =

Historic house in Virginia, United States

- U.S. National Register of Historic Places
- Virginia Landmarks Register
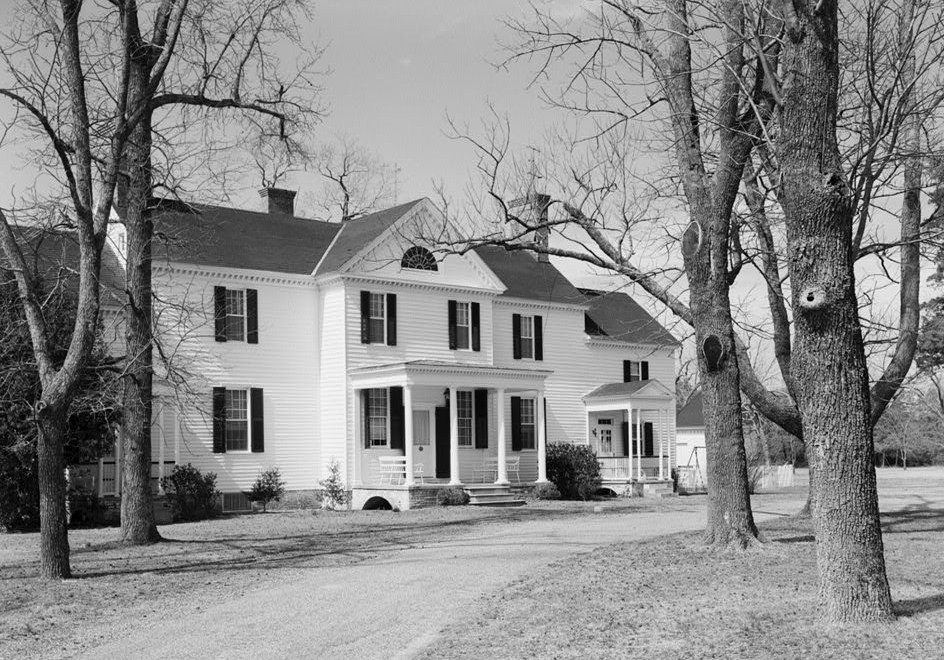
- Kendall Grove, HABS Photo

- Location within Virginia Location within the United States
- Location: VA 674, near Eastville, Virginia
- Coordinates: 37°22′56″N 75°56′35″W
- Area: 34 acres (14 ha)
- Built: c. 1813, c. 1840
- Architectural style: Greek Revival, Federal
- NRHP reference No.: 82004576
- VLR No.: 065-0060

Significant dates
- Added to NRHP: June 21, 1982
- Designated VLR: October 21, 1980

Kendall Grove is a historic plantation house located near Eastville, Virginia, United States. It was built about 1813, and is a two-story, Federal style wood-frame house with two-story projecting pavilions on the front and the rear and smaller two-story wings on each end added about 1840. It is cross-shaped in plan. The main house is joined by a long passage to a wood-frame kitchen-laundry. The house was improved about 1840, with the addition of Greek Revival style interior details. It was the home of Congressman and General Severn E. Parker. The home has the name of Colonel William Kendall, the original owner of the site.

It was listed on the National Register of Historic Places in 1982.
