= Richard Coke Jr. =

American congressman and lawyer (1790–1851)

Member of the U.S. House of Representatives from Virginia's 8th district
- In office March 4, 1829 – March 3, 1833
- Preceded by: Burwell Bassett
- Succeeded by: Henry A. Wise

Personal details
- Born: November 16, 1790 Williamsburg, Virginia, U.S.
- Died: March 31, 1851 (aged 60) Gloucester County, Virginia, U.S.
- Resting place: Gloucester County, Virginia, U.S.
- Party: Jacksonian
- Relatives: Richard Coke (nephew); Octavius Coke (nephew)
- Education: College of William & Mary
- Profession: Politician, lawyer

Richard Coke Jr. (November 16, 1790 – March 31, 1851) was a nineteenth-century congressman and lawyer from Virginia. He was the uncle of politicians Richard Coke and Octavius Coke.

Born in Williamsburg, Virginia, Coke pursued in preparatory studies as a young man. He graduated from the College of William & Mary, studied law and was admitted to the bar, commencing practice in Gloucester County, Virginia. He owned slaves. He was elected a Jacksonian to the United States House of Representatives in 1828, serving from 1829 to 1833. Coke died at his plantation called "Abingdon Place" in Gloucester County, Virginia, on March 31, 1851, and was interred in the family cemetery on the estate.

U.S. House of Representatives
Preceded by Burwell Bassett	Member of the U.S. House of Representatives from Virginia's 8th congressional district March 4, 1829 – March 4, 1833	Succeeded by Henry A. Wise
