= William A. Burwell =

American politician (1780–1821)

William Armisted Burwell
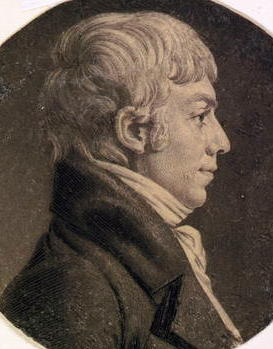

Member of the U.S. House of Representatives from Virginia
- In office December 1, 1806 – February 16, 1821
- Preceded by: Christopher H. Clark
- Succeeded by: Jabez Leftwich
- Constituency: 13th district (1806-1813); 14th district (1813-1821)

Private Secretary to the President
- In office 1804–1805
- President: Thomas Jefferson
- Preceded by: Lewis Harvie
- Succeeded by: Isaac Coles

Member of the Virginia House of Delegates for Franklin County
- In office December 3, 1804 – November 30, 1806 Serving with Henry T. Calloway
- Preceded by: Moses Greer
- Succeeded by: John Calloway

Personal details
- Born: March 15, 1780 Boydton, Virginia, U.S.
- Died: February 16, 1821 (aged 40) Washington, D.C., U.S.
- Party: Democratic-Republican
- Spouse: Letitia McCrury Burwell
- Children: William M. Burwell
- Profession: Politician, Secretary

William Armisted Burwell (March 15, 1780 – February 16, 1821) was a nineteenth-century Virginia politician and planter who served as presidential secretary and as a Democratic-Republican in the United States House of Representatives and the Virginia House of Delegates.

== Early and family life ==
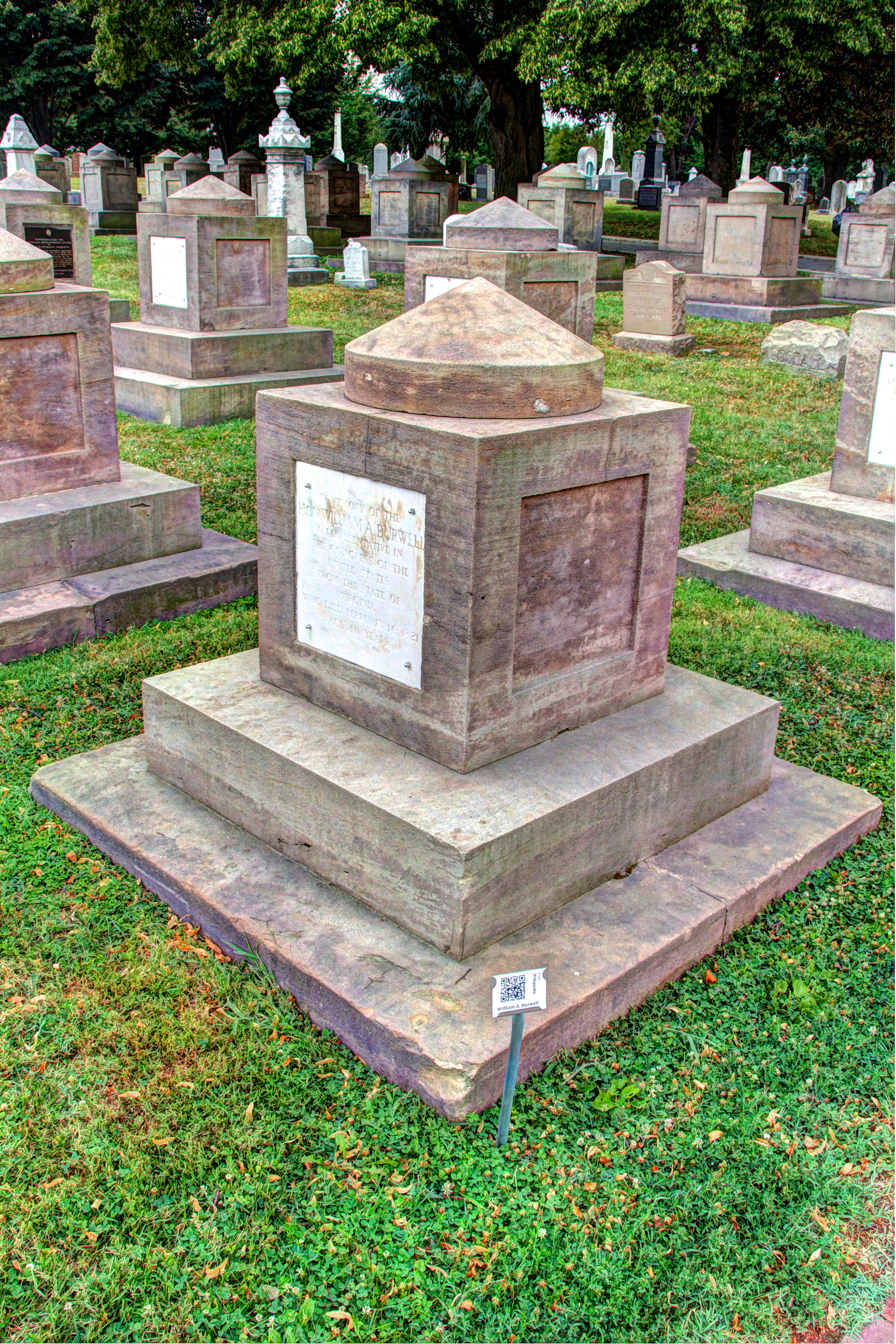
William Burwell's grave

Born near Boydton, Mecklenburg County to Thacker Burwell and his wife, the former Mary Armistead, Burwell was descended from the First Families of Virginia. He had an elder brother Edwin, who would move abroad. Burwell graduated from the College of William and Mary. He married Letitia McCreery (variously spelled McCreary, McCroory or McCrury) of Baltimore, who bore a son, William McCreery Burwell (1809-1888) before Burwell died at age 40.

== Career ==
After moving to Franklin County, Virginia, in 1802, Burwell became involved in politics and thrice won election to represent Franklin County in the Virginia House of Delegates, serving in that part time position from 1804 to 1806 alongside Henry T. Callaway before being succeeded by John Callaway after his election to the U.S. Congress. During that period, Meriwether Lewis retired as President Thomas Jefferson's private secretary to make his famous westward expedition, and Burwell would succeed him and move to Washington, D.C.

Burwell then sought election to the U.S. House of Representatives, and was elected as a Democratic-Republican to the United States House of Representatives to fill a vacancy. Burwell won re-election several times, serving from 1806 until his death.

In the 1810 census, Burwell owned 63 slaves in Franklin County and a decade later the household included 71 enslaved and 5 free colored persons about double the number owned by his cousin William Burwell of Frederick County to the north (son of Nathaniel Burwell). Oddly, after his death in 1821, this William A. Burwell still shows up in the 1830 census as owning 96 slaves, probably because his only child would not reach majority until November 1

In her 1974 biography of Jefferson, Fawn M. Brodie repeats a clergyman's claim that Burwell was an atheist and that he was expelled from New Jersey College for this reason and for "infidelity."

== Death and legacy ==
Burwell died on February 16, 1821, in Washington, D.C., and was interred in the Congressional Cemetery. His Franklin County home, the Burwell-Holland House, was listed on the National Register of Historic Places in 2002. His son William M. Burwell was born in Botetourt County, and spent some time as an editor in New Orleans, Louisiana before returning to Virginia, where he followed his father's planter and politician traditions and married an heiress from Bedford County. Ten times (with gaps), Bedford County voters elected William M. Burwell as one of their two representatives in the Virginia House of Delegates. Although he owned far fewer slaves than his father (only owning 11 slaves in 1860), he continued to serve as a legislator through the American Civil War. The younger Burwell secured subsidies for the Virginia and Tennessee Railroad, which passed through his Avenel farm in the county seat (then called Liberty, but which would expand after the American Civil War onto that property). William M. Burwell had four daughters and vigorously supported the Confederacy. His eldest, Letitia M. Burwell (1831–1905), wrote two books supporting the Lost Cause, the most famous being A Girl's Life in Virginia Before the War.

=== Other relatives ===
Another William A. Burwell, distantly related, owned slaves in and represented Patrick County, Virginia, in the Virginia House of Delegates after the death of this Congressman.

== See also ==
- List of members of the United States Congress who died in office (1790–1899)

U.S. House of Representatives
Preceded by Christopher H. Clark	Member of the U.S. House of Representatives from Virginia's 13th congressional district December 1, 1806 – March 3, 1813 (obsolete district)	Succeeded by Thomas M. Bayly
Preceded by Matthew Clay	Member of the U.S. House of Representatives from Virginia's 14th congressional district March 4, 1813 – February 16, 1821 (obsolete district)	Succeeded by Jabez Leftwich
