= Thomas Monteagle Bayly =

American politician (1775–1834)

Member of the U.S. House of Representatives from Virginia
- In office 1813–1815
- Preceded by: Burwell Bassett
- Succeeded by: Burwell Bassett
- Constituency: 13th district

Member of the Virginia House of Delegates for Accomac County
- In office December 1, 1828 – December 4, 1831 Serving with John P. Drummond
- Preceded by: Spencer D. Fletcher
- Succeeded by: Southey Ginalds
- In office December 6, 1819 – December 3, 1820 Serving with John P. Drummond
- Preceded by: John Finnie
- Succeeded by: James J. Teackle

Member of the Virginia Senate for Accomac and Northampton Counties
- In office December 7, 1801 – December 3, 1809
- Preceded by: John Eyre
- Succeeded by: Littleton Upshur

Member of the Virginia House of Delegates for Accomac County
- In office December 4, 1797 – December 6, 1801 Serving with John Wise
- Preceded by: John Wharton
- Succeeded by: John A. Parker

Personal details
- Born: March 26, 1775 Hills Farm, Drummondtown, Accomac County, Virginia, U.S.
- Died: January 7, 1834 (aged 58) Mount Custis plantation, Accomac County, Virginia
- Party: Democratic-Republican
- Education: Washington Academy; Princeton College
- Profession: Politician, lawyer, planter

Thomas Monteagle Bayly (March 26, 1775 – January 7, 1834) was an eighteenth and nineteenth century politician, lawyer and planter from Virginia's Eastern Shore who represented Virginia's 13th congressional district (1813-1815) as well as served in both houses of the Virginia General Assembly. One of his sons, Thomas Henry Bayly, later also served as a congressman (1844-1856). Complicating matters (in addition to variant spellings of the familial surname common at the time), another lawyer of similar name Thomas Bayly (1775-1829) from Wicomico County on Maryland's Eastern Shore represented Maryland's 8th congressional district (1817-1823).

== Early life ==
Born on Hills Farm near Drummondtown, Virginia to the former Anne Drummond and her husband Thomas Bayly, Bayly was the youngest of three sons, and also had two younger sisters. He was descended from the First Families of Virginia. An ancestor, Richard Bayley, was one of the early settlers of Accomack County, establishing a plantation called "Craddock" early in the 17th century. This Thomas Bayly received a private education appropriate to his class, then attended Washington Academy in Maryland. He went on to graduate from Princeton College in New Jersey in 1794, then studied law.

== Career ==
Admitted to the Virginia bar around 1796, Bayly began practicing law in Accomack County. Like his father and many other ancestors, Bayly also operated plantations using enslaved labor, making his Mount Custis plantation his residence. In the 1820 federal census, Bayly's 37 person household in Accomack County included 2 free blacks and 26 enslaved. By the time Bayly died, his extensive landholdings included property in Maryland as well as in Ohio and Illinois.

Accomack County voters first elected Bayly as one of their (part-time) representatives in the Virginia House of Delegates in 1798; he succeeded John Wharton and served alongside his cousin, John Wise, and voters re-elected the pair annually until 1801. In 1801, Bayly won election to the Virginia State Senate, representing Virginia's Eastern Shore, and was re-elected until 1809.

A vocal opponent of the War of 1812, Bayly successfully ran as a Federalist in 1812. Because of his popularity on the Eastern Shore, and possibly because British warships in Chesapeake Bay limited turnout in the western part of the district which favored the incumbent, he narrowly defeated Congressman Burwell Bassett to win election to the United States House of Representatives. Despite accusations that polling places had remained open too long in Accomack County, the House of Representatives seated Bayly, who served from 1813 to 1815. Bayly took the field in 1814 as lieutenant colonel of Virginia's 2nd Regiment of militia. Bayly did not seek reelection in 1814, and instead returned to his legal practice and operating his plantations.

In 1819 Accomac voters returned Bayly to the Virginia House of Delegates, replacing both incumbents with Bayly and John P. Drummond, although in the next election only Drummond won re-election. Bayly again won election in 1828, again serving alongside John P. Drummond, and twice re-elected the pair.

Before his last term in the House of Delegates, Bayly also served as one of the four delegates to the Virginia Constitutional Convention of 1829-1830 from the Tidewater district including Mathews, Gloucester, Middlesex, Northampton and Accomack counties, together with Thomas R. Joynes, Abel P. Upshur and Calvin H. Read (who died and was replaced by William K. Perrin). During the convention, Bayly endorsed some of the reforms advocated by the western counties, including extension of suffrage to more white men and reapportionment, but adopted generally conservative positions and voted against other reforms.

== Personal life ==
He married Margaret Pettit Cropper on February 24, 1802, and they had four daughters and five sons who reached adulthood. The fourth son, Thomas Henry Bayly, continued his father's political and planter traditions, serving a dozen years as a Congressman (1844-1856). After Margaret died in December 1823, Bayly remarried, to Jane Addison (d. 1888), on December 21, 1826. The couple had two daughters and a son (Samuel Thomas Bayly) before this man's death.

== Death ==
Bayly wrote his will in 1828, which indicated that his debts required setting aside profits from some of his land for five years, as well as the sale of other properties. He died at his "Mount Custis" plantation in Accomac, Virginia on January 7, 1834, and was interred in the family cemetery at Hills farm estate. His widow survived him by five decades, and is buried at historic Hollywood Cemetery in Richmond, as is their son, C.S.A. Col. Samuel Thomas Bayley (1830-1872), who became a lawyer like his father, but in Richmond, Virginia. He fought for the Confederacy, first as Captain of the 1st Regiment of Virginia Volunteers (1859-60), then as Captain of Company A of the 20th Virginia Infantry, then on the staff of C.S.A. Brig. Gen. J.H. Winder and finally was assigned to the prison district headquarters for Virginia and the Carolinas.

U.S. House of Representatives
| Preceded by William A. Burwell | Member of the U.S. House of Representatives from Virginia's 13th congressional district March 4, 1813 – March 3, 1815 (obsolete district) | Succeeded by Burwell Bassett |
