= Severn E. Parker =

American politician

Severn Eyre Parker

Member of the U.S. House of Representatives from Virginia
- In office March 4, 1819 – March 3, 1821
- Preceded by: Burwell Bassett
- Succeeded by: Burwell Bassett
- Constituency: 13th district

Member of the Virginia House of Delegates for Accomac County
- In office 1834–1836
- In office 1828–1829

Member of the Virginia Senate for Accomac and Northampton Counties
- In office 1817–1820
- Preceded by: John Cropper

Member of the Virginia House of Delegates for Accomac County
- In office 1810–1812 Serving with William Scarborough, John Finnie, Thomas R. Joynes
- Preceded by: John G. Joynes
- Succeeded by: William P. Custis

Personal details
- Born: July 19, 1787 Poplar Grove plantation, Accomac County, Virginia
- Died: October 21, 1836 (aged 49) Poplar Grove plantation, Accomac County, Virginia
- Party: Democratic-Republican
- Education: College of William & Mary
- Profession: Politician, lawyer, planter

Severn Eyre Parker (July 19, 1787 – October 21, 1836) was a nineteenth-century planter, politician and lawyer from Virginia's Eastern Shore who served in both houses of the Virginia General Assembly, and one term in the U.S. House of Representatives representing Virginia's 13th congressional district.

== Early life and education ==
Born near Eastville, Virginia to planter and lawyer George Parker and his first wife, Margaret Eyre, the daughter of the late burgess Severn Eyre, Parker could trace his maternal ancestors to a settler at Jamestown in 1622, and his earlier paternal ancestor had emigrated in 1650. He attended the common schools as a child, then the College of William & Mary in Williamsburg, as well as studied law.

== Career ==
Parker was admitted to the Virginia bar. He also operated plantations using enslaved labor, as had both his maternal and paternal ancestors.

Accomac County voters elected him as one of their representatives in the Virginia House of Delegates after veteran John G. Joynes resigned that part-time position to serve in the more lucrative position of county sheriff (Virginia law at the time prohibited holding both positions), and won re-election serving from 1810 until 1812.

On March 8, 1813, Parker accepted appointment as deputy clerk of Northampton County, Virginia. He also served as captain of a rifle company in 1814.

Parker served in the Virginia State Senate from 1817 to 1820 and was elected a Democratic-Republican to the United States House of Representatives in 1818, serving from 1819 to 1821. He returned to the House of Delegates in 1828, 1829 and from 1834 to 1836.

== Death and legacy ==
Parker died on October 21, 1836, in Northampton County, Virginia, and was interred in a private cemetery on Kendall Grove Farm near Eastville, Virginia.

U.S. House of Representatives
Preceded by Burwell Bassett	Member of the U.S. House of Representatives from Virginia's 13th congressional district March 4, 1819 – March 3, 1821 (obsolete district)	Succeeded by Burwell Bassett
