= Walter Jones (Virginia politician) =

American politician

Member of the U.S. House of Representatives from Virginia's 8th district
- In office March 4, 1803 – March 3, 1811
- Preceded by: Thomas Claiborne
- Succeeded by: John Hungerford

Member of the Virginia Senate from Lancaster, Richmond and Northumberland Counties
- In office 1802–1803
- Preceded by: John Tayloe
- Succeeded by: Richard Barnes
- In office 1785–1786
- Preceded by: William Peachey
- Succeeded by: John Gordon

Member of the U.S. House of Representatives from Virginia's 19th district
- In office March 4, 1797 – March 3, 1799
- Preceded by: John Heath
- Succeeded by: Henry Lee

Personal details
- Born: December 18, 1745 Williamsburg, Virginia Colony, British America
- Died: December 31, 1815 (aged 70) Westmoreland County, Virginia, U.S.
- Party: Democratic-Republican
- Education: College of William and Mary (1760)
- Profession: Physician

Walter Jones (December 18, 1745 – December 31, 1815) was an 18th- and 19th-century politician and physician from the Tidewater region of Virginia.

== Early life and education ==
Born in Williamsburg in the Colony of Virginia, Jones graduated from the College of William and Mary in 1760. He studied medicine in Edinburgh, Scotland and received a degree of Doctor of Medicine in 1770.

== Career ==
He returned to Northumberland County, Virginia and became physician general of the Middle Military Department in 1777. Jones was a member of the Virginia Senate from 1785 to 1787. He was also a delegate to the Virginia Ratifying Convention in 1788; an event held at the Richmond Theatre. He was elected a Democratic-Republican to the United States House of Representatives in 1796, serving from 1797 to 1799. He returned to the state Senate in 1802 and 1803 and was elected back to the House of Representatives again in 1802, serving from 1803 to 1811.

== Personal life ==
His son and namesake, Walter Jones (1775–1861) practiced law in Washington most of his life and reportedly argued more cases before the U.S. Supreme Court – over 300, including McCulloch vs. Maryland - than any other attorney in American history. A close friend of James Madison, James Marshall and John Calhoun, that Walter Jones Jr. also held the rank of Major General of the Army, and rode at the head of the District of Columbia Militia at presidential inaugurations. The younger Jones was also a member of the Columbian Institute for the Promotion of Arts and Sciences, a prestigious society which counted among its members former presidents Andrew Jackson and John Quincy Adams and many other prominent men of the day, including well-known representatives of the military, government service, medical and other professions. Living until the start of the Civil War, he strongly opposed Virginia's secession.

== Death and legacy ==
The elder Jones died in Westmoreland County, Virginia, on December 31, 1815, and was interred there in the family cemetery at "Hayfield" near what is now Callao, Virginia.

U.S. House of Representatives
Preceded by John Heath	Member of the U.S. House of Representatives from Virginia's 19th congressional district March 4, 1797 – March 3, 1799 (obsolete district)	Succeeded by Henry Lee
Preceded by Thomas Claiborne	Member of the U.S. House of Representatives from Virginia's 8th congressional district March 4, 1803 – March 3, 1811	Succeeded by John Hungerford
