= Richard Kidder Meade =

American politician

Richard K. Meade

10th United States Minister to Brazil
- In office December 5, 1857 – July 9, 1861
- President: James Buchanan; Abraham Lincoln
- Preceded by: William Trousdale
- Succeeded by: James Watson Webb

Member of the U.S. House of Representatives from Virginia's 2nd district
- In office August 5, 1847 – March 3, 1853
- Preceded by: George Dromgoole
- Succeeded by: John Millson

Member of the Virginia Senate from Brunswick, Dinwiddie and Greensville Counties
- In office 1835 – 1838
- Preceded by: George Dromgoole
- Succeeded by: Edward P. Scott

Personal details
- Born: Richard Kidder Meade, Jr. July 29, 1803 Lawrenceville, Virginia, US
- Died: April 20, 1862 (aged 58) Petersburg, Virginia, US
- Party: Democratic
- Occupation: lawyer, politician, diplomat

Richard Kidder Meade, Jr. (July 29, 1803 – April 20, 1862) was Virginia lawyer, plantation owner and politician who served in the Virginia Senate and in the United States House of Representatives, as well as U.S. minister to Brazil under President James Buchanan before returning to Virginia to work for the Confederate States of America during the American Civil War until his death.

== Early and family life ==
Meade was born in what was then Frederick County in the state's northwestern corner, the son of Mary Fitzhugh Grymes Randolph and her husband Richard Kidder Meade. Both his grandfathers as well as great grandfathers were from far to the southeast, and Meade would represent Southside Virginia in the Virginia senate. His ancestor Andrew Meade had emigrated from Ireland possibly with his son David Meade (circa 1710-1757), who settled in Nansemond County and whose sons became prominent patriots. His grandfather David Meade (Jr.) (1744 - after 1796) served in the House of Burgesses after troubleshooting problems in his local parish, then assisted the patriot cause by providing provisions while his brothers fought as officers and served as aides to General Washington.

David Meade owned slaves in Nansemond County, in 1787 (and possibly others in Elizabeth City County), and ultimately moved to Jessamine County, Kentucky (where he died). Like his younger brother Everard Meade, who settled in Amelia County after his Revolutionary service, Meade's father was educated at Harrow in England. His paternal grandmother Susana Everard was the daughter of North Carolina's governor Sir Richard Everard, 4th Baronet. His brother William Meade remained in Frederick County and became the Episcopal Bishop of Virginia. Both boys had private tutors, as befit their class. Meade also studied law.

== Personal life ==
Meade married Julia Edmunds Haskins in Petersburg, Virginia on November 3, 1825. Their children included sons Richard Kidder Meade [III] (1835–1862), Hugh Everard Meade (1838–1862) and David (1845–1929), as well as daughters Susan Meade Bolling (-1861), Indiana (1826-1898), Julia (b. 1831), Mary (b. 1839) and Marion (b. 1842).

== Career ==
He was admitted to the bar and commenced practice in Petersburg, Virginia. He also became a plantation owner in St. Andrews Parish, Brunswick County, Virginia near Lawrenceville. In the 1820 U.S. Census, this Richard Kidder Meade owned 55 enslaved persons, and his household also included 16 free white persons. In the 1830 U.S. Federal Census, he owned 43 enslaved persons and his household included three other white persons. The 1840 U.S. Census for Dinwiddie County, Virginia shows his household as including 10 white persons and 15 enslaved persons. The earlier censuses do not list the names of family members. The 1860 U.S. Federal Census lists him as living in Petersburg's south ward with many family members. His personal estate at the time is $7000 along with $20,000 in real estate. By 1836, Meade invested in the Brunswick Land Company, which invested and speculated in Texas.

In 1836, he was elected to the State Senate, where he represented Brunswick, Dinwiddie and Greensville Counties from 1835–1838. He replaced George C. Dromgoole, who had won election to the U.S. Congress.

=== Congress ===
When Congressman Dromgoole died, Meade was elected as a Democrat to the Thirtieth Congress to fill the vacancy. Voters of Virginia's 2nd congressional district reelected him to the Thirty-first and Thirty-second Congresses. He served from August 5, 1847, to March 3, 1853. His seat was taken by John Singleton Millson.

Meade declined President Pierce's offer as charge d'affairs to Sardinia in 1853.

=== Later career ===
He became a strong supporter of President James Buchanan, who rewarded him by appointing him Minister to Brazil. After confirmation by the U.S. Senate, served from July 27, 1857, to July 9, 1861. He was replaced by James Watson Webb.

Upon the election of President Abraham Lincoln, Meade returned to Virginia and devoted himself to the cause of the Confederacy. His older sons also volunteered as Confederates.

== Death ==
Richard Kidder Meade died in Petersburg, Virginia, on April 20, 1862.

== Electoral history ==
- 1847; Meade was elected to the U.S. House of Representatives with 53.91% of the vote, defeating Whig George W. Bolling.
- 1849; Meade was re-elected with 88.67% of the vote, defeating Whig S.J. Weisigner and Independent identified only as Shell.
- 1851; Meade was re-elected unopposed.

== Sources ==
- United States Congress. "Richard Kidder Meade (id: M000618)". Biographical Directory of the United States Congress.

Political offices
Preceded by William Trousdale	United States Minister to Brazil; 1857–1861	Succeeded by James Watson Webb
U.S. House of Representatives
Preceded by George Dromgoole	Member of the U.S. House of Representatives from Virginia's 2nd congressional district 1847–1853	Succeeded by John Millson
