= Thomas H. Bayly =

American politician

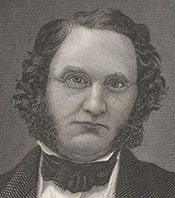

Member of the U.S. House of Representatives from Virginia
- In office May 6, 1844 – June 23, 1856
- Preceded by: Henry A. Wise (7th); John Millson (1st)
- Succeeded by: William Smith (7th); Muscoe R. H. Garnett (1st)
- Constituency: 7th district (1844-53); 1st district (1853-56)

Chairman of the Committee on Foreign Affairs
- In office March 4, 1851 – March 3, 1855
- Preceded by: John Alexander McClernand
- Succeeded by: Alexander C. M. Pennington

Chairman of the Committee on Ways and Means
- In office March 4, 1849 – March 3, 1851
- Preceded by: Samuel Vinton
- Succeeded by: George S. Houston

Member of the Virginia House of Delegates from Accomack County
- In office 1836–1841; Alongside Robert Poulson, Thomas Cropper and John Ailworth

Personal details
- Born: Thomas Henry Bayly; December 11, 1810 Drummondtown, Virginia
- Died: June 23, 1856 (aged 45) Drummondtown, Virginia
- Resting place: Accomac, Virginia
- Party: Democratic
- Spouse: Evelyn Harrison
- Education: University of Virginia School of Law
- Occupation: Attorney

Military service
- Branch/service: Virginia Militia
- Years of service: 1837–1846
- Rank: Brigadier General
- Unit: 21st Brigade

Thomas Henry Bayly (December 11, 1810 – June 23, 1856) was a United States nineteenth-century Democratic politician, planter, militia officer, lawyer and judge from Virginia's Eastern Shore, and the son of Federalist Congressman Thomas M. Bayly.

== Early life and education ==
Born at "Mount Custis" plantation near Drummondtown (the Accomack County seat now known as Accomac, Virginia), to the former Margaret Pettit Cropper and her husband, then Virginia state senator and militia officer Thomas Monteagle Bayly. He was the fourth of the couple's nine children, and had three elder brothers as well as a younger brother and four full sisters. His mother died when he was barely a teenager, and his father remarried (which marriage produced another son and two daughters). Bayly's ancestor, also Thomas Bayly, had emigrated to the Virginia colony more than a century earlier with two brothers, and each generation of the family had at least one boy with the name Thomas, although spelling of the family surname varied, especially during the colonial era (alternates included "Bailey" and "Bayley").

The senior Bayly served a term in the U.S. House of Representatives from 1813 to 1815, during the War of 1812, when this boy was an infant. His father primarily operated plantations using enslaved labor, and would also later again serve (part-time) in the Virginia House of Delegates, and represented Accomack County at the Virginia Constitutional Convention of 1829. Young Bayly received a private education suitable to his class, and traveled to Charlottesville to study law at the University of Virginia School of Law in 1828, graduating in 1829.

== Career ==
=== Lawyer and planter ===
Admitted to the bar on October 12, 1831, Bayly practiced law in Accomac County and nearby areas. He also operated the family plantation using enslaved labor, especially after his father's death in 1834. In 1840, he owned 29 slaves. In 1850 Bayly owned 31 slaves (ten 10 years old or younger) as well as land worth $70,000.

=== Politician and military officer ===
Accomack County voters elected and re-elected Bayly as one of their two representatives in the Virginia House of Delegates, where he served (part time) from 1836 to 1842. In 1837 he accepted appointment as brigadier general of the 21st Brigade in the Virginia Militia, and served until 1846. Fellow legislators elected Bayly judge of the Circuit Court of Law and Chancery for Accomack County in 1842, and he resigned both his legislative and military positions to avoid a conflict of interest. Bayly remained a judge for about two years, resigning after winning election to Congress, but that term led to his normal distinguishing title.

In 1844, Bayly ran as a state's rights Democrat (although his father had been a Federalist) to fill a vacancy in the United States House of Representatives caused by the resignation of his cousin, Henry A. Wise, who became U.S. Minister to Brazil during the presidency of John Tyler. Bayly won election and was re-elected until his death in 1856. He rose to become chairman of the House Committee on Ways and Means from 1849 to 1851 and chairman of the Committee on Foreign Affairs from 1851 to 1855. During that time the district name changed from Virginia's 7th congressional district to Virginia's 1st congressional district following redistricting following the 1850 census and adoption of a new Virginia constitution).

Early in his Congressional career, Bayly gained a reputation for being outspoken and combative, and came within minutes of fighting a duel with Kentucky Congressman Garrett Davis after a spirited debate. In 1847, he shot and wounded a neighbor in Drummondtown during a fight over division within the Methodist church. Bayly later became known for his attempts to unite southern and northern Democrats during the debates concerning slavery, so many Southern fire-eaters despised him. In the Democratic National Convention of 1848, Bayly led the Virginia delegation, which supported Michigan U.S. Senator Lewis Cass for President. Bayly also used tact and other political skills to support the Compromise of 1850.

== Personal life ==
On May 11, 1837, Bayly married Evelyn Harrison may of Petersburg, who bore two daughters who reached adulthood.

== Death and legacy ==
Bayly died of consumption at the age of 45 on June 23, 1856, during his congressional term, but at his estate, Mount Custis, near Drummondtown, Virginia. He was interred in the family cemetery there, as soon would be his eldest daughter, and decades later, his widow. Bayly also has a cenotaph at Congressional Cemetery in Washington, D.C..

The University of Virginia Art Museum is housed in the Thomas H. Bayly Building.

== Elections ==
- 1844; Bayly was first elected to the U.S. House of Representatives with 54.5% of the vote, defeating Whig Hitt Carter.
- 1845; Bayly was re-elected with 53.54% of the vote, defeating Whig George W. Southall.
- 1847; Bayly was re-elected with 52.47% of the vote, defeating Whig John J. Jones.
- 1849; Bayly was re-elected with 64.75% of the vote, defeating Whig Francis Mallory.
- 1851; Bayly was re-elected unopposed.
- 1853; Bayly was re-elected with 58.93% of the vote, defeating Independents Louis C.H. Finney and George W. Lewis.
- 1855; Bayly was re-elected with 79.09% of the vote, defeating Independents Robert L. Montague, Richard Lee Turberville Beale, Joseph Eggleston Segar, and a man identified only as Jennings.

== See also ==
- List of members of the United States Congress who died in office (1790–1899)

U.S. House of Representatives
Preceded by Henry A. Wise	Member of the U.S. House of Representatives from Virginia's 7th congressional district 1844–1853	Succeeded by William Smith
Preceded by John S. Millson	Member of the U.S. House of Representatives from Virginia's 1st congressional district 1853–1856	Succeeded by Muscoe Russell Hunter Garnett
Political offices
Preceded by John Alexander McClernand; Illinois	Chairman of House Foreign Affairs Committee; 1851–1855	Succeeded by Alexander C. M. Pennington; New Jersey
Preceded by Samuel Vinton; Ohio	Chairman of House Ways and Means Committee; 1849–1851	Succeeded by George S. Houston; Alabama
