= John Hungerford (Virginia politician) =

American politician (1761–1833)

John P. Hungerford

Member of the U.S. House of Representatives from Virginia's 8th district
- In office March 4, 1811 – November 29, 1811
- Preceded by: Walter Jones
- Succeeded by: John Taliaferro
- In office March 4, 1813 – March 4, 1817
- Preceded by: John Taliaferro
- Succeeded by: William L. Ball

Personal details
- Born: January 2, 1761 Leedstown, Virginia
- Died: December 21, 1833 (aged 72) Westmoreland County, Virginia
- Resting place: Hungerford Cemetery, Leedstown, Virginia
- Party: Democratic-Republican

John Pratt Hungerford (January 2, 1761 – December 21, 1833) was an 18th- and 19th-century politician and lawyer from Virginia. He served two terms in the U.S. House of Representatives from 1813 to 1817. Previously, he had served in the House in 1811, but was removed from office after his election results were called into question by a House investigation.

== Biography ==
Born in Leeds, Virginia, Hungerford received an elementary education under private teachers as a child. He studied law and was admitted to the bar.

=== War service and state legislative career ===
He served in the Revolutionary War and later became a member of the Virginia House of Delegates, serving from 1797 to 1801 and from there to the Virginia State Senate, serving from 1801 to 1809.

Hungerford served in the War of 1812 as a brigadier general of militia and later returned to the House of Delegates, serving again from 1823 to 1830.

=== Contested elections to Congress ===
His first two elections to the United States Congress required lengthy investigations and official rulings as to the legitimacy of the elections. In 1811, he was seated as a Democratic-Republican member in the United States House of Representatives, having won his election by only 6 votes. The election was contested by his opponent, John Taliaferro, and the House initiated a review. After the initial House committee ruled in Hungerford’s favor, the House itself decided that many ineligible voters had voted, which resulted in Hungerford’s removal from office. The resulting vote tally from the election gave Taliaferro a majority of 121 votes. In the next congressional election in 1812, Hungerford was again elected to the House, and his opponent again filed a protest, this time based upon a technicality involving the manner in which names were recorded on the voter rolls. This time, the investigative committee ruled against Hungerford, but the entire House once again overruled the committee, declaring Hungerford the winner.

He then served two terms from 1813 to 1817.

=== Death ===
He died at "Twiford" in Westmoreland County, Virginia on December 21, 1833, and was interred in Hungerford Cemetery in Leedstown, Virginia.

U.S. House of Representatives
Preceded by Walter Jones	Member of the U.S. House of Representatives from Virginia's 8th congressional district March 4, 1811 – November 29, 1811	Succeeded by John Taliaferro
Preceded by Aylett Hawes	Member of the U.S. House of Representatives from Virginia's 9th congressional district March 4, 1813 – March 4, 1817	Succeeded by William L. Ball
