= Burwell Bassett =

American politician (1764–1841)

Burwell Bassett Jr.

Member of the U.S. House of Representatives from Virginia
- In office March 4, 1805 – March 3, 1813
- Preceded by: Thomas Griffin
- Succeeded by: John Roane
- Constituency: 12th district
- In office March 4, 1815 – March 3, 1819
- Preceded by: Thomas M. Bayly
- Succeeded by: Severn E. Parker
- Constituency: 13th district
- In office March 4, 1821 – March 3, 1829
- Preceded by: Severn E. Parker (13th); Charles F. Mercer (8th)
- Succeeded by: William L. Ball (13th); Richard Coke Jr. (8th)
- Constituency: 13th district (1821-23); 8th district (1823-29)

Member of the Virginia House of Delegates for James City County
- In office December 6, 1819 – March 3, 1821 Serving with Bennett Kirby
- Preceded by: Lewis C. Tyler
- Succeeded by: John M. Gregory

Member of the Virginia Senate for Charles City, James City County and New Kent Counties
- In office October 21, 1793 – March 3, 1805
- Preceded by: Burwell Bassett Sr.
- Succeeded by: William Chamberlayne

Member of the Virginia House of Delegates for New Kent County
- In office October 15, 1787 – October 17, 1790 Serving with William H. Macon, John Dandridge, John Clopton
- Preceded by: William Dandridge
- Succeeded by: John Hockaday

Personal details
- Born: March 18, 1764 Eltham plantation, New Kent County, Province of Virginia
- Died: February 26, 1841 (aged 76) New Kent County, Virginia, US
- Citizenship: Kingdom of Great Britain; United States of America
- Spouse(s): Elizabeth McCarty, Philadelphia Ann Claiborne
- Occupation: Planter, militia officer, politician

Burwell Bassett, Jr. (March 18, 1764 – February 26, 1841) was an American planter and politician from New Kent County and for two decades from Williamsburg in the Commonwealth of Virginia. Like his father, he served in both chambers of the Virginia General Assembly, and in addition won election (and lost re-election) several times to the United States House of Representatives, where he served for more than a decade in three different districts, because of census-required reorganizations.

== Early and family life ==
Born in at the family plantation, known as Eltham, in New Kent County, to the former Anna Marie Dandridge and her husband Burwell Bassett Sr. He was their second of four sons, and fifth of the couple's eight children, and received a private education appropriate to his class, then attended the College of William and Mary in Williamsburg. Although he was his father's principal heir and married twice, he had no children. Both sides of his family were among the First Families of Virginia. His father, Burwell Bassett Sr. and maternal grandfather Bartholomew Dandridge were patriots and served many terms in the Virginia General Assembly, with father also serving in the Virginia Ratification Convention for the U.S. Constitution and Bartholomew Dandridge also serving on what is now known as the Virginia Supreme Court. Furthermore, his aunt Martha Dandridge Custis Washington was married to General (later President) George Washington. He was also the first cousin of President William Henry Harrison.

Bassett married twice. On January 10, 1788, he married Elizabeth McCarty, the daughter of planter and delegate Col. Daniel McCarty of Westmoreland County. After her death, Bassett remarried in 1800, to Philadelphia Ann Claiborne.

== Career ==
The Bassetts had long been among the ruling elite in New Kent County and neighboring Hanover County (which split from New Kent County in his father's lifetime). When his father died, Bassett inherited about 6,000 acres of land in New Kent County and more than 1000 acres in Hanover County. Following his father's death he also purchased about 350 acres in neighboring James City County. Bassett operated these plantations using enslaved labor, mostly using overseers, especially after he moved to Williamsburg, where Basset lived from 1815 until 1837. In the 1810 census, he owned 98 enslaved people in New Kent County. A decade later, his two New Kent slave plantations under separate overseers included 88 enslaved men and women, and he owned another 19 in James City County. In the 1830 federal census, Bassett owned 109 enslaved men and women in New Kent County, and 18 in James City County. Bassett sold his James City County land in 1837, and may also have sold enslaved people from his New Kent County plantations, or given them to relatives. In 1840, the last census in his lifetime, he appears to have owned 75 enslaved people in New Kent County.

Although Bassett held an officer's commission in the county militia, his only combat experience occurred during the War of 1812, principally in 1814 as the British invaded Chesapeake Bay. He was then Lieutenant Colonel of the 68th Regiment of the Virginia Militia.

Basset began his political career by running to become one of New Kent County's two part-time representatives in the Virginia House of Delegates, while at the same time his father represented New Kent and adjacent James City and Charles City Counties in the Virginia Senate. Voters elected (and re-elected) Bassett as one of New Kent County's delegates from 1787 to 1789. After his father's death in January 1793, Bassett won election and re-election to that seat in the Virginia Senate; thus he served in that part-time position from October 1793 to 1805.

Although Bassett lost his first three contests to become a member of the United States House of Representatives (to incumbent John Clopton in 1794 and 1796, and to Thomas Griffin in 1802), he was elected as a Democratic-Republican in 1804, and re-elected several times, serving from 1805 to 1813. During these terms, Bassett served as chairman of the Committee on Claims in the 12th Congress and of the Committee on Revisal and Unfinished Business from 1811 to 1813. In 1812, following census reapportionment, the district number changed to Virginia's 13th congressional district and Bassett failed to win re-election by approximately 50 votes, so anti-war Federalist Thomas Monteagle Bayly of Virginia's Eastern Shore represented the district for one term. However, Bassett was elected again in 1814, and re-elected, and so served from 1815 to 1819.

Despite announcing his retirement from Congress, Bassett won election to the House of Delegates from James City County, and won re-election for a second single-year term, serving from 1819 until taking his federal seat again in 1821. Voters returned Bassett to the United States House a third time beginning in 1820, and re-elected him several times. He again announced his retirement early in 1828, then was convinced to run again, but lost to Richard Coke Jr. of Gloucester County, who in the interim had received pledges of support from other politicians in that district. In his final legislative terms, from 1821 to 1829, Basset aligned with the Democratic-Republican Party, then the Crawford Republicans and finally with the Jacksonian Democrats. He lost his bid for reelection in 1828, although he would live for more than another decade. His political career ended after he ran last in a field of eight candidates for the Virginia Constitutional Convention of 1829-1830. During his final congressional terms, Basset spoke only occasionally, criticizing President John Quincy Adams and attempted to reduce the U.S. Navy.

Bassett also promoted public schooling and was active in the Episcopal Church. British educational reformer Joseph Lancaster stayed with Bassett while touring Virginia in 1819. While living in Williamsburg, Bassett served on the vestry of historic Bruton Parish Church. In 1811 he sponsored a bill in the House of Representatives to incorporate Alexandria's Episcopal Church, but President James Madison vetoed the proposed legislation, saying it violated the First Amendment. Bassett also served as a delegate to several Virginia episcopal church conventions and in 1827 became a trustee of the Virginia Theological Seminary in Alexandria.

== Death and legacy ==
In 1837, Bassett sold his James City County land and returned to live his final years in New Kent County. He died on February 26, 1841, in New Kent County, Virginia. He was probably interred at his Eltham Plantation, in Eltham, Virginia; the plantation house burned to the ground in 1875. A grand-niece later wrote that Bassett had been "perhaps the last man in Virginia who wore small clothes and powdered hair in a queue.

U.S. House of Representatives
Preceded by Thomas Griffin	Member of the U.S. House of Representatives from Virginia's 12th congressional district March 4, 1805 – March 3, 1813	Succeeded by John Roane
Preceded by Thomas M. Bayly	Member of the U.S. House of Representatives from Virginia's 13th congressional district March 4, 1815 – March 3, 1819	Succeeded by Severn E. Parker
Preceded by Severn E. Parker	Member of the U.S. House of Representatives from Virginia's 13th congressional district March 4, 1821 – March 3, 1823	Succeeded by William L. Ball
Preceded by Charles F. Mercer	Member of the U.S. House of Representatives from Virginia's 8th congressional district March 4, 1823 – March 3, 1829	Succeeded by Richard Coke, Jr.
