= William Lee Ball =

American politician

William L. Ball

Member of the U.S. House of Representatives from Virginia
- In office March 4, 1817 – February 29, 1824
- Preceded by: John Hungerford (9th); Burwell Bassett (13th)
- Succeeded by: Andrew Stevenson (9th); John Taliaferro (13th)
- Constituency: 9th district (1817-23); 13th district (1823-24)

Personal details
- Born: William Lee Ball; January 2, 1781 Lancaster County, Virginia, U.S.
- Died: February 29, 1824 (aged 43) Washington, D.C.
- Resting place: Congressional Cemetery

William Lee Ball (January 2, 1781 – February 29, 1824) was a nineteenth-century politician from Virginia who served four terms in the U.S. House of Representatives from 1817 to until his death in 1824.

== Biography ==
Born in Lancaster County, Virginia, Ball received a liberal schooling as a child. He was a slave owner.

=== Political career ===
He was a member of the Virginia House of Delegates from 1805 to 1806 and again from 1810 to 1814. He served as a paymaster in the War of 1812 and was assigned to the 92nd Virginia Regiment.

He later went on to serve in the Virginia State Senate from 1814 to 1817. He was elected a Democratic-Republican and later a Crawford Republican to the United States House of Representatives in 1816. He was reelected three times before dying in office in 1824.

=== Death and burial ===
He served in the House from 1817 until his death in Washington, D.C., on February 29, 1824.

He was interred in Congressional Cemetery.

== See also ==
- List of members of the United States Congress who died in office (1790–1899)

U.S. House of Representatives
Preceded by John Hungerford	Member of the U.S. House of Representatives from Virginia's 9th congressional district March 4, 1817 – March 4, 1823	Succeeded by Andrew Stevenson
Preceded by Burwell Bassett	Member of the U.S. House of Representatives from Virginia's 13th congressional district March 4, 1823 – February 29, 1824 (obsolete district)	Succeeded by John Taliaferro
