= John Taliaferro =

American politician (1768–1852)

Personal details
- Born: 1768 Fredericksburg, Province of Virginia, British America
- Died: August 12, 1852 (aged 83–84) near Fredericksburg, Virginia, U.S.
- Party: Democratic-Republican; National Republican; Whig
- Occupation: Politician; lawyer; librarian

John Taliaferro (1768 – August 12, 1852) was a 19th century politician, lawyer and librarian from Virginia, serving several non-consecutive terms in the U.S. House of Representatives in the early 19th century.

== Early life and education ==
John Taliaferro was born in 1768 on "Hays" near Fredericksburg, Virginia, to Elizabeth (née Garnett) and John Taliaferro. He attended a private school. He studied law and was admitted to the bar, commencing practice in Fredericksburg.

== Career ==
Taliaferro was elected a Democratic-Republican to the United States House of Representatives in 1800, serving from March 4, 1801, to March 3, 1803. In 1805, he was a presidential elector for the Jefferson ticket. In 1811 he was elected again and served from December 2, 1811, to March 3, 1813. His seat was at first declared for his opponent, John Hungerford, but after a lengthy investigation and official rulings as to the legitimacy of the election, Taliaferro was eventually awarded the seat. The initial House committee ruled in Hungerford's favor, but upon review the House itself decided that many ineligible voters had voted, which resulted in Hungerford's removal from office, as the resulting vote tally from the election gave Taliferro a majority of 121 votes. In 1821, he was a presidential elector for the Monroe ticket.

In 1823 Taliaferro was elected to the House a third time, originally to fill a vacancy as a Crawford Republican, Adams Republican and Anti-Jacksonian. He served from April 8, 1824, to March 3, 1831.

Taliferro's name is listed as the author of an anti-Jackson handbill distributed during the campaign of 1828. The handbill is called "Supplemental account of some of the bloody deeds of General Jackson" and describes itself as a supplement to the Coffin Handbills. In it, Jackson is accused of "atrocious and unnatural acts," including eating mercilessly-slaughtered Indians for breakfast.

Taliferro served in the Virginia Constitutional Convention of 1829–1830. He was elected as one of four delegates from a state Senate district of his home county in the Northern Neck, King George County, including Westmoreland, Lancaster, Northumberland, Richmond, Stafford and Prince William Counties.

Elected a fourth time in 1834, he ran as an Anti-Jacksonian and Whig, serving from March 4, 1835, to March 3, 1843. He was chairman of the Committee on Revolutionary Pensions from 1839 to 1843.

Taliaferro worked as a librarian at the United States Department of the Treasury from 1850 to his death.

== Personal life ==
Taliaferro died at his farm "Hagley" near Fredericksburg on August 12, 1852. He was interred on the property.

== Bibliography ==
- Pulliam, David Loyd (1901). The Constitutional Conventions of Virginia from the foundation of the Commonwealth to the present time. John T. West, Richmond. OCLC 6407098.
- United States Congress. "John Taliaferro (id: T000027)". Biographical Directory of the United States Congress.

U.S. House of Representatives
Preceded by Henry Lee III	Member of the U.S. House of Representatives from Virginia's 19th congressional district March 4, 1801 – March 4, 1803 (obsolete district)	Succeeded by Edwin Gray
Preceded by John P. Hungerford	Member of the U.S. House of Representatives from Virginia's 8th congressional district November 29, 1811 – March 4, 1813	Succeeded by Joseph Lewis, Jr.
Preceded by William L. Ball	Member of the U.S. House of Representatives from Virginia's 13th congressional district March 24, 1824 – March 4, 1831 (obsolete district)	Succeeded by Joseph Chinn
Preceded by Joseph Chinn	Member of the U.S. House of Representatives from Virginia's 10th congressional district March 4, 1835 – March 4, 1843	Succeeded by William Lucas

- United States Congress. "John Taliaferro (id: T000027)". Biographical Directory of the United States Congress.
