= Virginia's 13th congressional district =

1793–1863 US congressional district

Coordinates: 37°0′N 81°50′W

- Obsolete district
- Created: 1793
- Eliminated: 1863
- Years active: 1793–1863

Virginia's 13th congressional district is an obsolete U.S. congressional district. Its last member of Congress was Elbert S. Martin.

== List of members representing the district ==
Member	Party	Term	Cong ress	Electoral history
District established March 4, 1793
Samuel Griffin (Williamsburg)	Pro-Administration	March 4, 1793 – March 3, 1795	3rd	Redistricted from the 10th district and re-elected in 1793. Retired.
John Clopton (New Kent County)	Democratic-Republican	March 4, 1795 – March 3, 1799	4th 5th	Elected in 1795. Re-elected in 1797. Lost re-election.
John Marshall (Delaplane)	Federalist	March 4, 1799 – June 7, 1800	6th	Elected in 1799. Resigned to become U.S. Secretary of State.
Vacant		June 8, 1800 – November 25, 1800	6th	
Littleton W. Tazewell (Norfolk)	Democratic-Republican	November 26, 1800 – March 3, 1801	6th	Elected to finish Marshall's term. Retired.
John Clopton (New Kent County)	Democratic-Republican	March 4, 1801 – March 3, 1803	7th	Elected in 1801. Redistricted to the 22nd district.
John J. Trigg (Liberty)	Democratic-Republican	March 4, 1803 – May 17, 1804	8th	Redistricted from the 5th district and re-elected in 1803. Died.
Vacant		May 18, 1804 – November 4, 1804	8th	
Christopher H. Clark (New London)	Democratic-Republican	November 5, 1804 – July 1, 1806	8th 9th	Elected in October 1804 to finish Trigg's term and seated November 5, 1804. Re-elected in 1805. Resigned.
Vacant		July 2, 1806 – November 30, 1806	9th	
William A. Burwell (Rocky Mount)	Democratic-Republican	December 1, 1806 – March 3, 1813	9th 10th 11th 12th	Elected in early November 1806 to finish Clark's term and seated December 1, 1806. Re-elected in 1807. Re-elected in 1809. Re-elected in 1811. Redistricted to the 14th district.
Thomas M. Bayly (Drummondtown)	Federalist	March 4, 1813 – March 3, 1815	13th	Elected in 1813. Retired.
Burwell Bassett (Williamsburg)	Democratic-Republican	March 4, 1815 – March 3, 1819	14th 15th	Elected in 1815. Re-elected in 1817. Lost re-election.
Severn E. Parker (Eastville)	Democratic-Republican	March 4, 1819 – March 3, 1821	16th	Elected in 1819. Lost re-election.
Burwell Bassett (Williamsburg)	Democratic-Republican	March 4, 1821 – March 3, 1823	17th	Elected in 1821. Redistricted to the 8th district.
William L. Ball (Nuttsville)	Democratic-Republican	March 4, 1823 – February 29, 1824	18th	Elected in 1823. Died.
Vacant		March 1, 1824 – March 23, 1824	18th	
John Taliaferro (Fredericksburg)	Democratic-Republican	March 24, 1824 – March 3, 1825	18th 19th 20th 21st	Elected to finish Ball's term. Re-elected in 1825. Re-elected in 1827. Re-elected in 1829. Lost re-election.
John Taliaferro (Fredericksburg)	Anti-Jacksonian	March 4, 1825 – March 3, 1831	18th 19th 20th 21st	Elected to finish Ball's term. Re-elected in 1825. Re-elected in 1827. Re-elected in 1829. Lost re-election.
Joseph W. Chinn (Nuttsville)	Jacksonian	March 4, 1831 – March 3, 1833	22nd	Elected in 1831. Redistricted to the 10th district.
John M. Patton (Fredericksburg)	Jacksonian	March 4, 1833 – March 3, 1837	23rd 24th 25th	Elected in 1833. Re-elected in 1835. Re-elected in 1837. Resigned.
John M. Patton (Fredericksburg)	Democratic	March 4, 1837 – April 7, 1838	23rd 24th 25th	Elected in 1833. Re-elected in 1835. Re-elected in 1837. Resigned.
Vacant		April 8, 1838 – April 27, 1838	25th	
Linn Banks (Madison)	Democratic	April 28, 1838 – December 6, 1841	25th 26th 27th	Elected to finish Patton's term. Re-elected in 1839. Election invalided.
William Smith (Culpeper)	Democratic	December 6, 1841 – March 3, 1843	27th	Elected in 1841. Lost re-election.
George W. Hopkins (Abingdon)	Democratic	March 4, 1843 – March 3, 1847	28th 29th	Elected in 1843. Re-elected in 1845. Appt. Chargé d'Affaires to Portugal.
Andrew S. Fulton (Wytheville)	Whig	March 4, 1847 – March 3, 1849	30th	Elected in 1847. Retired.
LaFayette McMullen (Rye Cove)	Democratic	March 4, 1849 – March 3, 1857	31st 32nd 33rd 34th	Elected in 1849. Re-elected in 1851. Re-elected in 1853. Re-elected in 1855. Appt. Governor of Washington Territory.
George W. Hopkins (Abingdon)	Democratic	March 4, 1857 – March 3, 1859	35th	Elected in 1857. Retired.
Elbert S. Martin (Lee County)	Independent Democratic	March 4, 1859 – March 3, 1861	36th	Elected in 1859. Lost re-election.
District inactive		March 4, 1861 – March 3, 1863	37th	Civil War
District dissolved March 4, 1863
