= Eltham, Virginia =

Unincorporated community in Virginia, US

Coordinates: 37°31′26″N 76°49′34″W

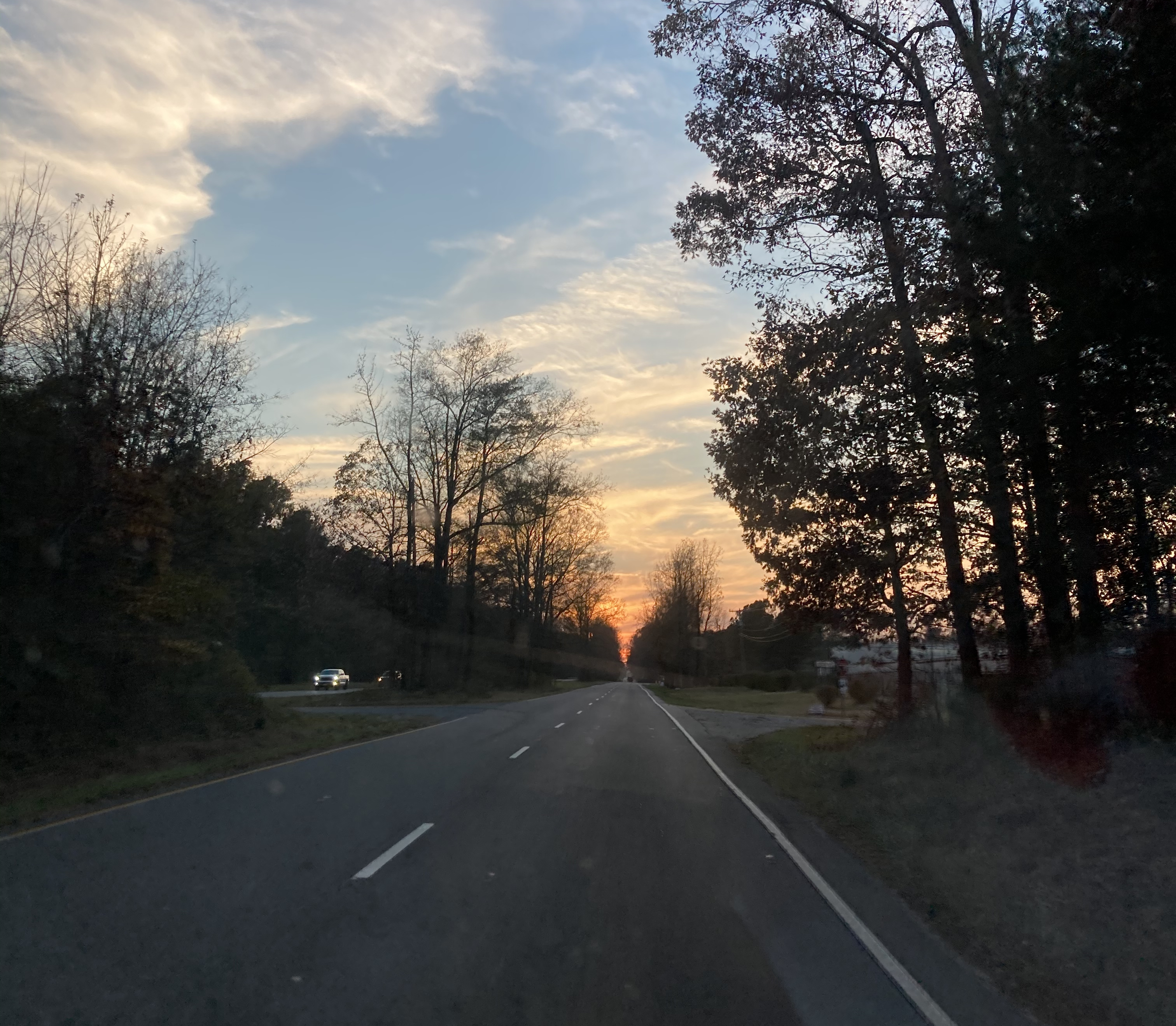
View of Eltham, Virginia outskirts.

Eltham is a small unincorporated community in New Kent County, Virginia, United States. Located along state routes 30, 33, and 249 in modern times, it is slightly west of the town of West Point. It was named for the Eltham plantation, across from West Point on the nearby Pamunkey River.

== Eltham Plantation ==
Captain William Bassett was from the Isle of Wight in England, and was given a contract to build a fort at Jamestown, Virginia. He married Bridget Cary, daughter of Colonel Miles Cary, of Southampton, England. He received the patent for Eltham Plantation and lands in 1647. As a minor, his son, later Colonel William Bassett, had a brick mansion built in New Kent County, Virginia, that was named "Eltham", after the Bassett family home in England. Colonel William Bassett (1671 - 1725) married Joanna Burwell, daughter of Lewis Burwell (1652 – c. 1710). Their son, also named William Bassett, married Elizabeth Churchill. Their son, Burwell Bassett (March 3, 1734 - January 4, 1793), married Anna Maria "Fanny" Bassett (1739–1777), sister to Martha Washington, and inherited Eltham plantation upon the death of his father. Burwell Bassett, Jr. (1788–1841), then inherited Eltham plantation upon the death of his father. He was a member of congress for thirty years, and died in 1841. At this time, the plantation passed to his brother, John Bassett (1768–1826). His son was George Washington Bassett, and his wife, Bettie Carter Brown, then inherited the plantation. Their son, George Washington Bassett, Jr., inherited the plantation. After the Civil War, the plantation home burned.

Eltham Plantation was owned by William Burwell Bassett and his wife, Anna Maria Dandridge, the sister of Martha Washington. Martha's husband, General George Washington galloped from Yorktown to Eltham on November 5, 1781, to the bedside of his stepson, John Parke Custis, who had contracted camp fever during the Yorktown Campaign and subsequently died at the Pamunkey River plantation.

Eltham Manor in Bassett, Virginia, is named for this plantation.

== Eltham's Landing ==
Eltham Landing played a prominent role for Union forces as a port during the 1862 Peninsula Campaign of the Civil War. The manor house was destroyed by fire in 1876. The New Kent - Charles City Chronicle is published here.

== Bibliography ==
- Civil War Sites Advisory Commission (CWSAC) Battle Summaries: Eltham's Landing. n.d. < >. Abstract: The American Battlefield Protection Program (ABPP) of the U.S. National Park Service presents the Civil War Sites Advisory Commission (CWSAC) battle summary of the Battle of Eltham's Landing, which was fought in New Kent County, Virginia. The summary of the inconclusive battle notes other names for the battle, its location, the campaign it was a part of, dates, commanders, forces engaged, estimated casualties, and battle description.
- Crocker, Amanda N. Eltham Village. 2006. Notes: Cover title. Prepared for the Department of Urban and Regional Planning, Virginia Commonwealth University. "The New Kent Comprehensive Plan designates seven areasa to capture future growth within the county. The Eltham area in the northeastern portion of the county is one of these designated areas."—8.
- Geological Survey (U.S.). Virginia, New Kent Quadrangle, 1930. Washington, D.C.: The Survey, 1930. Notes: This area can also be found on the following quadrangles: King and Queen Court House, New Kent, Truhart, West Point (all 7.5 minute series). Relief shown by contours and spot heights. "Contour interval on land 20 feet, with the 10 foot contour added; datum is mean sea level; contour interval off shore 20 feet, with 5 and 10 foot contour added." Shows marsh areas and bathymetry. R.B. Marshall, chief geographer, W.H. Herron, geographer in charge; topography by J.I. Gayetty [and others]; underwater contours based on U.S. Coast and Geodetic Survey charts; control by U.S. Geological Survey and U.S. Coast and Geodetic Survey. "Surveyed in cooperation with the War Department and with the state of Virginia." "First published in 1919." Description of USGS topographic maps on verso. Description: 1 map : color; 45 x 36 cm on sheet 51 x 42 cm. Cartographic Mathematical Data: Scale 1:62,500.
- Hosfield, Richard H. 2011. "The Battle of Eltham's Landing". Historical Society of West Point, Va. Bulletin. 4, no. 1:.
- Johnson, Kelly. 2014. "Eltham Plantation". New Kent Historical Society Newsletter. 2-6. Notes: Includes facsimile and photographs (some color). Other owners and/or occupants of the plantation included John Parke Custis, Burwell Bassett, John Bassett, George Washington Bassett, Union General William B. Franklin, R. T. Lacy, and the Taylor family. Eltham was the site of the death of John Parke Custis.
- Palmer, William A. The Battle of Eltham's Landing: May 7, 1862. 2012.
- Washington, George. Letter: Philadelphia, to Burwell Bassett Esqr., Eltham in New Kent Cty., Virginia. 1775. Notes: Autograph letter signed, part of a separate cover, franked by G.W., laminated, watermarked (LVG surmounted by crown and powder horn, & IV). Name on original manuscript appears as "G. Washington." Writings, III, 296-8. Papers of George Washington - Reel#6. Abstract: "I am now Imbarked on a tempestuous Ocean, from whence perhaps, no friendly harbour is to be found. I have been called upon by the unanimous voice of the Colonies to the Command of the Continental Army. It is an honour by no means aspired to. It is an honour I wished to avoid, as well from an unwillingness to quit the peaceful enjoyment of my Family, as from a thorough conviction of my own Incapacity and want of experience in the conduct of so momentous a concern ... I can answer but for three things, a firm belief of the justice of our Cause, close attention in the prosecution of it, and the strictest Integrity"—Fears for the cause and for his character if he fails—Congress in Committee have consented to a Continental Currency & have ordered 2 million dollars to be struck off for payment of troops & other expenses of defence—15,000 men voted as a Continental army, & he hopes more will be voted—other high officers not named yet—asks him and Mrs. Bassett to visit Mt. Vernon and take Mrs. W. down to [Eltham] with them—uneasy at leaving her alone at Mount Vernon.
