= Mann Page II =

American lawyer, politician and planter

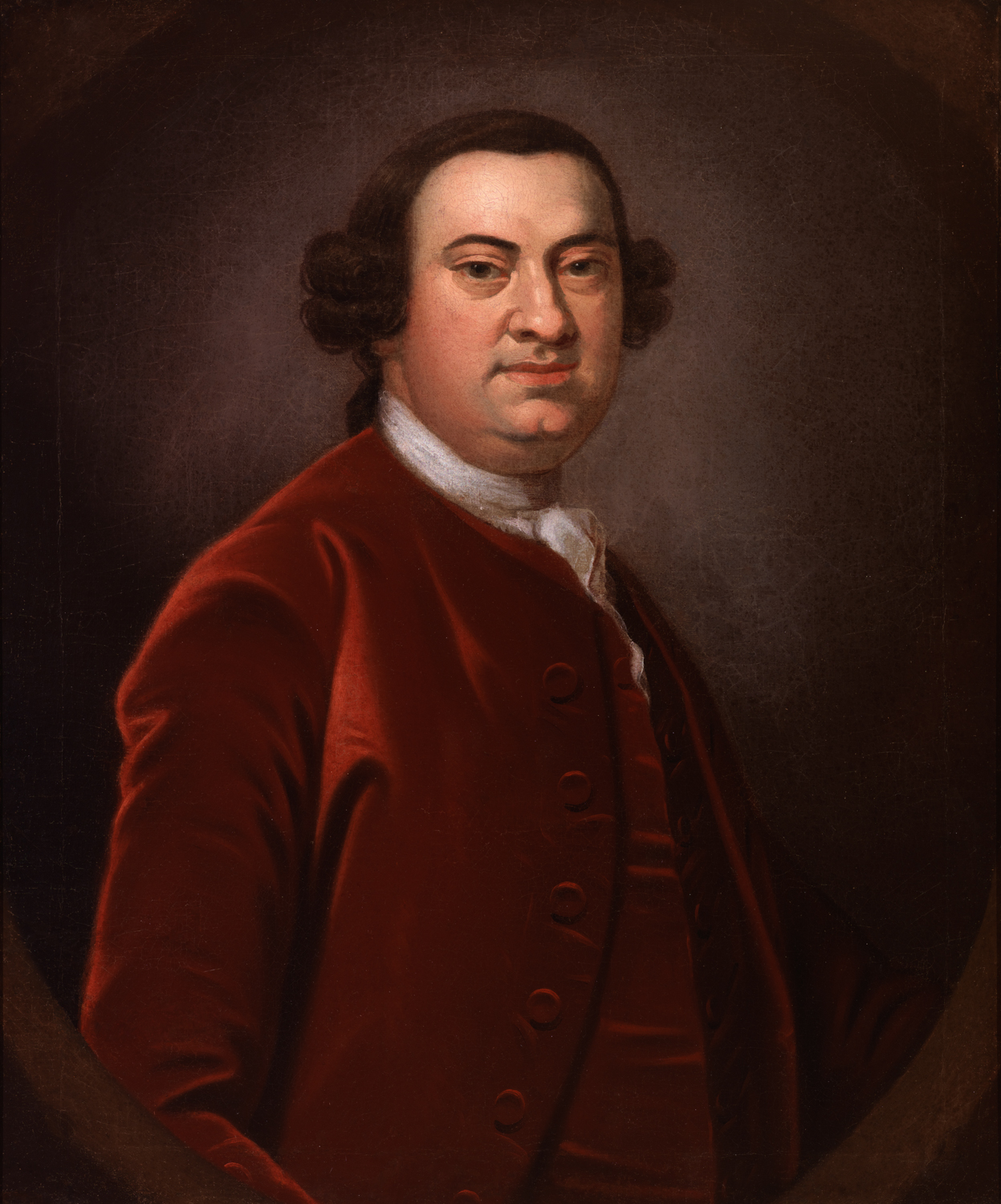
- Portrait by John Wollaston, c. 1755

Member of the House of Burgesses representing the College of William & Mary
- In office 1761–1765
- Preceded by: Beverley Randolph
- Succeeded by: John Blair Jr.

Personal details
- Born: c. 1718 Rosewell, Gloucester County, Colony of Virginia
- Died: 1778 (aged 59–60)
- Children: 7, including John Page and Mann Page

Mann Page II (c. 1718 – 1778) was an American lawyer, politician and planter from Spotsylvania County, Virginia, who served in the House of Burgesses. His children included 13th Virginia Governor John Page and Virginia delegate to the Continental Congress Mann Page.

== Early life ==
Mann was born c. 1718 in Gloucester County, Virginia, the eldest son of Mann Page I, a member of the Virginia Governor's Council, and his second wife, Judith Carter (daughter of King Carter, who also served on that council, also known as the Council of State). His first wife was Alice Grymes Page (daughter of John Grymes), and his second wife was Ann Corbin Tayloe (daughter of John Tayloe I). He was descended from Colonel John Page, who emigrated from Middlesex County in England to Bruton Parish in what was known as Middle Plantation but became Williamsburg in the Colony of Virginia circa 1650.

Page attended Eton College and the University of Oxford in England, and later attended the College of William & Mary, where he was a classmate and friend of Thomas Jefferson.

== Career and death ==
After his father's death, Page supervised completion of the Rosewell plantation mansion. Page sold off a significant portion of his vast land holdings to fund its completion. Page served in the Virginia legislature representing the College of William & Mary in the House of Burgesses in the 1760s. He served on the committee on Privileges and Elections, and the committee on Propositions and Grievances. Mann died in 1778.
