= John Page (Virginia politician) =

American politician (1743–1808)

- Portrait by John Wollaston, c. 1755–1758

13th Governor of Virginia
- In office December 1, 1802 – December 7, 1805
- Preceded by: James Monroe
- Succeeded by: William H. Cabell

Member of the U.S. House of Representatives from Virginia's 12th district
- In office March 4, 1793 – March 3, 1797
- Preceded by: District established
- Succeeded by: Thomas Evans

Member of the U.S. House of Representatives from Virginia's 7th district
- In office March 4, 1789 – March 3, 1793
- Preceded by: District established
- Succeeded by: Abraham B. Venable

Member of the Virginia House of Delegates from Gloucester County
- In office 1800; Alongside William Hall
- In office 1797; Alongside William Hall
- In office 1788; Alongside Thomas Smith, Jr.
- In office 1785–1786; Alongside Thomas Smith, Jr.
- In office 1781–1783; Alongside Thomas Smith, Jr.

President of the Virginia Council of State
- In office 1776–1779

Personal details
- Born: April 28, 1743; April 17, 1743 (O.S.) Rosewell Plantation, Colony of Virginia, British America
- Died: October 11, 1808 (aged 65) Richmond, Virginia, U.S.
- Party: Democratic-Republican
- Spouse(s): Frances Burwell; Margaret Lowther Page
- Children: 12
- Education: College of William and Mary

Military service
- Allegiance: United Kingdom; United States
- Branch/service: Virginia militia
- Rank: Colonel
- Battles/wars: French and Indian War; American Revolutionary War

John Page (April 28, 1743 – October 11, 1808) was an American planter, military officer and politician. He served as an officer in the American Revolutionary War, before being elected to the U.S. Congress and later as the 13th governor of Virginia.

== Early life ==
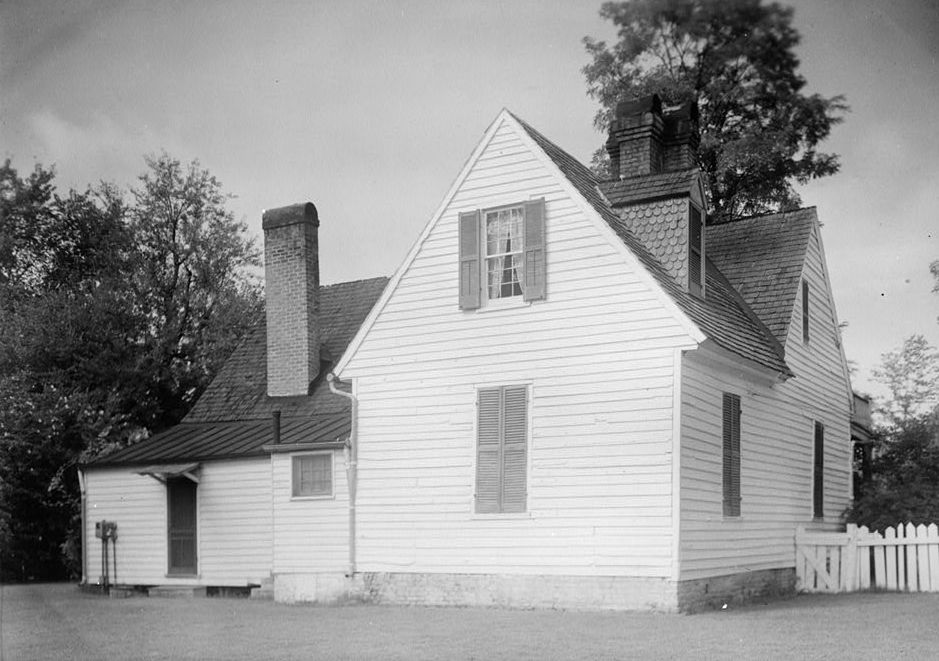
Governor John Page House, Williamsburg

Page was born and lived at Rosewell Plantation in Gloucester County. He was the son of Alice (Grymes) and Mann Page. His great-great-grandfather was Colonel John Page (1628–1692), an English merchant from Middlesex who emigrated to Virginia with his wife Alice Lucken Page and settled in Middle Plantation. He was the brother of Mann Page III.

John Page graduated from the College of William and Mary in 1763, where he was a close friend and college classmate of Thomas Jefferson, with whom he exchanged, as fellow revolutionaries, much correspondence.

== Career ==
=== Officer ===
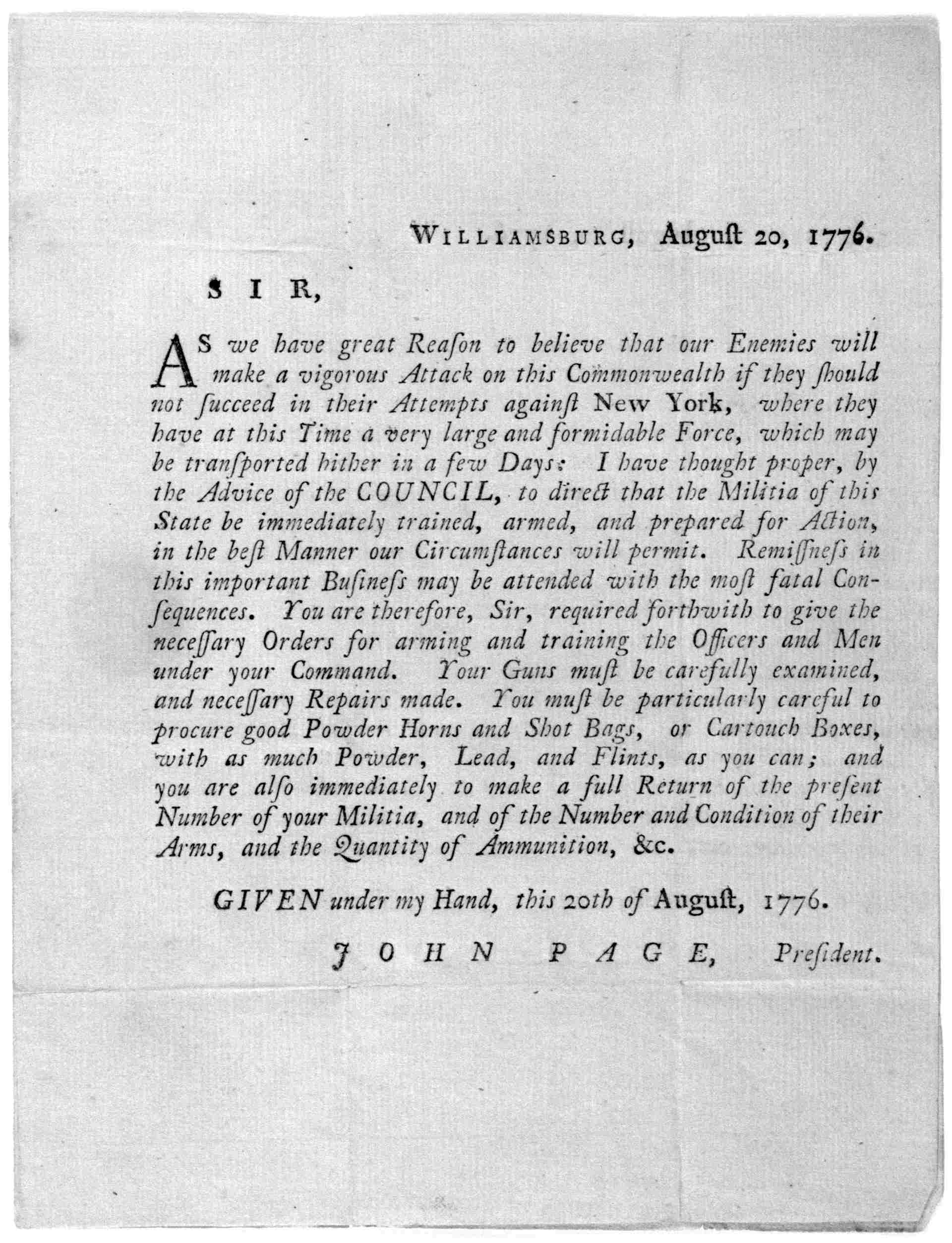
Broadside, order by John Page, president of the council, ordering state militia to be trained and prepared for battle, August 20, 1776

After he graduated from William and Mary, he then served under George Washington in an expedition during the French and Indian War. He also served during the American Revolutionary War as an officer in the Virginia state militia, raising a regiment from Gloucester County and supplementing it with personal funds. During that war, he attained the rank of colonel.

=== Planter ===
Page inherited wealth, including Rosewell plantation, but lacked business success as a planter, so after his death, when his debts became due, his family was forced to sell the plantation

=== Politician ===
Page was a Fifth Virginia Convention delegate in 1776. Page was also instrumental in getting his wife Frances' brother, Nathaniel Burwell, appointed to the Governor's council, and together, Page and Burwell opposed Lord Dunmore's proclamation against Patrick Henry. Page and Burwell built the council whose membership read like a list of Patriots, shaping the American Revolution against Britain.

The revolutionary Virginia legislature elected Page as the Lieutenant Governor of Virginia and served 1776–1779. Gloucester County voters elected him and Thomas Smith as their representatives in the new Virginia House of Delegates 1781–1783 and re-elected the pair three times to the one-year, part-time position until electing James Hubard to replace Page in 1784, only to reelect Page with Smith's namesake son, who served 1785 – 1788. However, when voters were asked to select delegates to the Virginia Ratifying Convention of 1788, they chose Warner Lewis alongside Thomas Smith, rather than this man. Nonetheless, the Page family remained politically powerful in Gloucester County, as voters elected Mann Page to succeed him for a term. However, they selected Mordecai Cooke and James Baytop, who became their repeatedly reelected delegates in Richmond.

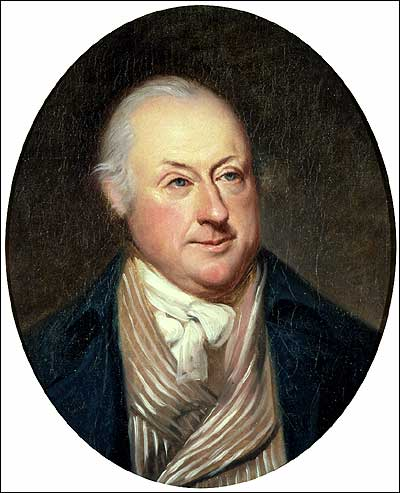
Portrait by Charles Willson Peale, c. 1790

Following ratification of the federal constitution, Page successfully ran for a seat in the First United States Congress and was reelected to the Second and Third, and to the Fourth as a member of the Democratic-Republican Party after that party had been created by Thomas Jefferson and James Madison. He was a Congressman from March 4, 1789, to March 3, 1797. He was elected a member of the American Philosophical Society in 1792.

After his terms in Congress, Page again won election as one of Gloucester County's representatives to the Virginia House of Delegates in 1797, alongside William Hall. However, only Hall won re-election in 1798, as Mordecai Cooke and several other men won the second seat. He was an unsuccessful candidate in the 1797 Virginia gubernatorial election, and ran in the 1799 U.S. Senate special election, in which he was defeated by Wilson Cary Nicholas. In 1800, Gloucester County voters again selected Page to sit alongside Hall and reelected neither, presumably in part because fellow legislators elected Page as Governor of Virginia. He also tried to return to Congress in 1801, but was defeated by Federalist nominee and former state delegate John Stratton.

Page became the Governor of Virginia in 1802 and served three consecutive one-year terms until 1805, the maximum allowed by the state constitution. After the end of his tenure, Page accepted a federal appointment as United States commissioner of loans for Virginia and held office until his death.

== Personal life ==
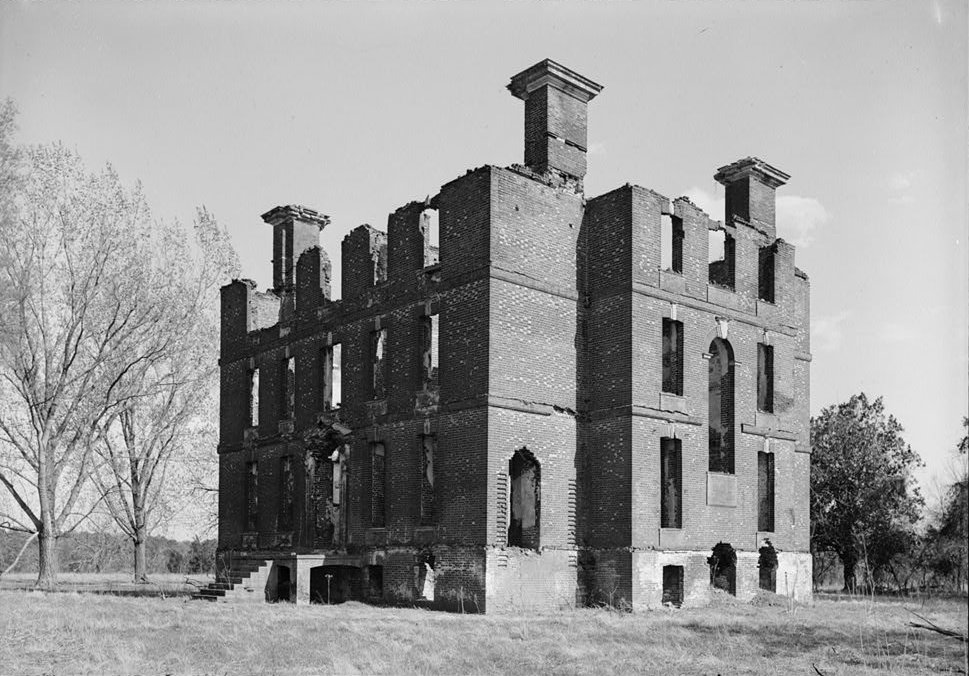
Remains of Page's Plantation, Rosewell, burned in 1916

In 1765, Page married Frances Burwell, daughter of Col. Robert "Robin" Burwell. Together, Frances and John were the parents of twelve children, though only seven lived to adulthood: Mann (1766–1813), Robert (b. 1770), Sally (b. 1771), Alice (b. 1775), Frances (b. 1777), Francis (b. 1781), and Judith (b. 1783). Of the seven who survived to adulthood, five married children of Gov. Thomas Nelson, thereby forging a significant alliance between the Page and Nelson families; there was also Burwell blood on both sides, the Burwells by these marriages becoming close relatives of the Page and Nelson families for at least three generations.

After the death of his first wife in 1784, Page remarried, this time to early American poet Margaret Lowther Page, who hosted a literary salon at the Rosewell Plantation. Page, himself also a poet, wrote several poems about national political issues, including Shays' Rebellion and the Virginia Religious Disestablishment Act (Virginia Statute for Religious Freedom). He and Margaret were parents to eight children. However, only three lived to see adulthood: Margaret (b. 1790), Barbara (b. 1795), and Lucy (b. 1807). Page's niece by marriage, Judith Lomax, was also a poet.

Page died in Richmond, Virginia, on October 11, 1808. He was interred in St. John's Churchyard in Richmond.

=== Legacy ===
The Page family is one of the First Families of Virginia. Its members include Colonel John Page, Governor John Page, his brother Mann Page, Thomas Nelson Page a leading proponent of the Lost Cause myth, and Virginian Railway builder William Nelson Page.

Page County, Virginia, located in the Shenandoah Valley, was formed in 1831 and named for Governor John Page. Also bearing his name is a residence hall at the College of William and Mary.

Governor Page was quoted by George W. Bush in his inaugural address in 2001. Writing to his friend Jefferson shortly after the Declaration of Independence was published, Page said of the Declaration and the Revolution: "We know the race is not to the swift nor the battle to the strong. Do you not think an angel rides in the whirlwind and directs this storm".

== Electoral history ==
- 1789; Page was elected to the U.S. House of Representatives, defeating Spencer Roane and Meriwether Smith
- 1790; Page was re-elected unopposed.

== See also ==
- John Page (Middle Plantation)
- Mann Page, Rosewell (plantation)

U.S. House of Representatives
Preceded by District established	Member of the U.S. House of Representatives from Virginia's 7th congressional district 1789–1793	Succeeded by Abraham B. Venable
Preceded by District established	Member of the U.S. House of Representatives from Virginia's 12th congressional district 1793–1797	Succeeded by Thomas Evans
Political offices
Preceded by James Monroe	Governor of Virginia; 1802–1805	Succeeded by William H. Cabell
