= Mann Page =

American lawyer, politician and planter

Mann Page III
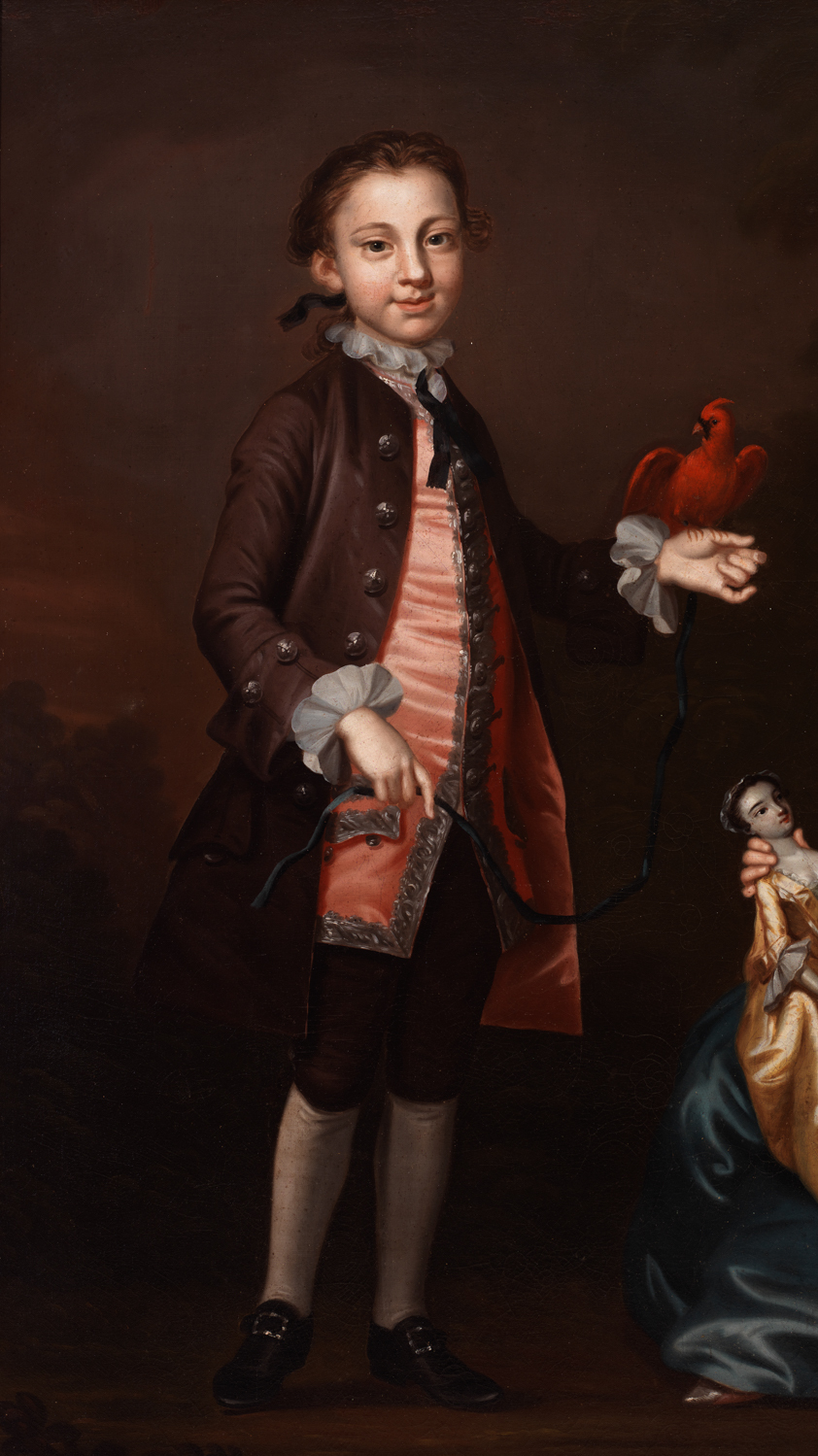
- Portrait by John Wollaston, c. 1755–1758

Delegate to the Continental Congress from Virginia
- In office 1777–1778

Member of the Virginia House of Delegates from Spotsylvania County
- In office October 7, 1776-December 21, 1778 Serving with George Thornton
- Preceded by: position established
- Succeeded by: Beverley Winslow

Member of the House of Burgesses from Spotsylvania County
- In office 1772-1776 Serving with George Stubblefield
- Preceded by: Benjamin Grymes
- Succeeded by: position abolished

Personal details
- Born: 1749 Rosewell Plantation, Gloucester County, Colony of Virginia
- Died: 1781 (aged 31–32) Mannfield Plantation, Spotsylvania County, Virginia
- Resting place: Mannfield plantation
- Spouse: Mary Tayloe
- Parent(s): Mann Page II and Ann Corbin Tayloe
- Education: College of William and Mary

Mann Page III (1749 – 1781) was an American lawyer, politician and planter from Spotsylvania County, Virginia, who served in the House of Burgesses and first Virginia House of Delegates as well as a delegate for Virginia to the Continental Congress in 1777. His elder half brother was Virginia Governor John Page. Since the name was common in the family, and five men of the same name served in the Virginia General Assembly (three of them during this man's political career), relationships are discussed below.

== Early life ==
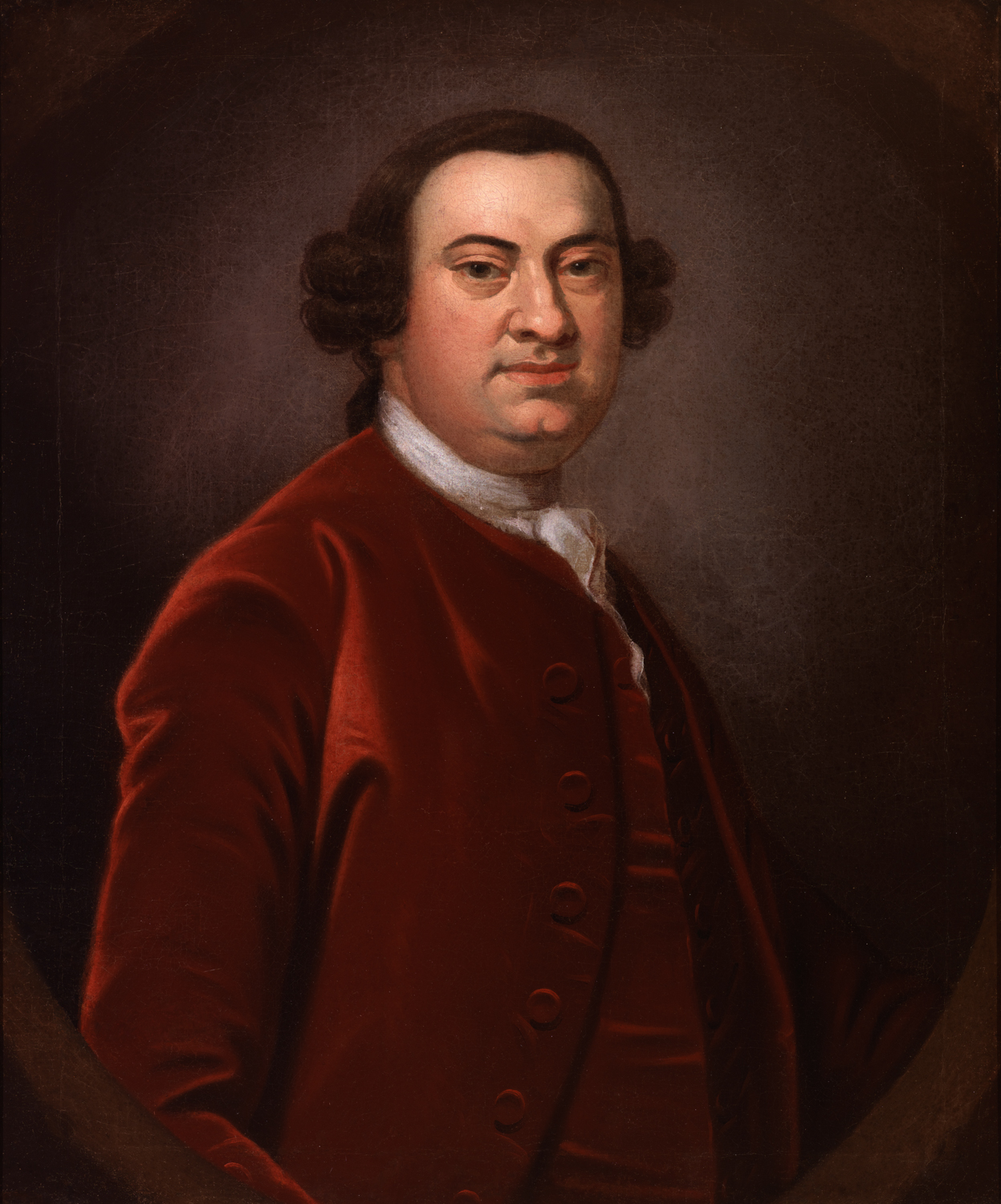
c. 1755 portrait of Page's father by John Wollaston

Mann was born to Mann Page II and Ann Corbin Tayloe, daughter of John Tayloe I, (his second wife) at Rosewell Plantation in Gloucester County, Virginia. The Page family was one of the First Families of Virginia, who not only held political power and significant estates, but also often intermarried. They were descended from Col. John Page, who emigrated from Middlesex County in England to Bruton Parish in what was known as Middle Plantation but became Williamsburg in the Colony of Virginia circa 1650. His second wife Mary Mann had given birth to the progenitor's only surviving son, Matthew Page, who named his son Mann Page (1691-1730) to honor his mother. Mann Page I had founded Rosewell Plantation. Mann Page II (1717- after 1764) was the eldest son of Mann Page I, a member of the Virginia Governor's Council, and his second wife, Judith Carter (daughter of King Carter, who also served on that council, also known as the Council of State). Although Mann Page II married twice, the date of his death is unknown, since it was not inscribed on his tombstone. He also may have been the first man of that name to serve in the Virginia legislature, for someone of that name represented the College of William and Mary (not hugely far from Gloucester County) in the House of Burgesses in 1761. By his first wife, Alice Grymes Page, he had a son (this man's half-brother), John Page who would eventually become Governor of Virginia (as well as marry twice and have many children including Mann Page 1766–1813 who is best known for establishing Selby in Gloucester County although he is buried in Hanover County in the Berkeley family graveyard at Airwells), and a daughter Maria Judith Page, who in 1735 married William Randolph III, the son of Thomas Randolph (of Tuckahoe) and the grandson of William Randolph I, and had four children. This man, Mann Page III (or Mann Page Jr.), was the first child born of his father's second marriage, but his only brothers to survive to adulthood were Robert Page (born 1751) who moved to Hanover County, Virginia and Gwynn Page (b. 1758) who moved to Kentucky although some of his descendants returned to Virginia. The family also included sisters Betsey Page Harrison (b. 1762 and who married Benjamin Harrison of Prince George County in 1782) and Lucy Burwell Page (b. 1764) who married Col. George Baylor and had six children before being widowed, then marrying Col. Nathaniel Burwell of Clarke County, Virginia. Meanwhile, this Mann Page attended the College of William & Mary before reading law.

On April 18, 1776, this Mann Page married Mary Tayloe, the fifth child of John Tayloe of Spotsylvania County, who died three years later. Mann and Mary had three children: Maria Page (b. 1777) who married Lewis Burwell, Lucy Gwynn Page (b. 1779) who married Josiah Tidball) and Mann Page IV (1781) (whose wife's name is unknown, but who also served in Virginia's legislature and whose son Mann Page V in 1827 married Mary Champe Willis in Orange County, Virginia, and who after her death studied medicine and moved to Mississippi.

== Career and death ==
Page moved to Spotsylvania County and established his own plantation, known as Mannsfield Plantation near Fredericksburg, constructing the manor house as an almost direct replica of Mount Airy, the Tayloe family seat. He and veteran George Stubblefield twice won elections to represent Spotsylvania County part-time in the House of Burgesses, for the terms beginning in 1772 and in 1774 until Governor Lord Dunmore closed the assembly in 1776. Spotsylvnaia County electors then elected Page and Stubblefield as their representatives to the First, Second, Third, Fourth and Fifth Virginia Conventions. Page and George Thornton then served as Spotsylvania County's first representatives in the Virginia House of Delegates, in the session of 1776, when members elected him as one of Virginia's representatives to the Continental Congress.

Page served one term in the Continental Congress. He defended a slave named Billy who wrote a letter to Thomas Jefferson and was sentenced to death by hanging for treason as a result. Billy was pardoned in 1781 after Page and two jury members sent a letter arguing that, as a slave, he was not a citizen and thus could not commit treason against a government to which he owed no allegiance.

== Death and legacy ==
Mann Page died at home in 1781, and was buried in the family plot at Mannsfield. The plantation was mostly destroyed during the Battle of Fredericksburg in the Civil War, but a remnant remains within the battlefield park.

The ruins of Rosewell Plantation, the home of early members of the Page family and one of the finest mansions built in the colonies, sit on the banks of the York River in Gloucester County. In 1916, a fire swept the mansion, leaving only a shell. It later became a site of archaeological studies.

== See also ==
- John Page (Middle Plantation)
