= Thomas Evans (Virginia politician) =

American politician

Member of the U.S. House of Representatives from Virginia's 12th district
- In office March 4, 1797- 1801
- Preceded by: John Page
- Succeeded by: John Stratton

Member of the Virginia House of Delegates from Ohio County

Member of the Virginia House of Delegates from Accomac County

Personal details
- Born: circa 1735 Accomack County, Colony of Virginia, British America
- Died: February 12, 1815 Accomack County, Virginia
- Party: Federalist
- Spouse: Sarah
- Children: 3 sons, 5 daughters
- Education: College of William and Mary
- Profession: surveyor, lawyer, politician

Thomas Evans (ca. 1755 – February 12, 1815) was an eighteenth- and nineteenth-century congressman and lawyer from Virginia.

== Early and family life ==
Born in Accomack County, Virginia to Thomas Evans. His birth date is unknown, because a man named Thomas Evans (possibly this man's grandfather) wrote a will which was admitted to probate in 1751. That will stated he had given money to his son Thomas to buy a plantation from Thomas Custis. That will also named a sister Mary and a brother Isaiah.

This Thomas Evans attended the College of William and Mary and received a prize in 1775. He studied law.

== Career ==
He was admitted to the Virginia bar, and also operated a plantation using enslaved labor. In 1785-1786, Evans also surveyed what became Drummondtown, Virginia (now Accomac

Elected to represent Accomack County in the Virginia House of Delegates in 1780, 1781 and from 1794 to 1796. Evans was later elected a Federalist to the United States House of Representatives in 1796, serving from 1797 to 1801. There, he was appointed one of the impeachment managers to conduct the impeachment proceedings against Tennessee Senator William Blount in 1798.

In 1802, Evans moved to Wheeling, Virginia (now West Virginia) and once again became a member of the House of Delegates, serving in 1805 and 1806.

== Death and legacy ==
Evans died in Accomac County in 1815.

== Personal life ==
He married Sarah, who bore three sons and five daughters who reached adulthood.

U.S. House of Representatives
Preceded by John Page	Member of the U.S. House of Representatives from Virginia's 12th congressional district March 4, 1797 – March 3, 1801 (obsolete district)	Succeeded by John Stratton
