= John Stratton =

John Stratton may refer to:

- John Stratton (actor) (1925–1991), British actor
- John Stratton (Virginia politician) (1769–1804), American congressman and lawyer from Virginia
- John L. N. Stratton (1817–1889), American Republican Party politician in New Jersey
- John Stratton (Air Force), American soccer defender and fighter pilot
- John Stratton (cricketer) (1875–1919), English cricketer
- John Stratton, President, Verizon Enterprise Solutions
- John Young Stratton (1829/30-1905), British rural poverty reformer

== See also ==
- John Roach Straton (1875-1929), American Baptist pastor
