= John Grymes (burgess) =

Virginia colony tobacco planter (1693–1743)

Member of the House of Burgesses for Middlesex County
- In office 1718–1722 Serving with Gawin Corbin
- Preceded by: William Blackburn
- Succeeded by: Mathew Kemp

Personal details
- Born: 1691 Grymesby plantation, Middlesex County, Colony of Virginia
- Died: November 2, 1748 (aged 56–57) Brandon plantation, Middlesex County, Virginia
- Occupation: planter, politician
- Known for: planter and burgess

John Grymes or Grimes (1691 – November 2, 1748) was a Virginia planter and politician who served in both houses of the Virginia General Assembly, first representing Middlesex County in the House of Burgesses (1718-1722) and on Virginia Governor's Council (1726-1748).

== Early life and education ==
The elder of two sons born to the former Alice Townley (1675–1710) of Gloucester County (granddaughter of burgess Augustine Warner) and her husband John Grymes (Grimesby, 1660–August 28, 1709). His grandfather, Rev. Charles Grymes (1612-1661) had emigrated from England to then-large Gloucester County, Virginia. The family included a younger brother Charles Grymes (1693–1743) and sisters Anne (1689–1730; who never married) and Elizabeth Lucy Grymes (1692–1750) who married John Holcomb, and whose son (also John Holcombe) would serve in the House of Virginia Delegates, as would several of this man's grandsons.

== Career ==
Their father built a plantation called "Grymesby" in Middlesex County, which this man inherited when he reached legal age, along with all his father's lands in Middlesex, Gloucester and King and Queen Counties. He built a plantation he called "Brandon" in that county, which he operated using enslaved labor, as had his father.

In 1717 Middlesex County voters elected John Grymes as one of their delegates in the House of Burgesses, where he served alongside fellow planter Gawin Corbin and was re-elected once. In 1726, Grymes received an appointment to the Virginia Governor's Council, and served until 1748. He briefly served as the colony's auditor general in 1718 and the colony's receiver general from 1732 until his death.

== Personal life ==
Coat of Arms of John Grymes

On December 22, 1715, at her father's Green Spring plantation near Williamsburg, John Grymes married Lucy Ludwell (1698-1748), the daughter of wealthy merchant and planter Philip Ludwell. They had five sons and four daughters, of whom about half survived to adulthood and had children. Their eldest son, Philip Grymes (1721-1762), married Mary Randolph to cement his family's ties to the First Families of Virginia and succeeded his father both as governor's councilor and as Brandon's owner. Although his namesake son John never reached adulthood (or died at a plantation also named Green Spring in Louisa County, Virginia in 1749) and Charles died as a boy in 1727, this man hired a painter to portray his youngest sons, Benjamin Grymes (1725-1774; who moved to Spotsylvania County, which he represented in the House of Burgesses) and Ludwell Grymes (1733-1795). His daughters included: Lucy Ludwell Grymes (1720-1792) who married burgess Carter Burwell and Alice Grymes (1724-1746) who married burgess Mann Page II, as well as Hannah (who may not have married), and Sarah (who died as an infant).

== Death and legacy ==
Grymes died on November 2, 1748, and his widow on March 3, 1749. Both are buried at Christ Church in Middlesex County, on whose vestry this man had served for decades.
