= Virginia's 12th congressional district =

1793–1863 US congressional district

Coordinates: 37°50′N 80°50′W

- Obsolete district
- Created: 1793
- Eliminated: 1863
- Years active: 1793–1863

Virginia's 12th congressional district is an obsolete U.S. congressional district. It was eliminated in 1863 after the 1860 U.S. census. Its last member of Congress was Kellian V. Whaley.

== List of members representing the district ==
Representative	Party	Term	Cong ress	Electoral history
District established March 4, 1793
John Page (Gloucester County)	Anti-Administration	March 4, 1793 – March 3, 1795	3rd 4th	Redistricted from the 7th district and re-elected in 1793. Re-elected in 1795. Lost re-election.
John Page (Gloucester County)	Democratic-Republican	March 4, 1795 – March 3, 1797	3rd 4th	Redistricted from the 7th district and re-elected in 1793. Re-elected in 1795. Lost re-election.
Thomas Evans	Federalist	March 4, 1797 – March 3, 1801	5th 6th	Elected in 1797. Re-elected in 1799. Retired.
John Stratton	Federalist	March 4, 1801 – March 3, 1803	7th	Elected in 1801. Retired.
Thomas Griffin (Yorktown)	Federalist	March 4, 1803 – March 3, 1805	8th	Elected in 1803. Lost re-election.
Burwell Bassett (Williamsburg)	Democratic-Republican	March 4, 1805 – March 3, 1813	9th 10th 11th 12th	Elected in 1805. Re-elected in 1807. Re-elected in 1809. Re-elected in 1811. Redistricted to the 13th district and lost re-election.
John Roane (Uppowac)	Democratic-Republican	March 4, 1813 – March 3, 1815	13th	Redistricted from the 11th district and re-elected in 1813. Retired.
William H. Roane (Dunkirk)	Democratic-Republican	March 4, 1815 – March 3, 1817	14th	Elected in 1815. Retired.
Robert S. Garnett (Lloyds)	Democratic-Republican (Note: Supported the Crawford faction in the 1824 United States presidential election)	March 4, 1817 – March 3, 1825	15th 16th 17th 18th 19th	Elected in 1817. Re-elected in 1819. Re-elected in 1821. Re-elected in 1823. Re-elected in 1825. Retired.
Robert S. Garnett (Lloyds)	Jacksonian	March 4, 1825 – March 3, 1827	15th 16th 17th 18th 19th	Elected in 1817. Re-elected in 1819. Re-elected in 1821. Re-elected in 1823. Re-elected in 1825. Retired.
John Roane (Rumford Academy)	Jacksonian	March 4, 1827 – March 3, 1831	20th 21st	Elected in 1827. Re-elected in 1829. Retired.
John J. Roane (Rumford Academy)	Jacksonian	March 4, 1831 – March 3, 1833	22nd	Elected in 1831. Retired.
William F. Gordon (Charlottesville)	Jacksonian	March 4, 1833 – March 3, 1835	23rd	Elected in 1833. Lost re-election.
James Garland (Lovingston)	Jacksonian	March 4, 1835 – March 3, 1837	24th 25th 26th	Elected in 1835. Re-elected in 1837. Re-elected in 1839. Lost re-election.
James Garland (Lovingston)	Democratic	March 4, 1837 – March 3, 1839	24th 25th 26th	Elected in 1835. Re-elected in 1837. Re-elected in 1839. Lost re-election.
James Garland (Lovingston)	Conservative	March 4, 1839 – March 3, 1841	24th 25th 26th	Elected in 1835. Re-elected in 1837. Re-elected in 1839. Lost re-election.
Thomas W. Gilmer (Charlottesville)	Whig	March 4, 1841 – March 3, 1843	27th	Elected in 1841. Redistricted to the 5th district.
Augustus A. Chapman (Union)	Democratic	March 4, 1843 – March 3, 1847	28th 29th	Elected in 1843. Re-elected in 1845. Retired.
William B. Preston (Blacksburg)	Whig	March 4, 1847 – March 3, 1849	30th	Elected in 1847. Appt. Secretary of the Navy.
Henry A. Edmundson (Salem)	Democratic	March 4, 1849 – March 3, 1861	31st 32nd 33rd 34th 35th 36th	Elected in 1849. Re-elected in 1851. Re-elected in 1853. Re-elected in 1855. Re-elected in 1857. Re-elected in 1859. Retired.
Kellian V. Whaley (Ceredo)	Union	March 4, 1861 – March 3, 1863	37th	Elected in 1861. Retired.
District dissolved March 4, 1863
