= Billy (slave) =

Enslaved man from Virginia

Billy (c. 1754 – c. 1785) was an enslaved man from Virginia who was charged with treason during the American Revolution. He was pardoned in 1781 after a letter was written arguing that, as a slave, he was not a citizen and thus could not commit treason against a government to which he owed no allegiance.

== Pre-trial life ==
Very little is known about Billy's life aside from his trial. He was likely born around 1754 and historians believe that he is possibly the same Billy that was enslaved by the wealthy planter John Tayloe II (Note: Correspondence between Mann Page and Thomas Jefferson has one letter asserting that Billy had been part of Tayloe's estate.) who had one of his employees place an advertisement about a runaway "mulatto" in 1774. In the advertisement, Tayloe's employee stated that Billy was a runaway slave and an extremely skilled worker. Historian Lathan A. Windley believes that during this time Billy purchased a forged pass with the intent to liberate himself by travelling to another state.

== Trial ==
On April 2, 1781, Billy was indicted by the Prince William County Court for committing treasonous acts against the state of Virginia. Billy had been charged with joining the British forces aboard an armed vessel with the intent to fight against the colonies during the American Revolutionary War. This was not an uncommon accusation during this period, as many enslaved people had been promised their freedom in return for fighting for the British (see Black Loyalists); however, Billy argued that he had been forced onto the ship and that he had never taken up arms. Despite this, Billy was convicted and sentenced to death by hanging.

Two of the jury members, Henry Lee II and William Carr, along with Mann Page, argued against Billy's death sentence and wrote a letter to Thomas Jefferson, then Governor of Virginia, to appeal for clemency. Lee and Carr felt that an enslaved person "not being Admitted to the Priviledges [sic] of a Citizen owes the State No Allegiance and that the Act declaring what shall be treason cannot be intended by the Legislature to include slaves who have neither lands or other property to forfeit." Their actions were successful, as Jefferson granted Billy a reprieve and the state legislature officially pardoned Billy on June 14. Nothing was written of what happened to Billy after he was pardoned.

== Later reception ==
Lee and Carr's argument contrasted with previous, similar cases of enslaved people charged with treason. Historians H. J. Eckenrode and Philip J. Schwarz commented on the decision, with Eckenrode writing that this "was a new doctrine, fruit of Revolutionary humanitarianism" and Schwartz stating that "His case was doubly ironic. A slave, he was nevertheless tried for disobeying one of the laws of the commonwealth. Excluded from the protections conferred by citizenship, he was still shielded from execution because Virginia's law of treason could not logically apply to him."
