= Thomas Griffin (politician) =

American politician (1773–1837)

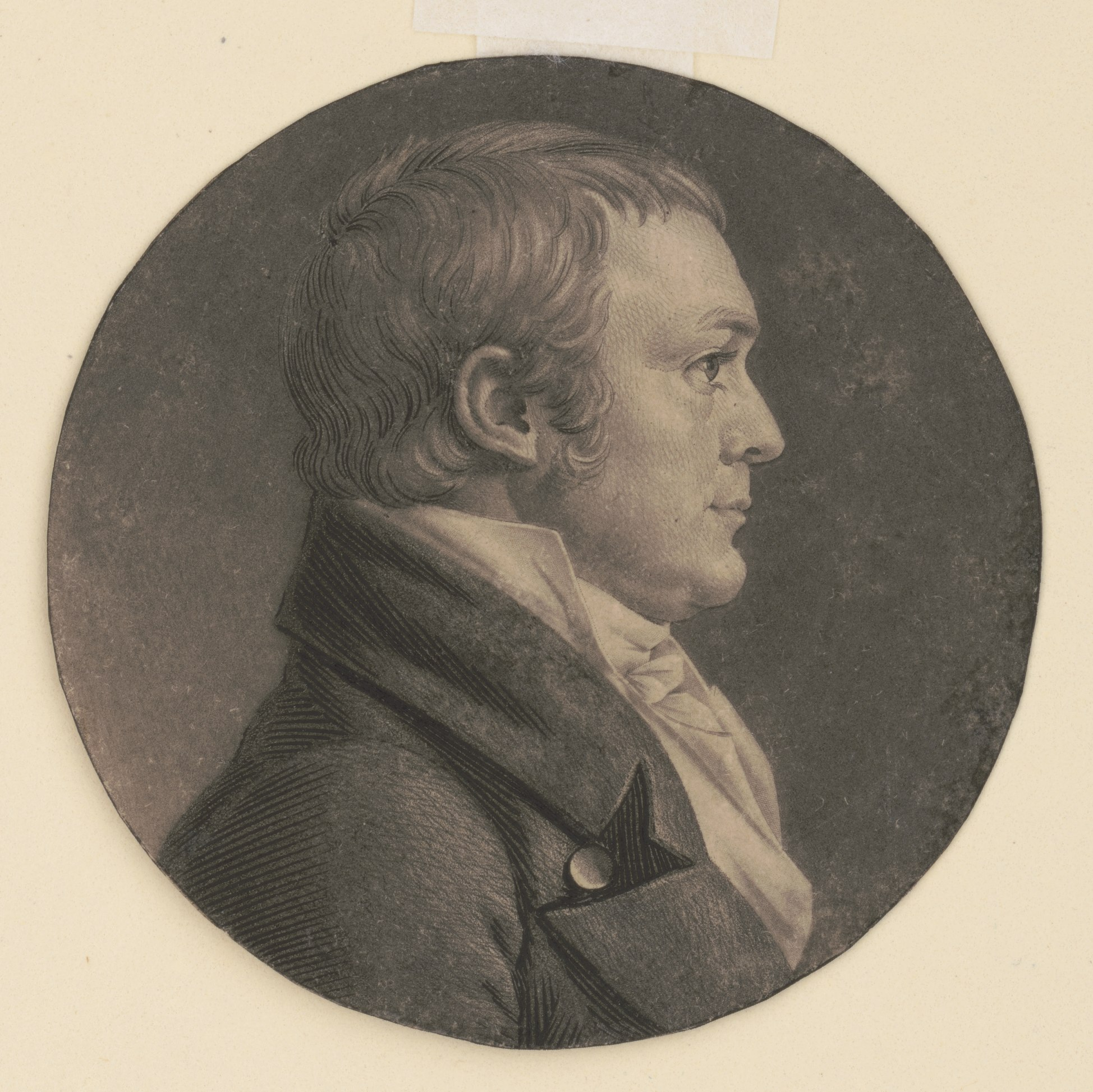
- Thomas Griffin, engraving by Charles Balthazar Julien Févret de Saint-Mémin

Member of the U.S. House of Representatives from Virginia's 12th district
- In office March 4, 1803 – March 3, 1805
- Preceded by: John Stratton
- Succeeded by: Burwell Bassett

Member of the Virginia House of Delegates from York County
- In office December 3, 1827 – December 5, 1830 Serving with Robert Sheild
- Preceded by: Thomas C. Russell
- Succeeded by: district merged with James City County

Member of the Virginia House of Delegates from York County
- In office December 6, 1819 – November 30, 1823 Serving with William McCandlish, Robert P. Waller, Scervant Jones
- Preceded by: Robert Pescud
- Succeeded by: Thomas C. Russell

Member of the Virginia House of Delegates from York County
- In office October 21, 1793 – November 30, 1800 Serving with Hugh Nelson, Samuel Shield, William Waller
- Preceded by: Robert Shield
- Succeeded by: John Waller

Personal details
- Born: Cyrus Griffin; July 16, 1773 Yorktown, Colony of Virginia, British America
- Died: October 7, 1837 (aged 64) Yorktown, Virginia
- Spouse: Mary Griffin

Military service
- Allegiance: United States of America
- Branch/service: Virginia militia
- Years of service: 1812-1814
- Rank: Major
- Battles/wars: War of 1812

Thomas Griffin (1773 – October 7, 1837) was an eighteenth and nineteenth century politician, planter, lawyer and judge from Virginia.

== Early and family life ==
Born in Yorktown, Virginia to Dr. Corbin Griffin and his wife. His ancestors journeyed to the colony nearly a century earlier, and settled on Virginia's Northern Neck, as well as in the Yorktown/Williamsburg area (the colony's capital as the conflict began). His namesake, Thomas Griffin, was the son of Col. Leroy Griffin of Richmond County, and began the family's political prominence when he served as a burgess in 1718-1723. His father was a prominent local patriot during the American Revolutionary War: as a member of the York County Committee of Safety (1775-1776), and then as surgeon in the Virginia line. Meanwhile, young Thomas remained received a private education suitable to his class, then studied law. He married his cousin Mary, daughter of prominent lawyer and patriot, then U.S. District Judge Cyrus Griffin.

== Career ==
After being admitted to the Virginia bar, Griffin practiced law, as well as operated a plantation using enslaved labor. In the last census before his death, he owned 29 enslaved people, and his household also included a free Black woman of between 24 and 35 years old.

Voters in York County first elected Griffin as one of their two representatives in the Virginia House of Delegates in 1793, and he won re-election each year until 1800.

During this part-time legislative service, Griffin also accepted an appointment as a justice of the court of oyer and terminer on October 17, 1796, serving until 1810.

In 1802, Congressman John Stratton having announced his retirement, Griffin won election as a Federalist to the United States House of Representatives in 1802, serving from 1803 to 1805. Democratic Republican Burwell Bassett defeated him in 1804 (and would win re-election several times.

Griffin was then appointed chief justice of the Court of Quarter Sessions in Yorktown on September 1, 1805, serving until 1810 when he became a justice of the York County Court, serving as this until 1812.

During the War of 1812, British ships threatened the Hampton Roads area. Griffin served as a major of Infantry, and was second in command during the Battle of Hampton.

After the war, Griffin again became a justice of the court of oyer and terminer, this time as chairman of the court, serving from 1814 to 1820.

In 1819, voters again elected Griffin as one of their representatives in the Virginia House of Delegates, and re-elected him, so he served from 1819 to 1823. He again won election and re-election from 1827 to 1830, but following the Virginia Constitutional Convention of 1829-1830, the Tidewater area lost representatives and more were allocated to western Virginia, so the York County district was merged with neighboring James City County.

== Death and legacy ==
Griffin died at "The Mansion" near Yorktown, Virginia on October 7, 1837.

U.S. House of Representatives
Preceded by John Stratton	Member of the U.S. House of Representatives from Virginia's 12th congressional district March 4, 1803 – March 3, 1805 (obsolete district)	Succeeded by Burwell Bassett
