= John Page (planter) =

English-born planter, merchant, slave trader and politician (1627–1692)

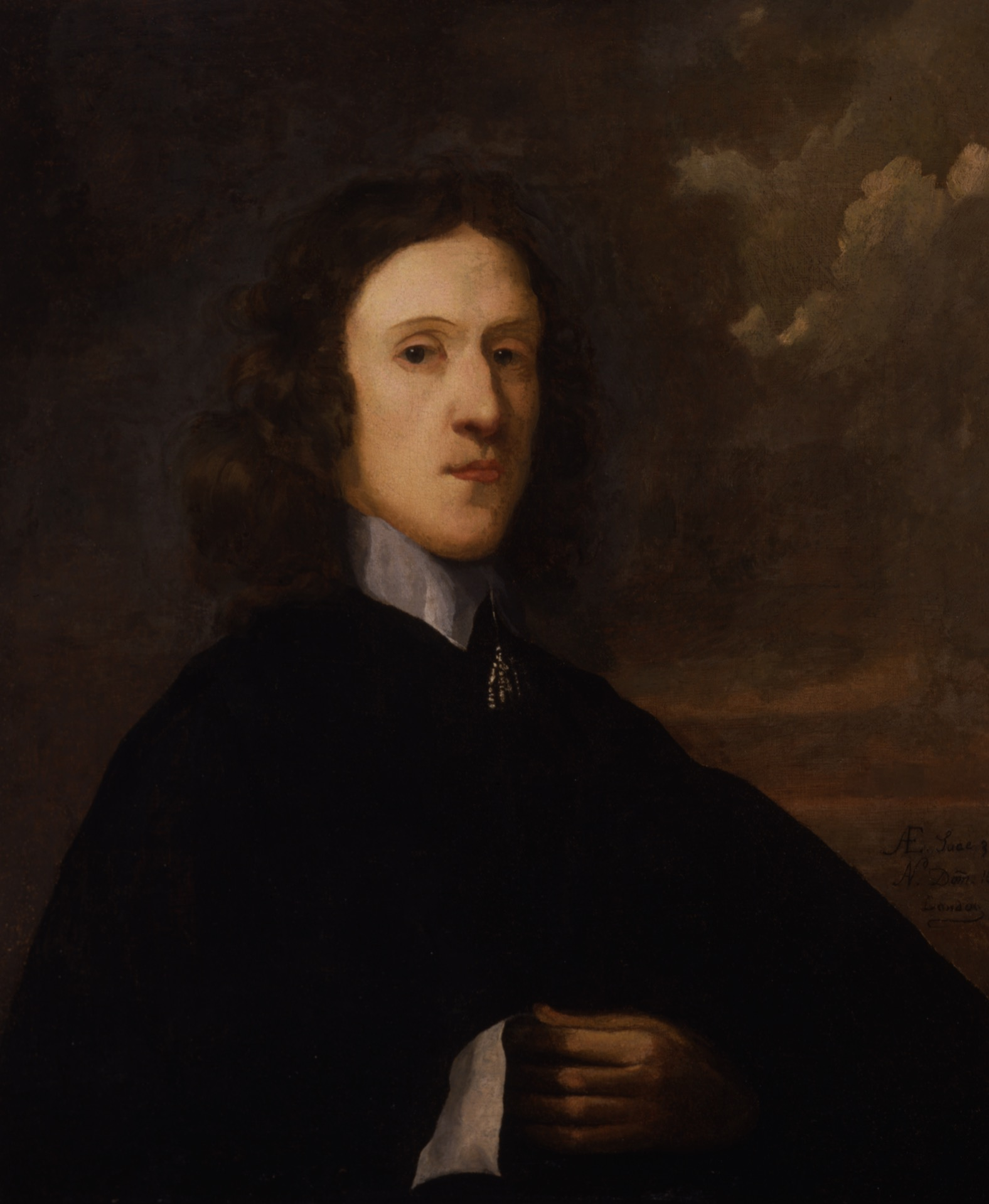
- Portrait, c. 1660
- Born: 1627; Bedfont, Middlesex
- Died: January 23, 1692 (aged 64); James City County, Virginia, British America
- Occupations: Merchant, politician, slave trader, planter
- Years active: 1645–1692

Member of the House of Burgesses
- In office 1665–1677
- Governor: Governor Sir William Berkeley

Member of the Virginia Governor's Council
- In office 1677 – January 23, 1692
- Governor: Governor Herbert Jeffries; Governor Thomas Culpeper; Acting Governor Nicholas Spencer; Governor Francis Howard

Colonel John Page (c. 1627 – 23 January 1692) was an English-born planter, merchant, slave trader and politician who spent most of his life in North America. Born in Bedfont, Middlesex, Page eventually migrated to the English colony of Virginia, where he lived in Middle Plantation and served as a member of the House of Burgesses from 1665 to 1677 and a member of the Virginia Governor's Council from 1677 to 1692. A wealthy landowner, Page donated land and funds towards construction of the Bruton Parish Church. Page was also involved in the establishment of the College of William & Mary in 1693, as well as being a chief proponent of Middle Plantation being designated the colony's capital in 1698.

His efforts eventually resulted in the renaming of Middle Plantation as Williamsburg in 1699, perhaps most well known as the birthplace of democratic governmental principals among Patriot revolutionaries before and during the American Revolution. In the 21st century, Page's Middle Plantation residence serves the modern home of the restored colonial-era tourism destination known as Colonial Williamsburg, a popular travel destination in Virginia.

== Biography ==
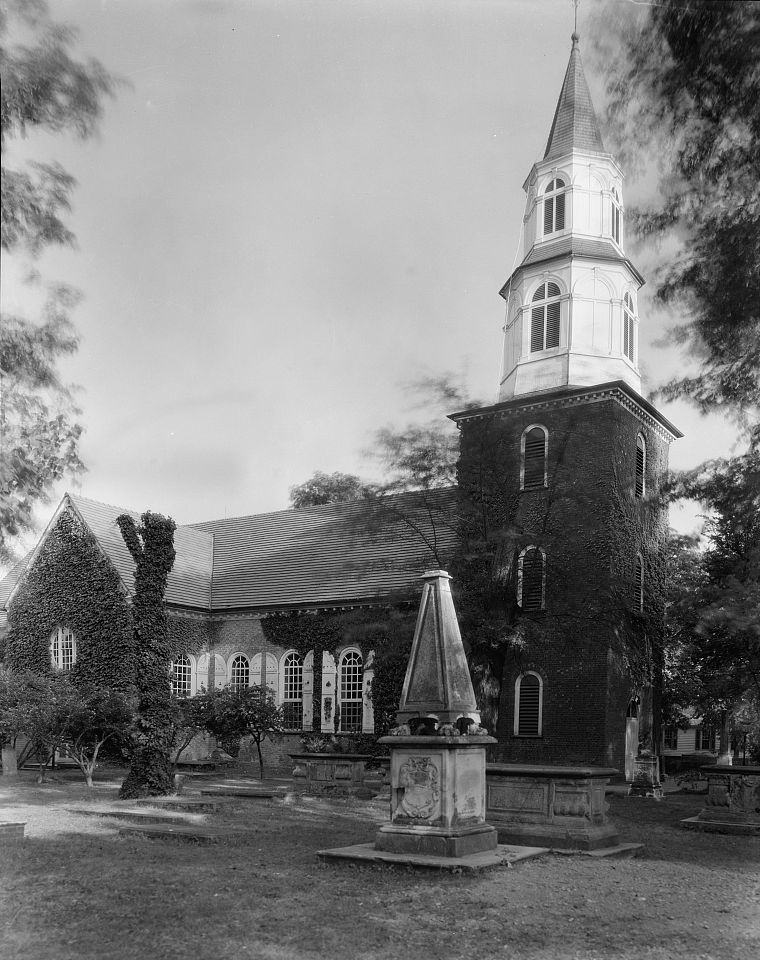
Bruton Parish Church, Williamsburg, Virginia. Original church built 1683 on land donated by Colonel John Page. The shaft commemorating Col. Page is at right of the church door in this photograph by Frances Benjamin Johnston.

John Page was born around 1627, likely in Bedfont, Middlesex, the parish records for which do not survive for that period. He was a son of Francis Page, gentleman, of that parish.

John Page became a merchant, and emigrated to the Virginia colony; his sister Elizabeth (wife of Edward Digges) and brother Matthew also emigrated to Virginia. John Page married Alice Luckin of Sandon, Essex, in roughly 1646, and Page claimed her as a headright in 1653, suggesting they were both in Virginia by the mid-1650s. She was a first cousin, once removed of the first Luckyn baronet. The Pages originally lived in the New Towne section at Jamestown.

The Pages settled in York County in 1655. In 1662, the Pages had a large brick cross-plan house built in nearby Middle Plantation. A wealthy landowner, Page owned 330 acres (1.3 km^{2}) in Middle Plantation, including much of what is now Duke of Gloucester Street, Nicholson Street, and part of Francis Street in the restored area of Colonial Williamsburg. In 1672, Page patented 3600 acres (15 km^{2}) in New Kent County which became Mehixton Plantation. He donated land and £20 for the first brick Bruton Parish Church which was completed in 1683, and was located immediately adjacent to the site of the present larger restored structure. In 1683, he came into possession of a tract of land which originally belonged to his brother Matthew in James City County known as Neck of Land. It is also known that he owned property at Jamestown in New Towne section.

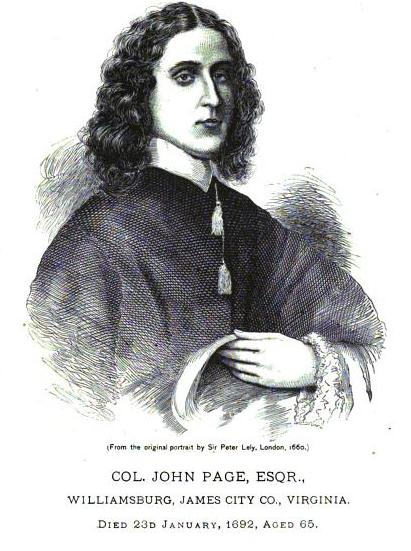
Col. John Page of Middle Plantation, Williamsburg, Virginia

John Page was a member of the Virginia House of Burgesses starting in 1665. He played a pivotal role in supporting the efforts of Reverend Doctor James Blair in the founding of the College of William & Mary in 1693, which was located at Middle Plantation. Beginning in 1677, he is believed to have been an early advocate for moving the capitol to Middle Plantation, which eventually occurred in 1699, seven years after his death. (Middle Plantation was renamed Williamsburg in honor of King William III shortly thereafter).

The Royal African Company's agent in Virginia in the 1670s, the Colonel was heavily involved in the Atlantic slave trade, not only trading and profiting on the chattel slave trade of human beings (agents received a seven-percent commission on sales), but also enslaving numerous people on his various properties as well.

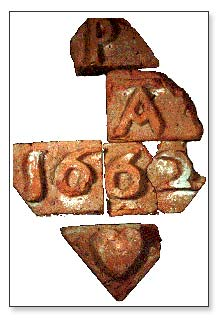
Cartouche from the John Page house, Williamsburg, showing brick initials for Page, Alice (Page's wife) and the date of the house (1662). The J was not recovered. Colonial Williamsburg

Colonel John Page and his wife Alice Lukin Page are buried at Bruton Parish Church in Williamsburg, Virginia. Their tombstone, originally located within the church graveyard, was later moved to the church vestibule. It reads: "Here lieth in hope of a joyfull resurrection the Body of Colonel JOHN PAGE of Bruton Parish, Esquire. One of their Majesties Council in the Dominion of Virginia. Who departed this life the 23 of January in the year of our Lord 1691/2 Aged 65" The tombstone carries the arms of Page impaling those of Lukin.

== Family ==
Coat of arms of Col. John Page of Middle Plantation

The Page family was one of the First Families of Virginia, which later included Mann Page III, his brother U.S. Congressman and Virginia Governor John Page, and later descendants such as U.S. Ambassador to Italy Thomas Nelson Page, and Virginian Railway builder William Nelson Page.

Colonel and Mrs. John Page named their eldest son Francis, and he also built a substantial brick home at Middle Plantation. (Present-day Francis Street in Williamsburg is said to be named for him). Another son, Matthew Page, was born in Virginia in 1659 and became a planter. He was one of the original board of trustees of the College of William and Mary, a member of the Governor's Council, and was active in public affairs. He died on January 9, 1703.

Their grandson, Mann Page I (son of Matthew Page), also became a planter and wealthy landholder in Virginia, owning nearly 70,000 acres (280 km^{2}) in Frederick County, Prince William County, and Spotsylvania County among other locations. In 1725, Mann Page I began the construction of Rosewell Plantation, the Page mansion on the banks of the York River in Gloucester County. Mann Page I's wife Judith Carter was the daughter of Robert Carter I. Mann Page I son John Page married Jane Byrd, a granddaughter of Colonel William Byrd I. One of John Page's great-grandsons was Confederate General Richard Lucian Page.

Mary Page, the daughter of Col. John Page, married Walter Chiles Jr., son of Col. Walter Chiles of the Virginia Governor's Council. In his will of March 5, 1687, Col. John Page mentions his grandson John Chiles, as well as his "grandsonne John Tyler, sonne of my grand-daughter Elizabeth Tyler." Elizabeth Chiles had married Henry Tyler of Middle Plantation, and thus became the ancestor of President John Tyler.

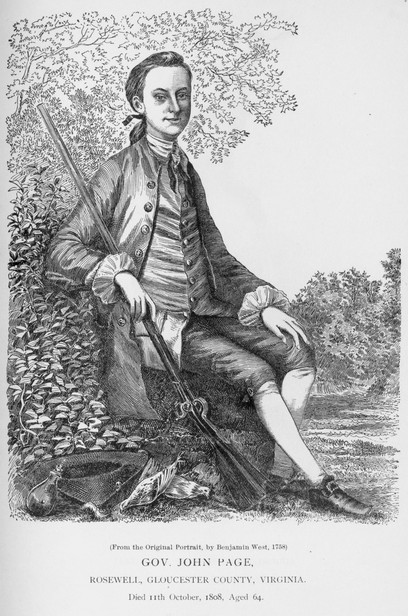
Virginia Gov. John Page, great-grandson of Col. John Page

Because of the propensity of First Families of Virginia (FFV) to marry within their narrow social ranks for many generations, John Page may be legitimately counted as a co-progenitor with many other FFV patriarchs of their genealogically documented descendants, who include descendants of the families Byrd, Chiles, Dilliard, Tyler, Pendleton, Burwell, Nelson, Randolph, Carter, Harrison, Waller and others.

== Legacy ==
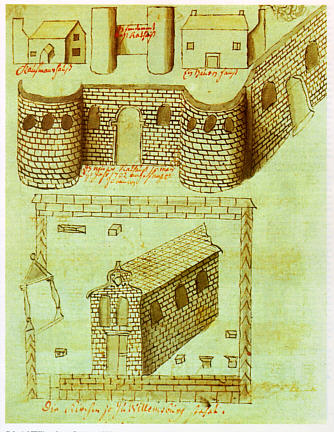
Sketch of Merchant's House, Williamsburg, likely that of John Page, 1702

Several sites of the Page family in Virginia and West Virginia have historical and archaeological significance.

- The site of their property at Jamestown has been identified by the Jamestown Rediscovery project.
- Colonial Williamsburg has an extensive archeological study underway at the John Page home site at Middle Plantation (now Williamsburg). Col. John Page owned much of what is today's Williamsburg, including Duke of Gloucester, Nicholson and part of Francis Street.
- The ruins of Rosewell plantation, the home of early members of the Page family and one of the finest mansions built in the colonies, sit on the northern bank of the York River in Gloucester County. In one of its rooms, which are all of cubic dimensions, Thomas Jefferson, a friend and the college classmate of John Page (Col. John Page's great, great grandson) is locally rumored to have drafted the U.S. Declaration of Independence. In 1916, a fire swept the mansion leaving a magnificent shell which is testament to 18th century craftsmanship and dreams, and the site ongoing archeological studies.
- The Page-Vawter House, a large Victorian mansion, was built in 1889 in Ansted, West Virginia on a knoll in the middle of town. Industrialist and mining manager William and Emma (née Gilham) Page raised their four children there, attended by a staff of 8 servants. In the 21st century, it still stands as evidence of the once-thriving coal business and was listed on the National Register of Historic Places in 1985.

== See also ==
- John Page
- Mann Page
- Rosewell plantation

== Sources ==
- Virtual American Biographies
- Colonial Williamsburg
- USGenealogy.net
