= John Wollaston (painter) =

English painter

John Wollaston (fl. 1742 – 1775) was an English painter who specialised in portrait painting and was active mostly in British North America. He was one of a handful of painters to introduce English Rococo styles of painting to Britain's North American colonies.

== Biography ==
Little is known of Wollaston's early life. He is believed to have been the son of a painter, born in London. Some sources give his father's name as John Wollaston; others, citing Horace Walpole's Anecdotes of Painting in England of 1765, suggest that his father's name was John Woolston, and that he later changed his name to Wollaston.

Similarly, little is known about his artistic training; Charles Willson Peale, in a letter dated 1812 and written to his son Rembrandt, mentions that Wollaston trained in London with a drapery painter, but nothing else has been recorded.

Stylistically, Wollaston's work bears some similarity to portraits by Thomas Hudson and Allan Ramsey, among others, and it has been suggested that his teacher was Joseph van Aken, who completed the drapery in paintings by these and other artists of the period. That Wollaston considered himself English rather than American may be seen by the label on the back of a portrait of William Smith, Jr. painted in 1751; the label describes the artist as "Johnannes Wollaston Londoniensis".

Wollaston's first securely documented work, executed in 1742, is a portrait of Methodist evangelist George Whitefield; the original still exists, in the collections of the National Portrait Gallery in London. An engraving was produced after it by John Faber the Younger. A handful of other paintings dating to before his trip to the colonies also exist, including a portrait of an unidentified officer of the Royal Navy now in the National Gallery of Art.

Wollaston crossed the Atlantic in 1749, settling for a time in New York City; there he introduced the latest and most fashionable of London styles in portraiture to American patrons. In 1752, he journeyed south, spending a short time in Philadelphia before arriving in Annapolis by the spring of 1753. During the following year or so he completed some sixty portraits of Marylanders. He next moved to Virginia, producing a comparable amount of portraits of locals between 1755 and 1757. Throughout he continued using the compositions and portrait types he had learned in London; although somewhat outmoded by this time, they remained impressive. By the fall of 1758 Wollaston was back in Philadelphia; he was last recorded there in May 1759. It seems likely that he visited the West Indies before arriving in Charleston in September 1765. Charleston was his last stop in America; he painted at least seventeen portraits there before returning to London in May 1767. Here he disappears from the historical record; the only further mention of his name comes in 1775, when he was encountered in England by chance by an acquaintance from the Leeward Islands.

== Style ==
Wollaston's artistic style changed little in the eighteen years he spent in the American colonies. His portraits feature rich depictions of fabrics and elegant poses, and his subjects are smiling and oval-eyed; many of his poses seem to be drawn from engravings. Some of his later New York portraits feature a landscape background; most focus on careful depiction of the sitters' apparel, which serves as a conspicuous symbol of their class. His treatment of the subjects' eyes in particular is considered somewhat peculiar, and serves to identify even his unsigned portraits. His later works, especially those painted during his Charleston sojourn, depict figures on a smaller scale than the 50x40 format preferred by his Maryland and Virginia patrons. Wollaston has been described as "competent but not very inventive" by some modern critics.

== Influence ==
Wollaston travelled more widely in the American colonies than any other painter, and served to satisfy a growing demand for formal portraiture for merchants and landowners. That his work was widely respected in his day can be seen from laudatory poetry published in the Maryland Gazette in 1753 and in a 1758 edition of The American Magazine and Monthly Chronicle for the British Colonies. The former was penned by a "Dr. T. T." and reads in part:

BEHOLD the wond’rous Power of Art!
That mocks devouring Time and Death,
Can Nature’s ev’ry Charm impart;
And make the lifeless Canvas breathe.

Wollaston's influence on younger artists was felt primarily in Philadelphia; there, painters such as Robert Feke, John Hesselius, and Benjamin West imitated his technique and compositions in their own output. It also seems likely that Jeremiah Theus became acquainted with Wollaston's work during the latter's time in Charleston, and adopted some of the older artist's techniques in his own later paintings.

Today, Wollaston's portraits can be found in many museum collections; among these are those of the National Gallery of Art; the Detroit Institute of Arts, the Museum of Fine Arts, Boston; and the Brooklyn Museum of Art.

== Gallery ==
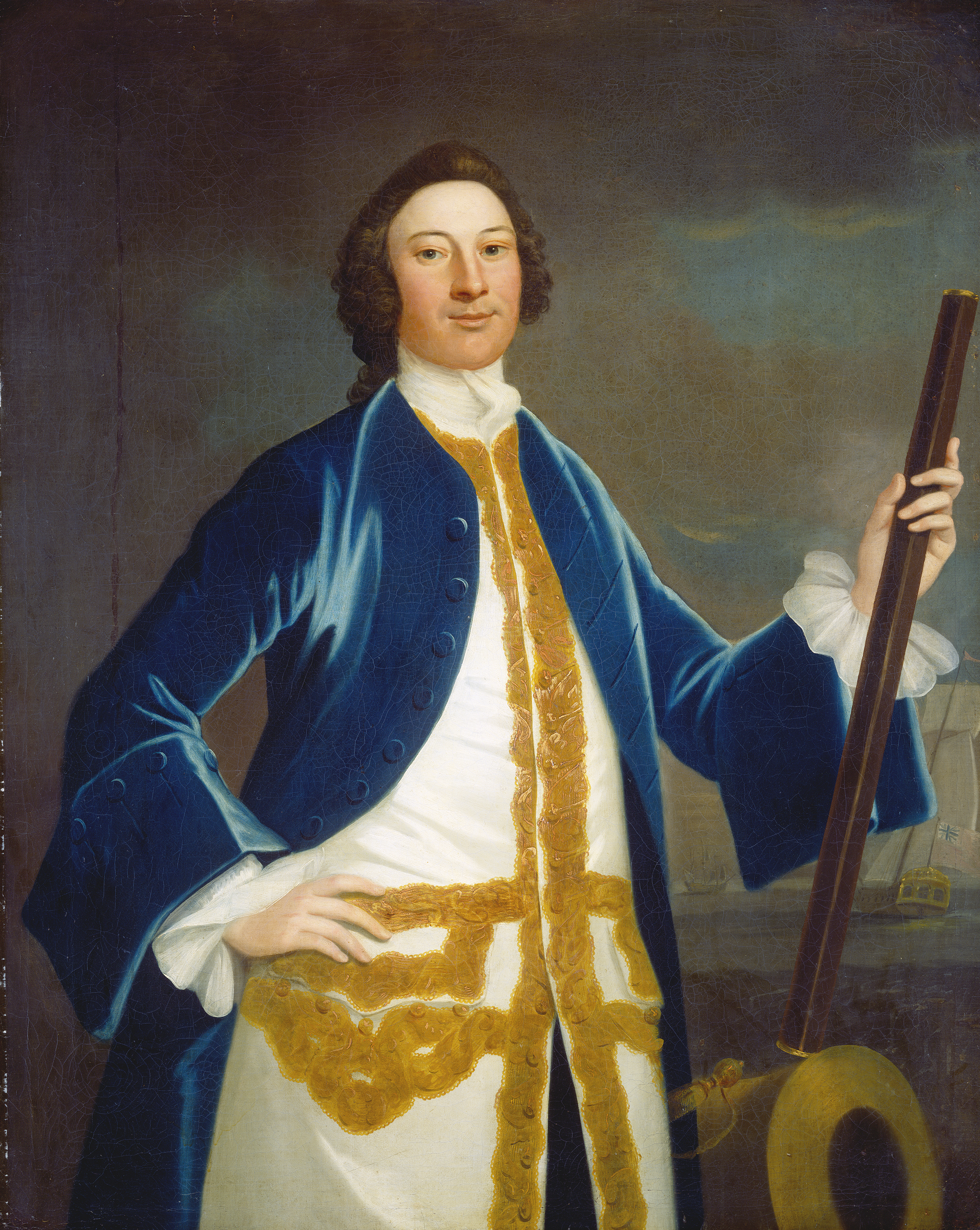
Unidentified British Navy Officer (c. 1745)

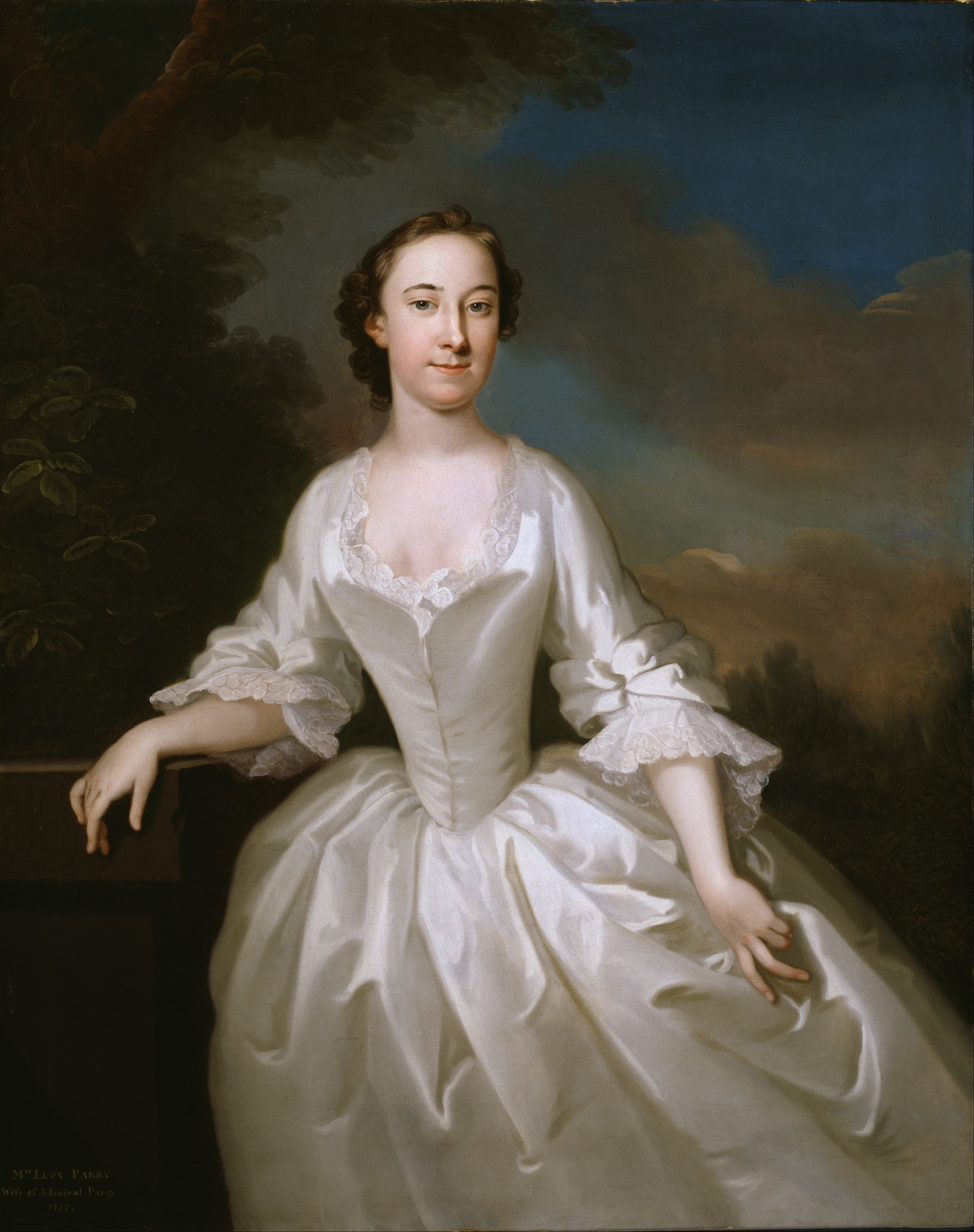
Portrait of Lucy Parry, Wife of Admiral Parry (1745–1749)

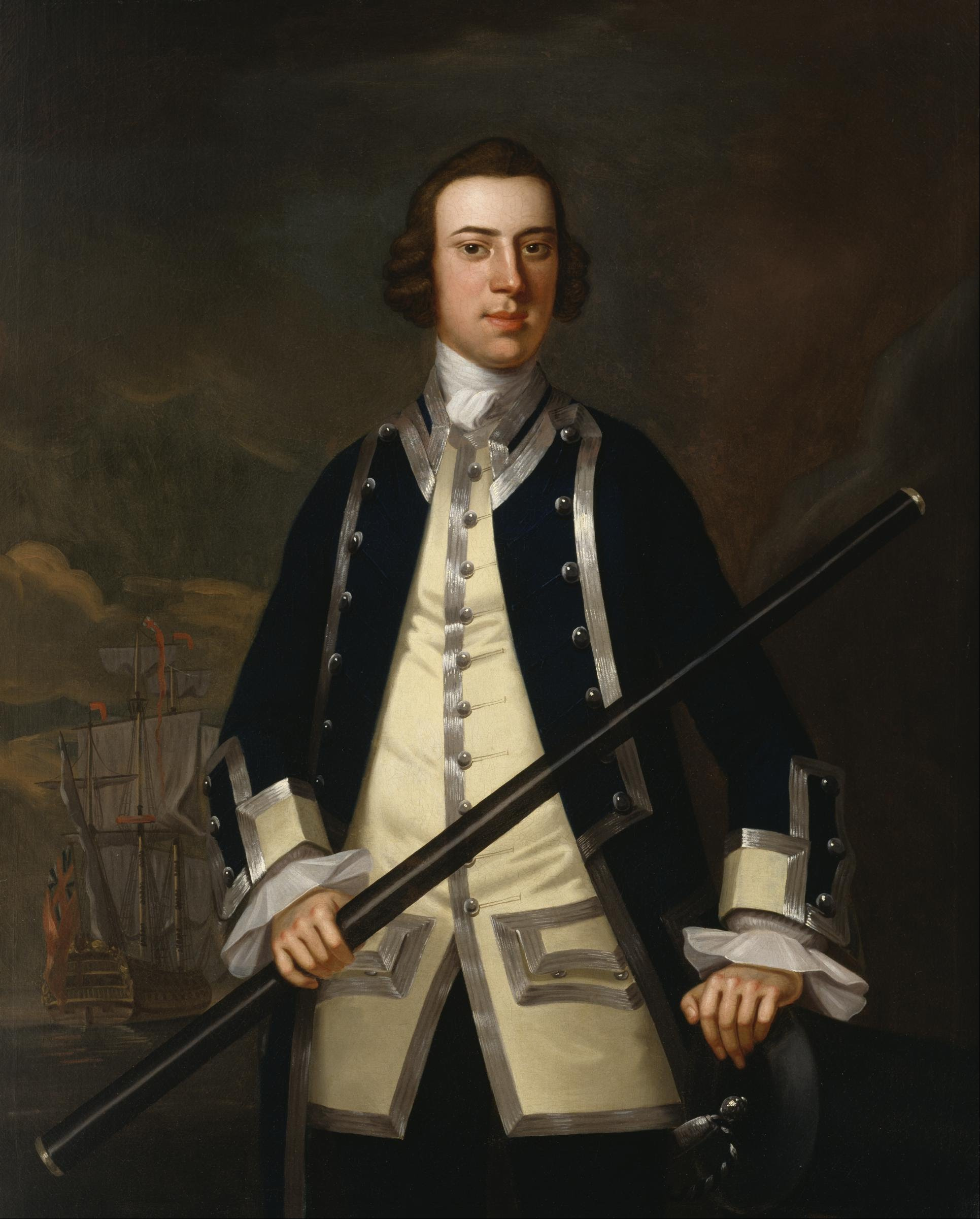
Portrait of a Naval Officer, Known as Augustus Keppel (1748–1751)

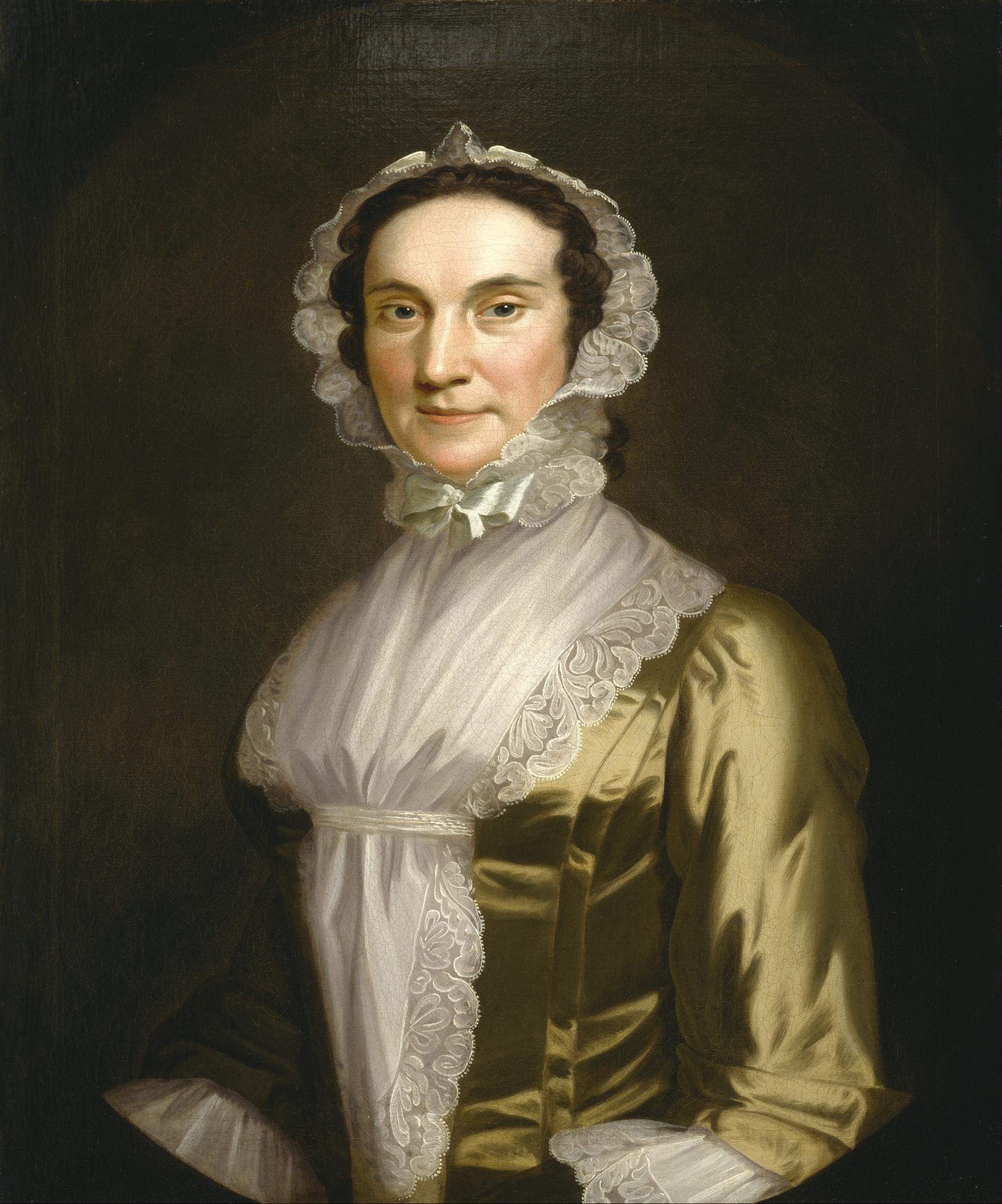
Portrait of Mrs. Richard Nichols (1749)

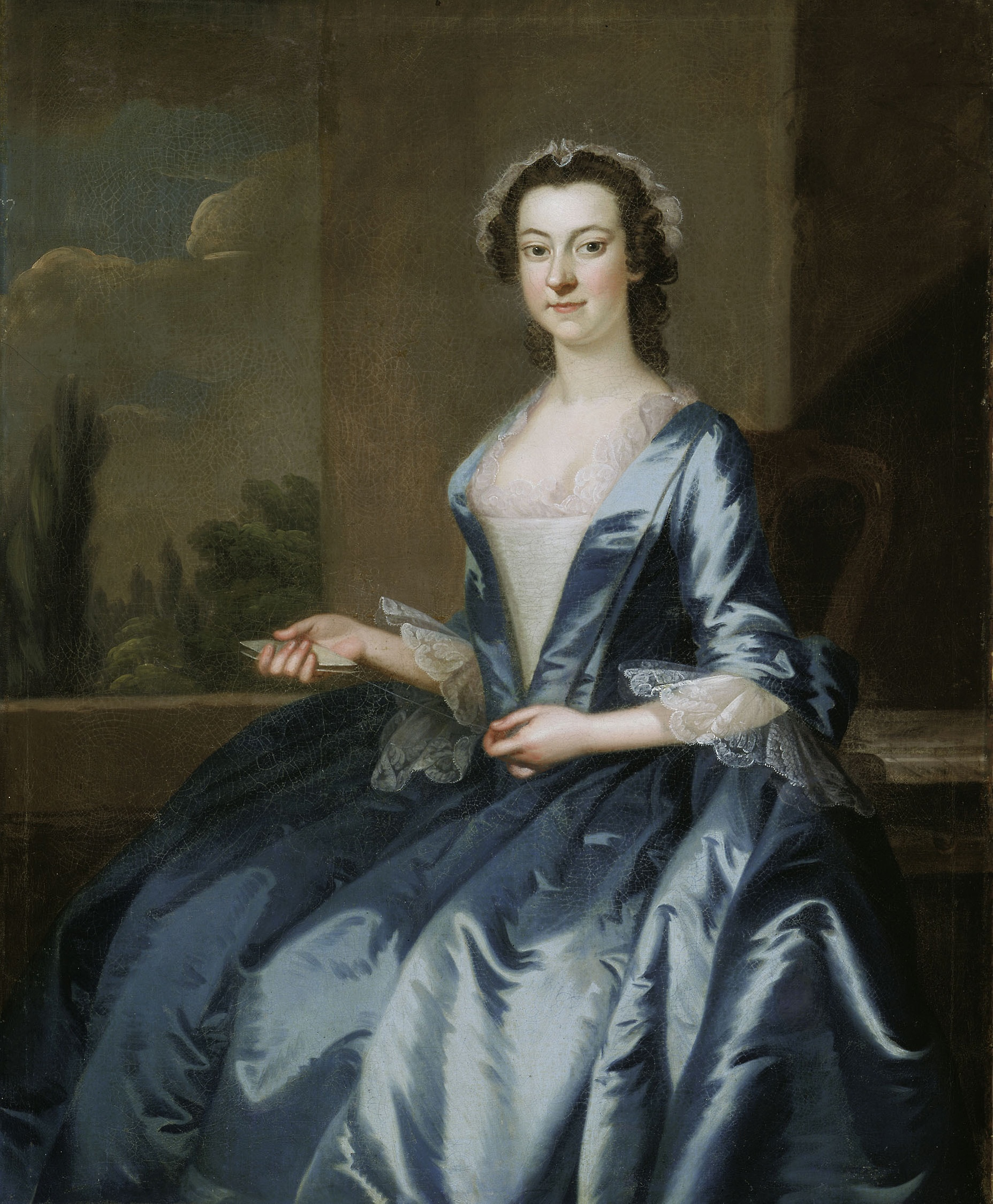
Portrait of a Woman (1749–1752)

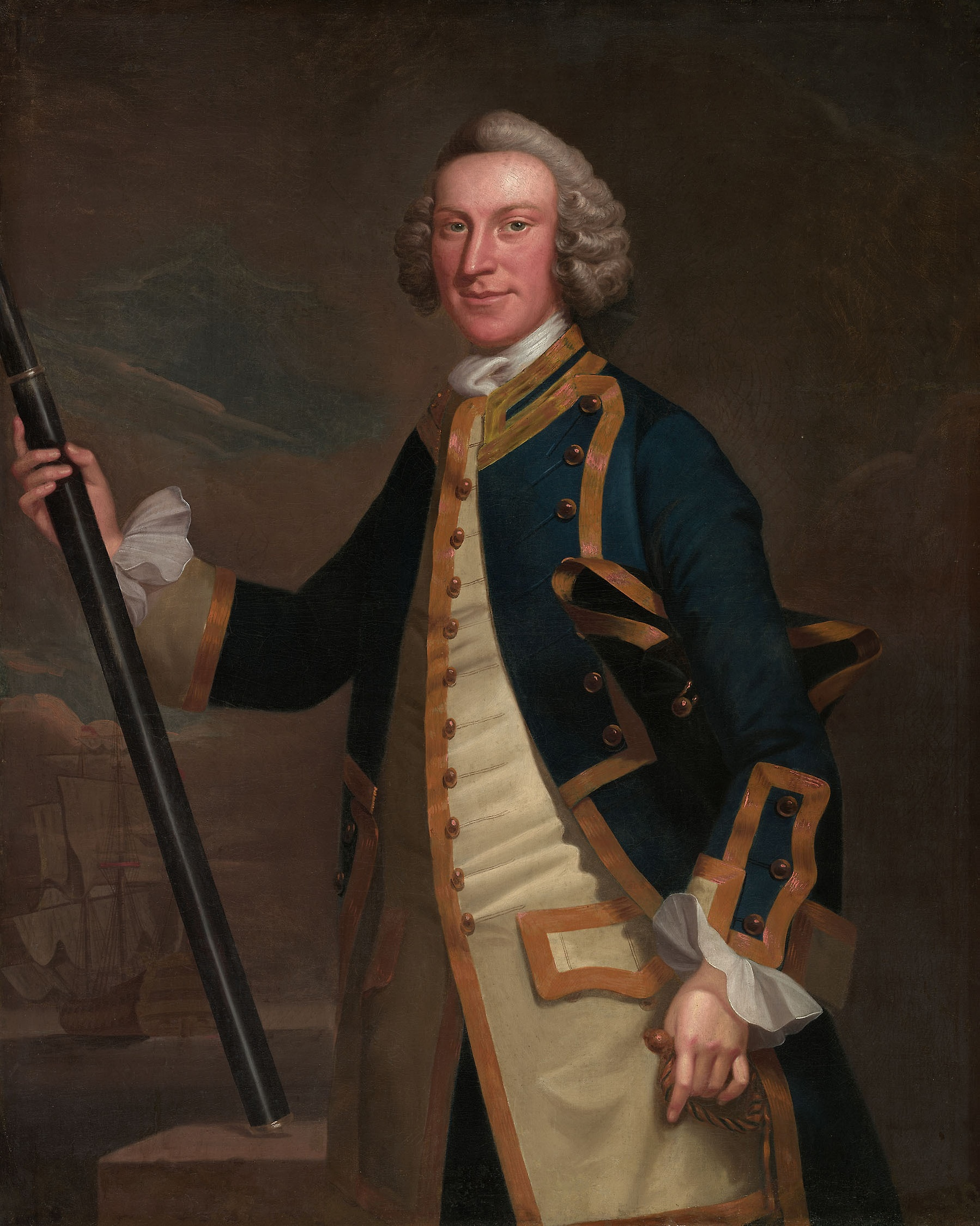
Portrait of a Naval Officer (1749–1758)

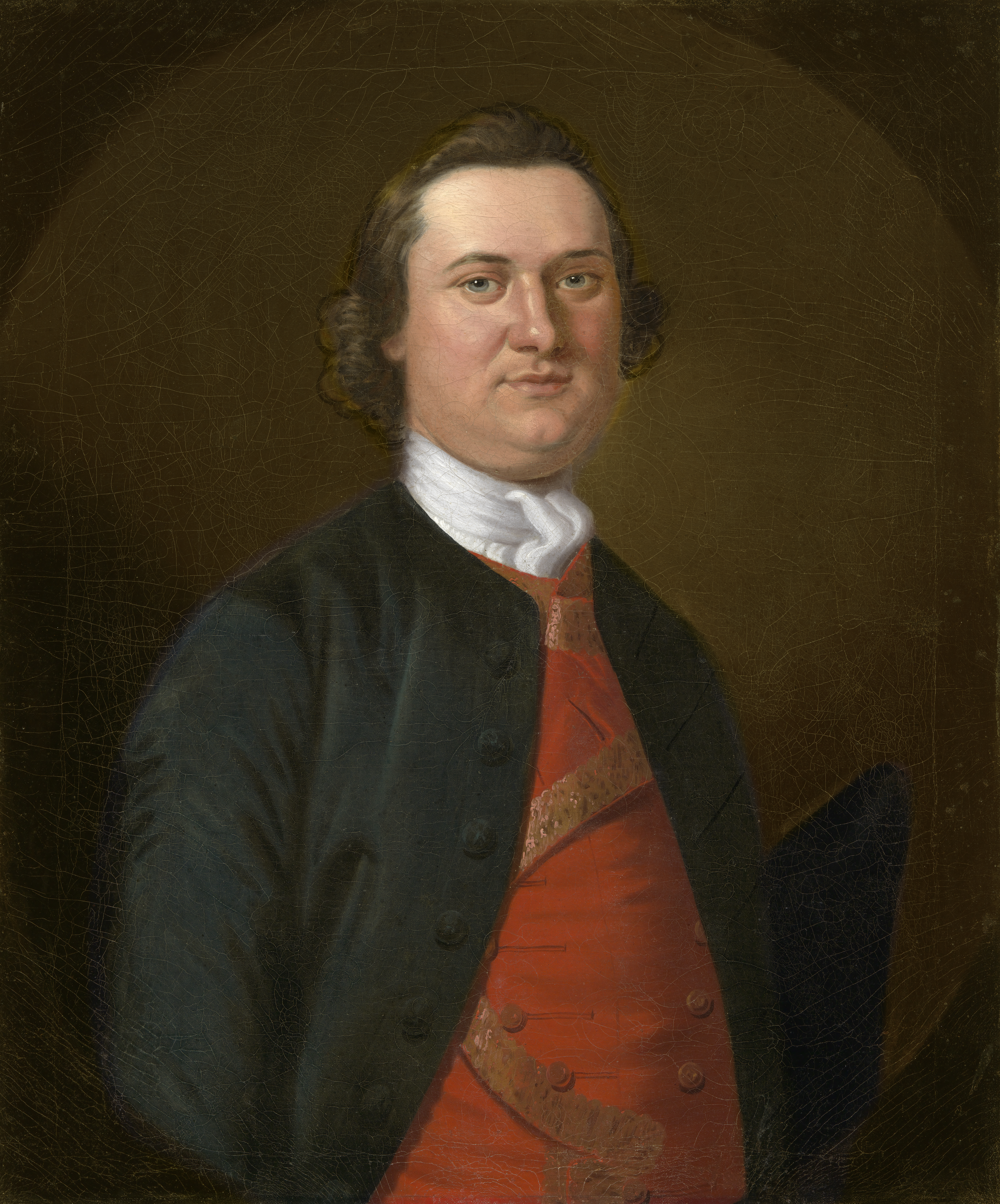
Lewis Morris (c. 1750)

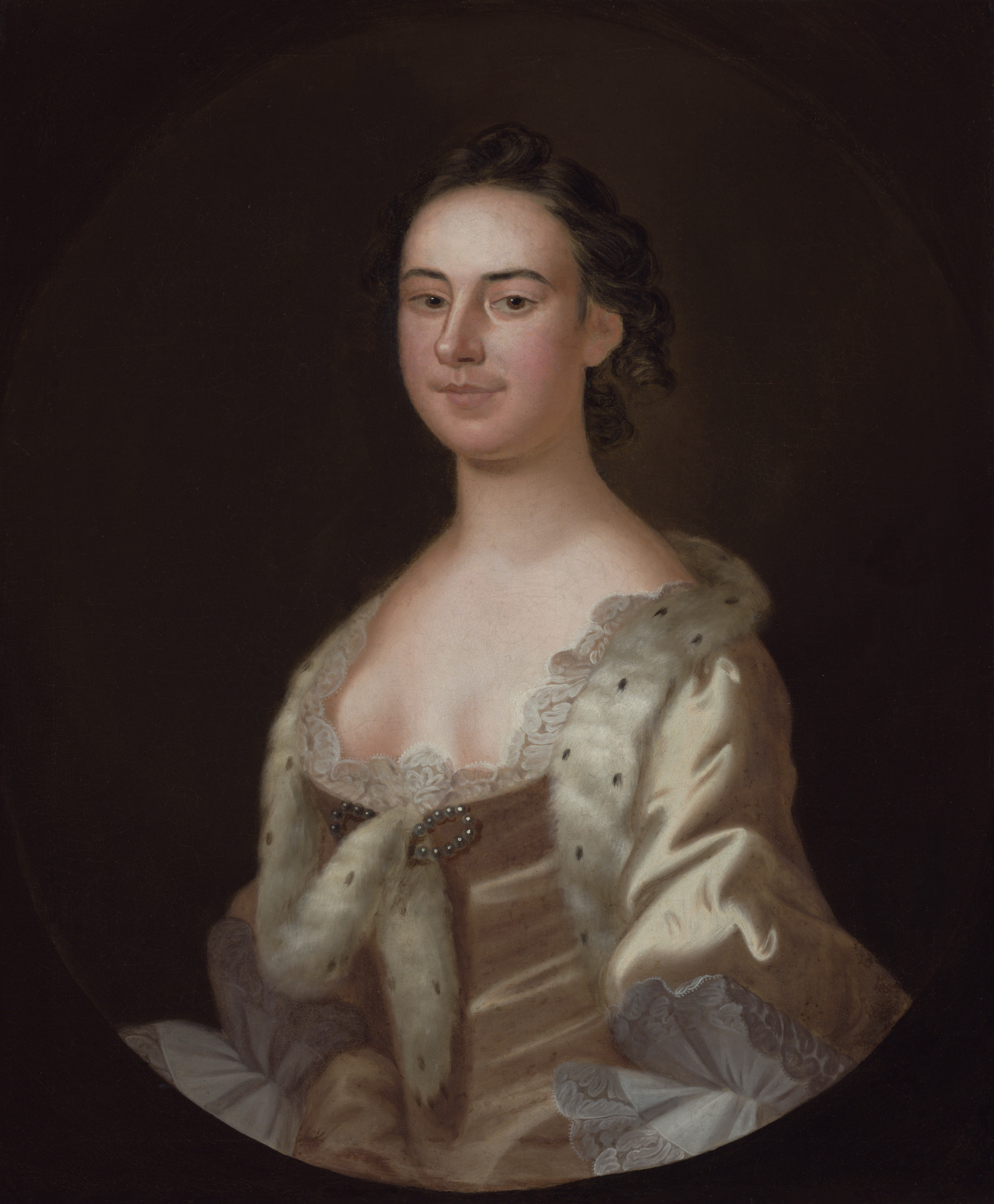
Elizabeth Calvert (1754)

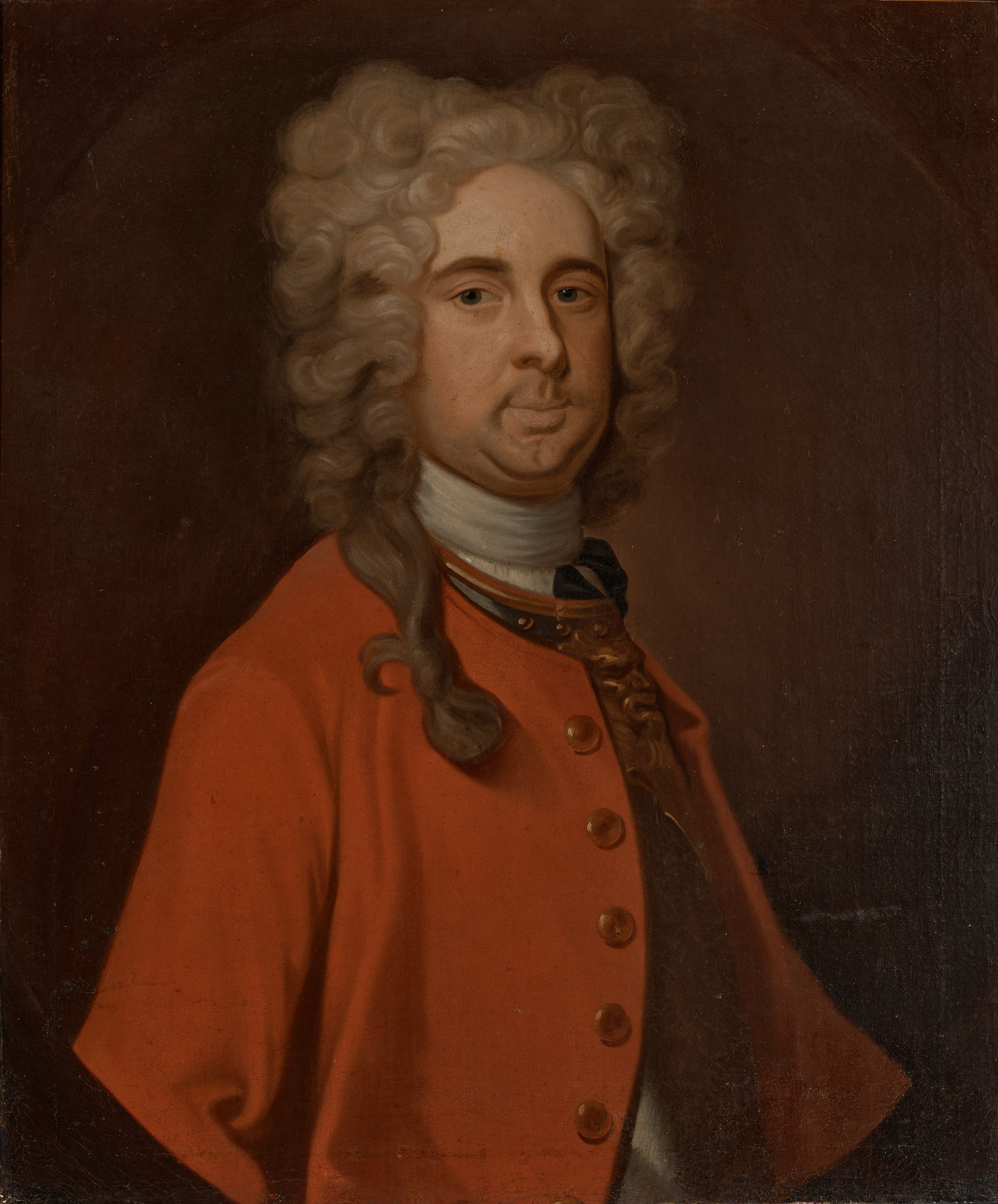
Captain Charles Calvert (1754)

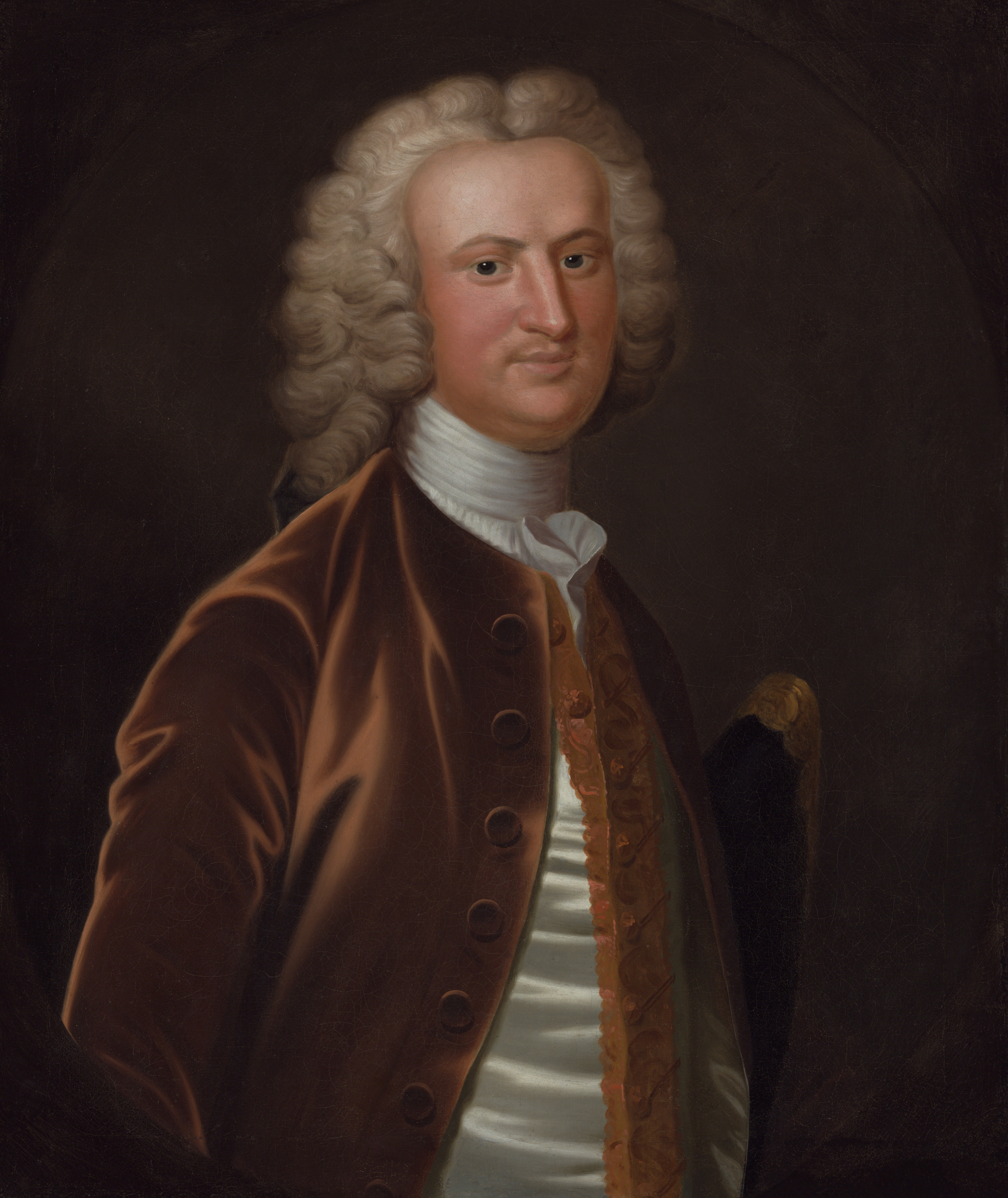
Benedict Calvert (1754)

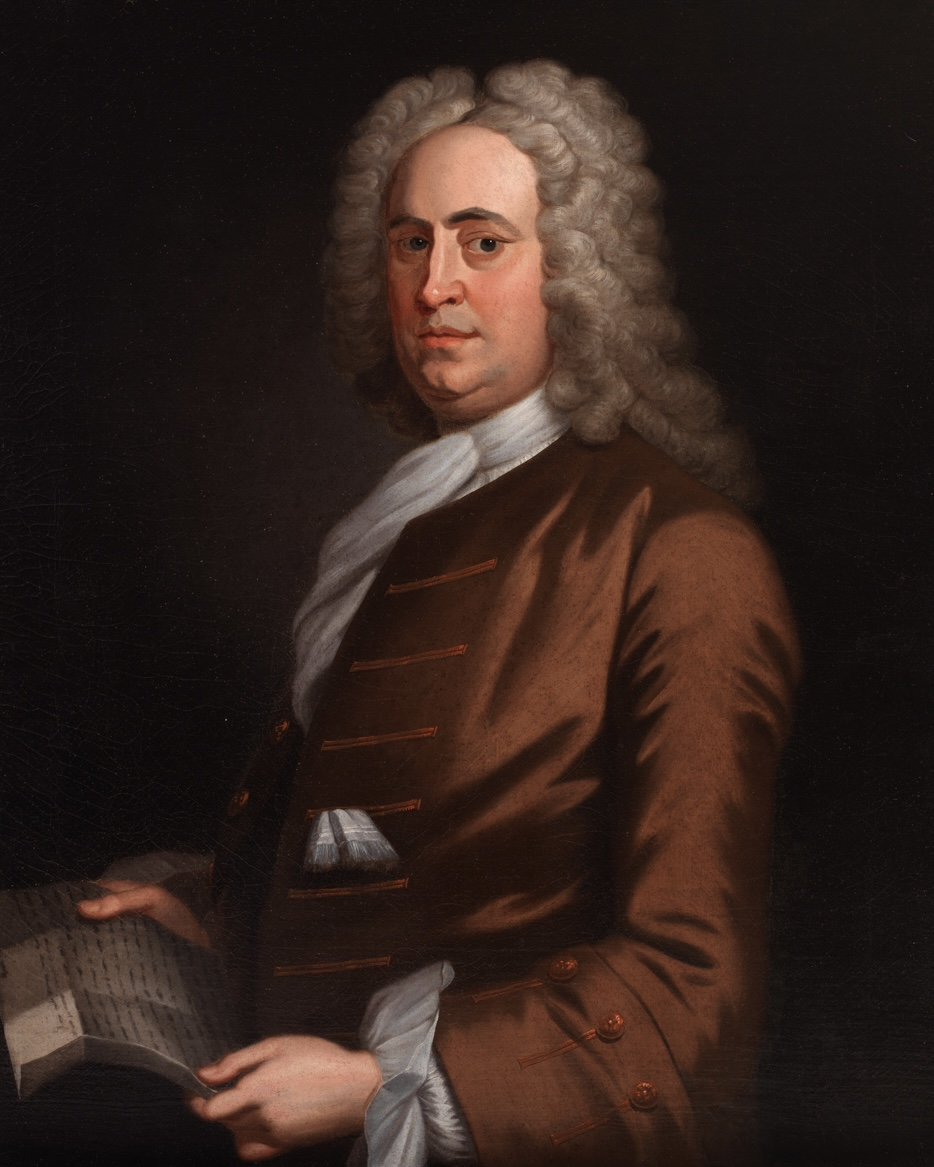
William Randolph II (c. 1755)

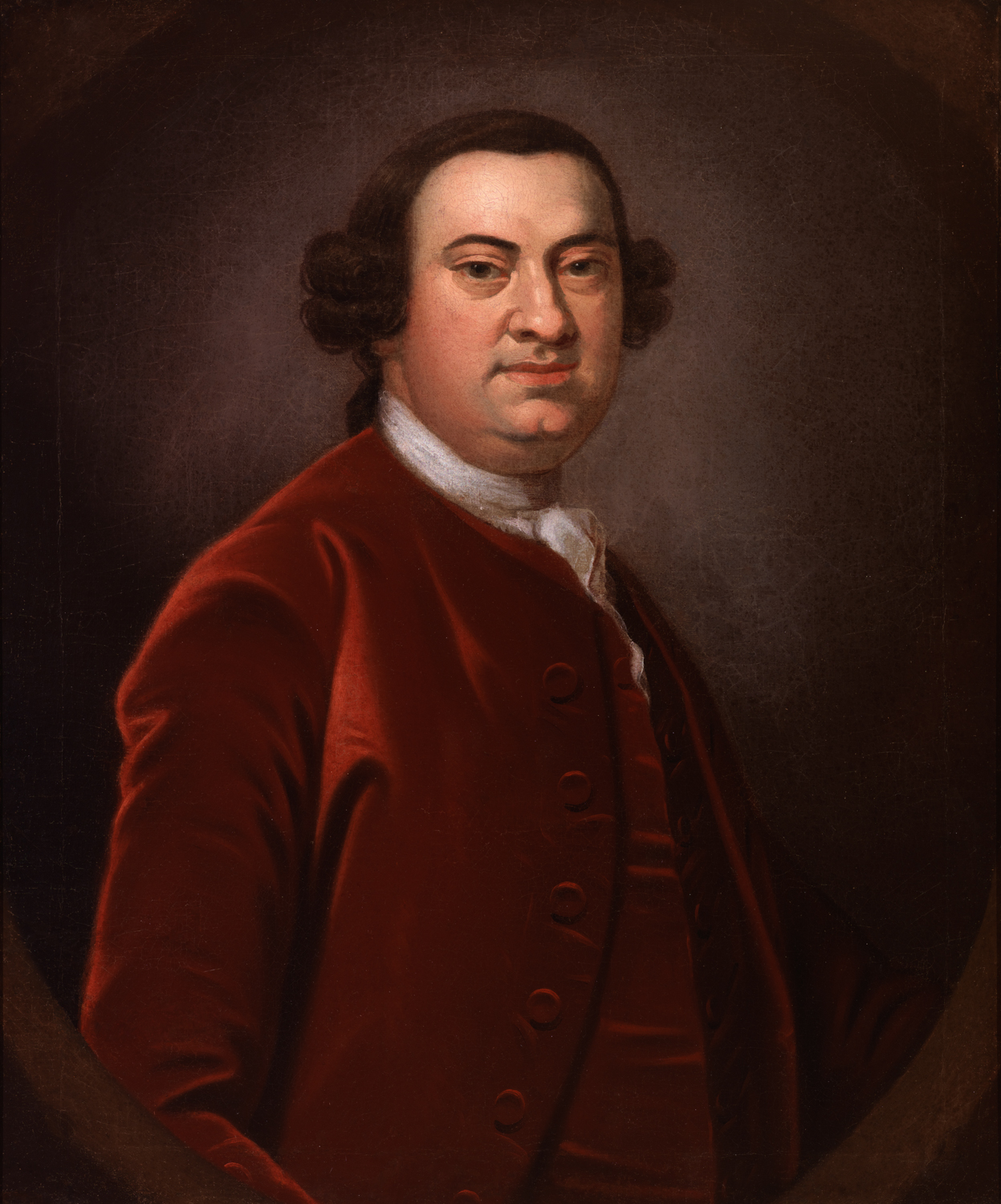
Mann Page II (c. 1755)

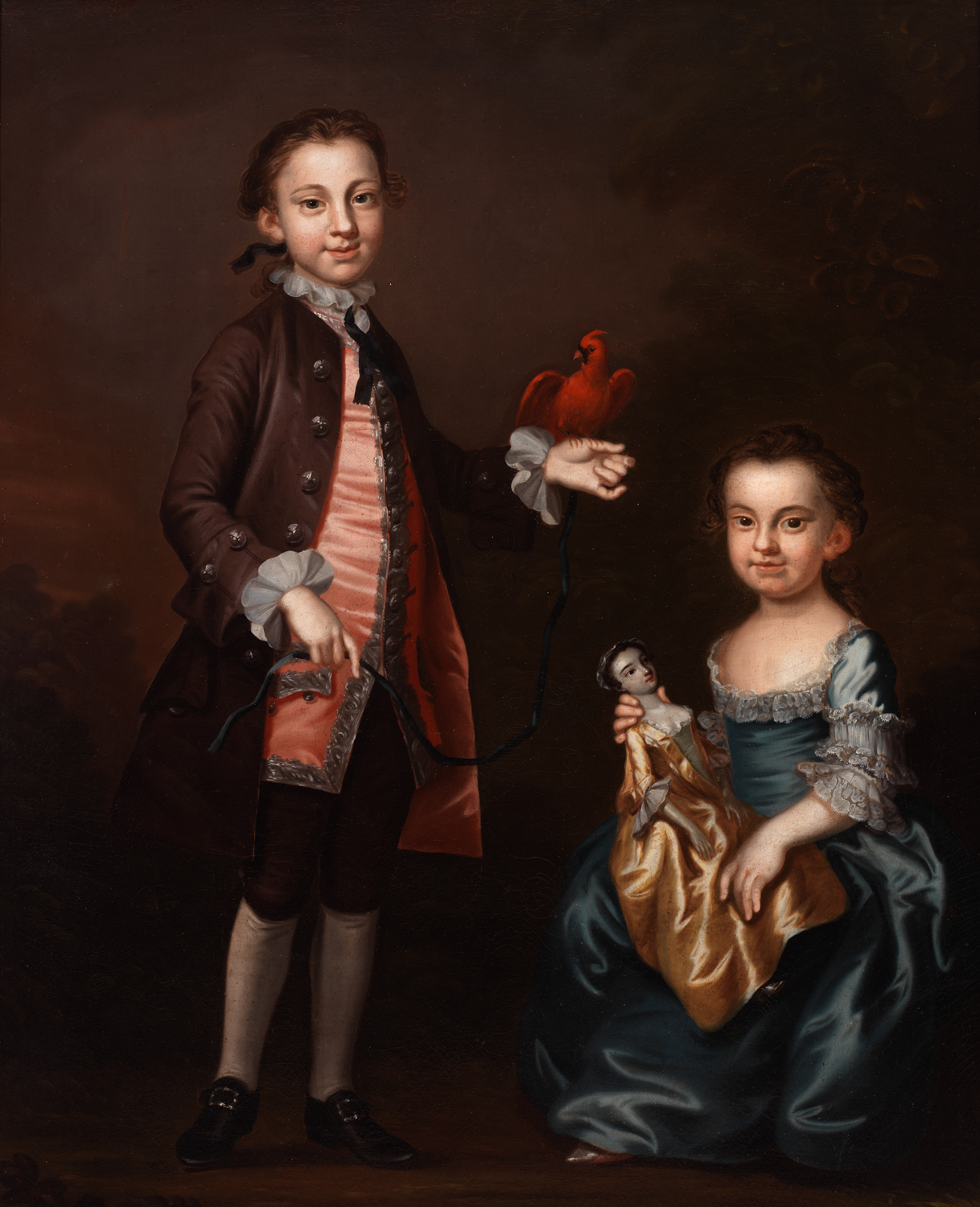
Mann Page and His Sister Elizabeth (c. 1755–1758)

Ralph Wormeley (c. 1755–1758)

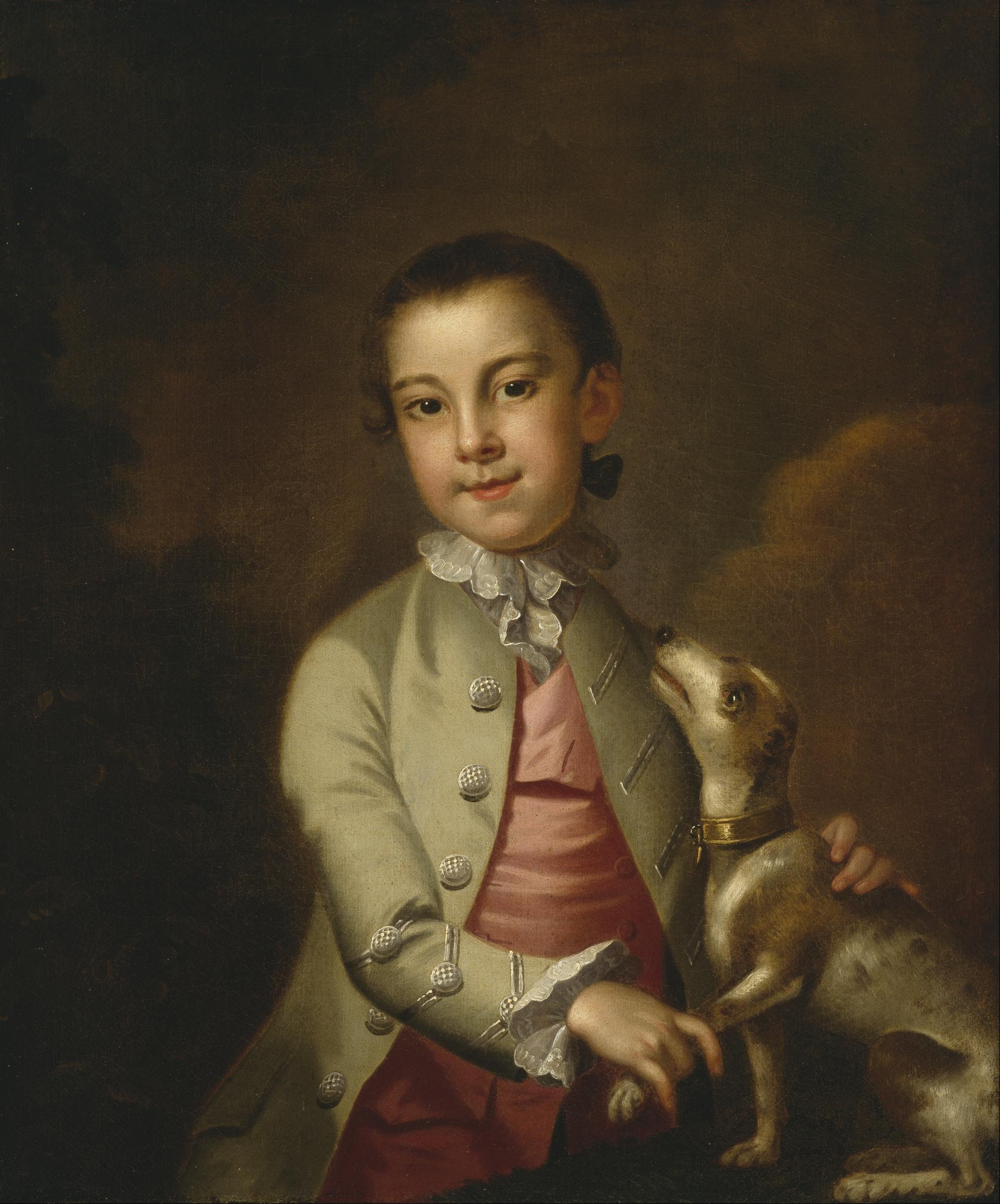
Portrait of William Holmes (1763–1769)
