= John Stratton (Virginia politician) =

American politician

John Stratton (August 19, 1769 – May 10, 1804) was an eighteenth and nineteenth century congressman and lawyer from Virginia, USA.

Born at "Old Castle" near Eastville, Virginia, Stratton attended the common schools as a child. He studied law and was admitted to the bar. He was a member of the Virginia House of Delegates from 1789 to 1792 and was later elected as a Federalist to the United States House of Representatives in 1800, serving from 1801 to 1803. He died in Norfolk, Virginia, on May 10, 1804, and was interred there in Saint Paul's Episcopal Churchyard.

U.S. House of Representatives
Preceded by Thomas Evans	Member of the U.S. House of Representatives from Virginia's 12th congressional district March 4, 1801 – March 3, 1803 (obsolete district)	Succeeded by Thomas Griffin
