= Pindall =

Pindall may refer to:

- James Pindall (c. 1783–1825), American politician
- Pindall, Arkansas, a town in Searcy County, Arkansas
- Xenophon Jacob Pindall, lawyer, state legislator and judge in Arkansas
- Xenophon Overton Pindall, Governor of Arkansas, 1907–1909
