= Senator Pindall =

Senator Pindall may refer to:

- James Pindall (1783–1825), Virginia State Senate
- Xenophon Overton Pindall (1873–1935), Arkansas State Senate
