= 1908 Arkansas gubernatorial election =

- September 14, 1908
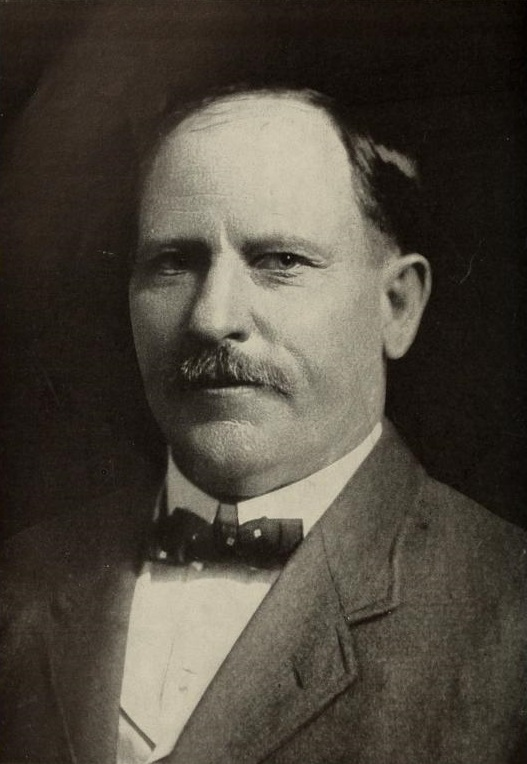

Nominee	George Washington Donaghey	John I. Worthington
Party	Democratic	Republican
Popular vote	110,418	44,863
Percentage	68.08%	27.66%
- County results Donaghey: 40–50% 50–60% 60–70% 70–80% 80–90% 90–100% Worthington: 60–70%
Governor before election
Jesse M. Martin (Acting)
Democratic
Elected Governor
George Washington Donaghey
Democratic

The 1908 Arkansas gubernatorial election was held on September 14, 1908, in order to elect the Governor of Arkansas. Democratic nominee George Washington Donaghey defeated Republican nominee John I. Worthington.

== General election ==
On election day, September 14, 1908, Democratic nominee George Washington Donaghey won the election by a margin of 65,555 votes against his foremost opponent Republican nominee John I. Worthington, thereby retaining Democratic control over the office of Governor. Donaghey was sworn in as the 22nd Governor of Arkansas on January 14, 1909.

=== Results ===
1908 Arkansas gubernatorial election
Party	Candidate	Votes	%
Democratic	George Washington Donaghey	110,418	68.08
Republican	John I. Worthington	44,863	27.66
Socialist	J. Samuel Jones	6,787	4.18
	Scattering	129	0.08
Total votes		162,197	100.00
Democratic hold			
