= Governor Martin =

Governor Martin may refer to:

- Alexander Martin (1740–1807), 4th & 7th Governor of North Carolina
- Charles Martin (Oregon politician) (1863–1946), 21st Governor of Oregon
- Clarence D. Martin (1886–1955), 11th Governor of Washington
- Daniel Martin (politician) (1780–1831), 20th Governor of Maryland
- Edward Martin (Pennsylvania politician) (1879–1967), 32nd Governor of Pennsylvania
- François Martin (Pondicherry) (1634–1706), 1st Governor General of Pondicherry
- James G. Martin (born 1935), 70th Governor of North Carolina
- Jesse M. Martin (1877–1915), Acting Governor of Arkansas in 1909
- John Martin (Governor of Georgia) (died 1786), 12th Governor of Georgia
- John Martin (Governor of Kansas) (1839–1889), 10th Governor of Kansas
- John W. Martin (1884–1958), 24th Governor of Florida
- Joshua L. Martin (1799–1856), 12th Governor of Alabama
- Josiah Martin (1737–1786), 9th British Governor of the province of North Carolina from 1771 to 1776
- Noah Martin (politician) (1801–1863), 23rd Governor of New Hampshire
- Robert Martin (Oklahoma governor) (1833–1897), Acting Governor of Oklahoma Territory from 1891 to 1892

== See also ==
- Manuel António Martins (1772–1845), Colonial Governor of Cape Verde and Portuguese Guinea from 1834 to 1835
