= Beverly B. Douglas =

American politician (1822–1878)

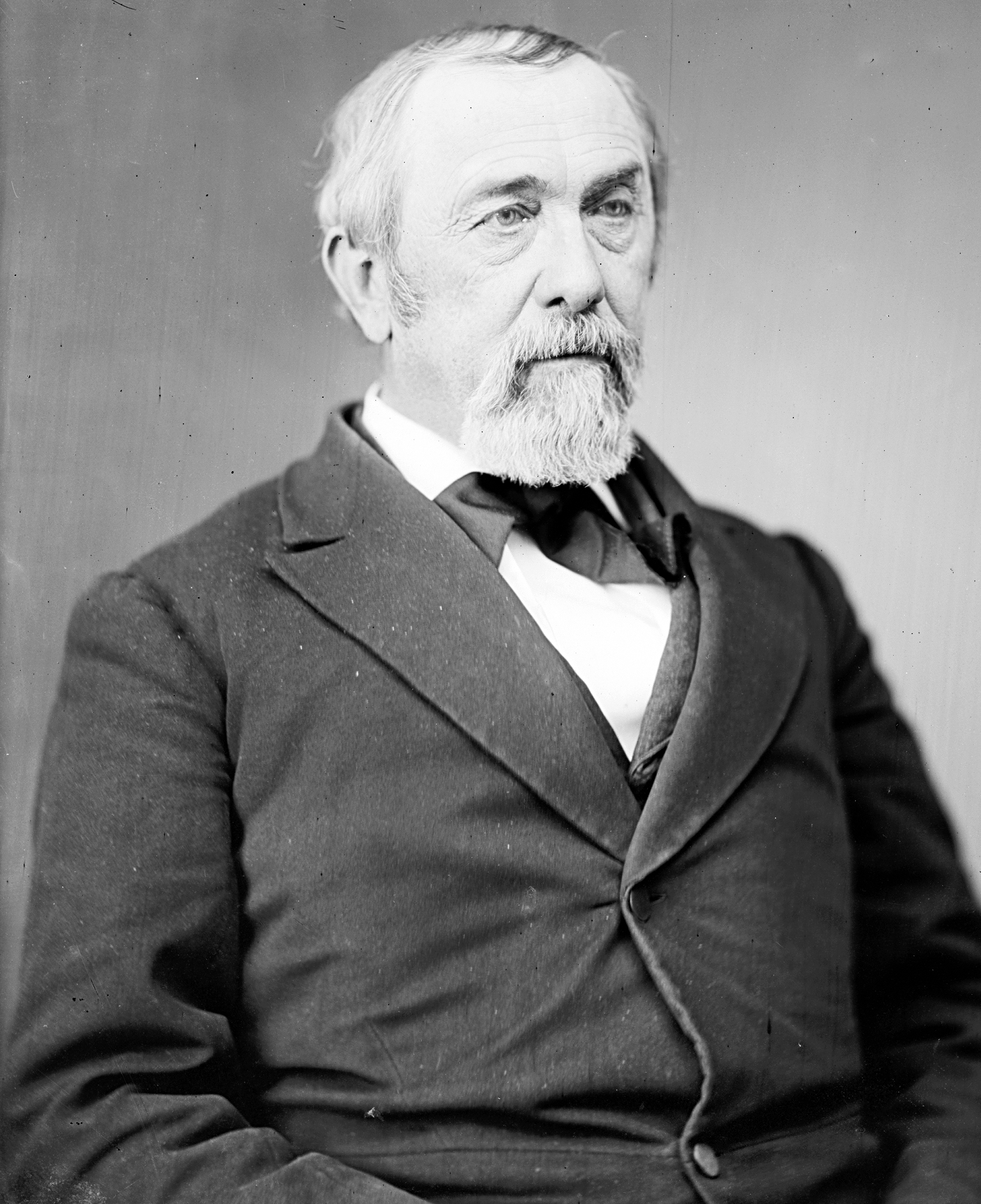

Member of the U.S. House of Representatives from Virginia's 1st district
- In office March 4, 1875 – December 22, 1878
- Preceded by: James B. Sener
- Succeeded by: Richard L. T. Beale

Member of the Virginia Senate from King William, King and Queen and Essex Counties
- In office 1852–1865
- Preceded by: District created
- Succeeded by: District abolished

Personal details
- Born: Beverly Browne Douglas; December 21, 1822 Providence Forge, Virginia
- Died: December 22, 1878 (aged 56) Washington, D.C.
- Resting place: Zoar, Aylett, Virginia
- Party: Democratic
- Spouse: Elizabeth
- Children: at least 3 daughters
- Education: College of William and Mary; Yale College; University of Edinburgh
- Occupation: Attorney, planter

Military service
- Allegiance: Confederate States
- Branch/service: Confederate States Army
- Rank: Major
- Unit: 5th Virginia Cavalry; 9th Virginia Cavalry
- Battles/wars: American Civil War

Beverly Browne Douglas (December 21, 1822 – December 22, 1878) was a Democrat who served two terms as U.S. representative from Virginia from 1875 to 1878. He also served as in the Virginia Senate representing King William, King and Queen and Essex Counties (1852-1865) and as a Confederate cavalry officer during the American Civil War.

== Early life ==
Born at Providence Forge in New Kent County, Virginia, to Elizabeth, the wife of planter William Douglas. Young Beverley Douglas attended Rumford Academy across the river in King William County. In his college years, he attended the College of William and Mary in Williamsburg, Virginia, as well as Yale College, and the University of Edinburgh, Scotland. At some point he studied law at a school operated by Judge Beverly Tucker. Upon returning to the United States, Douglas reentered William and Mary, and graduated from the law department in 1843.

== Career ==
=== Lawyer and planter ===
Admitted to the bar in 1844, Douglas began his legal practice in his native New Kent County, as well as Norfolk, Virginia. By 1846 he had moved his legal practice to King William County, Virginia.

Douglas owned 20 slaves in King William County in 1850, and 33 slaves in 1860.

=== Virginia politician ===
In 1850 Douglas began his political career by winning an election to become one of five delegates to the Virginia Constitutional Convention of 1850. Together with Francis W. Scott, Corbin Braxton, Eustace Conway and Edward W. Morris, he represented Caroline, Spotsylvania, King William and Hanover counties. That Convention drafted a new state constitution which increased representation of increasingly populated western Virginia counties in part by redrawing districts in Tidewater Virginia. Thus, while King William and King and Queen counties had been jointly represented in the Virginia Senate by John W. C. Catlett together with three counties mostly to the east (Gloucester, Mathews and Middlesex counties) in the 1850-1851 legislative session, those two counties were now combined with Essex county to the west (Essex had previously been combined with Spotsylvania and Caroline counties in a state senatorial district represented by Austin M. Trible).

Following the convention, Douglas won election from the new senatorial district, and continued to win re-election to the Senate of Virginia during the period 1852–1865. Douglas for five years served as chairman of the powerful finance committee, and also served as presidential elector for the Democratic ticket of Breckinridge and Lane in 1860.

=== Civil War officer ===
As the Civil War began, Douglas continued to serve as state senator, and even chaired the committee on military affairs, but also volunteered to join the Confederate States Army. He initially accepted a commission as a first lieutenant in Lee's Rangers, a cavalry company drawn from King William County and which for the first months of the conflict was attached to infantry regiments and performed picket duty as well as provided couriers to field officers in northern Virginia. At some point Douglas was elected captain. In December 1861 that unit became Company H of the 9th Virginia Cavalry, but that regiment was not geographically united until April 1862, when Federal forces pushed toward Fredericksburg and W.H.F. Lee was made colonel. During early June 1862, the regiment drilled regularly under Col. Lee, but did not participate in the Battle of Seven Pines. However, six of its companies participated on June 12–15 in General J.E.B. Stuart's famous ride around McClellan's Army.

On June 24, 1862, the day before General Richard E. Lee (Col. Lee's father) began complex maneuvers which launched his Seven Days offensive, Douglas was promoted to the rank of major, but transferred to the newly reorganized 5th Virginia Cavalry. That regiment had been composed of companies drawn from southern Tidewater counties and had protected coastal areas south of the James River (including North Carolina). However, on April 18, Federal troops had landed at Elizabeth City, so during the next month those companies guarded Williamsburg and Yorktown before a complete reorganization at the end of May. Captain Henry Clay Pate of the Petersburg Rangers (a/k/a Letcher Mounted Guards, who had gained fame as a slavery advocate in Kansas and fought in western Virginia in the war's early months), had envisioned a cavalry unit of men from every Virginia county to protect the Confederate capital, Richmond. On May 25, 1862 Pate organized the 2nd Battalion Virginia Cavalry, which on June 23 General J.E.B. Stuart reorganized as the 5th Virginia Cavalry following the dismemberment of the previous unit. Pate became the regiment's Lieutenant Colonel under Col. Thomas L. Rosser, and Douglas became Major in the unit, with Pate's brother Otho K. Pate as adjutant. As part of Stuarts's cavalry, the unit saw considerable action in northern Virginia from Manassas in Prince William County to Fairfax, Loudoun and Hampshire Counties (in what became West Virginia) and even into Maryland that summer. Douglas briefly took command at Piedmont on November 3, as Stuart's cavalry resisted the Federal advance into northern Virginia and Col. Williams C. Wickham of the 4th regiment was wounded in the action. However, Douglas resigned on January 8, 1863 to return to the Virginia legislature.

== Postwar legislator ==
Following the conflict, Douglas' Confederate service limited his political activity, and Virginia could not be readmitted to the union without discarding its 1850 Constitution, which explicitly allowed slavery. Upon reorganizing the Virginia legislature, Mathews, Gloucester and Middlesex Counties were combined with King and Queen, King William and Essex counties in a senatorial district whose voters elected Warner T. Taliaferro of Gloucester County. Then after adoption of the Virginia Constitution of 1869, King William was combined with Caroline and Essex Counties and that district's voters elected Edmund W. Massey, who had represented them at the latest constitutional convention. However, Douglas's political career had not ended. In 1868 he was a delegate to the Democratic convention which nominated Seymour and Blair, who lost to the Republican presidential ticket in the general election.

In 1874 voters elected Douglas as a Democrat to the Forty-fourth Congress and would re-elect him to the Forty-fifth Congress. He defeated the incumbent Republican, James Beverley Sener of Fredericksburg, despite Sener's having sponsored legislation to create the Steamboat Inspection Service (although Sener would later become Chief Justice of the Wyoming Territory). Douglas served from March 4, 1875, until his death in Washington, D.C. on December 22, 1878. However, he did not hold congressional positions of importance, his most important post being as chairman of the committee investigatigating the demise of the Freedman's Savings Bank.

== Personal life ==
Douglas outlived his wife, the former Eliza Dandridge Pollard (1822-1867), daughter of Robert Pollard (d. 1856), who served for more than 40 years as court clerk of King William County. Her grandfather, also Robert Pollard, had purchased over 1000 acres in 1782, and named his plantation home after the biblical village, perhaps because it overlooked the town of Aylett, Virginia which some likened to Sodom and Gomorrah for its horseracing and many taverns. Upon the elder Pollard's death in 1821, the plantation was divided among his sons, with his eldest son (her father) receiving 467.75 acres which included the main house (which burned in 1851 and burned down during a storm in January 1890), although only 280.21 acres remained of Zoar by the time of his death. Douglas would be survived by at least three married daughters. Elizabeth Dandridge “Bessie” Douglas Moncure (1849-1934), Evelyn Spotswood Douglas Causey (1854-1934) and Mary Ellen Douglas Weathers (1861-1941).

== Death ==
Beverly Browne Douglas and his wife were among those interred in the Pollard family burying ground at "Zoar," with his gravestone bearing the epitaph, "an honest politician". Although the town of Aylett below Zoar burned during the American Civil War, Pollard family members continued to farm Zoar (and acquire nearby land) until Albert H. Stoddard III deeded 373.5 acres to Virginia's Department of Forestry in 1987. In addition to planting a memorial oak and maintaining the cemetery and remaining outbuildings, the Department of Forestry converted the last dwelling house on the site into offices. The Department of Forestry also makes the area available for recreational activities and wildlife habitat, as well as some agricultural use and sales of forest products.

== Elections ==
- 1874; Douglas was first elected to the U.S. House of Representatives with 50.69% of the vote, defeating Republican James Beverley Sener.
- 1876; Douglas was re-elected with 56.53% of the vote, defeating Republican L.C. Boiston.

== See also ==
- List of members of the United States Congress who died in office (1790–1899)

U.S. House of Representatives
| Preceded by James B. Sener | Member of the U.S. House of Representatives from Virginia's 1st congressional district 1875–1878 | Succeeded by Richard L. T. Beale |
