= Thomas Wilson (Virginia politician) =

American politician (1765–1826)

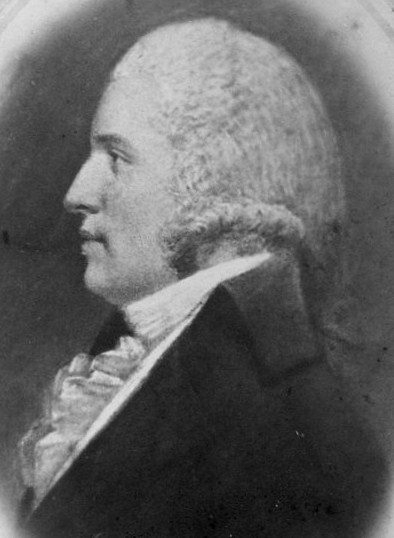

Member of the U.S. House of Representatives from Virginia's 1st district
- In office March 4, 1811 – March 3, 1813
- Preceded by: William McKinley
- Succeeded by: John G. Jackson

Member of the Virginia House of Delegates from Monongalia County
- In office 1816; Alongside Ralph Berkshire
- In office 1799; Alongside John Evans

Member of the Virginia Senate from Monongalia, Ohio, Harrison, Wood, Brooke and Randolph Counties
- In office 1800–1803
- Preceded by: John Haymond
- Succeeded by: Philip Doddridge

Member of the Virginia Senate from Monongalia, Ohio, Randolph and Harrison Counties
- In office 1792–1795
- Preceded by: John Duval
- Succeeded by: John Haymond

Personal details
- Born: September 11, 1765 Staunton, Virginia Colony, British America
- Died: January 24, 1826 (aged 60) Morgantown, Virginia, U.S.
- Resting place: Oak Grove Cemetery; Morgantown, Virginia, U.S.
- Party: Federalist
- Children: Edgar Campbell Wilson
- Relatives: Eugene McLanahan Wilson (grandson)
- Profession: lawyer

Military service
- Battles/wars: War of 1812

Thomas Wilson (September 11, 1765 – January 24, 1826) was a U.S. representative from Virginia, father of Edgar Campbell Wilson and grandfather of Eugene McLanahan Wilson.

== Early life ==
Wilson was born in Staunton in the Colony of Virginia, and studied law there.

== Career ==
He was admitted to the bar on September 21, 1789, and commenced practice in Morgantown, Virginia (now West Virginia). He served as member of the Virginia Senate from 1792 to 1795 and in the Virginia House of Delegates in 1799 and 1800. He was again a member of the Virginia Senate 1800–1804.

Wilson was elected as a Federalist to the Twelfth Congress (March 4, 1811 – March 3, 1813) defeating Democratic-Republican William McKinley. He was again a member of the Virginia House of Delegates in 1816 and 1817, after which he resumed the practice of law.

== Death ==
He died in Morgantown, Virginia (now West Virginia) on January 24, 1826, and was interred in Oak Grove Cemetery in Morgantown.

== Sources ==
- United States Congress. "Thomas Wilson (id: W000615)". Biographical Directory of the United States Congress.

U.S. House of Representatives
| Preceded by William McKinley | Member of the U.S. House of Representatives from Virginia's 1st congressional district 1811–1813 | Succeeded by John G. Jackson |
