= Xenophon Overton Pindall Law Office =

- U.S. National Register of Historic Places
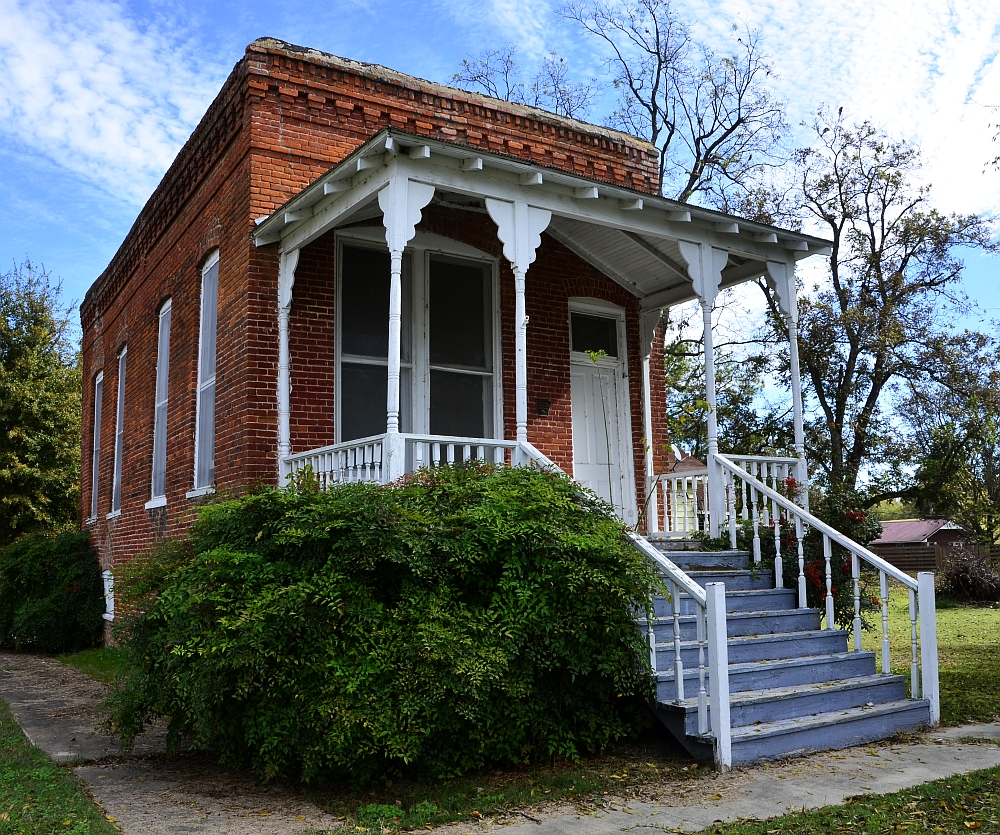

- Location within Arkansas Location within the United States
- Location: Jct. of Capitol and Kate Adams Sts., Arkansas City, Arkansas
- Coordinates: 33°36′22″N 91°12′11″W
- Area: less than one acre
- Built: 1882
- Architectural style: Italianate
- NRHP reference No.: 98000832
- Added to NRHP: May 10, 1999

The Xenophon Overton Pindall Law Office is listed on the National Register of Historic Places, and is located on the northeast corner of Capitol St. and Kate Adams Ave. in Arkansas City, Arkansas. It belonged to Xenophon Overton Pindall, who practiced in the building before becoming the acting governor of Arkansas in 1907.

== See also ==
- National Register of Historic Places listings in Desha County, Arkansas
