= James Beverley Sener =

American politician and jurist (1836–1903)

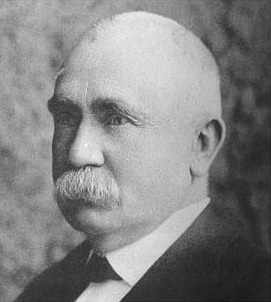

3rd Chief Justice of the Supreme Court of the Wyoming Territory
- In office December 18, 1879 – July 5, 1884
- Appointed by: Rutherford B. Hayes
- Preceded by: Joseph W. Fisher
- Succeeded by: John W. Lacey

Member of the U.S. House of Representatives from Virginia's 1st district
- In office March 4, 1873 – March 3, 1875
- Preceded by: John Critcher
- Succeeded by: Beverly B. Douglas

Personal details
- Born: May 18, 1837 Fredericksburg, Virginia
- Died: November 18, 1903 (aged 66) Washington, D.C.
- Resting place: Citizens Cemetery, Fredericksburg, Virginia
- Other political affiliations: Republican
- Education: University of Virginia; Washington College
- Occupation: Attorney, journalist

James Beverley Sener (May 18, 1837 – November 18, 1903) was a U.S. representative from Virginia and the third Chief Justice of the Supreme Court of the Wyoming Territory.

== Biography ==
Born in Fredericksburg, Virginia, Sener attended private schools and in 1859 was graduated from the University of Virginia at Charlottesville. He earned a law degree from Washington College (now Washington and Lee University) at Lexington in 1860. He was admitted to the bar the same year and commenced practice in Fredericksburg, Virginia. He became Sheriff of Fredericksburg in 1860, and was Sergeant of the city of Fredericksburg 1863–1865.

He served as Army correspondent of the Southern Associated Press with the army of Gen. Robert E. Lee. He became editor of the Fredericksburg (Virginia) Ledger in 1865. He served as delegate to the Republican National Convention in 1872.

Sener was elected as a Republican to the Forty-third Congress (March 4, 1873 – March 3, 1875) after defeating Democrat Everitt M. Braxton. He served as chairman of the Committee on Expenditures in the Department of Justice (Forty-third Congress). He was an unsuccessful candidate for reelection in 1874 to the Forty-fourth Congress. He resumed the practice of his profession. He served as chief justice of Wyoming Territory 1879–1884. He died in Washington, D.C., on November 18, 1903. He was interred in Citizens Cemetery, Fredericksburg, Virginia.

== Notable Policies ==
In 1832 alone, about 14% of the steam vessels in operation were destroyed by explosions, killing more than 1000 people. These explosions occurred largely because there were no inspection laws or rules of navigation. In some cases, mariner incompetence, negligence, misconduct, or all three were causal factors. As a result, the U.S. Congress established inspection laws and created the Steamboat Inspection Service. Congressman James Sener of Virginia sponsored the legislation that created the modern marine investigations program on 20 June 1874. Congressman Sener's bill put in place a world class system for identifying and eliminating unsafe conditions in the marine transportation system.

== Sources ==
- United States Congress. "James Beverley Sener (id: S000240)". Biographical Directory of the United States Congress.

U.S. House of Representatives
Preceded by John Critcher	Member of the U.S. House of Representatives from Virginia's 1st congressional district 1873–1875	Succeeded by Beverly B. Douglas
