= John Critcher =

American politician

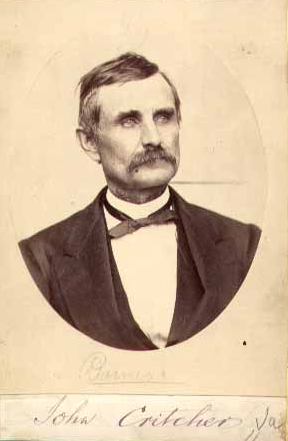

Member of the U.S. House of Representatives from Virginia's 1st district
- In office March 4, 1871 – March 3, 1873
- Preceded by: Richard S. Ayer
- Succeeded by: James B. Sener

Member of the Virginia Senate from King George, Westmoreland, Richmond, Northumberland and Lancaster Counties
- In office 1874–1877
- Preceded by: Meriwether Lewis
- Succeeded by: Edwin Betts

Member of the Virginia Senate from Westmoreland, Lancaster, Richmond and Northumberland Counties
- In office 1860–1861
- Preceded by: Richard L. T. Beale
- Succeeded by: George Lewis

Personal details
- Born: March 11, 1820 Oak Grove, Virginia, US
- Died: September 27, 1901 (aged 81) Alexandria, Virginia, US
- Resting place: Ivy Hill Cemetery, Alexandria, Virginia
- Party: Democratic
- Other political affiliations: Know Nothing (1850s)
- Education: University of Virginia
- Occupation: Attorney

Military service
- Allegiance: Confederate States of America
- Branch/service: Confederate States Army
- Rank: Lieutenant Colonel
- Battles/wars: American Civil War

John Critcher (March 11, 1820 – September 27, 1901) was a U.S. representative from Virginia.

== Early and family life ==
Born at Oak Grove, Westmoreland County, Virginia on March 11, 1820 to John Critcher and his wife, the former Sally Winter Covington, Critcher had a younger brother, Henry Payson Critcher (1826–1904), but his mother died shortly after the birth of her daughter Sarah, who died as an infant. John Critcher attended Brent's Preparatory School. He then went to Charlottesville, Virginia and attended the University of Virginia, graduating in 1839, and later pursued higher studies in France for three years.

About three years after his father's death at the family's plantation, "Waterview", on November 10, 1857, in Hampton, Virginia, John Critcher married Elizabeth Thomasia Kennon Whiting. Their first daughter, Elizabeth Whiting Critcher (1858–1863) did not survive to adulthood. However, their son John Critcher (1861–1939), born at the plantation "Audley" in Oak Grove and three daughters did survive their parents: Anne Wythe Mallory Critcher Gatewood (1860–1924), Louisa Kennon Critcher (1866–1939) and the painter Catharine Carter Critcher (1868–1964).

== Career ==
Critcher was admitted to the bar in 1842 and commenced practice in Westmoreland County, Virginia.

== American Civil War ==
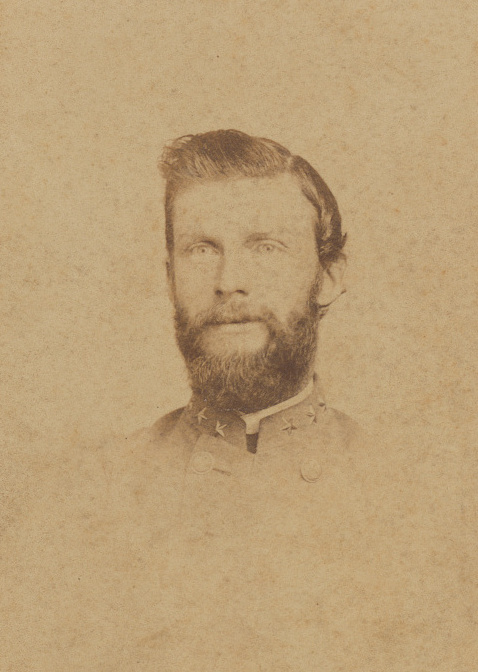
John Critcher in the Civil war

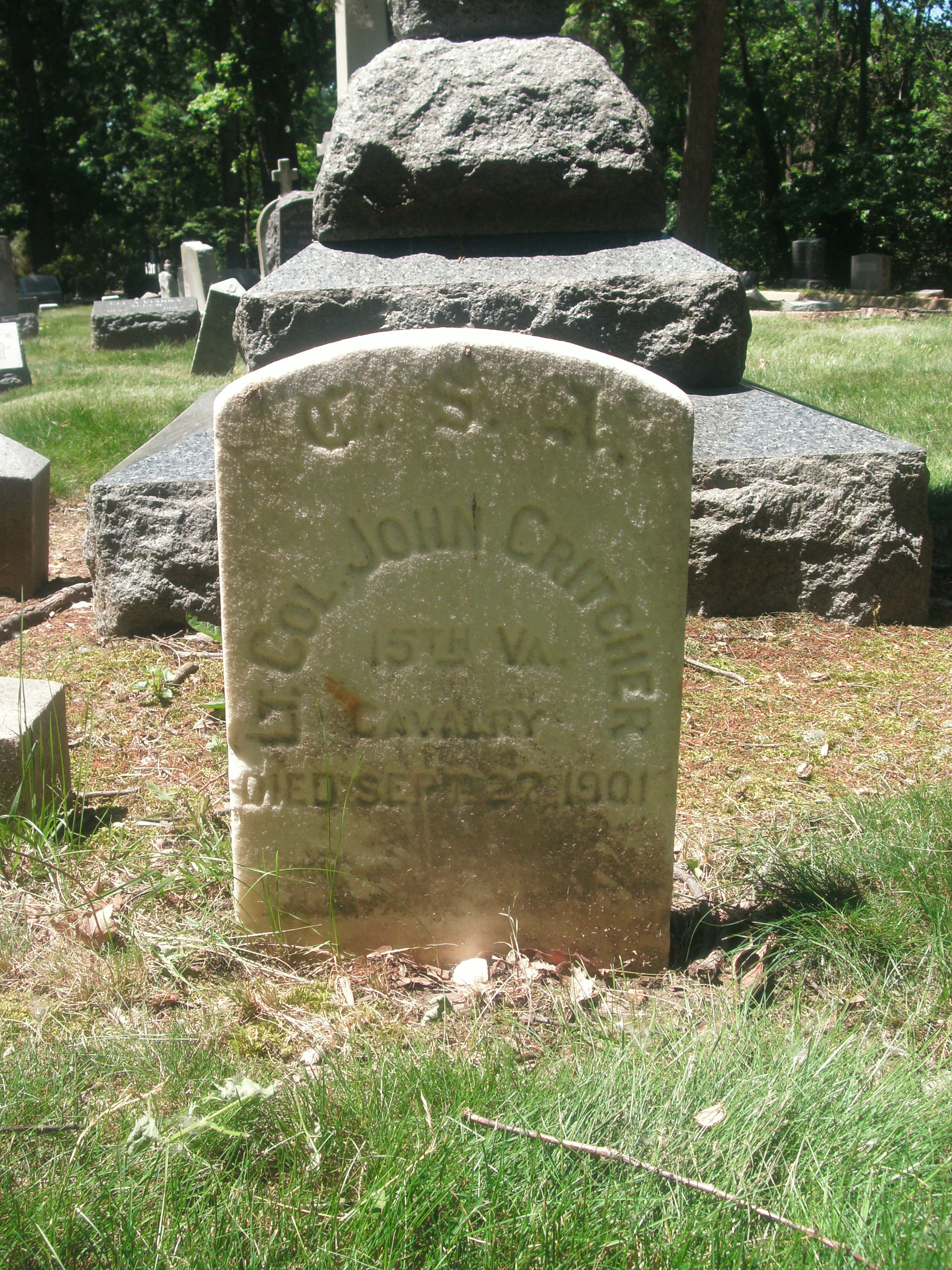
Grave marker of John Critcher

He served in the Virginia State Senate 1861 and as a member of the State secession convention in 1861. During the Civil War, Critcher enlisted as a major and later served as lieutenant colonel of the 15th Virginia Cavalry in the Confederate States Army.

Shortly after the war's end, the Virginia General Assembly appointed him judge of the eighth judicial circuit, but he was removed under Congressional Reconstruction, specifically the resolution dated February 18, 1869, which provided that anyone who had borne arms against the United States should be dismissed from office within thirty days, although Critcher later became a judge in Alexandria, Virginia after Reconstruction ended.

== Postwar career ==
When former Union officer Richard S. Ayer declined to run for re-election, Critcher was elected as a Democrat to the Forty-second Congress (March 4, 1871 – March 3, 1873). Northern Neck voters then elected Critcher again to the Virginia Senate (still a part-time position), where he served another four-year term (1873–1877), and was succeeded by William Mayo.

Critcher still operated a Westmoreland County farm during the 1880 census, but moved to Alexandria, Virginia, where he was a judge by 1894.

== Death and legacy ==
Critcher died in Alexandria, Virginia, September 27, 1901. He was interred in Ivy Hill Cemetery.

== Elections ==
- 1857; Critcher ran on the American Party ticket for the U.S. House of Representatives and lost to Democrat Muscoe R.H. Garnett.
- 1870; Critcher was elected to the U.S. House of Representatives unopposed.

U.S. House of Representatives
Preceded by Richard S. Ayer	Member of the U.S. House of Representatives from Virginia's 1st congressional district 1871–1873	Succeeded by James B. Sener
