= 1910 Arkansas gubernatorial election =

- September 12, 1910
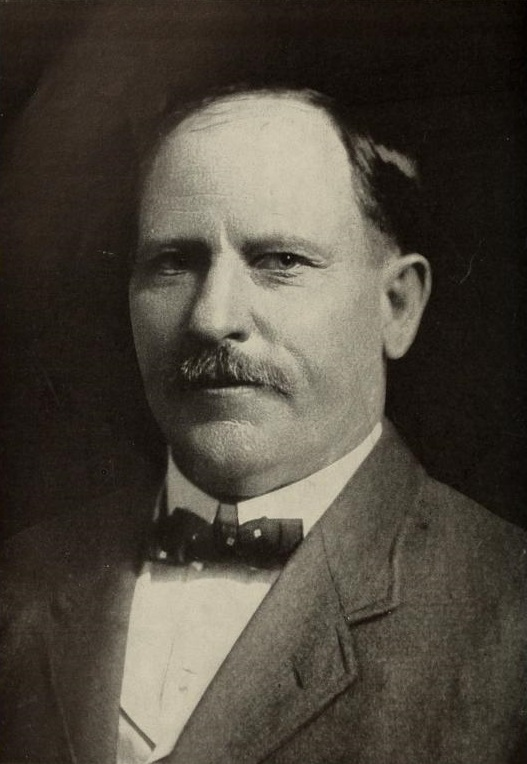

Nominee	George Washington Donaghey	Andrew I. Roland	Dan Hogan
Party	Democratic	Republican	Socialist
Popular vote	101,612	39,870	9,196
Percentage	67.44%	26.46%	6.10%
- County results Donaghey: 40–50% 50–60% 60–70% 70–80% 80–90% >90% Roland: 40–50% 50–60%
Governor before election
George Washington Donaghey
Democratic
Elected Governor
George Washington Donaghey
Democratic

The 1910 Arkansas gubernatorial election was held on September 12, 1910.

Incumbent Democratic Governor George Washington Donaghey defeated Republican nominee Andrew I. Roland and Socialist nominee Dan Hogan with 67.44% of the vote.

== General election ==
=== Candidates ===
- George Washington Donaghey, Democratic, incumbent Governor
- Andrew I. Roland, Republican, judge
- Dan Hogan, Socialist, publisher, candidate for Governor in 1906

=== Results ===
1910 Arkansas gubernatorial election
Party	Candidate	Votes	%	±%
Democratic	George Washington Donaghey (incumbent)	101,612	67.44%	
Republican	Andrew I. Roland	39,870	26.46%	
Socialist	Dan Hogan	9,196	6.10%	
Majority		61,742	40.98%	
Turnout		150,678		
Democratic hold		Swing		
