= Thomas Newton Jr. =

American politician (1768–1847)

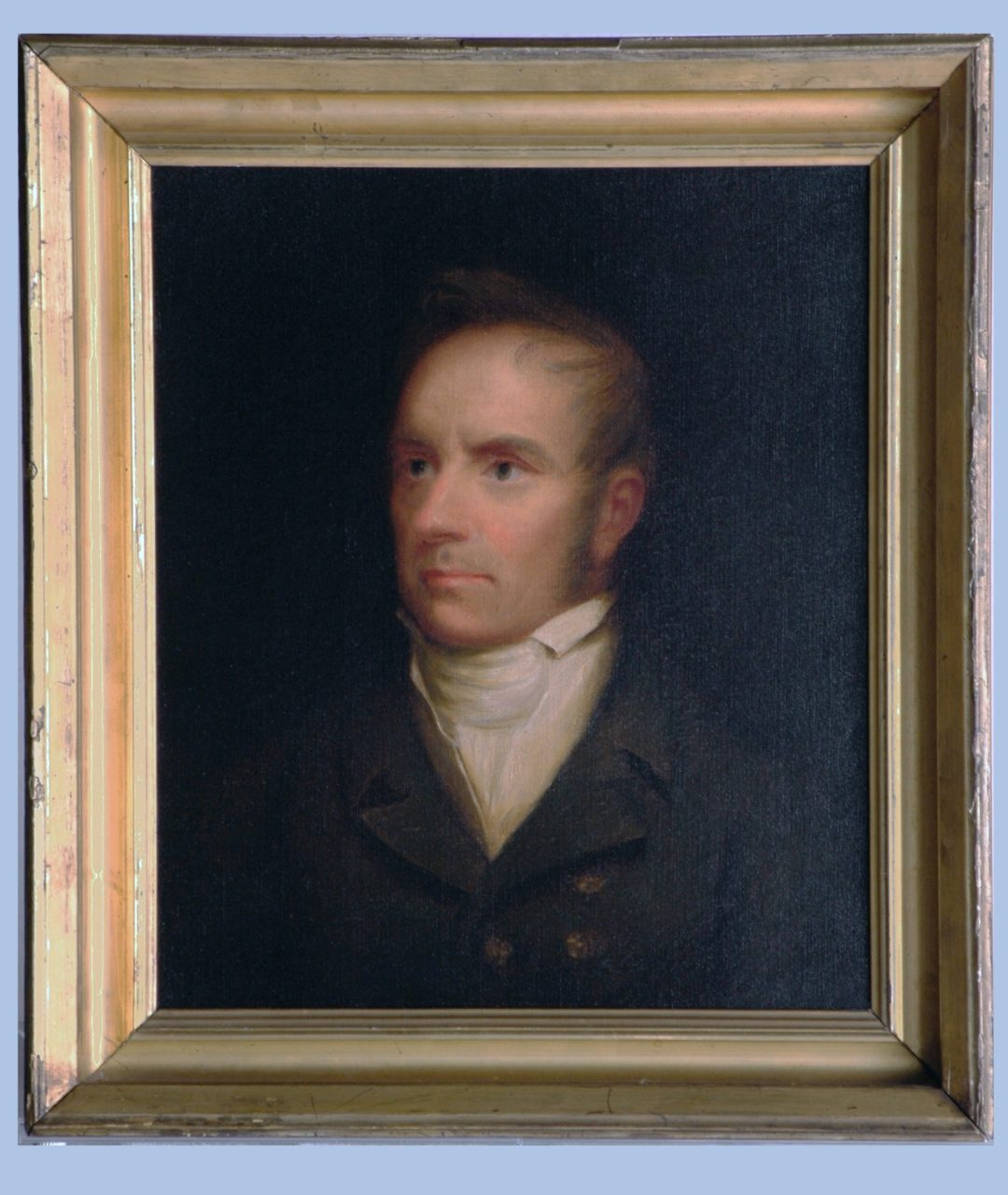

Dean of the United States House of Representatives
- In office March 4, 1817 – March 4, 1830
- Preceded by: John Davenport
- Succeeded by: William McCoy

Member of the U.S. House of Representatives from Virginia
- In office March 4, 1831 – March 3, 1833
- Preceded by: George Loyall
- Succeeded by: George Loyall
- Constituency: 1st district
- In office March 4, 1801 – March 9, 1830
- Preceded by: Josiah Parker
- Succeeded by: George Loyall
- Constituency: 11th district (1801–1803); 20th district (1803–1813); 21st district (1813–1823); 1st district (1823–1830)

Chairman of the Committee on Commerce
- In office March 4, 1819 – March 4, 1827
- Preceded by: Himself (as Chairman of the Committee on Commerce and Manufactures)
- Succeeded by: Churchill Caldom Cambreleng

Chairman of the Committee on Commerce and Manufactures
- In office March 4, 1807 – March 4, 1819
- Preceded by: Jacob Crowninshield
- Succeeded by: Himself (as Chairman of the Committee on Commerce)

Member of the Virginia House of Delegates from Norfolk Borough
- In office 1796–1798
- Preceded by: Himself
- Succeeded by: Robert Taylor
- In office 1794
- Preceded by: Thomas Mathews
- Succeeded by: Himself

Personal details
- Born: November 21, 1768 Norfolk, Virginia Colony, British America
- Died: August 5, 1847 (aged 78) Norfolk, Virginia, U.S.
- Party: National Republican (1825–1847)
- Other political affiliations: Democratic-Republican (until 1825)
- Children: John
- Profession: politician, lawyer

Thomas Newton Jr. (November 21, 1768 – August 5, 1847) was an American politician who was a U.S. representative from Virginia from 1801 until his retirement in 1833. Union general John Newton was his son.

== Biography ==
Newton was born in Norfolk, Virginia, on November 21, 1768, the son of Thomas Newton.

Newton was a member of the Virginia House of Delegates from 1796 to 1799. He served as a Democratic-Republican in the United States House of Representatives from March 4, 1801, to March 9, 1830, losing his seat when George Loyall contested his election. Newton regained his seat at the next election and served a final term from March 4, 1831, to March 3, 1833. In the bitterly contested 1824 presidential election, Newton was the only Virginia representative to support the Adams-Clay coalition. In 1804, Newton was one of the impeachment managers appointed by the House to prosecute the case for conviction on the articles of impeachment adopted against Judge John Pickering in his impeachment trial.

== Electoral history ==
- 1823; Newton was re-elected unopposed.
- 1825; Newton was re-elected unopposed.
- 1827; Newton was re-elected with 64.28% of the vote, defeating Independent George Loyall.
- 1829; Newton was re-elected with 50.35% of the vote, but the election was invalidated and Loyall was seated.
- 1831; Newton was re-elected with 51.01% of the vote, defeating Jacksonian Loyall.

U.S. House of Representatives
Preceded by Josiah Parker	Member of the U.S. House of Representatives from Virginia's 11th congressional district 1801–1803	Succeeded by Anthony New
Preceded by District established	Member of the U.S. House of Representatives from Virginia's 20th congressional district 1803–1813	Succeeded by James Johnson
Preceded by Hugh Nelson	Member of the U.S. House of Representatives from Virginia's 21st congressional district 1813–1823	Succeeded by William Smith
Preceded by Edward B. Jackson	Member of the U.S. House of Representatives from Virginia's 1st congressional district 1823–1830	Succeeded by George Loyall
Preceded by George Loyall	Member of the U.S. House of Representatives from Virginia's 1st congressional district 1831–1833	Succeeded by George Loyall
Political offices
Preceded by Jacob Crowninshield; Massachusetts	Chairman of the Committee on Commerce and Manufactures; 1807–1819	Succeeded by Himself as Chairman of the Committee on Commerce
Preceded by Himself as Chairman of the Committee on Commerce and Manufactures	Chairman of the Committee on Commerce; 1819–1827	Succeeded by Churchill Caldom Cambreleng; New York
