= John G. Jackson (politician) =

American judge (1777–1825)

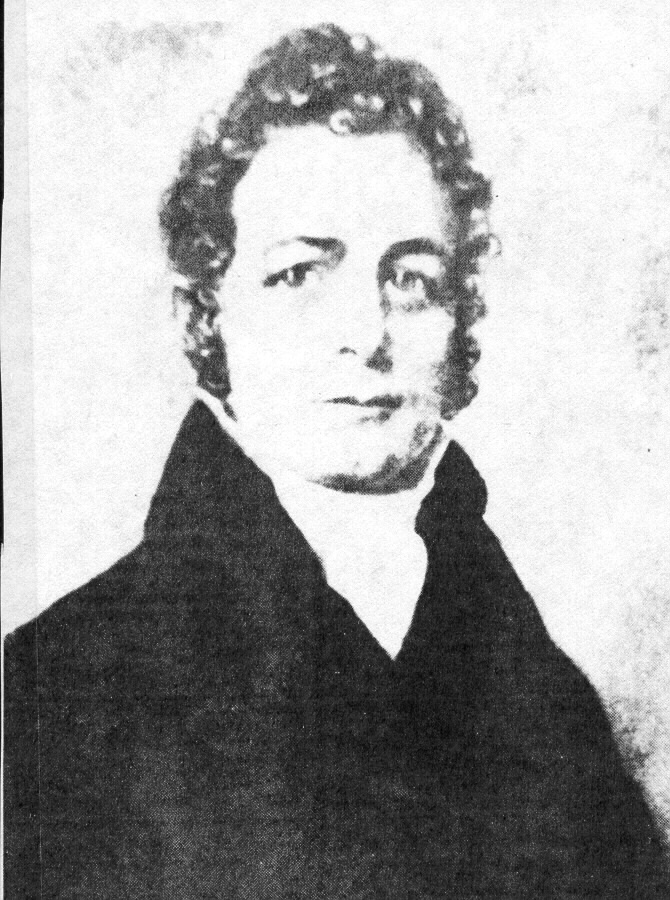

Judge of the United States District Court for the Western District of Virginia
- In office February 24, 1819 – March 28, 1825
- Appointed by: James Monroe
- Preceded by: Seat established by 3 Stat. 478
- Succeeded by: Philip C. Pendleton

Member of the U.S. House of Representatives from Virginia's 1st district
- In office March 4, 1813 – March 3, 1817
- Preceded by: Thomas Wilson
- Succeeded by: James Pindall
- In office March 4, 1803 – September 28, 1810
- Preceded by: John Smith
- Succeeded by: William McKinley

Personal details
- Born: John George Jackson; September 22, 1777 Buckhannon, Virginia
- Died: March 28, 1825 (aged 47) Clarksburg, Virginia
- Resting place: Old Jackson Cemetery; Clarksburg, West Virginia
- Party: Democratic-Republican
- Relations: Dolley Madison; Return J. Meigs Jr.
- Parent: George Jackson (father)
- Relatives: Edward B. Jackson; William Thomas Bland; John Jay Jackson Jr.
- Education: read law

John George Jackson (September 22, 1777 – March 28, 1825) was a United States representative from Virginia and a United States district judge of the United States District Court for the Western District of Virginia.

== Education and career ==
Born on September 22, 1777, near Buckhannon, Virginia (now West Virginia), Jackson moved with his parents to Clarksburg, Virginia (now West Virginia) in 1784, receiving an English training and becoming a civil engineer. He was a surveyor of the public lands west of the Ohio River from 1796 to 1798. He read law in 1801. He was a member of the Virginia House of Delegates from 1798 to 1801, and from 1811 to 1812. He was in private practice in Clarksburg from 1801 to 1803, and from 1817 to 1819.

== Congressional and militia service ==
Jackson was elected as a Democratic-Republican from Virginia's 1st congressional district to the United States House of Representatives of the 8th United States Congress and to the three succeeding Congresses and served from March 4, 1803, to September 28, 1810, when he resigned. While in the United States Congress, he fought a duel with United States Representatives Joseph Pearson of North Carolina, and on the second fire was wounded in the hip. He was a brigadier general of the Virginia Militia in 1812. He was elected as a Democratic-Republican from Virginia's 1st congressional district to the United States House of Representatives of the 13th and 14th United States Congresses, serving from March 4, 1813, to March 3, 1817. He declined to be a candidate for reelection in 1816 to the 15th United States Congress.

== Federal judicial service ==
Jackson was nominated by President James Monroe on February 20, 1819, to the United States District Court for the Western District of Virginia, to a new seat authorized by 3 Stat. 478. He was confirmed by the United States Senate on February 24, 1819, and received his commission the same day. His service terminated on March 28, 1825, due to his death in Clarksburg. He was interred in the Old Jackson Cemetery in Clarksburg.

== Family ==
Jackson was the son of George Jackson, a United States Representative from Virginia, the brother of Edward B. Jackson, a United States Representative from Virginia, and the grandfather of William Thomas Bland, a United States Representative from Missouri.

Prior to marriage, Jackson had a son, General John J. Jackson, the father of John Jay Jackson Jr. Jackson's first wife Mary "Polly" Payne was the youngest sister of Dolley Madison - they were married in 1800. She died in 1808 of tuberculosis and is buried in the Jackson Cemetery in Clarksburg, WV. Jackson continued to correspond with Dolley Madison after the death of his wife and her sister. On June 11, 1810, shortly before he married Mary Sophia Meigs, the daughter of Return J. Meigs Jr., he wrote Dolley that his new wife "is about the size of our dear Mary, [and] much such a person."

== Theater fire ==
On December 26, 1811, Jackson escaped a deadly fire that swept through a theater in Richmond, Virginia, killing, among others, Governor of Virginia William Smith.

== Elections ==
- 1803; Jackson was first elected to the U.S. House of Representatives, defeating Federalist Thomas Wilson.
- 1805; Jackson was re-elected with 57.21% of the vote, defeating Wilson.
- 1807; Jackson was re-elected with 58.89% of the vote, defeating Federalist Noah Winsly.
- 1809; Jackson was re-elected with 60.26% of the vote, defeating Linsly.
- 1813; Jackson was re-elected with 60.21% of the vote, defeating Wilson.
- 1815; Jackson was re-elected unopposed.

== Biographies ==
Two books have been written about Jackson's life.

== Sources ==
- United States Congress. "John George Jackson (id: J000021)". Biographical Directory of the United States Congress.
- John George Jackson at the Biographical Directory of Federal Judges, a publication of the Federal Judicial Center.
- Hon. Armistead M. Dobie, "Federal District Judges in Virginia before the Civil War," 12 F.R.D. 451 (1951,1952) (viewed on Westlaw)

U.S. House of Representatives
Preceded by John Smith	Member of the U.S. House of Representatives from Virginia's 1st congressional district 1803–1810	Succeeded by William McKinley
Preceded by Thomas Wilson	Member of the U.S. House of Representatives from Virginia's 1st congressional district 1813–1817	Succeeded by James Pindall
Legal offices
Preceded by Seat established by 3 Stat. 478	Judge of the United States District Court for the Western District of Virginia; 1819–1825	Succeeded by Philip C. Pendleton
