= Joseph Segar =

American politician

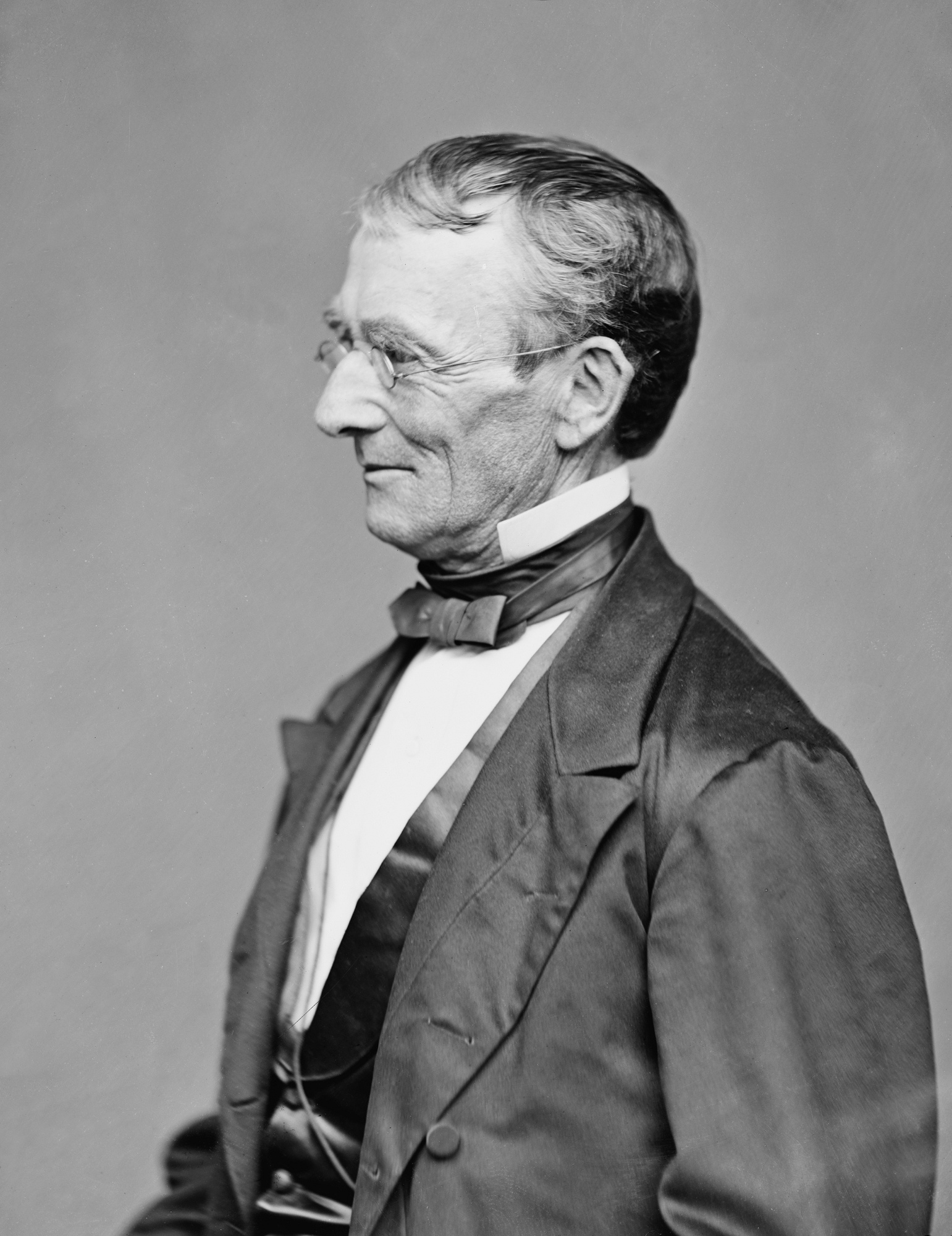

Member of the U.S. House of Representatives from Virginia's 1st district
- In office March 16, 1862 – March 3, 1863
- Preceded by: Joseph Segar
- Succeeded by: Richard S. Ayer (1870)

Member of the U.S. House of Representatives from Virginia's 1st district
- In office 1861–1862(not seated)
- Preceded by: Muscoe Russell Hunter Garnett
- Succeeded by: Joseph Segar

Member of the Virginia House of Delegates from Elizabeth City, York and Warwick Counties and Williamsburg City
- In office 1855–1861
- Preceded by: Robert H. Power
- Succeeded by: James Custis

Member of the Virginia House of Delegates from Elizabeth City, York and Warwick Counties and Williamsburg City
- In office 1852–1853
- Preceded by: District created
- Succeeded by: Robert H. Power

Member of the Virginia House of Delegates from Elizabeth City and Warwick Counties
- In office 1848–1851
- Preceded by: Edward Camm
- Succeeded by: District abolished

Member of the Virginia House of Delegates from Northampton County
- In office 1836–1838
- Preceded by: Severn Parker
- Succeeded by: George Yerby

Personal details
- Born: June 1, 1804 King William County, Virginia, U.S.
- Died: April 30, 1880 (aged 75) Chesapeake Bay, Virginia, U.S.
- Resting place: Hampton, Virginia, U.S.
- Party: Unionist
- Occupation: Attorney

Joseph Eggleston Segar (June 1, 1804 – April 30, 1880) was a Virginia lawyer, plantation owner, hotelier, and politician who was twice elected as a U.S. representative from Virginia during the American Civil War. A staunch Unionist, Segar was notable for his opposition to Virginia's secession and his support for Abraham Lincoln's administration.

== Early and family life ==
Born in King William County, Virginia, Segar attended the common schools and later studied law. He married Mary (née Simkins) (1808–1886). They had several children, including a son John F. Segar (b. 1836) and a daughter, Virginia “Jennie” Segar (b. 1846).

== Career ==
Admitted to the bar, Joseph Segar practiced law in various counties in the Hampton Roads area, Elizabeth City County being across Chesapeake Bay from Norfolk, Virginia. Segar held several local offices, and was elected to represent Elizabeth City County and various neighboring counties several times (part time) in the Virginia House of Delegates, 1836–1838, 1848–1853, and 1855-1861.

As a long-serving member of the Virginia General Assembly, Segar had voted against several disunion measures prior to the Civil War. In the spring of 1861, he attempted to prevent Virginia’s seizure of federal arms at Bellona Arsenal near Richmond, a move that signaled Virginia’s preparations for war before formally seceding. Along with other Unionist delegates, Segar broke quorum by leaving the legislative chamber to delay the authorization of this seizure. Although ultimately unsuccessful, his efforts demonstrated his commitment to the Union.

Although a devoted supporter of the Union, Segar owned slaves. In 1840, his household included five slaves. Segar owned seven slaves in 1860. A lifelong Republican and supporter of Lincolnism, by the time the Civil War broke out in 1861, Segar publicly espoused views sympathetic to the abolition of slavery: “The everlasting hills do not more firmly cling to their base, than do I to these, my opinions, against secession, and to my resolve, now herein repeated before God and man, to stand by them now and forever. I am thus explicit, that there may be no misunderstanding between me and those whose suffrages I stand for.” By the close of the war, he was calling slavery “one of the greatest evils that ever afflicted and cursed [the United States].”

Along with a partner, Segar purchased half of the original Hygeia Hotel near Fort Monroe at Old Point Comfort for $90,000 and ran it for several years, making Caleb C. Willard a co-owner and administrator of operations in 1859 for the sum of $15,000. In October 1862, the United States government deemed the Hygeia Hotel inconvenient to the operations of the Army at Old Point Comfort, and it was demolished, without any compensation to Segar or Willard. Eliminating the Hygeia Hotel minimized non-military visitors to Fort Monroe, including potential Southern spies. Removal also improved the upstream field of fire on the James River.

Joseph Segar engaged in frequent correspondence with President Abraham Lincoln. Most of the time it involved official business, although occasionally it was personal, like on January 24, 1862 when, as a gift, Segar sent a crate of terrapins to the White House for Lincoln to consume.

== Civil War Contributions to the Union ==
Segar’s farm, known as Roseland, became an indispensable Union stronghold during the Civil War. The day after Virginia's secession on May 23, 1861, Segar complied with Union forces at Fort Monroe and his entire 447-acre property was taken for Union use. The camp was initially called Camp Troy, but later Camp Hamilton to honor then Lt.Col. Schuyler Hamilton, secretary to Gen. Winfield Scott.

On May 24, 1861, the levying of the historic Contraband Decision occurred near the gates of Segar’s farm, in the area known at the time as the Fort Fields (present-day County Street in Phoebus at the Hampton National Cemetery). Flanked by Joseph Segar and Union staff members, General Benjamin Butler and Major John B. Cary met at this location, where Butler declared to Cary that enslaved individuals escaping to Union lines would not be returned to their Confederate enslavers. In the coming weeks and months, this decision initiated a mass exodus of enslaved people seeking freedom behind Union lines at Segar’s property and at Fort Monroe.

As a result, the farm and the surrounding area not only acted as a Union encampment but also became one of the first freed Black communities in the South, known as Sugar Hill. Along with Union veterans who remained after the war ended, the growth of this community laid the foundation for what would later become the Town of Phoebus.

== Congressional career ==
Segar presented credentials as a Unionist Member-elect to the Thirty-seventh Congress from an election held on October 24, 1861, but the House on February 11, 1862, decided he was not entitled to the seat. Segar was subsequently elected to the same Congress and served from March 15, 1862, to March 3, 1863.

In the Thirty-eighth Congress (1863–1865), no Virginia representatives were seated. Segar presented credentials, but was declared not entitled to the seat by resolution of May 17, 1864, though he was paid for mileage and pro-rated salary.

Segar presented credentials on February 17, 1865, as a United States senator-elect to fill the vacancy in the term commencing March 4, 1863, caused by the death of Lemuel J. Bowden, but was not permitted to take his seat. In the first session of the Virginia General Assembly following passage of Virginia's Constitution of 1869, his nephew Arthur S. Segar was one of Norfolk City's two delegates, alongside Republican Henry M. Bowden.

On January 25, 1870, in the Forty-first Congress, Segar claimed an at-large ninth seat for Virginia in the U.S. House, but was not seated. The recent Virginia constitutional convention had asserted the ninth seat, but Congress only allowed eight seats to Virginia, since its apportionment of eleven seats had been reduced by the three seats assigned to the new state of West Virginia in 1863.

Segar was an unsuccessful Republican candidate for election in 1876 to the Forty-fifth Congress.

== Later life ==
The Union’s use of Segar’s farm during the war came at a tremendous financial cost to Segar. According to federal affidavits and postwar records, Union forces and formerly enslaved peoples repurposed nearly every aspect of the property. Segar’s outbuildings and fences were dismantled for firewood and housing, his timber harvested for Union outbuildings, his crops destroyed, and his home repurposed as the quartermaster’s headquarters. Furthermore, the land itself was carved into a complex network of ditches, roads, and redoubts, permanently altering its topography and making it difficult to farm.

After the war, the US Army sold off all the buildings they’d erected on Segar’s farm and returned ownership to him on January 1, 1867. Segar found himself in a dire financial situation after the war. Camp Hamilton and its operations wiped clean the resources of his farm, and the burning of the town of Hampton, Virginia destroyed all of the Elizabeth City County courthouse records, leaving Segar unaware of who owed him money and to whom he was in debt. To address the debts, Segar asked that his land be placed in the hands of the court and that it be sold to satisfy the claims against him. He requested special consideration for relief by Congress during this time, asking rhetorically “Am I who stood by the Union, in sunshine and in storm, to be deprived of my property and to be ruined, because my deluded State chose to commit the wickedness of secession?” Segar’s request for special relief went unsuccessful for many years.

Through the early 1870s, Segar continued to seek compensation for his losses through the Southern Claims Commission, which adjudicated requests from loyal Unionists who suffered property damage during the conflict. The commission placed significant weight on evidence that claimants had not only remained loyal to the Union but also contributed actively to its cause. Segar’s political service and outspoken Unionism served as compelling evidence of his loyalty. In his petition to the Southern Claims Commission, Segar recounted his loyalty and described the extensive sacrifices his land and resources had made to support the Union cause. “I was immovably loyal to the Union both before and during the rebellion, and still am. I refused to follow my State into the crime of secession” he argued. His petition was finally approved in 1874.

During the administration of President Rutherford B. Hayes, Segar received an appointment to the Spanish Claims Commission, serving from 1877 to 1880.

Segar died on a steamer while en route from Norfolk, Virginia, to Washington, D.C., on April 30, 1880. J. J. Stewart of Baltimore succeeded him as arbitrator for the Spanish Claims Commission. He was interred in St. John's Cemetery, Hampton, Virginia, where his widow joined him eight years later.

== Sources ==
- United States Congress. "Joseph Segar (id: S000227)". Biographical Directory of the United States Congress.

U.S. House of Representatives
Preceded by Muscoe R. H. Garnett	Member of the U.S. House of Representatives from Virginia's 1st congressional district 1862–1863	Succeeded by Richard S. Ayer (1870)
