= William McKinley (Virginia politician) =

American politician

Member of the U.S. House of Representatives from Virginia's 1st district
- In office December 21, 1810 – March 3, 1811
- Preceded by: John G. Jackson
- Succeeded by: Thomas Wilson

Member of the Virginia House of Delegates from Ohio County
- In office 1824–1825; Alongside Jacob Zachariah, Isaac Leffler
- In office 1820; Alongside Moses Chapline
- In office 1806; Alongside William Irwin
- In office 1803; Alongside John Morgan
- In office 1801; Alongside Henry Smith
- In office 1799–1800; Alongside John Morgan, Henry Smith
- In office 1798; Alongside Archibald Woods

Personal details
- Born: Unknown Virginia
- Died: Unknown
- Party: Democratic-Republican

William McKinley was a U.S. representative from Virginia.

== Biography ==
Born in Virginia, McKinley completed preparatory studies. He served as member of the Virginia House of Delegates from Ohio County, Virginia (now part of West Virginia) from 1798 to 1804, 1806, and 1807.

McKinley was elected as a Democratic-Republican to the Eleventh Congress to fill the vacancy caused by the resignation of United States Representative John G. Jackson and served from December 21, 1810 to March 3, 1811.

He later served again as member of the Virginia House of Delegates, 1820, 1821, and 1824–1826.

== Sources ==
- United States Congress. "William McKinley (id: M000520)". Biographical Directory of the United States Congress.

U.S. House of Representatives
Preceded by John G. Jackson	Member of the U.S. House of Representatives from Virginia's 1st congressional district 1810–1811	Succeeded by Thomas Wilson
