= Richard S. Ayer =

American politician

Richard Small Ayer
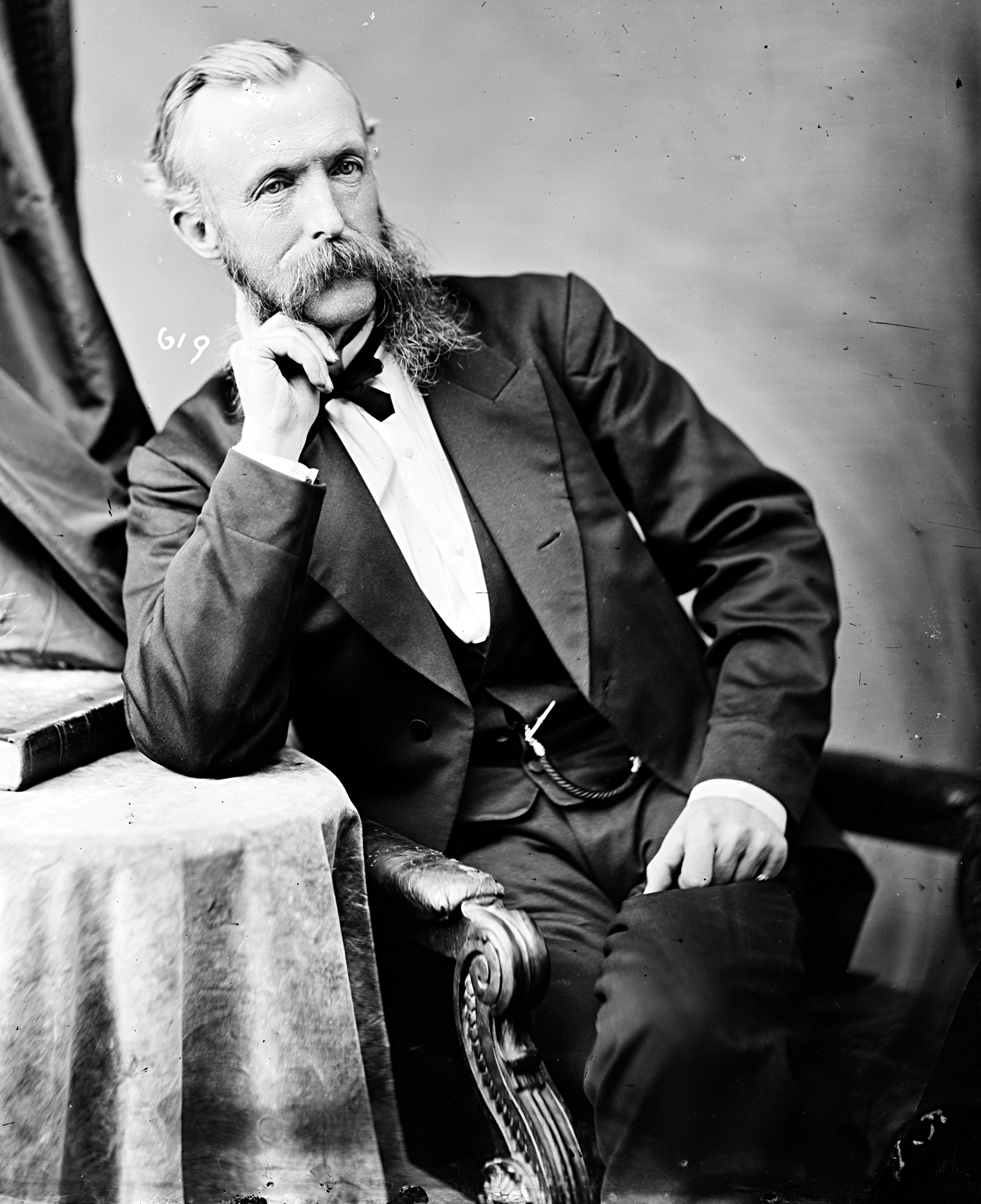

Member of the U.S. House of Representatives from Virginia's 1st district
- In office January 31, 1870 – March 3, 1871
- Preceded by: Joseph Segar
- Succeeded by: John Critcher

Member of the Maine House of Representatives
- In office 1888

Personal details
- Born: October 9, 1829 Montville, Maine, US
- Died: December 14, 1896 (aged 67) Liberty, Maine, US
- Resting place: Montville, Maine, US
- Party: Republican
- Occupation: farmer, merchant

Military service
- Allegiance: United States
- Branch/service: United States Army
- Years of service: 1861–1863
- Rank: First Lieutenant
- Unit: 4th Maine Infantry
- Battles/wars: American Civil War

Richard Small Ayer (October 9, 1829 – December 14, 1896) was a U.S. representative from Virginia.

== Early and family life ==
Born in Montville, Maine, Ayer attended the common schools.

== Career ==
Ayer farmed and worked as a merchant for several years. During the Civil War, Ayers enlisted in 1861 in the Union Army as a private in Company A, Fourth Regiment, Maine Volunteer Infantry. He was later promoted to first lieutenant and was mustered out as a captain on March 22, 1863, for disability.

Ayer settled in Virginia's Northern Neck in 1865 near Warsaw. In 1867, voters elected him a delegate to the Virginia Constitutional Convention of 1868, which was necessary for the Commonwealth to be readmitted to the Union since its prior constitution permitted slavery. Voters overwhelmingly ratified the new Constitution presented by the convention in 1869, and Virginia was readmitted to the Union. Later that year, voters elected Ayer as a Republican to the Forty-first Congress. He defeated Conservative Joseph Eggleton Segar (whom the U.S. Congress had refused to seat the previous two sessions and again unsuccessfully claimed a seat in this Congress) as well as Independents Daniel M. Norton (an African American aligned with the Readjuster Party who also had served in that constitutional convention and would serve in the Virginia Senate) and George W. Lewis. Ayer served from January 31, 1870, until March 3, 1871. However, he was not a candidate for renomination in 1870. Former Confederate veteran and Democrat John Critcher was elected and served one term.

Ayer returned to farming, as well as moved back to Montville, Maine. He later ran for election there and served as member of the State house of representatives in 1888.

== Death and legacy ==
Ayer died in Liberty, Maine, December 14, 1896. He was interred in Mount Repose Cemetery, Montville, Maine.

== Sources ==
- United States Congress. "Richard S. Ayer (id: A000351)". Biographical Directory of the United States Congress.

U.S. House of Representatives
Preceded by Joseph Segar (1863)	Member of the U.S. House of Representatives from Virginia's 1st congressional district 1870–1871	Succeeded by George T. Garrison
