= John Isaac Moore =

Former acting governor of Arkansas

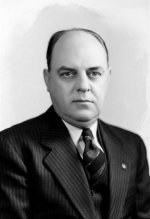

Acting Governor of Arkansas
- In office February 15, 1907 – May 14, 1907
- Preceded by: John Sebastian Little
- Succeeded by: Xenophon Overton Pindall (acting)

Speaker of the Arkansas House of Representatives
- In office 1903–1905
- Preceded by: T. H. Humphreys
- Succeeded by: William W. Cate

Member of the Arkansas House of Representatives
- In office 1882; 1901; 1903

Member of the Arkansas Senate
- In office 1905; 1907; 1913; 1915

Personal details
- Born: February 7, 1856 Lafayette County, Mississippi, U.S.
- Died: March 18, 1937 (aged 81) Helena, Arkansas, U.S.
- Party: Democratic
- Spouse: Maie Davidson Moore
- Children: 2

John Isaac Moore (February 7, 1856 – March 18, 1937) was a member of the Arkansas Senate and the acting governor of Arkansas. He also a member of the Democratic Party; associated with its reform wing.

== Biography ==
Moore was born in Lafayette County, Mississippi, and graduated from the University of Arkansas in 1881. He studied law and was admitted to the Arkansas bar in 1882. He died on March 18, 1937.

== Career ==
From 1894 to 1900, Moore served as probate judge in Phillips County, Arkansas. He was elected to the Arkansas House of Representatives in 1882, 1901, and 1903. In 1903, he served as speaker of the house.

Moore was elected to the Arkansas Senate in 1904. He served in the Senate in 1905, 1907, 1913, and 1915.

On February 11, 1907, Governor John Sebastian Little resigned from office due to mental and physical illness. Moore, who was president of the Senate at the time, became acting governor. He served as governor until the legislature adjourned on 14 May 1907.

Moore later served as a member of the Arkansas Board of State capital commissioners. He was a member of the Arkansas Constitutional Convention from 1917 to 1918.

== See also ==
- List of governors of Arkansas

Political offices
Preceded by John Sebastian Little; Governor	Acting Governor of Arkansas; 1907	Succeeded by Xenophon Overton Pindall
