= Virginia's 1st congressional district =

U.S. House district for Virginia

Coordinates: 37°51′08″N 76°54′24″W

- Interactive map of district boundaries since 2023
- Representative: Rob Wittman; R–Montross
- Distribution: 69.54% urban; 30.46% rural
- Population (2025): 839,557
- Median household income: $111,762
- Ethnicity: 70% White; 13% Black; 6% Hispanic; 6% Asian; 4% Two or more races; 1% other
- Cook PVI: R+3

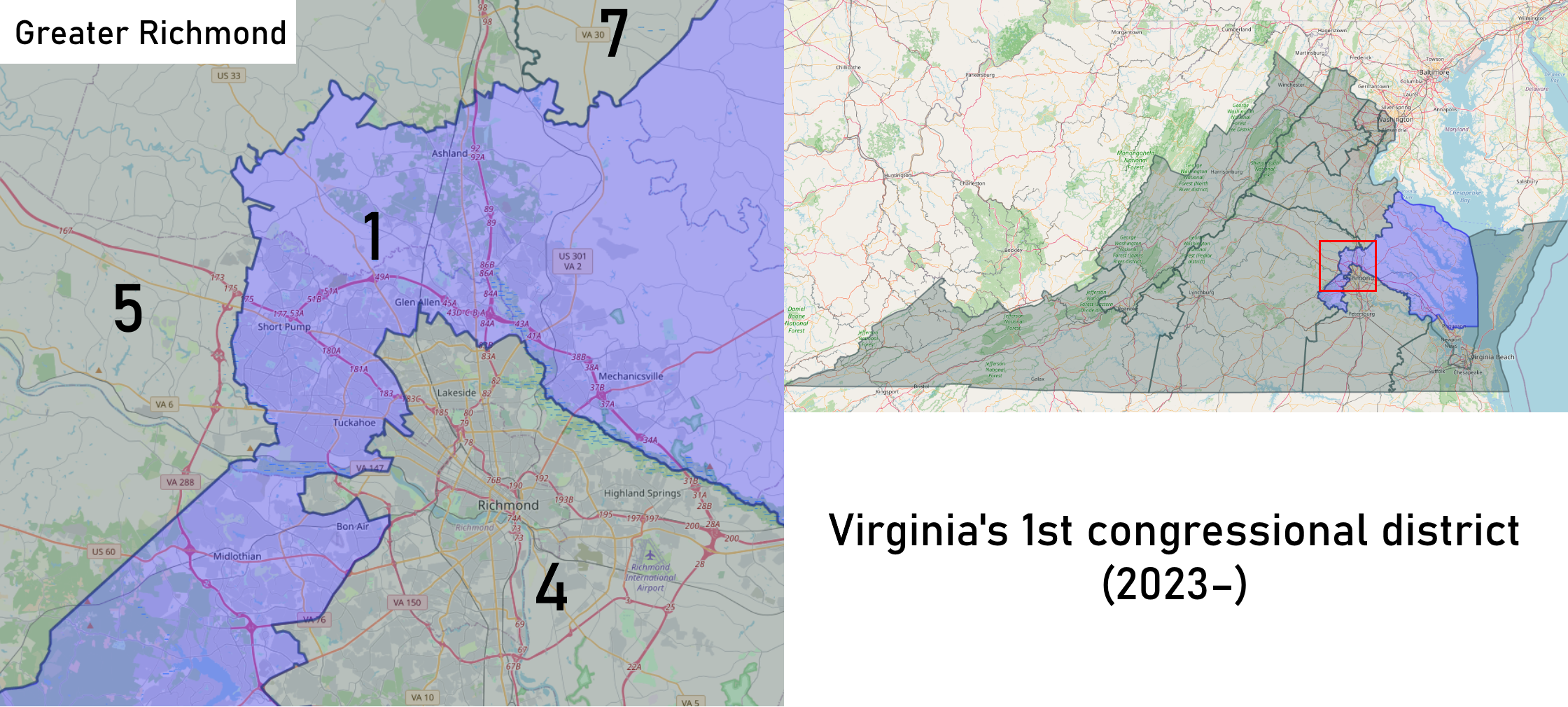
Virginia's 1st congressional district from January 3, 2023

Virginia's first congressional district is a United States congressional district in the commonwealth of Virginia. It stretches from the Richmond suburbs towards the Northern Neck and Middle Peninsula. The district encompasses the Historic Triangle of Jamestown, Williamsburg, and Yorktown. The district includes major military installation and has been represented by Republican Rob Wittman since 2007.

The district is sometimes referred to as "America's First District" since it includes the Historic Triangle of Jamestown, Williamsburg, and Yorktown. In the 18th and early 19th century, it comprised northwestern Virginia (that became Frederick County, Virginia as well as the Eastern Panhandle of West Virginia after the American Civil War).

In 2016, the adjacent 3rd district was ruled unconstitutional. New districts have been drawn.

== Recent district election results from statewide races ==
Year	Office	Results
2008	President	McCain 58% - 41%
2008	Senate	Warner 57% - 42%
2009	Governor	McDonnell 70% - 30%
2009	Lt. Governor	Bolling 67% - 33%
2009	Attorney General	Cuccinelli 69% - 31%
2012	President	Romney 59% - 39%
2012	Senate	Allen 57% - 42%
2013	Governor	Cuccinelli 53% - 36%
2013	Lt. Governor	Jackson 51% - 48%
2013	Attorney General	Obenshain 60% - 40%
2014	Senate	Gillespie 58% - 39%
2016	President	Trump 54% - 40%
2017	Governor	Gillespie 55% - 44%
2017	Lt. Governor	Vogel 57% - 43%
2017	Attorney General	Donley Adams 57% - 43%
2018	Senate	Stewart 50% - 48%
2020	President	Trump 52% - 46%
2020	Senate	Gade 53% - 47%
2021	Governor	Youngkin 58% - 41%
2021	Lt. Governor	Earle-Sears 58% - 42%
2021	Attorney General	Miyares 58% - 42%
2024	President	Trump 52% - 47%
2024	Senate	Cao 52% - 48%
2025	Governor	Spanberger 51% - 49%
2025	Lt. Governor	Reid 51% - 49%
2025	Attorney General	Miyares 54% - 46%

== Composition ==
For the 118th and successive Congresses (based on redistricting following the 2020 census), the district contains all or portions of the following counties and communities:

Chesterfield County (4)

Bon Air, Brandermill, Midlothian, Woodlake

Essex County (1)

Tappahannock

Gloucester County (2)

Gloucester Courthouse, Gloucester Point

Hanover County (3)

Ashland, Hanover, Mechanicsville

Henrico County (5)

Glen Allen (part; also 4th), Innsbrook, Short Pump, Tuckahoe, Wyndham

James City County (0)

No incorporated or census-recognized communities

King and Queen County (1)

King and Queen Court House

King William County (3)

All 3 communities

Lancaster County (5)

All 5 communities

Mathews County (2)

Gwynn, Mathews

Middlesex County (3)

All 3 communities

New Kent County (1)

New Kent

Northumberland County (1)

Heathsville, Kilmarnock (shared with Lancaster County)

Richmond County (1)

Warsaw

Westmoreland County (2)

Colonial Beach, Montross

York County (2)

Bethel Manor, Yorktown

Independent cities (2)

Poquoson, Williamsburg

== Historic district boundaries ==
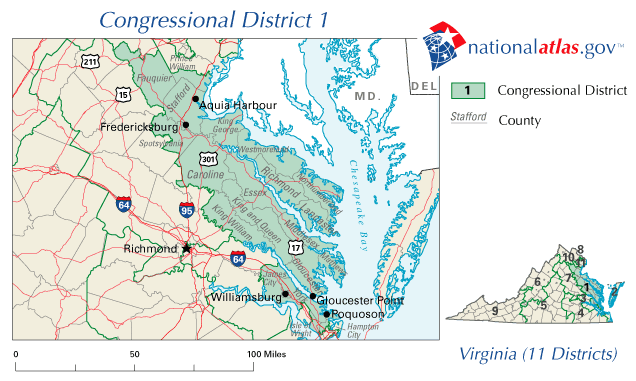
2003–2013

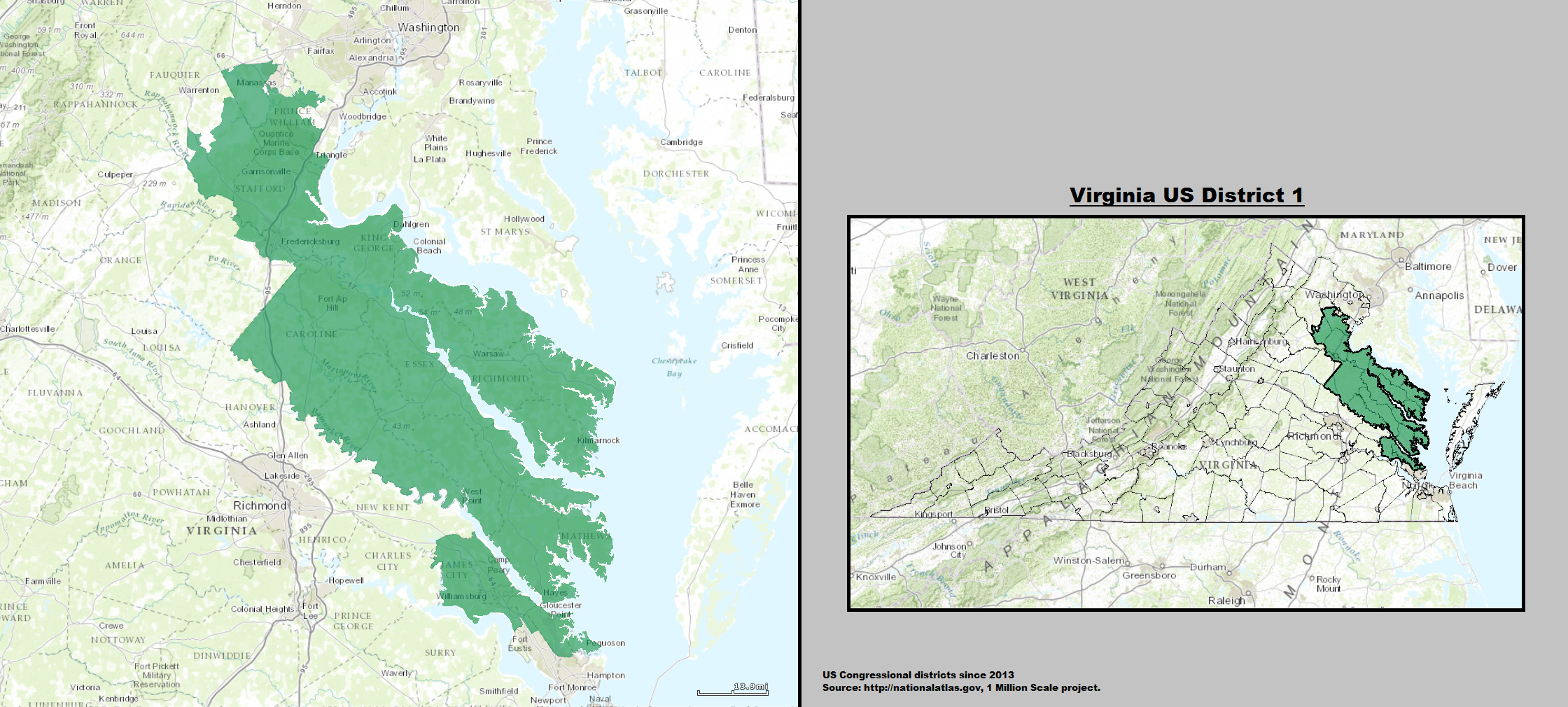
2013–2017

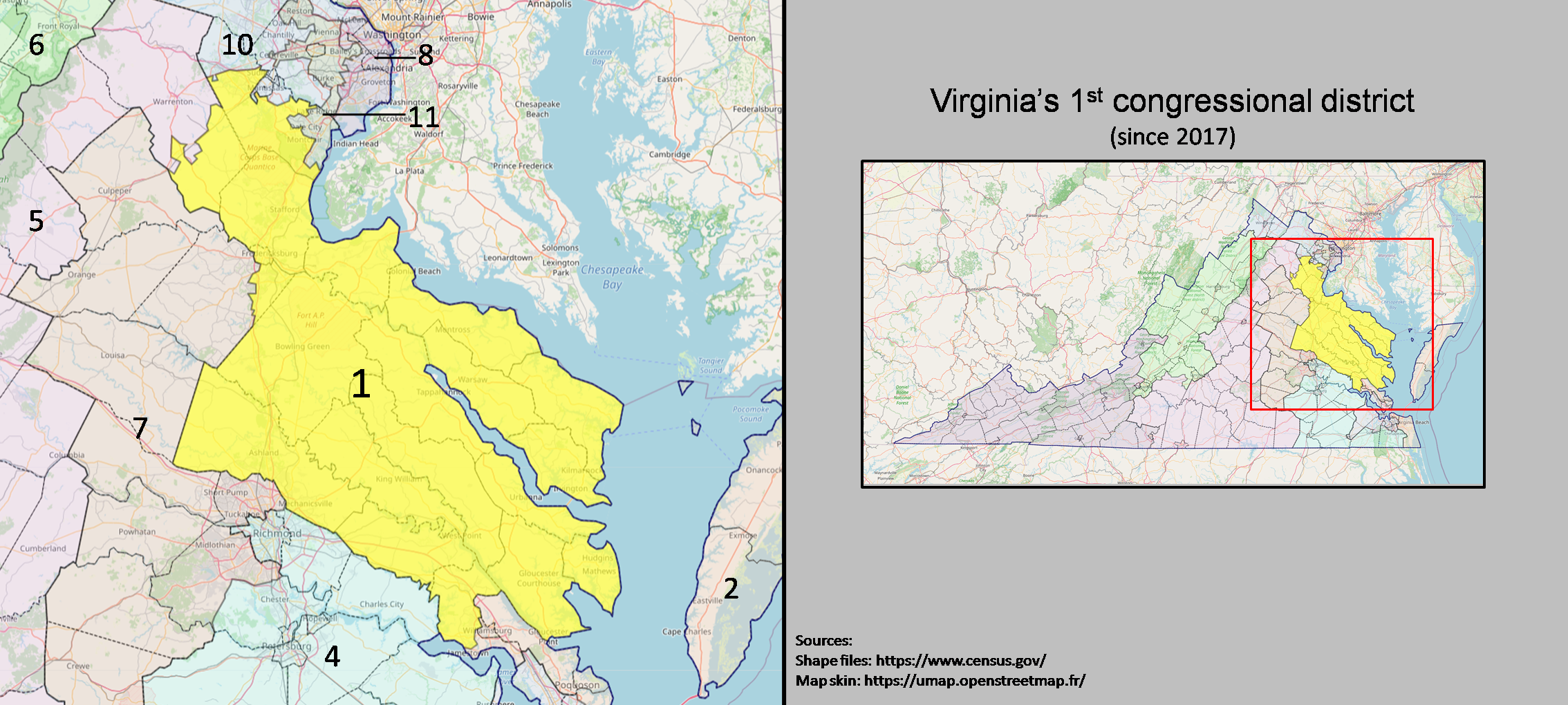
2017–2023

The Virginia First District started in 1788 covering the counties of Berkeley, Frederick, Hampshire, Hardy, Harrison, Monongalia, Ohio, Randolph and Shenandoah. Of these only Shenandoah and Frederick Counties are in Virginia today; the rest are now part of West Virginia. The modern counties of Clarke, Warren and most of Page as well as the independent city of Winchester were included as part of Frederick and Shenandoah counties in 1788. In West Virginia all the current state north and east of a generalized line running from Wood County to Pocahontas County was in the congressional district. The one exception was that Pendleton County, West Virginia was in Virginia's 3rd congressional district.

In the redistribution which followed the 1850 census (in force 1853–1863), the First District comprised sixteen counties in eastern Virginia. The counties included (amongst others) Accomack, Essex, Gloucester, James City, King and Queen, Mathews, Middlesex, New Kent, Richmond, Warwick and Westmoreland. In an 1862 Union special election three out of the sixteen counties in the Union district supplied returns.

The First District is noted for its strong presence of military institutions, including the Naval Surface Warfare Center. Increasing numbers of military and retired voters have swung the district to the right.

== Recent election results ==
2000 Virginia's 1st congressional district election
Party	Candidate	Votes	%
Republican	Jo Ann Davis	151,344	57.5
Democratic	Lawrence A. Davies	97,399	37.0
Independent	Sharon A. Wood	9,652	3.7
Independent	Josh Billings	4,082	1.6
Write-ins		537	0.2
Total votes		263,014	100.00
Republican hold			

2002 Virginia's 1st congressional district election
Party	Candidate	Votes	%
Republican	Jo Ann Davis (Incumbent)	113,168	95.9
Write-ins		4,829	4.1
Total votes		117,997	100.00
Republican hold			

2004 Virginia's 1st congressional district election
Party	Candidate	Votes	%
Republican	Jo Ann Davis (Incumbent)	225,071	78.6
Independent	William A. Lee	57,434	20.0
Write-ins		4,029	1.4
Total votes		286,534	100.00
Republican hold			

2006 Virginia's 1st congressional district election
Party	Candidate	Votes	%
Republican	Jo Ann Davis (Incumbent)	143,889	63.0
Democratic	Shawn M. O'Donnell	81,083	35.5
Independent	Marvin F. Pixton III	3,236	1.4
Write-ins		326	0.1
Total votes		228,534	100.00
Republican hold			

2007 Virginia's 1st congressional district special election
Party	Candidate	Votes	%
Republican	Rob Wittman	42,772	60.8
Democratic	Philip Forgit	26,282	37.3
Independent	Lucky R. Narain	1,253	1.8
Write-ins		75	0.1
Total votes		70,382	100.00
Republican hold			

2008 Virginia's 1st congressional district election
Party	Candidate	Votes	%
Republican	Rob Wittman (Incumbent)	203,839	56.6
Democratic	Bill Day	150,432	41.8
Libertarian	Nathan Larson	5,265	1.5
Write-in		756	0.2
Total votes		360,292	100
Republican hold			

2010 Virginia's 1st congressional district election
Party	Candidate	Votes	%
Republican	Rob Wittman (Incumbent)	135,564	63.9
Democratic	Krystal M. Ball	73,824	34.8
Independent Greens	G. Gail Parker	2,544	1.2
Write-in		304	0.1
Total votes		212,236	100
Republican hold			

2012 Virginia's 1st congressional district election
Party	Candidate	Votes	%
Republican	Rob Wittman (Incumbent)	200,845	56.3
Democratic	Adam M. Cook	147,036	41.2
Independent Greens	G. Gail Parker	8,308	2.3
Write-in		617	0.2
Total votes		356,806	100
Republican hold			

2014 Virginia's 1st congressional district election
Party	Candidate	Votes	%
Republican	Rob Wittman (Incumbent)	131,851	62.9
Democratic	Norm Mosher	72,054	34.4
Independent Greens	G. Gail Parker	5,097	2.4
Write-in		604	0.3
Total votes		209,606	100
Republican hold			

2016 Virginia's 1st congressional district election
Party	Candidate	Votes	%
Republican	Rob Wittman (Incumbent)	230,213	59.86
Democratic	Matt Rowe	140,785	36.61
Independent	Glenda Parker	12,866	3.35
	Write-in	737	0.19
Total votes		384,601	100.00
Republican hold			

2018 Virginia's 1st congressional district election
Party	Candidate	Votes	%
Republican	Rob Wittman (Incumbent)	183,250	55.18
Democratic	Vangie Williams	148,464	44.70
	Write-in	387	0.12
Total votes		332,101	100.00
Republican hold			

2020 Virginia's 1st congressional district election
Party	Candidate	Votes	%
Republican	Rob Wittman (Incumbent)	260,706	58.2
Democratic	Qasim Rashid	186,927	41.8
Total votes		447,633	97.00
Republican hold			

2022 Virginia's 1st congressional district election
Party	Candidate	Votes	%
Republican	Rob Wittman (Incumbent)	191,828	56.0
Democratic	Herb Jones	147,229	43.0
Independent	David Foster	3,388	1.0
Write-in		297	0.1
Total votes		342,742	100.00
Republican hold			

2024 Virginia's 1st congressional district election
Party	Candidate	Votes	%
Republican	Rob Wittman (incumbent)	269,657	56.3
Democratic	Leslie Mehta	208,445	43.5
Write-in		804	0.2
Total votes		478,906	100.0
Republican hold			

== List of members representing the district ==
Representative	Party	Years	Cong ress	Electoral history
District established March 4, 1789
Alexander White (Woodville)	Pro-Administration	March 4, 1789 – March 3, 1793	1st 2nd	Elected in 1789. Re-elected in 1790. Lost re-election.
Robert Rutherford (Charles Town)	Anti-Administration	March 4, 1793 – March 3, 1795	3rd 4th	Elected in 1793. Re-elected in 1795. Lost re-election.
Robert Rutherford (Charles Town)	Democratic-Republican	March 4, 1795 – March 3, 1797	3rd 4th	Elected in 1793. Re-elected in 1795. Lost re-election.
Daniel Morgan (Winchester)	Federalist	March 4, 1797 – March 3, 1799	5th	Elected in 1797. Retired.
Robert Page (Frederick County)	Federalist	March 4, 1799 – March 3, 1801	6th	Elected in 1799. Retired.
John Smith (Hackwood)	Democratic-Republican	March 4, 1801 – March 3, 1803	7th	Elected in 1801. Redistricted to the 3rd district.
John G. Jackson (Clarksburg)	Democratic-Republican	March 4, 1803 – September 28, 1810	8th 9th 10th 11th	Elected in 1803. Re-elected in 1805. Re-elected in 1807. Re-elected in 1809. Resigned.
Vacant		September 29, 1810 – December 20, 1810	11th	
William McKinley (Ohio County)	Democratic-Republican	December 21, 1810 – March 3, 1811	11th	Elected in to finish Jackson's term. Lost re-election.
Thomas Wilson (Morgantown)	Federalist	March 4, 1811 – March 3, 1813	12th	Elected in 1811. Lost re-election.
John G. Jackson (Clarksburg)	Democratic-Republican	March 4, 1813 – March 3, 1817	13th 14th	Elected in 1813. Re-elected in 1815. Retired.
James Pindall (Clarksburg)	Federalist	March 4, 1817 – July 26, 1820	15th 16th	Elected in 1817. Re-elected in 1819. Resigned.
Vacant		July 27, 1820 – October 22, 1820	16th	
Edward B. Jackson (Clarksburg)	Democratic-Republican	October 23, 1820 – March 3, 1823	16th 17th	Elected to finish Pindall's term. Re-elected in 1821. Retired.
Thomas Newton Jr. (Norfolk)	Democratic-Republican	March 4, 1823 – March 3, 1825	18th 19th 20th 21st	Redistricted from the 21st district and re-elected in 1823. Re-elected in 1825. Re-elected in 1827. Election invalidated.
Thomas Newton Jr. (Norfolk)	Anti-Jacksonian	March 4, 1825 – March 9, 1830	18th 19th 20th 21st	Redistricted from the 21st district and re-elected in 1823. Re-elected in 1825. Re-elected in 1827. Election invalidated.
George Loyall (Norfolk)	Jackson	March 9, 1830 – March 3, 1831	21st	Won election contest. Lost re-election.
Thomas Newton Jr. (Norfolk)	Anti-Jacksonian	March 4, 1831 – March 3, 1833	22nd	Elected in 1831. Retired.
George Loyall (Norfolk)	Jackson	March 4, 1833 – March 3, 1837	23rd 24th	Elected in 1833. Re-elected in 1835. Retired.
Francis Mallory (Hampton)	Whig	March 4, 1837 – March 3, 1839	25th	Elected in 1837. Lost re-election.
Joel Holleman (Burwell Bay)	Democratic	March 4, 1839 – December 1, 1840	26th	Elected in 1839. Resigned.
Vacant		December 2, 1840 – December 27, 1840	26th	
Francis Mallory (Hampton)	Whig	December 28, 1840 – March 3, 1843	26th 27th	Elected to finish Holleman's term. Re-elected in 1841. Retired.
Archibald Atkinson (Smithfield)	Democratic	March 4, 1843 – March 3, 1849	28th 29th 30th	Elected in 1843. Re-elected in 1845. Re-elected in 1847. Retired.
John S. Millson (Norfolk)	Democratic	March 4, 1849 – March 3, 1853	31st 32nd	Elected in 1849. Re-elected in 1851. Redistricted to the 2nd district.
Thomas H. Bayly (Accomac)	Democratic	March 4, 1853 – June 23, 1856	33rd 34th	Elected in 1853. Re-elected in 1855. Died.
Vacant		June 24, 1856 – November 30, 1856	34th	
Muscoe R. H. Garnett (Loretto)	Democratic	December 1, 1856 – March 3, 1861	34th 35th 36th	Elected to finish Bayly's term. Re-elected in 1857. Re-elected in 1859. Retired.
Vacant		March 4, 1861 – October 24, 1861	37th	
Joseph E. Segar (Elizabeth City)	Unionist	October 24, 1861 – February 11, 1862	37th	Elected in 1861. Declared by the House to be not entitled to the seat.
Vacant		February 11, 1862 – March 16, 1862	37th	
Joseph E. Segar (Elizabeth City)	Unionist	March 16, 1862 – May 17, 1864	37th 38th	Elected to finish his own term. Re-elected in 1863. Declared by the House to be not entitled to the seat.
District inactive		May 17, 1864 – January 30, 1870	38th 39th 40th 41st	Civil War and Reconstruction
Richard S. Ayer (Warsaw)	Republican	January 31, 1870 – March 3, 1871	41st	Elected to finish the short term. Retired.
John Critcher (Oak Grove)	Democratic	March 4, 1871 – March 3, 1873	42nd	Elected in 1870. Retired.
James B. Sener (Fredericksburg)	Republican	March 4, 1873 – March 3, 1875	43rd	Elected in 1872. Lost re-election.
Beverly B. Douglas (Aylett)	Democratic	March 4, 1875 – December 22, 1878	44th 45th	Elected in 1874. Re-elected in 1876. Re-elected in 1878, but died before his term began.
Vacant		December 23, 1878 – January 22, 1879	45th	
Richard L. T. Beale (Hague)	Democratic	January 23, 1879 – March 3, 1881	45th 46th	Elected to finish Douglas's term. Retired.
George T. Garrison (Accomac)	Democratic	March 4, 1881 – March 3, 1883	47th	Elected in 1880. Lost re-election.
Robert M. Mayo (Hague)	Readjuster	March 4, 1883 – March 20, 1884	48th	Elected in 1882. Election invalidated.
George T. Garrison (Accomac)	Democratic	March 20, 1884 – March 3, 1885	48th	[data missing] Retired.
Thomas Croxton (Tappahannock)	Democratic	March 4, 1885 – March 3, 1887	49th	Elected in 1884. Lost re-election.
Thomas H. B. Browne (Accomac)	Republican	March 4, 1887 – March 3, 1891	50th 51st	Elected in 1886. Re-elected in 1888. Lost re-election.
William A. Jones (Warsaw)	Democratic	March 4, 1891 – April 17, 1918	52nd 53rd 54th 55th 56th 57th 58th 59th 60th 61st 62nd 63rd 64th 65th	Elected in 1890. Re-elected in 1892. Re-elected in 1894. Re-elected in 1896. Re-elected in 1898. Re-elected in 1900. Re-elected in 1902. Re-elected in 1904. Re-elected in 1906. Re-elected in 1908. Re-elected in 1910. Re-elected in 1912. Re-elected in 1914. Re-elected in 1916. Died.
Vacant		April 18, 1918 – July 2, 1918	65th	
S. Otis Bland (Newport News)	Democratic	July 2, 1918 – March 3, 1933	65th 66th 67th 68th 69th 70th 71st 72nd	Elected to finish Jones's term. Re-elected in 1918. Re-elected in 1920. Re-elected in 1922. Re-elected in 1924. Re-elected in 1926. Re-elected in 1928. Re-elected in 1930. Redistricted to the at-large seat.
District inactive		March 4, 1933 – January 3, 1935	73rd	
S. Otis Bland (Newport News)	Democratic	January 3, 1935 – February 16, 1950	74th 75th 76th 77th 78th 79th 80th 81st	Elected in 1934. Re-elected in 1936. Re-elected in 1938. Re-elected in 1940. Re-elected in 1942. Re-elected in 1944. Re-elected in 1946. Re-elected in 1948. Died.
Vacant		February 16, 1950 – May 2, 1950	81st	
Edward J. Robeson Jr. (Warwick)	Democratic	May 2, 1950 – January 3, 1959	81st 82nd 83rd 84th 85th	Elected to finish Bland's term. Re-elected in 1950. Re-elected in 1952. Re-elected in 1954. Re-elected in 1956. Lost renomination.
Thomas N. Downing (Newport News)	Democratic	January 3, 1959 – January 3, 1977	86th 87th 88th 89th 90th 91st 92nd 93rd 94th	Elected in 1958. Re-elected in 1960. Re-elected in 1962. Re-elected in 1964. Re-elected in 1966. Re-elected in 1968. Re-elected in 1970. Re-elected in 1972. Re-elected in 1974. Retired.
Paul Trible (Newport News)	Republican	January 3, 1977 – January 3, 1983	95th 96th 97th	Elected in 1976. Re-elected in 1978. Re-elected in 1980. Retired to run for U.S. senator.
Herbert H. Bateman (Newport News)	Republican	January 3, 1983 – September 11, 2000	98th 99th 100th 101st 102nd 103rd 104th 105th 106th	Elected in 1982. Re-elected in 1984. Re-elected in 1986. Re-elected in 1988. Re-elected in 1990. Re-elected in 1992. Re-elected in 1994. Re-elected in 1996. Re-elected in 1998. Announced retirement, then died.
Vacant		September 11, 2000 – January 3, 2001	106th	
Jo Ann Davis (Gloucester)	Republican	January 3, 2001 – October 6, 2007	107th 108th 109th 110th	Elected in 2000. Re-elected in 2002. Re-elected in 2004. Re-elected in 2006. Died.
Vacant		October 6, 2007 – December 11, 2007	110th	
Rob Wittman (Montross)	Republican	December 11, 2007 – present	110th 111th 112th 113th 114th 115th 116th 117th 118th 119th	Elected to finish Davis's term. Re-elected in 2008. Re-elected in 2010. Re-elected in 2012. Re-elected in 2014. Re-elected in 2016. Re-elected in 2018. Re-elected in 2020. Re-elected in 2022. Re-elected in 2024. Lost re-election.
Shannon Taylor (Midlothian)	Democratic	Assuming office on January 3, 2027		Elected in 2026.

== See also ==
- Virginia's congressional districts
- List of United States congressional districts
- 2007 Virginia's 1st congressional district special election
