= Richard L. T. Beale =

American politician

Richard Lee Turberville Beale
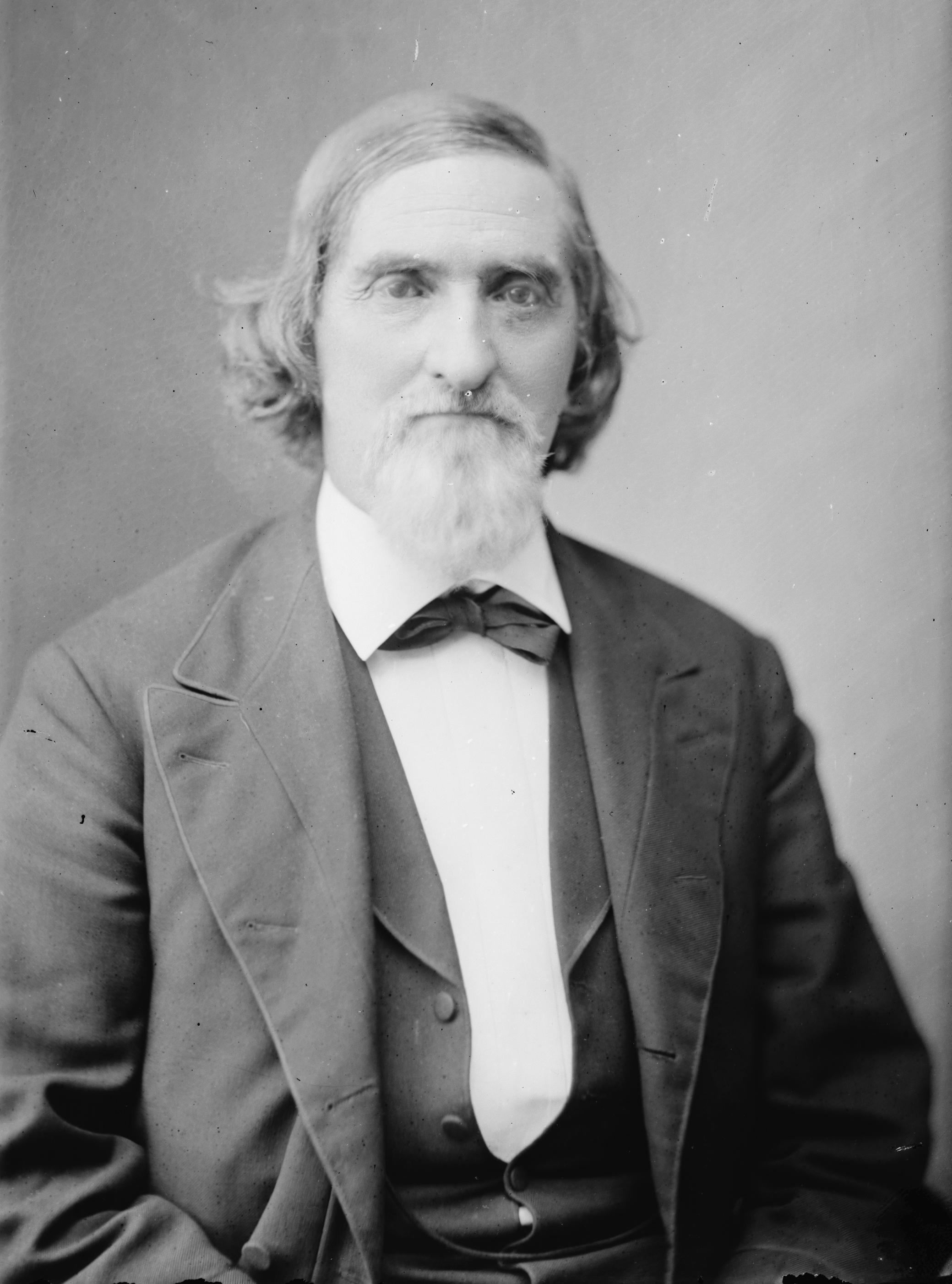

Member of the U.S. House of Representatives from Virginia's 1st district
- In office January 23, 1879 – March 4, 1881
- Preceded by: Beverly B. Douglas
- Succeeded by: George T. Garrison

Member of the U.S. House of Representatives from Virginia's 8th district
- In office March 4, 1847 – March 4, 1849
- Preceded by: Robert M.T. Hunter
- Succeeded by: Alexander Holladay

Member of the Virginia Senate from Westmoreland, Richmond, Lancaster and Northumberland Counties
- In office 1858–1860
- Preceded by: Elliott Braxton
- Succeeded by: John Critcher

Personal details
- Born: May 22, 1819 'Hickory Hill', Hague, Virginia
- Died: April 21, 1893 (aged 73) 'Hickory Hill', Hague, Virginia
- Party: Democratic
- Profession: Politician, Lawyer

Military service
- Allegiance: Confederate States of America
- Branch/service: Confederate States Army
- Years of service: 1861 – 1865
- Rank: Brigadier General
- Unit: 9th Virginia Cavalry, Army of Northern Virginia
- Battles/wars: American Civil War; Peninsula Campaign; Gettysburg campaign Battle of Brandy Station; Battle of Gettysburg; Battle of Culpeper Court House; Bristoe Campaign; Mine Run Campaign; Siege of Petersburg; Second Battle of Ream's Station

Richard Lee Turberville Beale (May 22, 1819 – April 21, 1893) was a lawyer, three-term United States Congressman from the Commonwealth of Virginia, and a brigadier general in the Confederate States Army during the American Civil War. He had more than three dozen slaves and was a Democrat.

== Early life and career ==
Beale was born at Hickory Hill, Westmoreland County, Virginia. He attended two local private schools, Northumberland Academy and Rappahannock Academy, before attending Dickinson College in Carlisle, Pennsylvania. He studied law and graduated from the University of Virginia in 1837. Two years later, he was admitted to the bar and established a law practice at Hague, Virginia.

Beale was elected as a Democrat to the Thirtieth Congress (March 4, 1847 – March 3, 1849). However, he declined to be a candidate for renomination in 1848. He served as a member of the Virginia constitutional reform convention in 1850–51 where he opposed constitutional reform as a member of the ruling Richmond Junta, and he was elected to the Virginia Senate serving from 1858 to 1860.

Beale owned thirty-eight slaves along with significant farmland.

== Civil War ==
Upon the secession of Virginia in 1861, Beale accepted a commission in the cavalry as a lieutenant in the 9th Virginia Cavalry. He was soon promoted to captain and then major, and placed in command of Camp Lee, near his hometown of Hague, on the lower Potomac River. Being commended for his intelligence and excellent judgment, he subsequently served under Col. W. H. F. "Rooney" Lee in the 9th Virginia Cavalry in what became the Army of Northern Virginia. When Lee was promoted to brigadier general, Beale was advanced to the rank of colonel on September 15, 1862 and given command of the regiment, which included his sons. In December 1862, he led a bold expedition throughout the countryside near the Rappahannock River, capturing the Federal garrison at Leeds without losing a man.

Beale's service in 1863 earned him several written commendations and praises. On April 16, he won the praise of Maj. Gen. J.E.B. Stuart for repelling the threatened raid of Maj. Gen. George Stoneman's Federal cavalry division, capturing several prisoners during a week of nearly continual fighting. During the Gettysburg campaign, Beale led the 9th Virginia in a charge on Fleetwood Hill at the Battle of Brandy Station in June. He participated in Stuart's subsequent ride around the Army of the Potomac and the raid through Maryland and Pennsylvania. He participated in hard fighting at Gettysburg's East Cavalry Field in early July and during the army's retreat to Virginia. He briefly assumed command of Rooney Lee's brigade during fighting at Culpeper Court House and participated in the Bristoe and Mine Run Campaigns.

In March 1864, he made a forced march to intercept Union Col. Ulric Dahlgren and his raiders. A detachment of his 9th Virginia Cavalry successfully ambushed the Federals, and, with other units, captured about 175 men and killed Dahlgren. The papers found upon Dahlgren's person, revealing a design to burn Richmond and kill President Jefferson Davis and his Cabinet, were forwarded through Maj. Gen. Fitzhugh Lee to the Confederate government. These controversial papers discovered by Beale's troopers may have been a factor that influenced John Wilkes Booth in his decision to assassinate Abraham Lincoln.

Beale led his regiment during the Overland Campaign, and captured two Union flags at the Second Battle of Ream's Station during the Siege of Petersburg. In August, upon the death of John R. Chambliss, Beale was assigned to command of Chambliss's brigade, although still with the rank of colonel. It was not until February 6, 1865, that he was finally promoted to brigadier general. He led the brigade through the end of the war. He was wounded and captured at Appomattox Station on April 9, 1865, and was paroled on April 27 at Ashland.

== Postbellum activities ==
After the war, Beale resumed his political career during Reconstruction. He was elected to the Forty-fifth Congress to fill the vacancy caused by the death of Beverly B. Douglas. He was reelected and served in the Forty-sixth Congress from January 23, 1879 to March 3, 1881. Finally retiring from public service, Beale resumed the practice of law. He also wrote A History of the Ninth Virginia Cavalry in the War Between the States.

Beale died near Hague, Virginia, and was buried there at Hickory Hill Cemetery.

== Elections ==
- 1847; Beale was first elected to the U.S. House of Representatives from Virginia's 8th District with 51.86% of the vote, defeating Whig Willoughby Newton.
- 1855; Beale lost election to the U.S. House of Representatives from Virginia's 1st District, defeated by Democrat Thomas Henry Bayly.
- 1878; Beale was elected to the U.S. House of Representatives from Virginia's 1st District with 48.32% of the vote, defeating Republican George C. Round and Independent Democrat John Critcher.
- 1879; Beale won a special election with 75.84% of the vote, defeating Republican U.W. Douglas and Independents George C. Round and John W. Parker.

== Bibliography ==
- Beale, Richard L.T. (1899). History of the Ninth Virginia Cavalry, in the War Between the States. Richmond, VA: B.F. Johnson Publishing Company.

== See also ==
- List of American Civil War generals (Confederate)

== Notes ==
U.S. House of Representatives
Preceded by Robert M. T. Hunter	Member of the U.S. House of Representatives from Virginia's 8th congressional district 1847–1849	Succeeded by Alexander Holladay
Preceded by Beverly B. Douglas	Member of the U.S. House of Representatives from Virginia's 1st congressional district 1879–1881	Succeeded by George T. Garrison
