= Edward B. Jackson =

American politician

Member of the U.S. House of Representatives from Virginia's 1st district
- In office October 23, 1820 – March 3, 1823
- Preceded by: James Pindall
- Succeeded by: Thomas Newton, Jr.

Member of the Virginia House of Delegates from Harrison County
- In office 1815–1817; Alongside Joseph Johnson, John McWhorter John Davisson

Personal details
- Born: Edward Brake Jackson; January 25, 1793 Clarksburg, Virginia
- Died: September 8, 1826 (aged 33) Bedford Springs, near Bedford, Pennsylvania
- Party: Democratic-Republican

Military service
- Branch/service: Virginia Militia
- Rank: Civilian serving as surgeon's mate
- Unit: 3rd Regular
- Battles/wars: War of 1812

Edward Brake Jackson (January 25, 1793 – September 8, 1826) was a U.S. representative from Virginia, son of George Jackson and brother of John G. Jackson.

== Biography ==
Born in Clarksburg, Virginia (now West Virginia), Jackson attended Randolph Academy at Clarksburg. He studied medicine and commenced practice in Clarksburg. During the War of 1812 he was assigned as a surgeon's mate, Third Regular Virginia Militia, at Fort Meigs, Ohio. He served as a member of the State house of delegates 1815–1818. He served as clerk of the United States district court in 1819.

Jackson was elected as a Democratic-Republican to the Sixteenth Congress to fill the vacancy caused by the resignation of James Pindall and reelected to the Seventeenth Congress and served from October 23, 1820, to March 3, 1823. He declined to be a candidate for renomination in 1822. He died at Bedford Springs, near Bedford, Pennsylvania, September 8, 1826. He was interred near Bedford, Pennsylvania.

== Electoral history ==
1821; Jackson won election with 75.22% of the vote, defeating Federalist Thomas Wilson.

== Sources ==
- United States Congress. "Edward B. Jackson (id: J000010)". Biographical Directory of the United States Congress.

U.S. House of Representatives
Preceded by James Pindall	Member of the U.S. House of Representatives from Virginia's 1st congressional district 1820–1823	Succeeded by Thomas Newton, Jr.
