= George Loyall =

American politician

Member of the U.S. House of Representatives from Virginia's 1st district
- In office March 4, 1833 – March 3, 1837
- Preceded by: Thomas Newton, Jr.
- Succeeded by: Francis Mallory
- In office March 9, 1830 – March 3, 1831
- Preceded by: Thomas Newton, Jr.
- Succeeded by: Thomas Newton, Jr.

Member of the Virginia House of Delegates from Norfolk Borough
- In office 1817–1826
- Preceded by: Littleton Tazewell
- Succeeded by: Albert Allmand

Personal details
- Born: May 29, 1789 Norfolk, Virginia
- Died: February 24, 1868 (aged 78) Norfolk, Virginia
- Party: Jacksonian
- Education: College of William and Mary
- Profession: politician

George Loyall (May 29, 1789 – February 24, 1868) was a U.S. representative from Virginia.

== Biography ==
Born in Norfolk, Virginia, Loyall was graduated from the College of William and Mary, Williamsburg, Virginia, in 1808. He studied law but did not practice. Visited England in 1815. He served as member of the State house of delegates 1818-1827. He served as delegate to the State constitutional convention in 1829. He successfully contested the election of Thomas Newton to the Twenty-first Congress and served from March 9, 1830, to March 3, 1831.

Loyall was elected as a Jacksonian to the Twenty-third and Twenty-fourth Congresses (March 4, 1833 – March 3, 1837). Navy agent at Norfolk, Virginia from 1837 to 1861, with the exception of two years. He died in Norfolk, Virginia, February 24, 1868. He was interred in Elmwood Cemetery.

== Electoral history ==
- 1829; Loyall lost the election to Republican Thomas Newton but the election was invalidated and Loyall was seated.
- 1831; Loyall lost his re-election bid to Newton, winning only 48.99% of the vote.
- 1833; Loyall won re-election with 53.03% of the vote, defeating Miles King Jr.
- 1835; Loyall won re-election with 52.49% of the vote, defeating Whig Arthur Emmerson.

== Sources ==
- United States Congress. "George Loyall (id: L000488)". Biographical Directory of the United States Congress.

U.S. House of Representatives
Preceded by Thomas Newton, Jr.	Member of the U.S. House of Representatives from Virginia's 1st congressional district 1830–1831	Succeeded by Thomas Newton, Jr.
Preceded by Thomas Newton, Jr.	Member of the U.S. House of Representatives from Virginia's 1st congressional district 1833–1837	Succeeded by Francis Mallory
