= 9th Virginia Cavalry Regiment =

- Flag of Virginia, 1861
- Active: January 1862 – April 1865
- Disbanded: April 1865
- Country: Confederate States of America
- Allegiance: Virginia
- Branch: Confederate States Army
- Role: Cavalry
- Nickname(s): Johnson's Cavalry
- Engagements: First Battle of Manassas; Peninsula Campaign; Seven Days' Battles; Second Battle of Bull Run; Battle of Antietam; Battle of Fredericksburg; Battle of Chancellorsville; Battle of Brandy Station; Battle of Gettysburg; Bristoe Campaign; Overland Campaign; Siege of Petersburg; Valley Campaigns of 1864; Appomattox Campaign; Battle of Five Forks

Commanders
- Notable commanders: Colonel W.H.F. "Rooney" Lee; Colonel Richard L. T. Beale

The 9th Virginia Cavalry Regiment was a cavalry regiment raised in Virginia for service in the Confederate States Army during the American Civil War. It fought mostly with the Army of Northern Virginia.

== History ==
Virginia’s 9th Cavalry Regiment was formed in January, 1862, using John E. Johnson's eight company 1st Battalion, Virginia Cavalry ("Lee's Legion") as its nucleus. These companies and the two added were from the counties of Stafford, Caroline, Westmoreland, Lancaster, Essex, Spotsylvania, Lunenburg, King William, King George, and Richmond.

The unit served in W.H.F. Lee's, Chambliss', and Beale's Brigade, Army of Northern Virginia. It fought in the Seven Days' Battles and the conflicts at Gainesville, Second Manassas, Sharpsburg, Fredericksburg, Dumfries, Rapidan Station, Brandy Station, Upperville, Hanover, Gettysburg, Williamsport, Funkstown, and Culpeper Court House. The 9th went on to fight at Bristoe, Mine Run, The Wilderness, and Todd's Tavern. Later it skirmished around Richmond and Petersburg, then was active in the Appomattox operations.

This unit reported 32 casualties at Upperville, lost four percent of the 490 engaged at Gettysburg, and had 22 disabled at Williamsport. It surrendered 1 officer and 26 men. The field officers were Colonels Richard L. T. Beale, John E. Johnson, W.H.F. "Rooney" Lee, and Thomas Waller; Lieutenant Colonel Meriwether Lewis; and Major Samuel A. Swann.

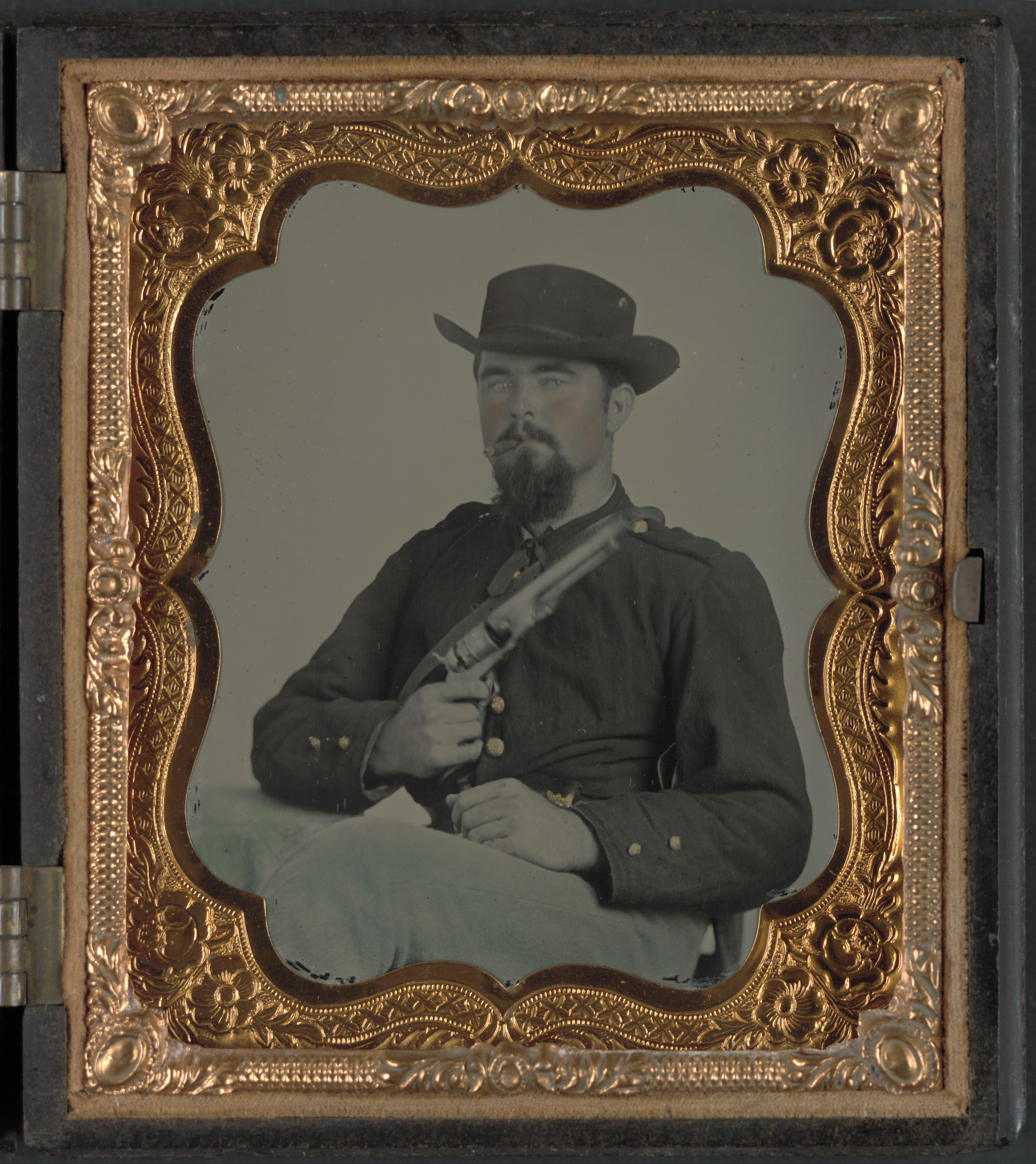
Private William B. Todd of Company E, 9th Virginia Cavalry Regiment

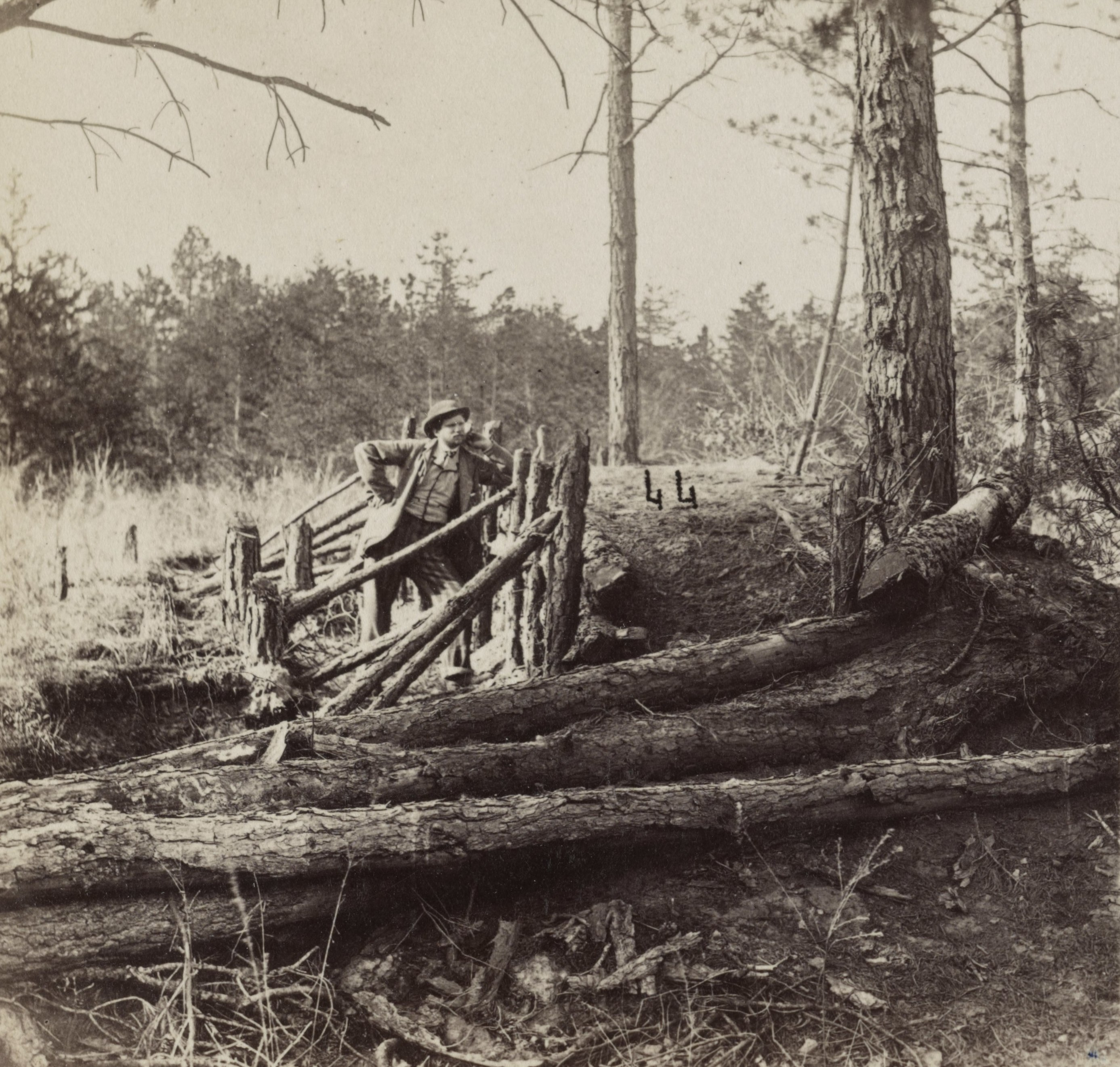
Lt George Chancellor Co E 9th Virginia Cavalry on the Wilderness Battlefield, standing at some Confederate breastworks near Palmer's field on the Orange Turnpike.

== See also ==
- List of Virginia Civil War units
