= James Pindall =

American politician

Member of the U.S. House of Representatives from Virginia's 1st district
- In office March 4, 1817 – July 26, 1820
- Preceded by: John G. Jackson
- Succeeded by: Edward B. Jackson

Member of the Virginia Senate from Monongalia, Ohio, Harrison, Wood, Brooke and Randolph Counties
- In office 1809–1811
- Preceded by: Philip Doddridge (1807)
- Succeeded by: Noah Zane

Personal details
- Born: c. 1783 Monongalia County, Virginia (now West Virginia)
- Died: November 22, 1825 (aged 41–42) Clarksburg, Virginia (now West Virginia)
- Resting place: Clarksburg, West Virginia
- Party: Federalist
- Profession: lawyer

Military service
- Branch/service: Virginia Militia
- Rank: Colonel

James Pindall (c. 1783 – November 22, 1825) was a U.S. representative from Virginia.

Born in Monongalia County, Virginia (now West Virginia), Pindall attended the common schools. After studying law, he was admitted to the bar in 1803 and practiced in Morgantown. Later, he moved to Clarksburg and continued the practice of his profession. Over his lifetime, he held various official positions including serving in the Virginia Senate 1808–1812, being a colonel of militia, as well as, being elected as a Federalist to the Fifteenth and Sixteenth Congresses and served from March 4, 1817, until his resignation on July 26, 1820. He died in Clarksburg, Virginia (now West Virginia), November 22, 1825 and was interred in what was known as the Daniel Davisson burial ground in Clarksburg, West Virginia.

== See also ==
- Xenophon Jacob Pindall
- Xenophon Overton Pindall

== Sources ==
- United States Congress. "James Pindall (id: P000358)". Biographical Directory of the United States Congress.

U.S. House of Representatives
Preceded by John G. Jackson	Member of the U.S. House of Representatives from Virginia's 1st congressional district 1817–1820	Succeeded by Edward B. Jackson
