= Xenophon Jacob Pindall =

Arkansas state legislator and lawyer

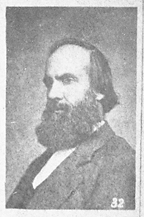
Xenophon Jacob Pindall, 1877 Arkansas Senate

Xenophon Jacob Pindall Sr. (August 13, 1835 – April 14, 1905) was a lawyer, state legislator, and judge in Arkansas. He was a lieutenant colonel in the Missouri State Guard during the American Civil War.

He was born in Virginia (area that is now (Monongalia County, West Virginia). He lived in Missouri where he moved with his father. L. A. Pindall was his older brother. He served in the Arkansas House of Representatives in 1873-1874 and represented Chicot County and Desha County in the Arkansas Senate from 1875 to 1878. He was elected as a delegate to the 1874 Arkansas Constitutional Convention (Arkansas Constitution).

He testified about the election of S. W. Dorsey in 1876.

Five children survived him.

== See also ==
- Xenophon, of ancient Greece
- James Pindall
- Xenophon Overton Pindall, politician in Arkansas
