= Jesse M. Martin =

Former Acting Governor of Arkansas

Jesse Martin
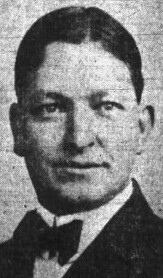

Acting Governor of Arkansas
- In office January 11, 1909 – January 14, 1909
- Preceded by: Xenophon Overton Pindall (acting)
- Succeeded by: George Washington Donaghey

Personal details
- Born: March 1, 1877 near London, Arkansas, U.S.
- Died: January 22, 1915 (aged 37) Mineral Wells, Texas, U.S.
- Party: Democratic

Jesse M. Martin (March 1, 1877 – January 22, 1915) was best known as the acting governor of Arkansas from January 11, 1909, to January 14, 1909. Senator Martin served as Acting Governor of Arkansas for three days until the inauguration of Governor George W. Donaghey.

Martin became acting governor after the expiration of the state senate term of Xenophon Overton Pindall. Pindall had served as acting governor during the unexpired term of John Sebastian Little when Little was unable to serve due to physical and mental illness.

== Background ==
Jesse M. Martin was born the fifth of eleven children on a farm near London, Arkansas to Jasper J., a farmer, and Martha (née Johnson) Martin. Jesse helped his father on the farm but also taught school after completing his own education. At age 22, he was a law student at Hendrix College and later University of Arkansas. After graduating, he was the circuit of clerk for Pope County for four years. Afterwards, he was admitted to the Arkansas Bar Association and became a partner in the firm Brooks, Hays & Martin. Martin started his political career in 1909 when he was elected to represent his district and was re-elected in 1909. After this term, he was president of the Arkansas State Senate and afterwards lieutenant governor of Arkansas. In 1909, he was Governor of Arkansas for three days until George Washington Donaghey was elected. In 1902, he married Mollie Ferguson and they had one son, Ferguson (born 1905).

== See also ==
- List of governors of Arkansas

Political offices
Preceded by Xenophon Overton Pindall; Acting Governor	Acting Governor of Arkansas; 1909	Succeeded by George Washington Donaghey; Governor
