= Xenophon Overton Pindall =

Former acting governor of Arkansas

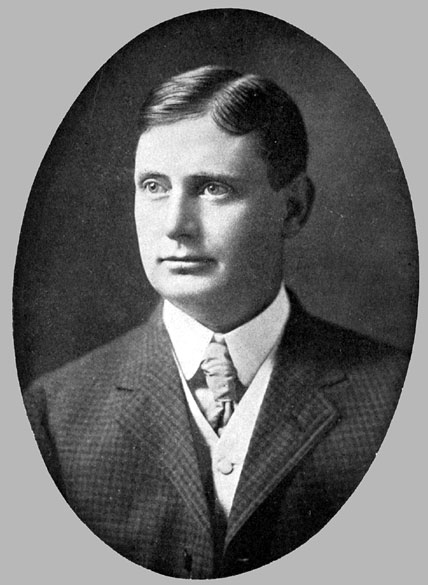
- Pindall, c. 1908

Acting Governor of Arkansas
- In office May 14, 1907 – January 11, 1909
- Preceded by: John Isaac Moore (acting)
- Succeeded by: Jesse M. Martin (acting)

Member of the Arkansas Senate
- In office 1907–1909

Member of the Arkansas House of Representatives
- In office 1902–1906

Personal details
- Born: August 21, 1873 Middle Grove, Missouri, U.S.
- Died: January 2, 1935 (aged 61) Little Rock, Arkansas, U.S.
- Party: Democratic
- Education: University of Arkansas; University of Arkansas School of Law
- Profession: Attorney

Xenophon Overton Pindall (August 21, 1873 – January 2, 1935) was a member of the Arkansas House of Representatives, Arkansas State Senate and the acting governor of Arkansas.

== Early life ==
Pindall was born at Middle Grove in Monroe County, Missouri. He attended Central College in Missouri and earned his law degree from the University of Arkansas in 1896. He was a member of Kappa Sigma, Xi chapter at the University of Arkansas. Contemporaries of Pindall at Xi Chapter included future Arkansas Governor and Federal Judge John Ellis Martineau, future acting Governor Michael Pleasant Huddleston, future Federal Judge Thomas Clark Trimble III, and future Congressman and Federal Judge Samuel Billingsley Hill.

== Career ==
Pindall served as a member of the Arkansas House of Representatives from 1902 to 1906. He ran unsuccessfully for the post of Arkansas Attorney General in 1906 and later that year was elected to the Arkansas State Senate.

On February 11, 1907, Arkansas Governor John Sebastian Little resigned his office due to mental and physical illness. John Isaac Moore was president of the Senate and replaced him as governor. At the end of the legislative session in May, Pindall was chosen as the new president of the Senate and became acting governor.

Pindall served as Governor until January 11, 1909, when his Senate term expired. Pindall's successor was Jesse M. Martin, who served as acting governor for three days. During Pindall's administration, a pure food and drug law was passed, the Ozark National Forest was created, and laws against price discrimination were enacted.

After leaving office, Pindall became a renowned criminal lawyer operating out of an office in Arkansas City.

== Death and legacy ==
Pindall died on January 2, 1935, and is buried in Little Rock, Arkansas, in Roselawn Memorial Park.

The town of Pindall, Arkansas, is named for him. His law office in Arkansas City is on the National Register of Historic Places.

== See also ==
- List of governors of Arkansas
- Xenophon Jacob Pindall, lawyer, state legislator, and judge in Arkansas

Political offices
Preceded by John Isaac Moore; Acting Governor	Acting Governor of Arkansas; 1907–1909	Succeeded by Jesse M. Martin; Acting Governor
