= Margaret Mercer =

American abolitionist and educator (1791–1846)

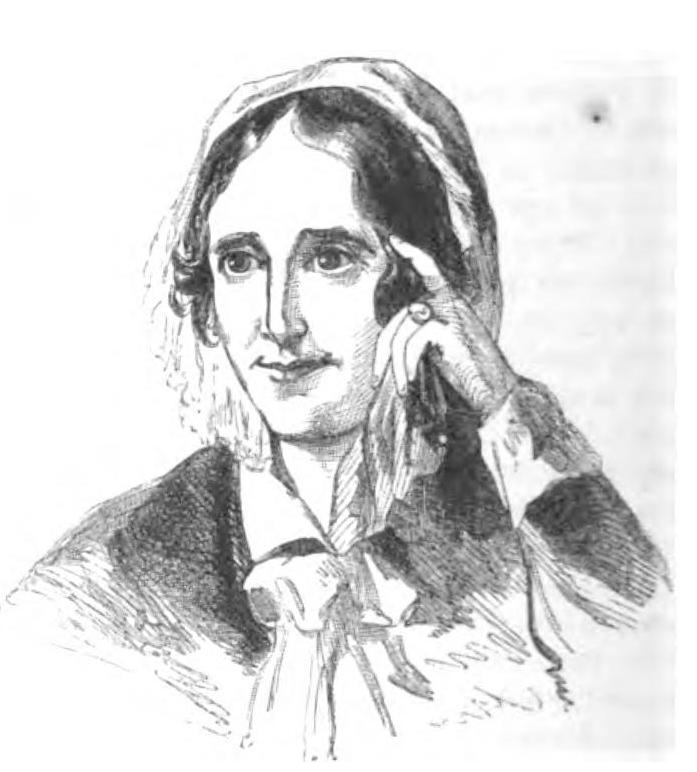
- Born: July 1, 1791; Galesville, Maryland, US
- Died: September 17, 1846 (aged 55); Belmont, Loudoun County, Virginia
- Occupations: Abolitionist, educator

Margaret Mercer (July 1, 1791 – September 17, 1846) was an American abolitionist and educator. She worked to end slavery and freed the Maryland slaves that she inherited from her father, sending six of them to Africa. Mercer started a school and a chapel in Loudoun County that welcomed Black people and continued for a short while after her death. In 2018, a Virginia historical marker was dedicated in her honor.

== Early and family Life ==
Margaret Mercer was born on July 1, 1791, to Maryland governor, planter and veteran politician John Francis Mercer and his wife, the former Sophia Sprigg. Mercer was their fourth child, and one of the descendants of her brother John Mercer would be Lucy Mercer (who much later became known for her relationship with U.S. President Franklin Roosevelt). Her grandfather John Mercer and uncle James Mercer were prominent Virginia lawyers, and her father had served in the Virginia House of Delegates after his service in the American Revolutionary War and before marrying her mother and moving to her family's estates in Anne Arundel County, Maryland. Mercer grew up in the family home named Cedar Park in Galesville, and read widely in her father's library (which contemporaries had admired, as they had the library of her grandfather Mercer). Although her father and both grandfathers had operated their Virginia and Maryland plantations using enslaved labor, Margaret found slavery immoral. She also did not want to marry, and never did. She corresponded with her Essex County, Virginia paternal relatives, including about the important people who visited Cedar Park, the siege of Baltimore during the War of 1812, and her brother's surviving his military service.

== Career ==
Mercer inherited some of her father's 72 slaves upon his death in 1821, but was unable to send any of them to Africa because her father's estate was in debt, and their sale (which creditors wanted but Margaret knew would break up families) could pay off that debt. While her brother remained at the family's Anne Arundel county plantations, Mercer moved to Essex County, Virginia, where she lived with her uncle James Mercer Garnett (a former member of Congress as well as a prominent planter), and with his daughters taught at a school nearby in Elmwood for four years. Margaret Mercer taught classes five days a week, and also helped teach Sunday school. On Saturdays, she worked for the Virginia Colonization Society, a part of the American Colonization Society. The society advocated purchasing slaves' freedom and then settling them in Africa. In 1823, the American Colonization Society bought land on the Guinea Coast (in West Africa), and named it Liberia. Another of her Mercer cousins (who had helped found the American Colonization Society), was Congressman Charles Fenton Mercer, of Loudoun County, who lived on a westward road and also became known for education both education and internal improvements (like roads, canals and later railroads). She also knew architect John H. B. Latrobe, a prominent colonization advocate in Maryland.

In 1825, Mercer returned to Maryland to start a similar school for girls at her family's Cedar Park home, and she managed to pay off the estate's debt with profits raised from the school. Mercer then freed all of the slaves she inherited, sending six of them to Liberia. They arrived in Monrovia on a schooner named Margaret Mercer. The schooner's Captain Abels remained in Liberia for 13 days and in 1832 wrote a positive letter about his experience, which colonizers published. However, three years after the freed slaves arrived in Monrovia, three had died, one moved back to the United States, and another moved further away. [The sixth freed slave's fate remains unknown]. Similar results for other freed slaves sent to Africa led to the colonization movement's decline.

In 1836, Ludwell Lee, a planter and politician who had served as speaker of the Virginia Senate (1799) and also helped C.F. Mercer organize the Loudoun chapter of the American Colonization Society, died and his heirs placed Belmont, his 1,000-plus-acre plantation for sale. Mercer returned to Virginia, bought it and opened a school there named "Belmont Academy". She intended to emphasize agricultural education and how learning about it could remove the need for slave labor. Other courses were: philosophy, ethics, the Bible, French, Latin, geography, geology, and astronomy. Her students were mostly daughters of southern gentry and paid $250 each year for tuition. She employed seven teachers and only one of her students was a boy (John Morris Wample was a teacher's son and later became a Confederate engineer. In the 1840 census, 56 free white people lived on the property (of which 8 were male and 20 females of between 10 and 15 years old and 15 of between 15 and 20 years old, as well as nine enslaved Black women and girls and two free Black girls.

Because of the distance to the nearest church (difficult even on horseback), Mercer asked Latrobe to build Belmont Chapel. In 1841, the chapel opened for services and Bible study. Children of slaves and freed slaves participated with the schoolgirls at the chapel.

== Death and legacy ==
Mercer died of tuberculosis on September 17, 1846, aged 55, at Belmont, and was buried on the estate. Two years later, Morris Caspar published a biography of her life.

She had never married, and her executors Thomas S. Mercer and Richard S. Mercer sold the Belmont estate in 1851 to George Kephart of Frederick County, Maryland, who also bought the former Thomas Ludwell Lee plantation called "Coton" across the Leesburg Pike. Eugenia Kephart, George Kephart's eldest daughter, operated the school and moved it by 1856 to Oak Hill plantation, before closing in the early 1870s when the new Virginia constitution enabled free public education. Richard S. Mercer may have used some of the sale proceeds in 1858 to erect Parkhurst manor in Harwood, in Anne Arundel County, nearly across the state from George Kephart's decades-long farm near Buckeystown (which is about 28 miles away from Belmont, with a nearly direct crossing of the Potomac River along historic Route 15). George Kephart had considerable notoriety, particularly among Loudoun County Quakers at the Goose Creek meeting (about 18 miles from Belmont), for his and his sons' slave catching activities, and 1836 had purchased the Alexandria, Virginia slave-trading firm once known as Franklin & Armfield at 1315 Duke Street (about 40 miles from Belmont, or 50 miles from Buckeystown). George Kephart classified himself as a farmer in the 1850 Federal census for Maryland, and the accompanying slave census only showed him as owning 17 enslaved persons there, but two men of the same name (the other possibly his eldest son on the Maryland census) owned a total of 49 enslaved people in Alexandria. The 1860 Federal census for Loudoun County, Virginia classified George as "Merchant" and his son William as "Tradeing", but the Kephart family (now without George Junior who disappeared from the census but would be buried nearby in 1888, and to which 6 year old Julius had been added, only owned one slave, an 18 year old mulatto woman. Kephart either provided for his children who chose not to continue the business or encountered financial difficulties by 1858, when the firm's name changed to Price, Birch and Co. (which remained the name when Union authorities converted the Alexandria office in 1862 into a jail for Confederate and other prisoners) and in 1860 the Loudoun Circuit Court ordered various properties including Coton liquidated. In 1864, Virginia abolitionist Moncure Conway published Testimonies Concerning Slavery and specifically criticized Kephart, who died at Belmont in 1869, about two years after his wife. His Alexandria slave trading office and jail is now also a historic site and museum.

Although much of the former Belmont estate was developed in recent years, the manor house was placed on the National Register of Historic Places in 1980, and remains today as an event venue, surrounded by the Belmont golf club and gated community developed by Toll Brothers in 1995.

Religious services continued at the Belmont chapel until 1936. Arson destroyed it in 1967. In 1990, St. David's Episcopal Church was built on the former Belmont Chapel site. In 2018, community leaders and politicians from Loudoun County, and Liberia visited St. David's Episcopal Church and School in Ashburn to dedicate a Virginia historical marker in Mercer's honor.
