= Benjamin Harrison VI =

American politician

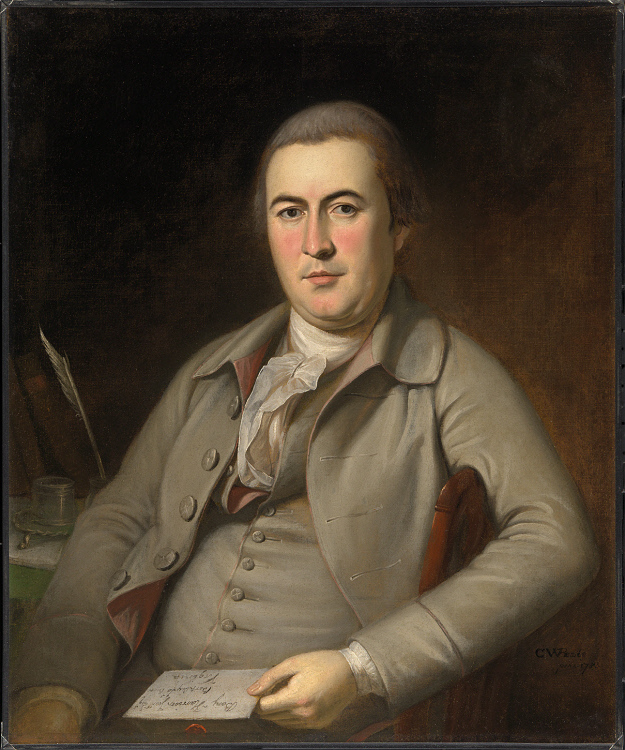
- Portrait of Harrison by Charles Willson Peale
- Born: September 9, 1755; Berkeley Plantation
- Died: August 11, 1799 (aged 43–44); Charles County, Virginia
- Parent(s): Benjamin Harrison V Elizabeth Bassett
- Family: Harrison family of Virginia

Benjamin Harrison VI (September 9, 1755 – August 11, 1799) was an American merchant, planter, politician, and revolutionary. He was a son of Founding Father Benjamin Harrison V, a signer of the Declaration of Independence. Harrison was a close friend of financier Robert Morris, a relationship that he would keep until his death. He was an older brother of President William Henry Harrison and a grand-uncle of President Benjamin Harrison.

== Life ==
Benjamin Harrison VI was born at Berkeley Plantation, the ancestral home of the Harrison family of Virginia, in 1755. His family, the Harrison family of Virginia, was one of the First Families of Virginia, and were among the most wealthy and prosperous people in the state. Benjamin Harrison VI's father was Benjamin Harrison V (1726–1791), a wealthy planter and slave owner, who would later become one of the Founding Fathers of the United States of America. His mother, Elizabeth Bassett (1730–1792), was a descendant of Captain William Bassett II, who was an officer in the King's Army, during the English Civil War.

When Harrison VI became a young adult, his father lost a considerable amount of property, supposedly due to his lack of mercantile skills, and sent his son away to the Philadelphia-based firm Willing and Morris, where he earned an exceptional mercantile education, and befriended Robert Morris and Thomas Willing, the firm's owners. Their friendships would continue to hold strong throughout their lives.

After his education concluded, Harrison traveled to Europe, and began building mercantile connections, as well as his fortune. However, the American Revolutionary War prompted him to return home to Virginia, as he strongly wanted to aid his father and the Patriot cause. From 1774 to 1775, he was a member of the Charles City County Committee, as well as a member of the Virginia House of Delegates. During the war, he became the Deputy Paymaster General of the Continental Army, helping finance and pay the Continental Army during the Southern theater.

After the war, Harrison settled in Richmond and established himself as a successful merchant, and soon thereafter amassed a large amount of wealth. Later in life, his friend, Robert Morris, was in bad financial shape, so Benjamin took it upon himself to save his friend from ruin. He gave Morris a sizable portion of his fortune to aid him, and the latter was forever grateful. In 1790, he took over the ownership of Berkeley Plantation from his aging father, and began a large-scale renovation, adding handsome Adam woodwork and the double arches of the "Great Rooms" inside the mansion.

In 1799, after years of hard work and success, Benjamin Harrison VI died in Charles City, Virginia, at the age of 44. His legitimate son, Benjamin Harrison VII, survived him.

== Benjamin Harrison VI's family ==
Benjamin Harrison VI married twice. First, in 1776, Harrison married Susannah Randolph (1752–1781), a daughter of Richard Randolph II (born c. 1725), who was a slave trader and the son of Richard Randolph of Curles (c. 1691–1749). The Randolphs were descendants from Indian Princess Pocahontas. After his first wife's death he married a woman called Anna Mercer (1760–1787), who died in 1787, days after giving birth to a son, Benjamin Harrison VII (1787–1842). His second wife Anna Mercer was daughter of colonial lawyer John Mercer (1704–1768) for second marriage, and sister of military officer George Mercer (1733–1784), judge James Mercer (1736–1793) and tenth governor of Maryland John Francis Mercer (1759–1821). Some sources say that Harrison had another son, William Henry Harrison, whom he named after his brother.

== Legacy ==
John Trumbull's Declaration of Independence – Benjamin Harrison is seated at the table far left

Benjamin Harrison VI's accomplishments, compared to his father's, his brother's, and his grandnephew's, have been less prominent in the annals of American history. However, one interesting fact about him was that when John Trumbull was painting his massive portrait of the signing of the Declaration of Independence, he had no portrait of signer Benjamin Harrison V to work with. So, his son, Benjamin Harrison VI, who was said to have a striking resemblance to his father, was used as his model.
