= John Mercer (colonial lawyer) =

Irish-born lawyer, planter, politician and writer

- Born: February 6, 1704; Dublin, Kingdom of Ireland
- Died: October 14, 1768 (aged 64); Marlborough plantation, Stafford County, Virginia Colony, British America
- Occupations: Lawyer, real estate investor, planter, politician, author
- Spouses: Catherine Mason; Ann Roy
- Children: 19, including George Mercer, James Mercer, John Francis Mercer

John Mercer (February 6, 1704 – October 14, 1768) was an Irish-born lawyer, planter, politician and writer.

== Biography ==
Born in Dublin, Kingdom of Ireland, His parents were John Mercer (1670–1717) of Dublin, and his wife Grace Fenton (1680–1763), he came to Virginia in 1720, where he built the colonial estate Marlborough (also called Marlboro; at Marlborough Point on the Potomac River, in Stafford County). He was a leading Virginia attorney and lawyer to George Washington, as well as a colonial prosecutor for the King's court of Virginia, particularly in then-vast Orange County.

He authored "Dinwiddianae" (4 November 1754 – 3 May 1757; also known as "The Dinwiddianae Poems and Prose"), plus "Abridgement of the Public Acts" (1737; "An Exact Abridgment of the Public Acts of the Assembly of Virginia"), "First Code of Virginia Laws" (1759), and "Abridgment of Virginia Laws" ("Mercer's Abridgement of the Laws of Virginia"). Mercer was also a founding member, secretary and general counsel of the Ohio Company of Virginia, a land speculating company that had George Washington as a member. His private library consisted of between 1500 and 1800 volumes. Did legal work for George Washington land deals as a down payment as a partner, died owing Washington the balance of partnership. His heirs deeded 790 acres (just west of the present day intersection of South Four Mile Run Drive and South Walter Reed Drive in Arlington County, Virginia) to Washington in payment.

== Family ==
Coat of Arms of John Mercer

Married Catherine Mason (June 21, 1707 – June 15, 1750) on June 10, 1725. Married again, after the death of his first wife, to Ann Roy (1729–1770), on November 10, 1750. He had several children (at least 11), many of which (5) died during childhood. Three sons lived to become prominent in Eighteenth Century America:

- George Mercer (1733–1784), surveyor, military officer, and politician from Virginia.
- James Mercer (1736–1793), judge, lawyer, and jurist who served as a delegate for Virginia to the Continental Congress in 1779.
- John Francis Mercer (1759–1821), Captain of the 3rd Virginia during the Revolutionary War, Anti-Federalist at the Constitutional Convention, and Governor of Maryland, 1801–03.

A fourth son, John Fenton Mercer (1735–1756) was commissioned a captain in 1755 under George Washington, commander of the Virginia Regiment and was killed on April 18, 1756, at the "Battle of the Great Cacapon River" or "Mercer's Massacre." All four of John Mercer's sons attended the College of Willilam and Mary.

John Mercer also had several daughters:

- Sarah Ann Mason Mercer (1738–1806) – was married colonel Samuel Selden (1725–1791).
- Mary Mercer (1740–1764) – was married Daniel McCarty Jr.
- Grace Mercer (1751–1814) – was married planter Muscoe Garnett (1736–1803).
- Anna Mercer (1760–1787) – was married Benjamin Harrison VI (1755–1799), eldest brother of 9th president of USA William Henry Harrison.
- Maria Mercer (born 1761) – was married Richard Brooke (1760–1816).

Uncle to George Mason, became Mason's legal guardian, along with Mason's mother. Mason studied in Mercer's private library. The Mercer Library at the Prince William Campus of George Mason University is named in his honor.

Grandfather of General George Mercer Brooke (1785–1851). Also grandfather of Charles Fenton Mercer (1778–1858; son of James). Among his other descendants was politician and slave owner James Mercer Garnett (1770–1843), congressman Robert Selden Garnett (1789–1840), Benjamin Harrison VII (1787–1842), John Mercer (1788–1848), Richard Mercer (1789–1821), Margaret Mercer (1791–1846), lawyer Muscoe Russell Hunter Garnett (1821–1864), military officer Robert Selden Garnett (1819–1861) and sailor, engineer, scientist and educator John Mercer Brooke (1826–1906).
