= Robert Selden Garnett =

Robert Selden Garnett may refer to:

- Robert S. Garnett (1819–1861), U.S. Army officer and Confederate Army general
- Robert S. Garnett (congressman) (1789–1840), Virginia congressman and lawyer
