= John Roane =

American politician (1766–1838)

John Roane (February 9, 1766 – November 15, 1838) was an eighteenth and nineteenth century politician from Virginia. He was the father of congressman John J. Roane.

== Biography ==
Born at "Uppowac" in King William County, Virginia, Roane pursued in preparatory studies as a young man. He was a member of the Virginia House of Delegates from 1788 to 1790 and again in 1792. He was a delegate to the Virginia Ratifying Convention in 1788; an event held at the Richmond Theatre.

He was chosen as an elector for the 1789 election from King & Queen District. All of the 10 electors from Virginia who voted cast one of their two votes for George Washington. 5 of them cast their other vote for John Adams. 3 cast theirs for George Clinton. 1 cast his for John Hancock. 1 cast his for John Jay. Roane was one of three Clinton Electors chosen

Roane was later elected a Democratic-Republican to the United States House of Representatives in 1808, serving from 1809 to 1815. He engaged in agricultural pursuits before returning to the House in 1827, again as a Democratic-Republican and later a Jacksonian, serving until 1831 when he was succeeded by his son John J. Roane. He was elected to his second Convention at the Virginia Constitutional Convention of 1829-1830.

He returned to the Congress a third time in 1835, serving again until 1837. Roane died on November 15, 1838, at "Uppowac" and was interred at the family cemetery in Rumford, Virginia.

U.S. House of Representatives
Preceded by James M. Garnett	Member of the U.S. House of Representatives from Virginia's 11th congressional district March 4, 1809 – March 3, 1813	Succeeded by John Dawson
Preceded by Burwell Bassett	Member of the U.S. House of Representatives from Virginia's 12th congressional district March 4, 1813 – March 3, 1815 (obsolete district)	Succeeded by William H. Roane
Preceded by Robert S. Garnett	Member of the U.S. House of Representatives from Virginia's 12th congressional district March 4, 1827 – March 3, 1831 (obsolete district)	Succeeded by John J. Roane
Preceded by William P. Taylor	Member of the U.S. House of Representatives from Virginia's 9th congressional district March 4, 1835 – March 3, 1837	Succeeded by Robert M.T. Hunter
