= George Mercer (military officer) =

American-born military officer and politician (1733–1784)

Member of the Virginia House of Burgesses from Frederick County
- In office 1761–1763 Serving with George Washington
- Preceded by: Thomas Bryan Martin
- Succeeded by: Robert Rutherford

Personal details
- Born: June 23, 1733 Marlborough plantation, Stafford County, Virginia Colony, British America
- Died: April 4, 1784 (aged 50) England
- Resting place: London, England
- Relatives: John Mercer, James Mercer, John Francis Mercer
- Occupation: surveyor, politician

Military service
- Allegiance: Kingdom of Great Britain
- Branch: Virginia militia
- Rank: Colonel
- Battles/wars: French and Indian War: Battle of Fort Necessity; Lord Dunmore’s War

Colonel George Mercer (June 23, 1733 – April 1784) was an American-born military officer, surveyor and politician from the British colony of Virginia who served in the Virginia militia during the French and Indian War and Lord Dunmore’s War.

== Early and family life ==
Born at Marlborough Plantation, Colony of Virginia, to emigrant and King's Counsel John Mercer and his wife, the former Catherine Mason (daughter of George Mason II), George received a private education suitable to his class, as he would become the eldest surviving son of wealthy planter and real estate investor. He had several siblings, the most famous of those surviving being Virginia lawyer and judge James Mercer (1735–93) and Virginia militia captain and later Maryland governor John Francis Mercer. He was a maternal cousin to George Mason, for whom his father served as guardian after George Mason III died when his son was a child.

In 1767 Mercer married Mary Neville at Scarborough, England, but she died a year later, and they had no surviving children.

== Career ==
George Mercer surveyed lands on the frontier, including across the Appalachian Mountains which the Virginia colony claimed according to its charter (which like that of Pennsylvania set no western boundary, unlike that issued to Maryland), particularly those in which his father or the Ohio Company (in which his father and many other Tidewater planters, including George Washington invested) were interested in developing. Native Americans often disagreed with the colonial claims. Thus, frontier settlements were subject to attack, particularly since France also claimed much of North America and French and British traders sold weapons in exchange for furs either at trading posts or during their journeys further into the frontier. The Ohio Company had established one fortified trading post and storehouse at Ridgeley in western Virginia not far across the Potomac River headwaters from Cumberland, Maryland in 1750.

In 1754, as the French and Indian War began, Mercer joined the provincial Virginia Regiment as a lieutenant. He served under Captain (later Colonel) George Washington, a fellow surveyor raised in Stafford County near Fredericksburg. Later that year, he would be wounded in defending Fort Necessity, and be promoted to captain. The Virginia General Assembly had placed Washington in charge of the frontier's defense, and he took over existing frontier forts and created others (that at Ridgeley became "Fort Ohio"). Washington would name his base Fort Loudoun (which defended Winchester, the seat of then-vast Frederick County). Lt. John Fenton Mercer, George's slightly younger brother, was killed and scalped at Edwards's Fort in April 1756. In 1758, George Mercer accepted command of the newly formed Second Virginia Regiment, with a commission as lieutenant colonel.

In 1758, the governor assigned both Virginia regiments to regular British Army Brigadier General John Forbes, who planned to march from Philadelphia westward and take Fort Duquesne in the western frontier. On November 12, while on patrol from Fort Ligonier to repel French and Indian raids, the 2nd Virginia accidentally engaged Washington and the 1st Virginia in a heavy fog and at night. Two officers and 38 men were killed or wounded in the friendly fire incident.

After the war, Mercer accepted appointment as Assistant Deputy Quartermaster-General for Maryland and Virginia (1759). Then, in 1761, Frederick County voters elected him as one of their two representatives in the House of Burgesses together with George Washington. During this time, Mercer also speculated in Ohio River Valley lands in his own right. However, he was not re-elected as a Burgess.

Mercer had sailed to England as the Ohio Company of Virginia's agent, and while there accepted appointment as royal Stamp Collector for Maryland and Virginia. The Stamp Act (one of the Intolerable Acts) was a British law to recoup funds spent on the French and Indian War – and highly unpopular in Virginia. When Mercer arrived in Williamsburg in late October 1765 to attend the General Court, he experienced violent protests as well as condemnation in the Virginia Gazette. He resigned as tax collector and arranged for the stamps to be kept aboard a royal warship, and his brother James' support prevented physical injury. Mercer was also later appointed Governor of North Carolina, but never assumed that position.

Before his father's death in 1768, Mercer returned to England as the Ohio Company's agent. He received a full share when he arranged for the Ohio Company to merge with the Vandalia Company in 1770 (creating the Grand Ohio Group) while the remaining Ohio Company shareholders split two shares, though he continued to pester George Mason as the Ohio Company treasurer for funds.

Mercer also married and was widowed in England, where he remained as a Loyalist during the American Revolutionary War. He died in London in 1784.

== Death and legacy ==
Mercer died in London and was buried there. His nephew Charles Fenton Mercer possessed many of his papers, and lived the last part of his life with his niece, Judith, and her husband, Rev. John Page McGuire, headmaster of Episcopal High School in Alexandria, Virginia. Although McGuire's residence, "Howard" was commandeered by Union soldiers in 1861 after the Confederate-sympathizing family evacuated, and some papers burned and others sold to an antique dealer, the family sold other papers to Morven Jones. In 1876, antiquarian and attorney William McCullough Darlington (1815–1889) of Pittsburgh, Pennsylvania, bought papers from Jones, and some were published along with the journals of Christopher Gist in 1893. The widow Mrs. Mary Darlington provided some copies to William R. Mercer early in the next century. After the death of Mr. Darlington's attorney, Frank C. Osborne, other papers were sent to the Historical Society of Western Pennsylvania, where they were recognized as part of the papers that had been part of Darlington's library willed to the University of Pittsburgh, which had organized the Darlington Memorial Library in 1936. The University of Pittsburgh Press published them in 1954.
