= John J. Roane =

American politician

John Jones Roane (October 31, 1794 – December 18, 1869) was a nineteenth-century clerk and congressman from Virginia. He was the son of congressman John Roane.

== Biography ==
Roane was born in Essex County, Virginia, to politician John Roane. After completing preparatory studies, Roane attended Rumford Academy in King William County, Virginia, and later Princeton College in New Jersey, but did not graduate. He engaged in agricultural pursuits and served as a private in the Fourth Regiment of the Virginia Militia during the War of 1812. He was a member of the Virginia House of Delegates from 1820 to 1823 and was later elected a Jacksonian to the United States House of Representatives in 1830, succeeding his father, serving from 1831 to 1833. Roane was a clerk in the United States Patent Office from 1836 to 1851 and a special agent for the United States Treasury Department from 1855 to 1867. He died in Washington, D.C., on December 18, 1869, and was interred there at Glenwood Cemetery.

== Bibliography ==
- Bailey, N. Louise; Morgan, Mary L.; Taylor, Carolyn R. (1986). Biographical Directory of the South Carolina Senate: 1776-1985. Volume 1. Columbia, S.C.: University of South Carolina Press. ISBN 0872494799.

U.S. House of Representatives
Preceded by John Roane	Member of the U.S. House of Representatives from Virginia's 12th congressional district March 4, 1831 – March 3, 1833 (obsolete district)	Succeeded by William F. Gordon
