= James M. Garnett =

American politician (1770–1843)

James Mercer Garnett

Member of the Virginia House of Delegates from Essex County
- In office November 29, 1824 – December 4, 1825 Serving with Lawrence Muse
- Preceded by: Austin Brockenbrough
- Succeeded by: David Pitts

Member of the U.S. House of Representatives from Virginia's 11th district
- In office March 4, 1805 – March 4, 1809
- Preceded by: Anthony New
- Succeeded by: John Roane

Member of the Virginia House of Delegates from Essex County
- In office December 2, 1799 – December 6, 1801 Serving with John Daingerfield
- Preceded by: James Webb
- Succeeded by: William Brockenbrough

Personal details
- Born: June 8, 1770
- Died: April 23, 1843 (aged 72)
- Occupation: Slave Owner, politician, educator, author

James Mercer Garnett (June 8, 1770 – April 23, 1843) was a nineteenth-century politician and slave owner from Virginia, who served two terms in the United States House of Representatives from 1805 to 1809, and separate terms in the Virginia House of Delegates representing Essex County, Virginia.

== Early and family life ==
Born at "Elmwood" near Loretto, Essex County, Virginia, Garnett could trace his descent from the First Families of Virginia on both sides of his family. He was named for his paternal grandfather, James Garnett (1692–1765), who served in the Virginia House of Burgesses as well as operated plantations in Essex County using enslaved labor. His father, Muscoe Garnett (1736–1803), also served in the House of Burgesses and operated plantations using enslaved labor. His mother Grace Fenton Mercer (1751–1814) was the daughter of prominent Stafford County planter and attorney John Mercer (1704–1768), and his cousin through her brother James Mercer (1736–1793), Charles F. Mercer (1778–1858), would also become a Congressman and prominent abolitionist. His younger brother Robert S. Garnett (1789–1840) also became a Congressman, and his brother William Garnett (1786–1866) moved to North Carolina where he operated plantations as well as survived the American Civil War. Meanwhile, James Mercer Garnett received a private education suitable to his class.

In 1793, he married his cousin (James Mercer's daughter) Mary Eleanor Dick Mercer (1774–1837) and they had nine children, including James M. Garnett Jr. (1794–1824) and five daughters who reached adulthood: Ann Garnett (1797–1835), Mary Garnett Waring (1802–1822), Grace Fenton Garnett (1805–1826), Mary Mercer Garnett McGuire (1808–1841) and Eliza Garnett (1815–1847). His grandson Muscoe Russell Hunter Garnett (1821–1864) would become a prominent lawyer, Virginia politician and Confederate congressman long after this man's death. Several other grandsons would serve the Confederacy, including Dr. J.G.M. McGuire,

== Career ==
Garnet inherited plantations in Essex County (including Elmwood) and continued the family tradition of farming using enslaved labor, although as discussed below, he would become a leading advocate of scientific agriculture and education. He owned 115 enslaved people in Essex County in 1820, 109 enslaved people there in 1830, and 63 enslaved people in the last census in his lifetime,

Essex County voters first elected Garnett as one of their representatives in the Virginia House of Delegates in 1799 and re-elected him in 1800. However, he refused to campaign for votes, which he considered degrading.

In 1804, voters in Virginia's 11th congressional district elected him as a Democratic-Republican to the United States House of Representatives, and re-elected him in 1806, so he served from 1805 to 1809. During this time, he in effect was a member of the grand jury that indicted former Vice President Aaron Burr for treason in 1807. Mercer did not seek reelection in 1808, and John Roane succeeded him.

Despite his dislike for political campaigning, Garnett became a leading advocate for applying scientific techniques to farming, and strove to educate fellow farmers. In 1817 he helped found the Fredericksburg Agricultural Society, and served as its president for two decades. In 1820 Garnett led his fellow Fredericksburg area farmers in a protest against recent protective tariffs, then attended several national anti-tariff conventions between 1821 and 1831. Some criticized Garnett's advocacy, and thought he should emulate the wealth orientation of Robert Payne Waring (who never served in the legislature). Nonetheless, Essex County grew to have considerable power (Richmond politics being supposedly governed by the "Essex Junto" led by Judge Spencer Roane for several decades). In 1837 Garnett's lobbying in Richmond for creation of a state agricultural board led to creation of the Virginia Board of Agriculture, with himself as the first president. Garnett also worked with Edmund Ruffin, another vociferous agricultural advocate, and in 1842 established the Agricultural Society of Essex. Garnett often voiced admiration for Jeffersonian agricultural ideals, especially the "yeoman farmer" who owned fewer than 300 acres and only a few slaves. He also became known for his tirades against farmers becoming lawyers and doctors, for he claimed that weakened the pride farmers should take in their profession.

In 1816 Garnett hosted Henry Knight of Massachusetts, who had been educated at Andover, Harvard and Brown and planned to spend a year in Virginia, then tour the South to complete his education. He had visited Richmond (where people recommended he visit Garnett's Essex County plantation), and would later travel westward to Kentucky and New Orleans.

Garnett also established a school for boys on his Elmwood plantation, as well as in 1824 published Lectures on Female Education: Comprising the First and Second Series of a Course Delivered to Mrs. Garnett's Pupils, at Elm-wood, Essex County, Virginia.

Unlike Ruffin, who vehemently defended slavery, Garnett became a member of the American Colonization Society and later vice-president of the Virginia Colonization Society. His cousin (and also Congressman from Loudoun County to the west) Charles Fenton Mercer would become the American Colonization Society's president. In 1821, Garnett also invited his orphaned cousin Margaret Mercer to Virginia, and she worked with his daughters at the Elmwood school, as well as established a school for educating Blacks at Loretto, before returning to Maryland to establish a girls' school at her family plantation in Anne Arundel County, and later moving her school to Loudoun County, Virginia.

Essex County voters thwarted Garnett's attempted return to politics in 1815, but returned Garnett as one of their representatives in the House of Delegates in 1824. He, John Roane, William P. Taylor and Richard Morris, became the delegates to the Virginia Constitutional Convention of 1829–1830 from the Virginia Tidewater counties of King William, King and Queen, Essex, Caroline and Hanover. The convention's main issues were increased representation for western Virginia (which passed although attenuated), as well as a proposal for the gradual abolition of slavery (which did not pass, the convention occurring shortly after crushing of Nat Turner's slave rebellion). Garnett had foreseen the convention's importance and published Constitutional Charts, or Comparative Views of the Legislative, Executive, and Judiciary Departments in all the states in the Union, Including the United States before the convention began, and on the floor advocated restricting suffrage to landowners.

== Death and legacy ==
Garnett died at his Elmwood estate on April 23, 1843, and was interred in the family cemetery on the estate. He had survived his wife, only son the reach adulthood, and most of his daughters. After his death, his widowed former son-in-law Rev. John Peyton McGuire (1800-1869, who had remarried to Judith Brockenbrough) established a school in Essex County and promoted his innovation of report cards.

U.S. House of Representatives
Preceded by Anthony New	Member of the U.S. House of Representatives from Virginia's 11th congressional district March 4, 1805 – March 3, 1809	Succeeded by John Roane
