= James Mercer (judge) =

American judge

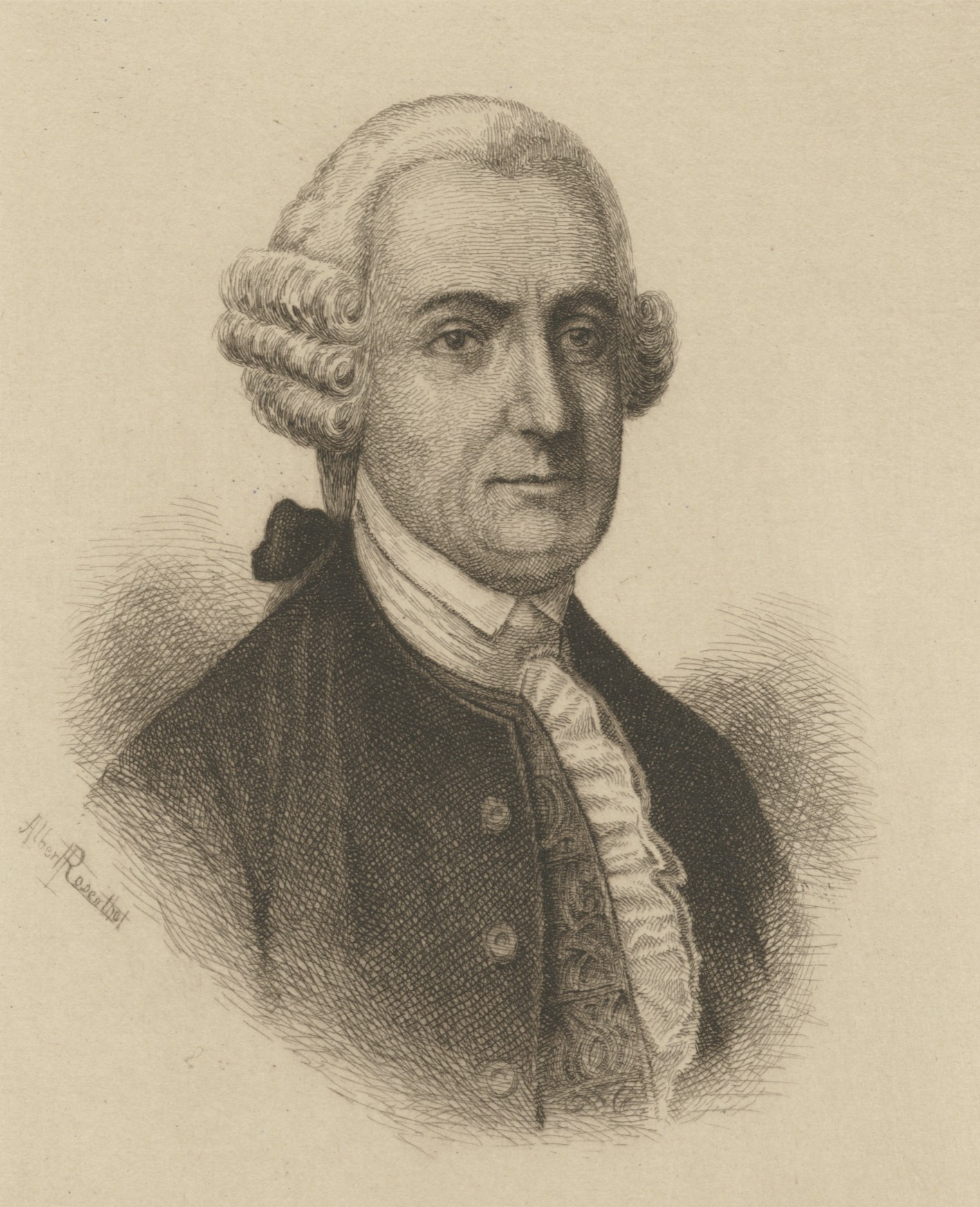

Justice of the Virginia Supreme Court
- In office November 14, 1789 – October 31, 1793

Member of the Virginia House of Delegates from the Hampshire County district
- In office October 7, 1776 – December 21, 1776 Serving with Abraham Hite
- Succeeded by: Joseph Neville

Member of the Virginia House of Delegates from the Hampshire County district
- In office 1761–1776 Serving with Thomas Rutherford, Abraham Hite, Alexander White, Joseph Neville,
- Preceded by: James Keith
- Succeeded by: n/a

Personal details
- Born: February 26, 1736 Stafford County, Virginia, US
- Died: October 31, 1793 (aged 57) Richmond, Virginia, US
- Spouse: Mary Eleanor Dick
- Children: John Fenton Mercer, Charles Fenton Mercer, Mary Mercer Garnett, Lucinda Mercer Betton
- Relatives: John Mercer, John Francis Mercer, George Mercer
- Education: College of William and Mary
- Occupation: Lawyer, soldier, planter, judge, politician

James Mercer (February 26, 1736 – October 31, 1793) was a Virginia lawyer, military officer, planter, jurist and politician.

== Early and family life ==
Mercer was born in Stafford County, Virginia at his family's Marlborough plantation on February 26, 1736. His mother, the former Catherine Mason, was the youngest daughter of George Mason II, a prominent planter and his second wife Elizabeth Waugh, daughter of Rev. John Waugh. His father John Mercer had emigrated from Ireland and become a prominent lawyer, planter and land speculator. He married twice, although most of his children died before reaching legal age. James' mother Catherine bore ten children before her death in 1750 (when James was 14) and his stepmother Ann Roy (daughter of Dr. Mungo Roy of Essex County) bore nine children and survived her husband by two years.

Thus James Mercer was born into the First Families of Virginia and received a private education suitable to his class, as well as access to his father's library, if not the best, then one of the best in the area. At the time, Virginia had a primogeniture law so that landed estates passed to the firstborn son, clearly not James, as he knew in particular because his father was the guardian of and responsible for the education of his cousin George Mason, the firstborn son of George Mason III, who had died in a ferry accident. In 1753, John Mercer provided for James' future by apprenticing him to a master carpenter and builder, William Waite, and also bound with him four enslaved young Black men, so that at the end of the apprenticeship, Mercer would be able to build houses, churches, courthouses and other buildings in the region. Although Virginia did not abolish primogeniture until 1785, either the apprenticeship changed James' career path or his father reconsidered, for soon (like his two elder brothers who survived infancy and are discussed below), he traveled to Williamsburg for higher education under prominent lawyer George Wythe and others, and graduated from the College of William and Mary about 1755.

His eldest brother to reach adulthood, George Mercer, would become a planter, politician, soldier (in the French and Indian War) and speculator in western lands, before traveling to England as a representative of the Ohio Company (as well as Loyalist in the American Revolutionary War), and marrying but dying childless. His younger half brother John Francis Mercer would likewise become a planter and military officer (in the American Revolutionary War), but he married an heiress in Anne Arundel County, Maryland, where he would live, rise to become the state's Governor. His youngest brother Robert Mercer (1764-1800) also became a lawyer as well as newspaper editor. He married a daughter of prominent planter Landon Carter of King George County, but like the eldest brother George would only serve one term in the House of Delegates. James Mercer's sister Sarah Ann Mason Mercer (1738–1806) became the second wife of Col. Samuel Selden (1725–1791) and bore a son who reached adulthood, and his sister Mary Mercer (1740-1764) married Daniel McCarty Jr. but had no surviving children. Thus, James Mercer would ultimately share his wealth with his sons (neither of whom married) and the progeny of his half-sisters Grace Fenton Mercer (1751-1814); who married Essex County planter Muscoe Garnett (1736–1803), Anna Mercer (1760-1787); who married Benjamin Harrison VI., (son of Benjamin Harrison V the signer of the Declaration of Independence), and Maria Mercer (born 1761); who married Richard Brooke (1760–1816) of King and Queen County.

In 1772, James Mercer married Mary Eleanor Dick, the daughter of Major Charles Dick of Fredericksburg. Before she died in 1780, they had sons John Fenton Mercer (1773-1812) and Charles Fenton Mercer (1778-1858), who when they reached adulthood would continue the family political tradition, and daughters Mary Eleanor Dick Mercer (1774-1837; who would marry her cousin James Mercer Garnett), and Lucinda Mercer who married Solomon Betton of Loudoun County before resettling in Georgia. His younger son Charles Fenton Mercer would follow the family's legal and military path (in the War of 1812) as well as serve multiple terms in the House of Delegates in his uncle's lifetime before long service in the U.S. House of Representatives. He also promoted the Chesapeake and Ohio Canal after this man's death (and became its president for a time), which also served the family's longstanding and ongoing western real estate interests.

== Military officer ==
In 1750, the Ohio Company, in which his father and George Washington were investors, established a store and fortified storehouse in Ridgeley west of the Appalachian Mountains, which was confiscated for military purposes as the French and Indian War began and became Fort Ohio. The legislature commissioned Col. George Washington as "defender of the Frontier", and he ordered a chain of forts constructed to protect traders and settlers on the frontier. Washington made Fort Loudoun in Winchester (the Frederick County seat still east of the Appalachians) his headquarters. Although his surveyor brother Lieutenant George Mercer would survive his wound at the battle of Fort Necessity in 1754 and rise to the rank of captain, his other brother Captain John Fenton Mercer, (1735–1756) was killed and scalped on April 18, 1756, at Fort Edward in what some called the "Battle of the Great Cacapon River" or "Mercer's Massacre" since 34 members of the garrison died and only six escaped the Native American attack. James Mercer, like his two elder brothers, had accepted an officer's commission after graduation. In 1756, Captain James Mercer became the commander of Fort Loudoun. However, when the war ended, the British forbad further settlement west of the Appalachians, which crimped the Ohio Company. Moreover, John Mercer and his descendants were not closely related to Dr. Hugh Mercer, a Scotsman who fought for the British in the French and Indian War before settling in Fredericksburg, where he become a prominent physician and militia officer before rising to the rank of General in the American Revolutionary War.

== Lawyer, politician, planter and judge ==
After the war ended, Col. George Washington and Capt. George Mercer entered politics, though they would choose opposite sides in the next conflict. In 1761, Frederick County voters elected George Mercer and George Washington as their two representatives in the Virginia House of Burgesses. Voters in Hampshire County (which had been split from Frederick County in 1753 but remained lightly settled and was greatly affected by the post-war British ban on trans-Appalachian settlement) elected James Keith and Thomas Rutherford as their (part-time) representatives. However, James Keith soon resigned in order to become the Hampshire county clerk, and James Mercer replaced him for the long session, then consistently won re-election annually for the following decade, with several different men served as the county's other burgess. Unlike his brother James, George Mercer would only serve one term as a Burgess, possibly because he agreed to become a collector for the hated Stamp Tax in 1763 (though community pressure forced him to decline the position), Complicating matters, James Mercer did not live in Hampshire County, but his family owned property there. Western Virginia counties had problems sending representatives to the legislature at Williamsburg, due to both the costs and time required to travel, as Daniel Morgan (who led a successful defense of Fort Edward in the French and Indian War before his heroics in the American Revolutionary War and legislative service from his Winchester base), well knew.

After Dunmore's War, tensions with the royal governor escalated, and he dissolved the legislature. Hampshire County voters elected Mercer and newcomer Joseph Neville to represent them at the first four Virginia Conventions, and Mercer and long-term Hardy County resident Abraham Hite represented them at the Fifth Virginia Convention. Mercer and Hite then served as Hampshire County's first two delegates in the House of Delegates in 1776. Fellow delegates then chose Mercer as one of Virginia's representatives in the Continental Congress in 1779.

Meanwhile, Mercer had a house in Fredericksburg, but officially made his plantation in Spotsylvania County his residence. He served on the Spotsylvania County Committee of Correspondence before the war, and owned enslaved people at both locations: nine adults and three children in Fredericksburg in 1787 as well as 18 adults and 26 children in Spotsylvania County. By 1786, Mercer was a trustee of a new school in Fredericksburg, the Fredericksburg Academy, noting that it was ideal for training young men "of the middle Rank, a class the best fitted for a voyage though Life," and George Mason would send both his younger sons there, as well as his second wife's nephew, George Graham.

Legislators selected Mercer as judge of the general court in 1780 and in 1788 he became one of the judges on the first Court of Appeals (later reorganized as the Supreme Court of Virginia). That year, Abraham Hite, who had represented Hampshire County alongside the nonresident Hite years earlier, but had been engaged in a long-running land dispute, moved from what had become Hardy County to Kentucky. On April 30, 1789 Judge Mercer admitted several new attorneys to the Virginia bar, including future President James Monroe, future U.S. Supreme Court justices John Marshall and Bushrod Washington, future senator John Taylor of Caroline, future Congressman Richard Brent, future Virginia governor Robert Brooke, future Maryland governor John Francis Mercer (his youngest half brother) and John Taliaferro Brooke (who would become one of his executors).

== Death and legacy ==
Judge Mercer died in office in Richmond on October 31, 1793, about a year after his friend and fellow Ohio Company member George Mason.

Since his wife had died years earlier and their two daughters and one of their sons had not reached legal age, guardians were needed to administer his estate. Although he had anticipated this in his will, executed on May 23, 1791 (with a codicil dated three days later), his brothers in law Muscoe Garnett of Essex County and Benjamin Harrison of Richmond, refused to carry out their duties as executors, despite an order from the Spotsylvania County court (which had jurisdiction as his residence). Ultimately, relatives John Taliaferro Brooke and James Mercer Garnett were appointed in their place. Among other terms, Mercer's will gave 1000 pounds to his elder daughter Mary Eleanor Dick Mercer (with her aunt Mrs. Selden named as guardian), 300 pounds to his younger daughter Lucinda Mercer, his Bull Run land to son Charles Fenton Mercer, and other devises to his elder son John Fenton Mercer and niece Martha Mercer. Ultimately, all four children reached adulthood, although neither of his sons married.
