= Cedar Park (Galesville, Maryland) =

Historic house in Maryland, United States

- U.S. National Register of Historic Places
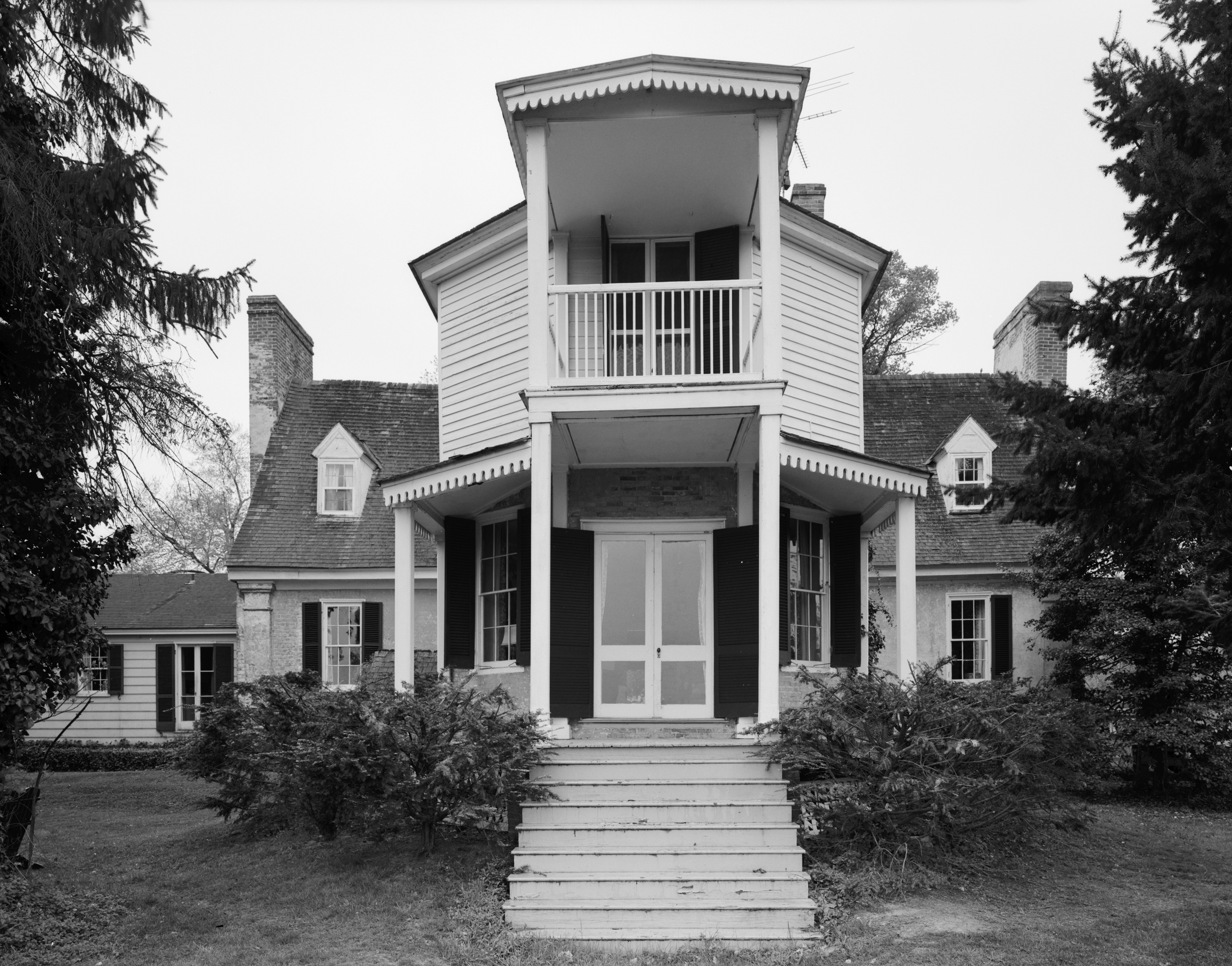
- Cedar Park, circa 1933

- Location within Maryland Location within the United States
- Nearest city: Galesville, Maryland
- Coordinates: 38°51′37″N 76°32′56″W
- Built: 1825
- NRHP reference No.: 69000061
- Added to NRHP: May 15, 1969

Cedar Park is a historic home at Galesville, Anne Arundel County, Maryland, United States. It was originally constructed in 1702 as a 1 1/2-story post-in-the-ground structure, with hand-hewn timbers and riven clapboards and chimneys at either end, the earliest surviving earthfast constructed dwelling in Maryland and Virginia. Later additions and modifications, in 1736 and in the early 19th century, resulted in the brick structure of today. Also on the property is a frame tenant house or slave quarters of the mid-19th century. It was the birthplace and home of Founding Father John Francis Mercer, and between 1825 and 1834 it was an academy for young women operated by his daughter, Margaret Mercer, as "Miss Mercer's School."

Cedar Park was listed on the National Register of Historic Places in 1969.

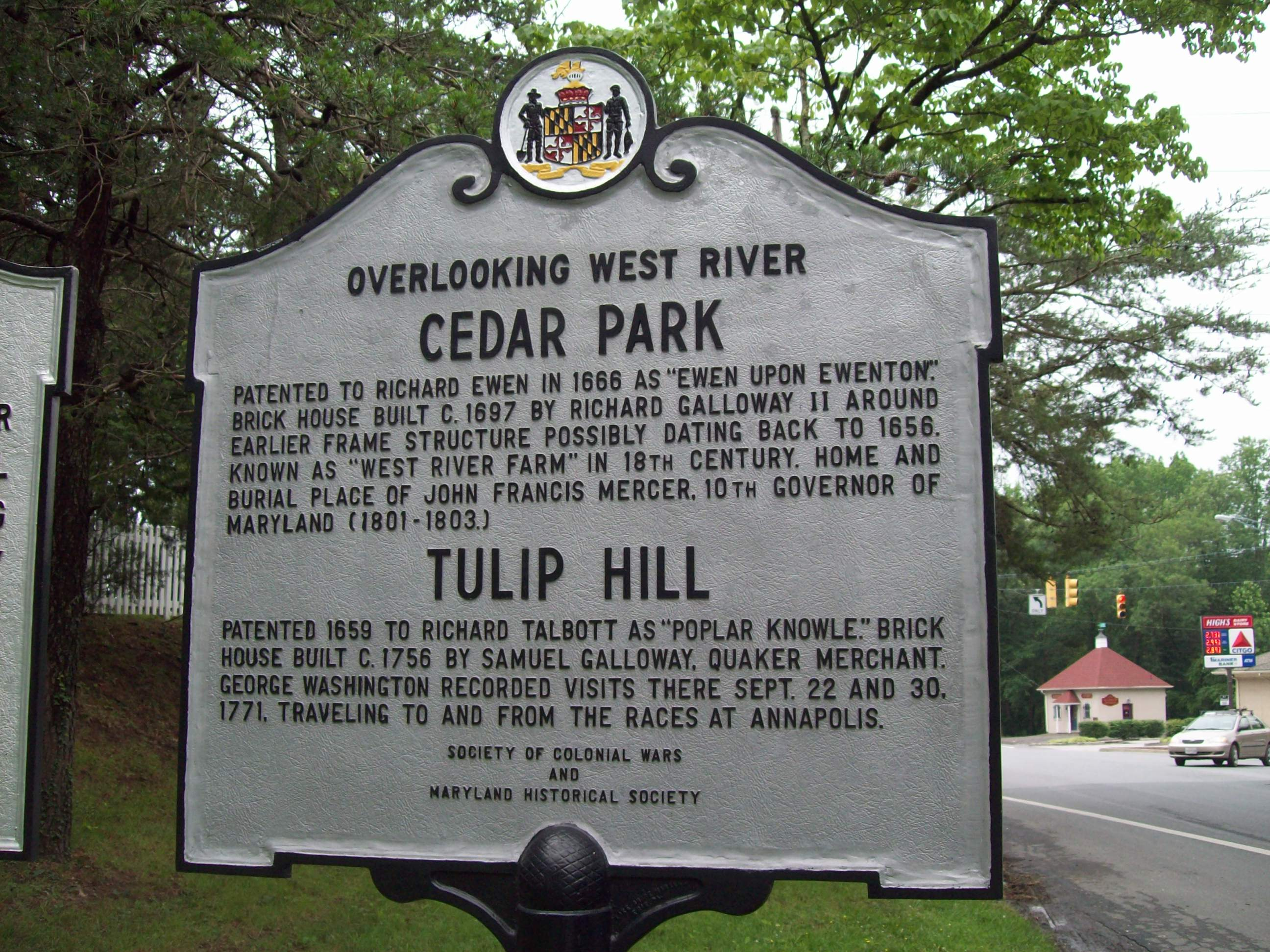
Cedar Park Historic Marker, May 2010
