= Parkhurst (Harwood, Maryland) =

Historic house in Maryland, United States

- U.S. National Register of Historic Places
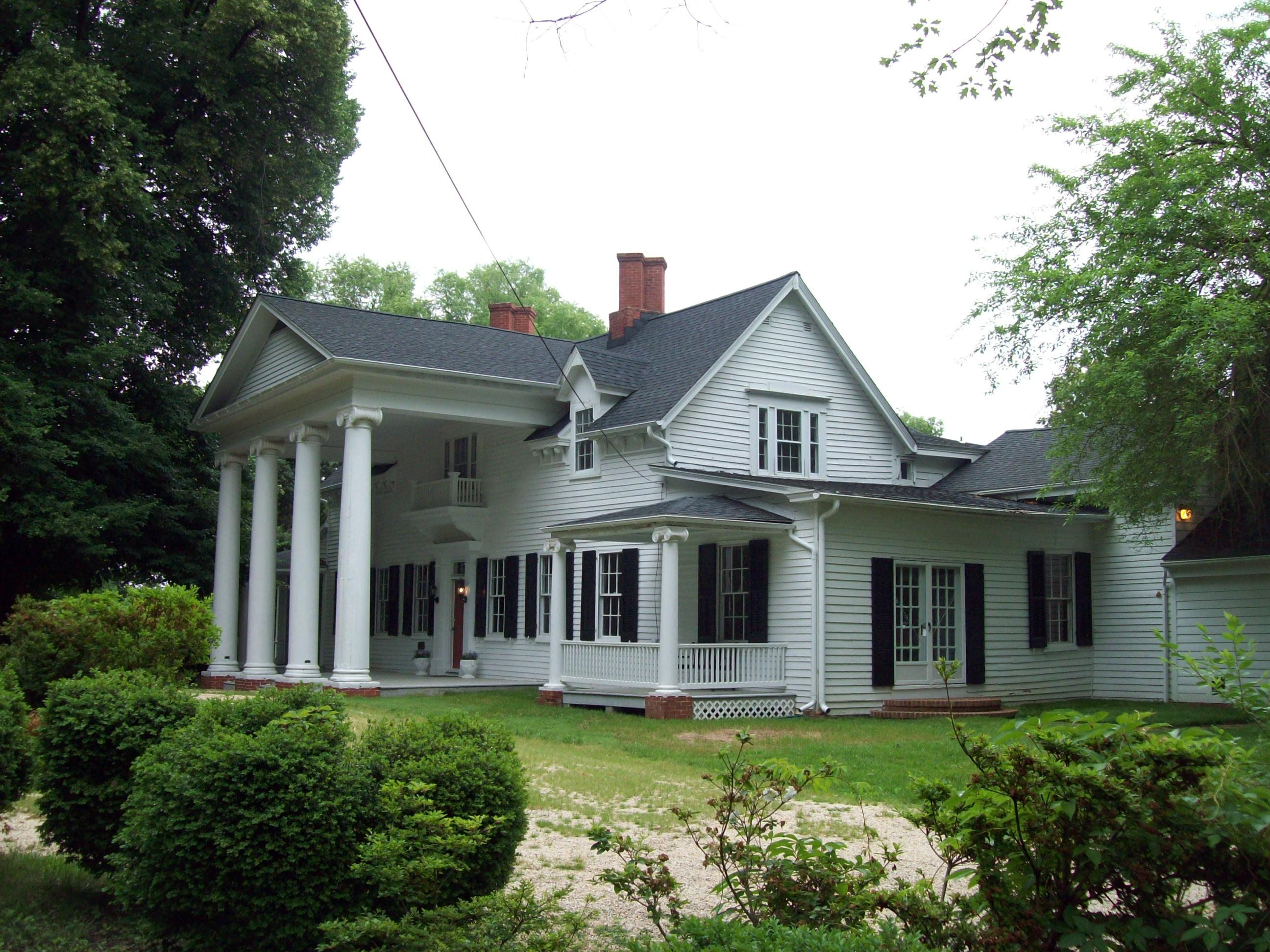
- Parkhurst, May 2010

- Location within Maryland Location within the United States
- Location: 1059 Cumberstone Rd., Harwood, Maryland
- Coordinates: 38°52′03.7″N 76°32′49.2″W
- Built: 1848
- Architectural style: Gothic Revival
- NRHP reference No.: 01000372
- Added to NRHP: April 13, 2001

Parkhurst is a historic home in Harwood, Anne Arundel County, Maryland. It is a large two-story frame house with a complex floor plan, reflecting the evolution of the dwelling. The original Gothic Revival vernacular, center-passage, double-pile plan house was constructed about 1848–1850 by Richard S. Mercer. Alterations and additions were made in the early 20th century, giving the house a Neoclassical appearance. Also on the property are a timber framed mid-19th century smokehouse and an early-20th century frame tobacco barn.

It was listed on the National Register of Historic Places in 2001. Tobacco barn was replaced in 2014.
