= Muscoe R. H. Garnett =

American politician

Muscoe R.H. Garnett
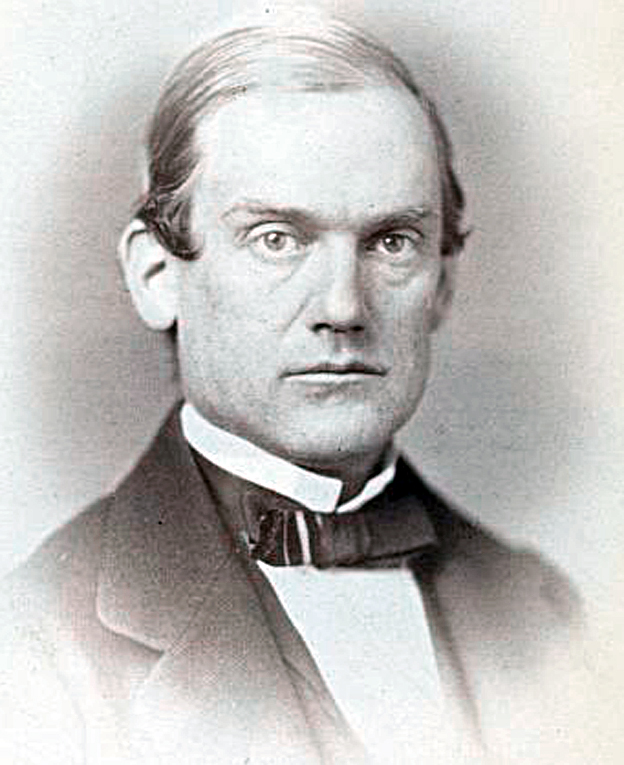

Member of the Confederate States House of Representatives from Virginia's 1st district
- In office February 18, 1862 – February 14, 1864
- Preceded by: Position established
- Succeeded by: Robert Latane Montague

Member of the U.S. House of Representatives from Virginia's 1st district
- In office December 1, 1856 – March 3, 1861
- Preceded by: Thomas H. Bayly
- Succeeded by: Joseph E. Segar

Member of the Virginia House of Delegates from Essex and King and Queen Counties
- In office 1854–1857
- Preceded by: Richard Muse
- Succeeded by: Thomas W. Garrett

Personal details
- Born: Muscoe Russell Hunter Garnett; July 25, 1821 Loretto, Virginia, U.S.
- Died: February 14, 1864 (aged 42) Loretto, Virginia, U.S.
- Cause of death: Typhoid fever
- Resting place: Elmwood
- Party: Democratic
- Spouse: Mary Picton Stevens (m. 1860)
- Relations: James M. Garnett (grandfather); Robert Mercer Taliaferro Hunter (uncle)
- Children: 2
- Education: University of Virginia
- Occupation: Attorney

Muscoe Russell Hunter Garnett (July 25, 1821 – February 14, 1864), was a nineteenth-century politician and lawyer from Virginia. He served in both the U.S. House of Representatives (1856 to 1861) and the Confederate States House of Representatives (1862 to 1864).

== Early life ==
Garnett was born on his family's "Elmwood" estate located near Loretto, Virginia. He was the son of James Mercer Garnett and Maria (née Hunter) Garnett, and born into the First Families of Virginia.

His grandfather James M. Garnett and aunts raised him after his father died in 1824. He received a private education suitable to his class. Along with his grandfather, his great-uncle Robert S. Garnett was a congressman, and his uncle was Robert Mercer Taliaferro Hunter, who served as a congressman, senator, and C.S. Secretary of State. He attended the University of Virginia, where he received his law degree in 1842. Garnett was admitted to the Virginia bar in 1842, and set up practice, as his father had done, in Loretto.

== Career ==
He was a delegate to the Virginia Constitutional Convention in 1850 and 1851 where he opposed expansion of the electorate, fearing internal improvements that would benefit western counties. In 1850, he wrote a pamphlet The Union, Past and Future; how it works and how to save it. By a Citizen of Virginia, which discussed the relationship of slavery to the national government.

=== Early political career ===
Prior to his election to Congress, he was a Virginia delegate to both the 1852 and 1856 Democratic National Conventions, a member of the Virginia House of Delegates (from 1853 to 1856), and a member of the Board of Visitors of the University of Virginia (from 1855 to 1859).

=== Congress ===
In 1856, Garnett was elected as a Democrat from Virginia's 1st Congressional District to the 34th Congress to fill the vacancy caused by the death of Thomas H. Bayly. He was subsequently reelected to both the 35th and 36th Congresses, serving from December 1, 1856, to March 3, 1861, only leaving at the outbreak of the Civil War.

With his sympathies lying with the South, he became a delegate to first the Virginia secession convention and then to the State constitutional convention in 1861.

=== Confederate Congress ===
From 1862 to 1864, he was a Virginian member of the First Confederate Congress. During that same time, his uncle Robert Hunter was the CSA Secretary of State and then a CSA Senator.

== Personal life ==
He was married on July 26, 1860, to Mary Picton Stevens (1840–1903), a daughter of Edwin Augustus Stevens. They had two children before his early death:

- James Mercer Garnett, who was born July 7, 1861.
- Mary Barton Picton Garnett, who was born May 28, 1863.

"Elmwood" was listed on the National Register of Historic Places in 1970.

== Death and burial ==
While attending the Confederate Congress in early 1864, Muscoe caught typhoid fever, and subsequently died at his family's "Elmwood" estate on February 14, 1864, where he was buried in the family cemetery. After his death, his widow married Edward Parke Custis Lewis, a diplomat, who was a great-great nephew of George Washington.

== Elections ==
- 1856; Garnett was first elected to the U.S. House of Representatives in a special election with 51.58% of the vote, defeating American Robert Saunders.
- 1857; Garnett was re-elected with 57.08% of the vote, defeating American John Critcher.
- 1859; Garnett was re-elected unopposed.

Confederate States House of Representatives
Preceded by Position established	Member of the Confederate House of Representatives from Virginia's 1st Congressional District; 1862–1864	Succeeded by Robert Latane Montague
U.S. House of Representatives
Preceded by Thomas H. Bayly	Member of the U.S. House of Representatives from Virginia's 1st congressional district 1856–1861	Succeeded by Joseph Segar
