= John Francis Mercer =

American Founding Father and politician (1759–1821)

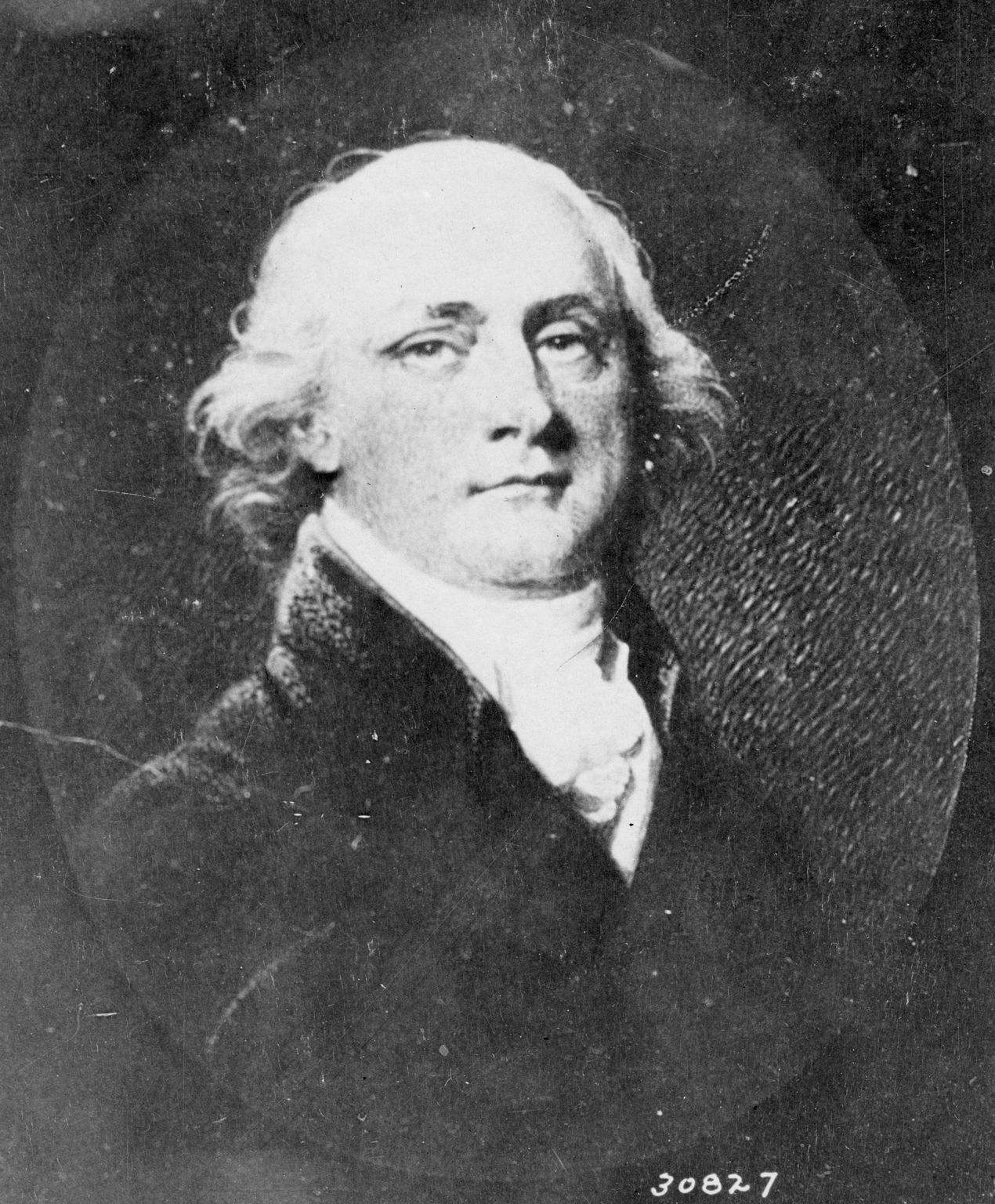
- Portrait by Robert Field, 1803

10th Governor of Maryland
- In office November 10, 1801 – November 13, 1803
- Preceded by: Benjamin Ogle
- Succeeded by: Robert Bowie

Member of the U.S. House of Representatives from Maryland
- In office February 6, 1792 – April 13, 1794
- Preceded by: William Pinkney
- Succeeded by: Gabriel Duvall
- Constituency: 3rd district (1792–1793); 2nd district (1793–1794)

Member of the Lower House of the Maryland General Assembly for Anne Arundel County
- In office 1800-1801, 1803-1805
- In office 1788-1792

Member of the Virginia House of Delegates for Stafford County
- In office October 1785 – January, 1786 Serving with William Garrard
- Preceded by: William Brent
- Succeeded by: Andrew Buchannan

Member of the Continental Congress for Virginia
- In office 1782–1785

Member of the Virginia House of Delegates for Stafford County
- In office May 1782 – December 1782 Serving with Charles Carter
- Preceded by: Thomas Mountjoy
- Succeeded by: Thomson Mason

Personal details
- Born: May 17, 1759 Stafford County, Colony of Virginia, British America
- Died: August 30, 1821 (aged 62) Philadelphia, Pennsylvania, U.S.
- Resting place: Cedar Park Estate, Galesville, Maryland
- Party: Anti-Federalist (1782), Federalist (1801)
- Spouse: Sophia Sprigg
- Relations: John Mercer, James Mercer, George Mercer
- Children: 4, including Margaret Mercer, John Mercer Jr.
- Education: College of William & Mary
- Occupation: Lawyer, politician

Military service
- Allegiance: Continental Army; United States Army
- Rank: Lieutenant colonel
- Unit: 3rd Virginia Regiment; Virginia militia
- Battles/wars: American Revolutionary War; Battle of Brandywine (WIA); Battle of Guilford

John Francis Mercer (May 17, 1759 – August 30, 1821) was a Founding Father of the United States, politician, lawyer, planter, and slave owner from Virginia and Maryland. An officer during the Revolutionary War, Mercer initially served in the Virginia House of Delegates and then the Maryland State Assembly. As a member of the assembly, he was appointed a delegate from Maryland to the Philadelphia Convention of 1787, where he was a framer of the U.S. Constitution though he left the convention before signing. Mercer was later elected to the U.S. House of Representatives from two different districts in Maryland. In 1801—1803, he served as Maryland's 10th governor.

== Early life and education ==
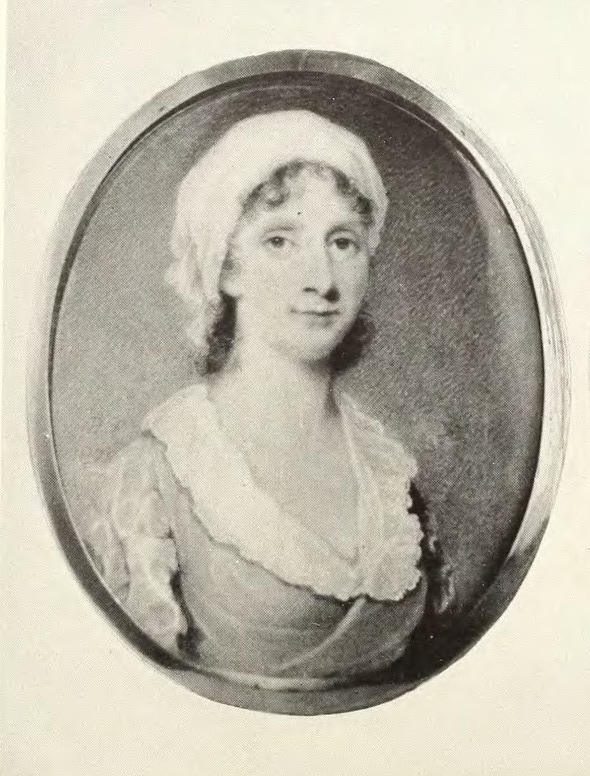
Sophia Sprigg Mercer

Mercer was born in 1759 at Marlborough plantation in Stafford County in the Colony of Virginia, to prominent lawyer, planter and investor in western lands John Mercer (1704–1768) and his second wife, Ann Roy (1729–1770), the daughter of Dr. Mungo Roy of Essex County, Virginia. His father John Mercer fathered 19 children by two wives, although many died before reaching adulthood. His father's first wife was Catherine Mason (1707–1750), daughter of burgess George Mason II (1660–1716). His namesake half-brother, Captain John Fenton Mercer (1735–1756) had been killed and scalped in western Virginia during the French and Indian War. His elder half brothers George Mercer (1733–1784) and James Mercer (1736–1793) served in the Virginia House of Burgesses, and James also became a prominent lawyer and served in Virginia revolutionary conventions, the Virginia House of Delegates and the Continental Congress (1779–1780) before becoming a judge, ultimately of what later became the Virginia Supreme Court. Mercer also had several sisters and half-sisters who survived to adulthood, including Sarah Mercer (1738–1806) who married Col. Samuel Selden (1725–1791) of Stafford County, Mary Mercer (1740–1764) who married Daniel McCarty Jr. of Westmoreland County, Anna Mercer (1760–1787) who married Benjamin Harrison VI (1755–1799), Grace Mercer (1751–1814) who married Muscoe Garnett (1736–1803) of Essex County, and Maria Mercer (born 1761) who married Richard Brooke (1760–1816) of King and Queen County. His younger brother Robert Mercer (1764–1800) would marry Mildred Carter, daughter of prominent planter Landon Carter (1710–1778), and become a lawyer and editor of the "Genius of Liberty". Like all his brothers who lived to adulthood, Mercer attended the College of William and Mary, graduated in 1775 and read law with Thomas Jefferson.

== Career ==
=== Soldier ===
During the American Revolutionary War, Mercer accepted a commission as lieutenant in the 3rd Virginia Regiment in the Continental Army. He was wounded at the Battle of Brandywine on September 11, 1777, and received a retroactive promotion to captain as of June 1777. On June 8, 1778 he became an aide-de-camp with the rank of major to General Charles Lee.

He resigned from the army when Lee retired in July 1779, but by October recruited a cavalry company for the Virginia militia as the British navy discharged the British Legion and others to raid plantations in Chesapeake Bay. Thus Mercer held the rank of lieutenant colonel and served briefly under Lafayette as he led troops at the Battle of Guilford, Battle of Green Spring, siege of Yorktown and other locations.

=== Virginia politician ===
After General Cornwallis' surrender in 1781, Stafford County voters elected Mercer as one of their two representatives in the Virginia House of Delegates in 1782, where he served alongside Charles Carter. Fellow legislators selected Mercer as one of Virginia's delegates to the Continental Congress in both 1783 and 1784. When Richard Brent died, a special election to fill his place as Stafford County's delegate to the Virginia House of Delegates was held, and John Francis Mercer took his place for the rest of the session.

=== Maryland planter ===
In 1785 Mercer married his wife, as discussed below, and soon moved to Anne Arundel County, Maryland, where he operated her estates ("West River Farm") using enslaved labor. Sophia Mercer had received land and slaves under the terms of her grandparents' wills (5 slaves from her grandfather in 1782 and 19 slaves from her grandmother in 1789), Mercer brought 24 slaves from Virginia in 1798-1799, and another 11 slaves between 1799 and 1801 (including at least 3 inherited from his mother). In 1810 Mercer sold his slaves and plantation equipment in Anne Arundel County to his namesake son John, which together with digitizing issues makes the precise number of slaves he owned in 1810 and 1820 unclear. and 1820. Mercer owned 72 slaves by the time he died in 1821, which with his other personal property was valued at $19,976.75.

=== Maryland politician ===
Meanwhile, Mercer became one of Maryland's delegates to the Philadelphia Convention in 1787, but because he was opposed to centralization, withdrew before signing the Constitution. He also represented fellow anti-ratification delegate George Mason as a private lawyer collecting debts owed to Mason by Maryland residents. Mercer was also a delegate to the Maryland State Convention of 1788, to vote whether Maryland should ratify the proposed Constitution of the United States. He served terms in the lower house of the Maryland State Assembly in 1788-89 and 1791-92.

He was an unsuccessful candidate to represent Maryland's 3rd congressional district in 1789, but would later be elected to that district in 1792. He then represented the 2nd district from 1793 until his resignation on April 13, 1794. Despite owning slaves, Mercer was one of seven representatives to vote against the Fugitive Slave Act of 1793.

He again served in the Maryland House of Delegates (1800-1801) before winning election as the tenth governor of Maryland (for two one-year terms) from 1801 to 1803. Although Mercer again served in the Maryland House of Delegates in 1803-1806 (and joined with the Federalists during Thomas Jefferson's Presidency), illness plagued Mercer in his later years.

=== Personal life ===
On February 3, 1785, he married heiress Sophia Sprigg (1766–1812), daughter of Richard Sprigg (1739–1798) and Margaret Marcer, nee Caile (1745–1796) of Anne Arundel County, Maryland. They had at least four children, including Margaret Mercer, who became an abolitionist and freed all the slaves she inherited upon her father's death. Their son John Mercer (1788-1848), bought slaves and plantation equipment from this man (his father) in 1810 and received part of his maternal inheritance from his father in 1818 (when this man released his life interest in 606 acres of the 1478 acres his wife had re-patented in 1804) to him. That John Mercer married Mary Swann of Alexandria, Virginia and died in Virginia, and their other son Richard Mercer (by 1789-1821) did not have issue. His nephew, congressman Charles Fenton Mercer, opposed slavery and was president of the American Colonization Society.

== Death and legacy ==
Mercer traveled to Philadelphia, Pennsylvania to seek medical attention, and died there on August 30, 1821. A funeral was held at St. Peter's Church in Philadelphia. Sources differ as to whether his remains were buried in that churchyard, or returned to his "Cedar Park" estate in Maryland for burial.

== Notes ==
U.S. House of Representatives
Preceded by William Pinkney	U.S. Congressman from Maryland's 3rd District; 1792–1793	Succeeded by Uriah Forrest
Preceded by William Hindman	U.S. Congressman from Maryland's 2nd District; 1793–1794	Succeeded by Gabriel Duvall
Political offices
Preceded by Benjamin Ogle	Governor of Maryland; 1801–1803	Succeeded by Robert Bowie
