= Elmwood (Loretto, Virginia) =

Historic house in Virginia, United States

- U.S. National Register of Historic Places
- Virginia Landmarks Register
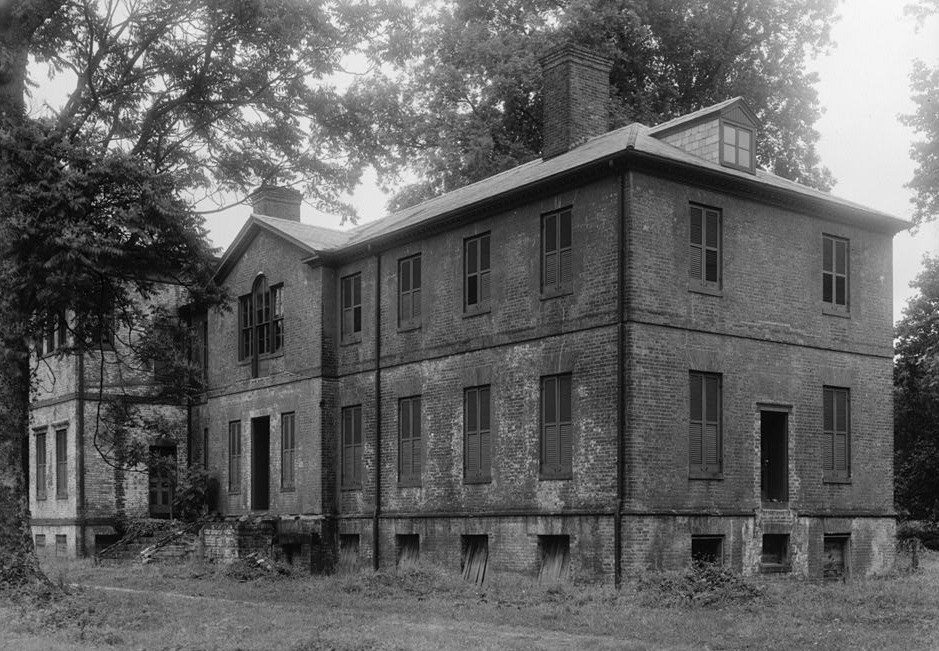
- Elmwood, HABS Photo

- Location within Virginia Location within the United States
- Location: SW of jct. of Rtes. 640 and U.S. 17, near Loretto, Virginia
- Coordinates: 38°05′16″N 77°0′31″W
- Area: 850 acres (340 ha)
- Built: 1774
- Architect: Ariss, John
- Architectural style: Colonial, Georgian, Mid-Georgian
- NRHP reference No.: 70000790
- VLR No.: 028-0011

Significant dates
- Added to NRHP: September 15, 1970
- Designated VLR: June 2, 1970

Elmwood is a historic plantation house located near Loretto, Essex County, Virginia. It was built in 1774, and is a two-story, five-bay, brick dwelling with a hipped roof and shallow central projecting pavilion in the Georgian style. It features a Palladian window and a one-story porch extending the length of the facade. The house was remodeled in 1852, much of which was later removed. It was the birthplace and home of Muscoe Russell Hunter Garnett, and was the home and burial place of his grandfather James M. Garnett.

It was listed on the National Register of Historic Places in 1970.
