= Charles F. Mercer =

American politician (1778–1858)

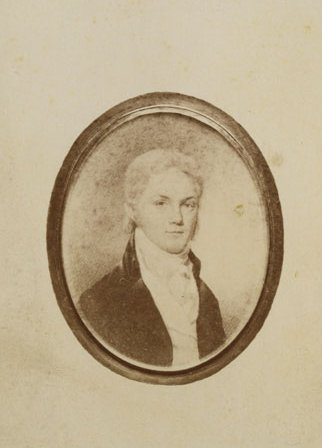

Member of the U.S. House of Representatives from Virginia
- In office March 4, 1817 – December 26, 1839
- Preceded by: Joseph Lewis, Jr. (8th); Jabez Leftwich (14th)
- Succeeded by: Burwell Bassett (8th); William M. McCarty (14th)
- Constituency: 8th district (1817-23); 14th district (1823-39)

Member of the Virginia House of Delegates from Loudoun County
- In office December 3, 1810 – March 3, 1817 Serving with William Noland, Thomas Gregg
- Preceded by: Stephen C. Roszel
- Succeeded by: Joseph Lewis, Jr.

Personal details
- Born: Charles Fenton Mercer; June 16, 1778 Fredericksburg, Virginia
- Died: May 4, 1858 (aged 79) Howard estate, Alexandria, Virginia, U.S.
- Resting place: Union Cemetery; Leesburg, Virginia, U.S.
- Education: Princeton College

Military service
- Allegiance: United States
- Rank: Lieutenant colonel
- Battles/wars: War of 1812

Charles Fenton Mercer (June 16, 1778 – May 4, 1858) was a nineteenth-century politician and lawyer from Loudoun County, Virginia who served in the U.S. House of Representatives and the Virginia General Assembly.

== Early and family life ==
The younger son of Virginia planter, lawyer and politician James Mercer and his wife the former Eleanor Dick was born in Fredericksburg about a decade after the death of his grandfather, noted colonial lawyer, author and land speculator John Mercer. His mother died when he was two (the year his father became a judge), and he was orphaned when he was fifteen. The need to educate his sons may have led James Mercer to become a trustee of the Fredericksburg Academy, for James Mercer would write his friend George Mason about the new school's advantages over the College of William and Mary in Williamsburg (where James Mercer and his brothers had studied), Hampden-Sydney college and schools in Richmond, the new state capital. His elder brother John Fenton Mercer (named after an uncle who died and was scalped in the French and Indian War) would also follow their grandfather's and father's career path—admitted to the Virginia bar in Fredericksburg, and operate the family plantation in Spotsylvania County using enslaved labor as well as serve in the Virginia House of Delegates—like their father and uncle John F. Mercer (who also served in the U.S. Congress and as Maryland governor). His first cousins Robert Selden Garnett and James Mercer Garnett, both also served as members of Congress.

Mercer did not travel to Williamsburg for higher studies, but rather to Princeton, New Jersey, after the American Revolutionary War. He graduated from Princeton College in 1797. The following year Mercer accepted a commission as captain of cavalry from President George Washington, who expected a war with France, which did not happen. Mercer returned to Princeton, took a postgraduate course, received a further degree in 1800, then toured Europe in 1802-1803. Upon returning to Virginia, he read law.

== Career ==
Admitted to the bar in 1802, Mercer began his private legal practice in Loudoun County. In 1810 he helped to found the village of Aldie, Virginia, near his mill.

Loudoun County voters elected Mercer as one of their representatives in the Virginia House of Delegates in 1810 and he won re-election multiple times until 1817. In his final term, he introduced a bill to establish a system of free public education for white boys and girls, administered by a board of education and financed by the state literary fund. [Jethro Neville of Hardy County, first elected the following year would introduce a similar bill, which also failed to pass.] Mercer served alongside veteran William Noland for several years, then with Thomas Gregg in 1815 and 1816, after which Mercer left for Congress. In his last term in the House of Delegates, Mercer chaired the finance committee and introduced a bill to construct a canal along the Potomac River.

Meanwhile, during the War of 1812, Mercer accepted a commission as lieutenant colonel of a Virginia regiment. Promoted to major, he took command of the important defenses at Norfolk, Virginia. Mercer also served as inspector general in 1814, aide-de-camp to Governor James Barbour and brigadier general in command of the 2nd Virginia Brigade.

Mercer authored a report in the state legislature in 1816 calling for state supported primary schooling for all white children. Supervision was to be provided by a state Board of Public Instruction, chosen by the legislature. In 1817, his bill passed the lower house but died in the state senate. Thomas Jefferson opposed the plan because heavy funding for primary schools would divert money from his beloved state university, and the plan would replace local control by state control.

In 1816 Mercer won election to the United States House of Representatives, then won re-election several times, serving from 1817 to 1839, one of the longest continuous memberships in that era. That seniority helped him become Chairman of the Committee on Roads and Canals from 1831 to 1839. In 1817, Mercer was elected a member of the American Philosophical Society in Philadelphia. At various times Mercer ran as a Federalist, Crawford Republican, Adams Republican, Anti-Jacksonian and Whig.

Mercer believed in internal improvements and protection of domestic manufactures. Before his service on the House Committee on Roads and Canals, he had been the first president of the Chesapeake & Ohio Canal Co., serving from 1828 to 1833.

He also opposed slavery and became active in the American Colonization Society, which he helped found in 1816, Bushrod Washington becoming its president and serving until his death. By the following year it had a national presence, and worked to establish the Free State of Liberia. James Madison, Henry Clay, John Marshall, John Randolph, John Taylor of Caroline, William H. Crawford, Daniel Webster, Francis Scott Key, and James Monroe also became founding or early members. Members often debated two troublesome questions: how many free blacks would voluntarily agree to be deported, and who would pay for it? Federal census records are unclear whether Mercer owned slaves in 1820, but he owned no slaves in 1830. Mercer became vice president of the Virginia Colonization Society in 1836, and vice president of the National Society of Agriculture in 1842. In 1853 he again visited Europe, to confer about the abolition of slavery.

Voters in a district encompassing Loudoun and neighboring Fairfax Counties elected Mercer, former President James Monroe, William H. Fitzhugh and Richard H. Henderson to represent them in the Virginia Constitutional Convention of 1829-1830 (with Joshua Osborn replacing Monroe after he resigned). Fellow delegates selected Mercer to serve on the Committee of the Legislative Department. Increased representation for western Virginia and the gradual abolition of slavery were two key issues at that Virginia Constitutional Convention.

== Death and legacy ==
Mercer died at the estate known as "Howard" which later became Episcopal High School, near Alexandria, Virginia, on May 4, 1858. He was buried at Union Cemetery in Leesburg.

His papers from 1852 to 1858 are held by the Library of Virginia.

U.S. House of Representatives
Preceded by Joseph Lewis, Jr.	Member of the U.S. House of Representatives from Virginia's 8th congressional district March 4, 1817 – March 4, 1823	Succeeded by Burwell Bassett
Preceded by Jabez Leftwich	Member of the U.S. House of Representatives from Virginia's 14th congressional district March 4, 1823 – December 26, 1839	Succeeded by William M. McCarty
