= Robert S. Garnett (politician) =

American politician

Robert Selden Garnett (April 26, 1789 – August 15, 1840) was a nineteenth-century politician and lawyer from Virginia. He was the brother of James M. Garnett and the first cousin of Charles F. Mercer. He served five terms as a member of the United States House of Representatives from 1817 to 1827.

== Biography ==
Born at "Mount Pleasant" near Loretto, Virginia, Garnett attended the College of New Jersey, to planter Muscoe Garnett (1736–1803) and his wife Grace Garnett, née Mercer (1751–1814), daughter of colonial lawyer John Mercer (1704–1768). He studied law and was admitted to the bar, commencing practice in Lloyds, Virginia.

=== Political career ===
Garnett became a member of the Virginia House of Delegates in 1816 and 1817 and was elected to the United States House of Representatives in 1816, serving from 1817 to 1827 as both a Democratic-Republican and a Jacksonian.

=== Later career and death ===
He was not a candidate for reelection in 1826 and instead continued to practice law in Lloyds until his death on August 15, 1840, at his estate called "Champlain" in Lloyds. He was interred in the family cemetery on the estate.

== Family ==
He married and had children by Charlotte de Gouges (1796–1856), granddaughter of France's early great feminist Olympe de Gouges, who was executed during the Reign of Terror in the Place de la Concorde.

One of his children was Robert Selden Garnett (1819–1861), who was a military officer, serving in the United States Army until the American Civil War.

U.S. House of Representatives
Preceded by William H. Roane	Member of the U.S. House of Representatives from Virginia's 12th congressional district March 4, 1817 – March 3, 1827 (obsolete district)	Succeeded by John Roane
